= List of tallest buildings in San Antonio =

Skyline of San Antonio
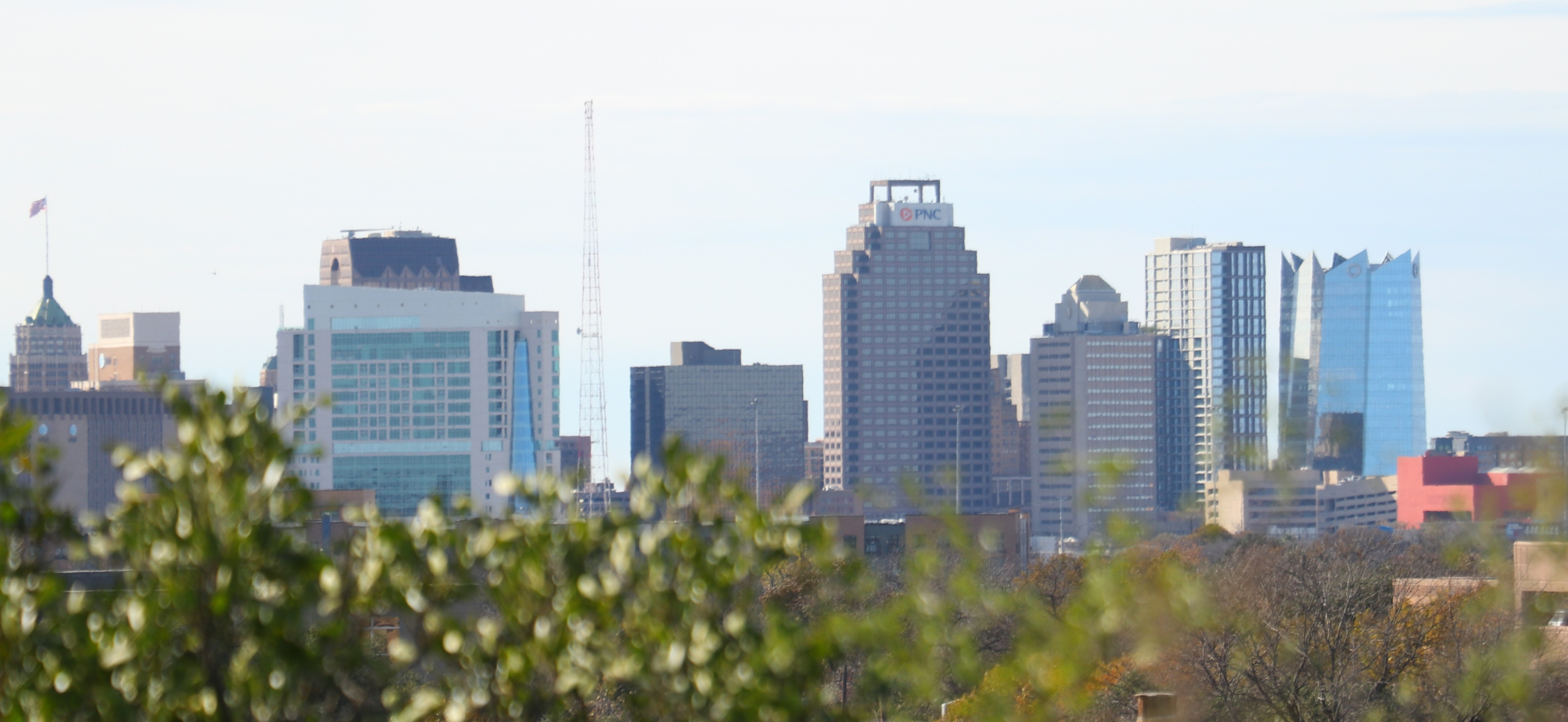
- Downtown San Antonio from U.S. Route 281 in 2026
- Tallest building: San Antonio Marriott Rivercenter (1988)
- Tallest building height: 546 ft (166.4 m)
- Tallest structure: Tower of the Americas (1968)
- Tallest structure height: 750 ft (228.6 m)

Number of tall buildings
- Taller than 100 m (328 ft): 9
- Taller than 150 m (492 ft): 1

Number of tall buildings — feet
- Taller than 200 ft (61.0 m): 37
- Taller than 300 ft (91.4 m): 12

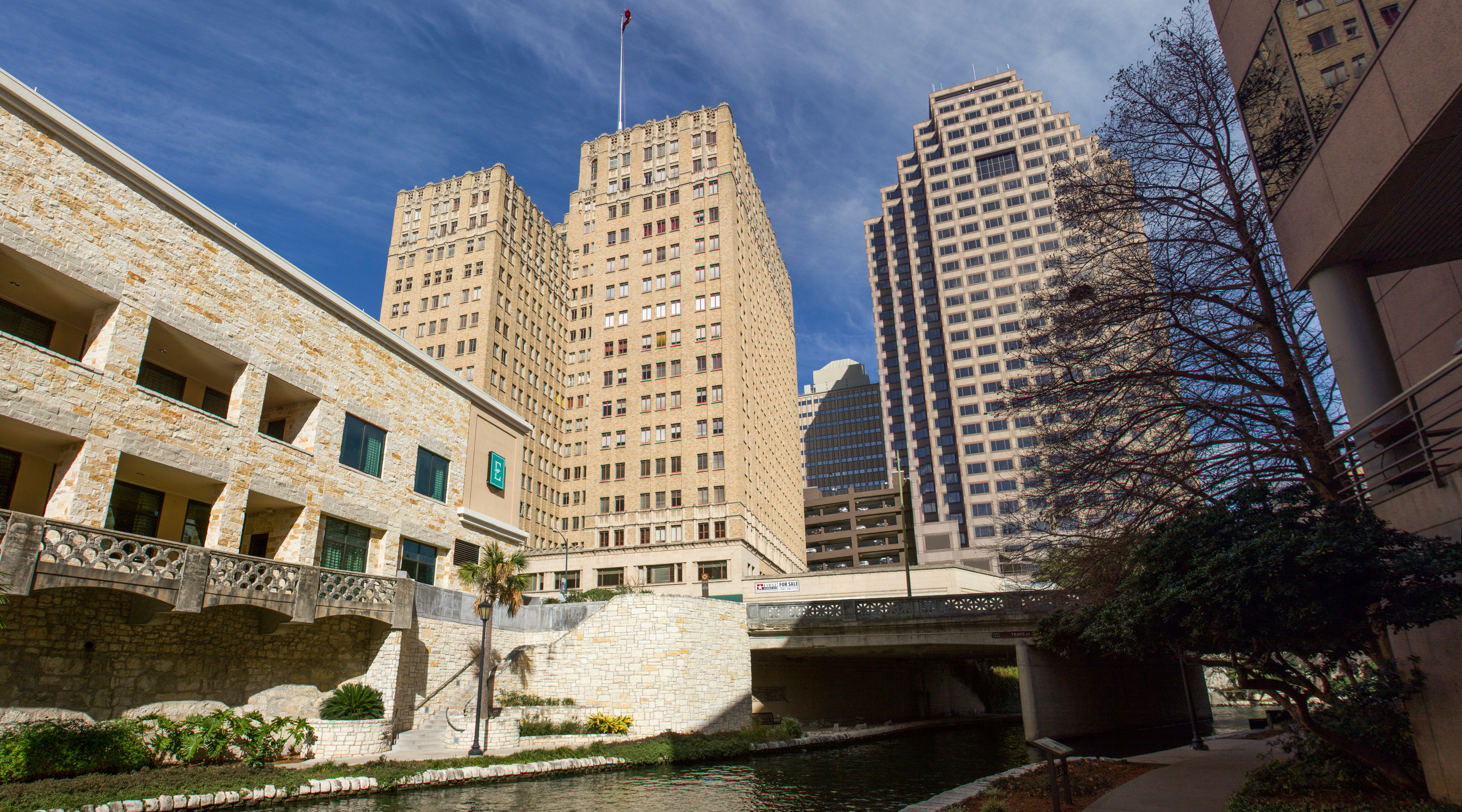
The Milam Building (left) and the Weston Centre (right) on the San Antonio River Walk

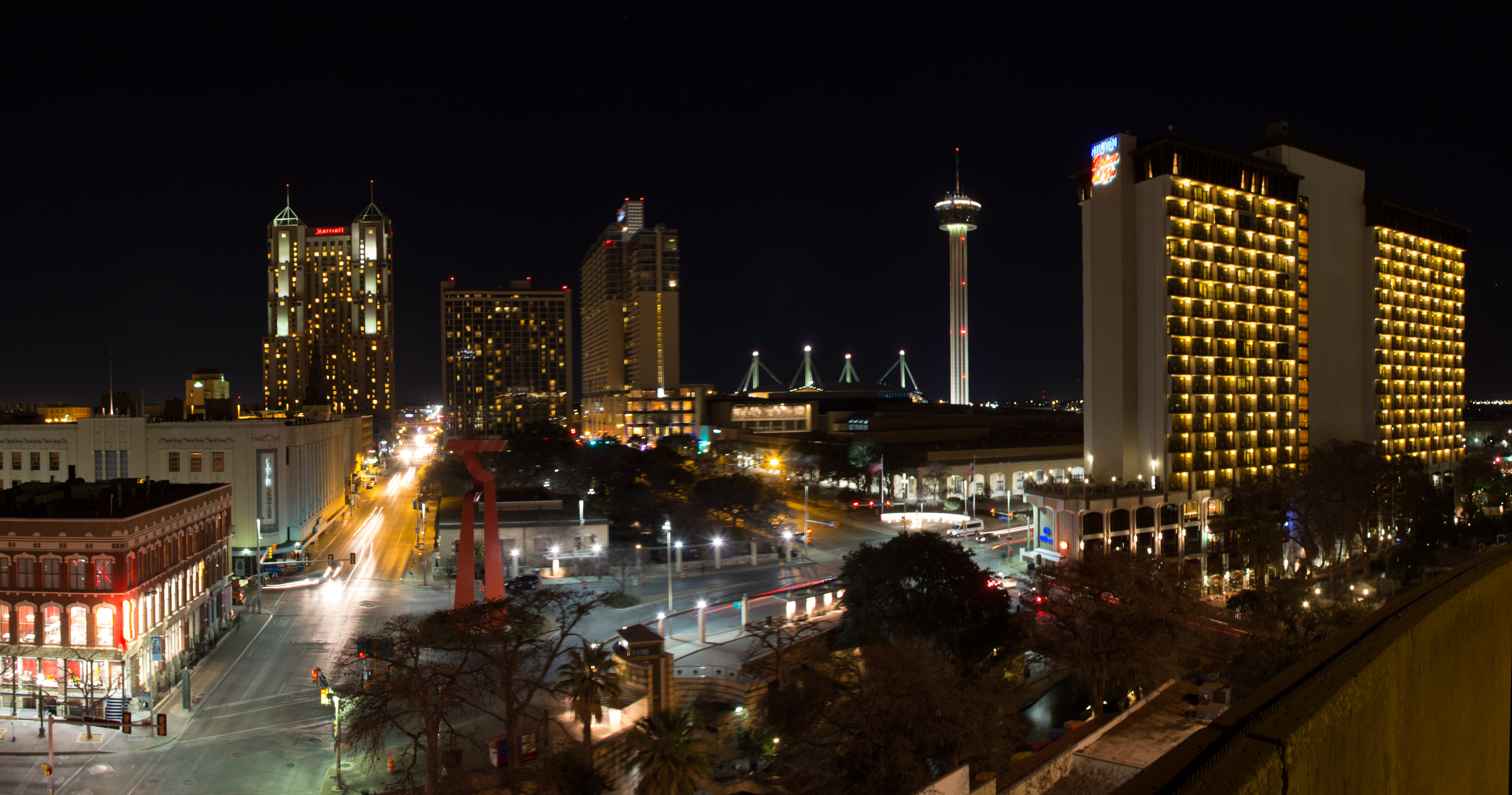
San Antonio's skyline at night in 2014.

San Antonio, a major city in the U.S. state of Texas, is home to 36 buildings that stand at least 200 feet (61 m) tall as of 2026, 12 of which exceed 300 feet (91 m) in height. The tallest building in San Antonio is the Marriott Rivercenter, a 546 ft (166.4 m) tall hotel skyscraper that was built in 1988. However, the city's tallest free-standing structure is the 750 ft (229 m) Tower of the Americas. It is the second-tallest observation tower in the United States. San Antonio's skyline is the largest in Texas outside of the metropolitan areas of Houston, Dallas, and Austin. Despite being more populous than nearby Austin, San Antonio has far fewer tall buildings.

San Antonio's first high-rise construction boom occurred in the 1920s. This period saw the completion of the Emily Morgan Hotel, the Milam Building, and the Tower Life Building, each of which became the tallest building in the city. The 280 ft (85 m) Milam Building was the first high-rise air-conditioned office building in the United States, while the 404 ft (123 m) Tower Life Building (originally the Smith-Young Tower) is notable for its late gothic revival architecture and its brick and terracotta octagonal exterior. After the onset of the Great Depression, skyscraper construction slowed. The Tower Life Building remained the city's tallest building for nearly 60 years.

High-rise development resumed in the late 1950s, and continued steadily for the next two decades. The famous Tower of the Americas was built for the city's world's fair, HemisFair '68. The structure was the tallest observation tower in the country until 1996, when the Stratosphere Tower in Las Vegas was completed. The 1980s was the most productive decade for San Antonio's skyline, and saw the construction of the Marriott Rivercenter and the city's second tallest building, the Weston Centre. Since 2000, there have been two main periods of high-rise development. The first occurred in the late 2000s, and saw the addition of Grand Hyatt San Antonio, the city's third tallest building. The second has been ongoing since the late 2010s. The Frost Tower, the new headquarters for Frost Bank, was completed in 2019 and features a distinctive glass crown. 300 Main, the city's tallest residential building at a height of 387 ft (118 m), was completed in 2024 amidst an apartment boom.

Most of San Antonio's tallest buildings are located in downtown, surrounded by Interstate 35 to the west and Interstate 37 to the east. The San Antonio River runs through downtown, and a section of the river forms the San Antonio River Walk in the center of downtown. Several prominent high-rises are situated along the river walk, including the city's four tallest buildings, the Drury Plaza Hotel, and the Hilton Palacio del Rio. A triangle-shaped "viewshed" around the Alamo has limited the height of buildings around the fortress since 2003. There are ten buildings taller than 200 ft (61 m) elsewhere in the city, the tallest of which is The Towers at Park Lane. The furthest of these towers is Tesoro Headquarters, which sits outside Loop 1604.

== History ==
Number of buildings by height in San Antonio by the end of each year, based on the information in this article. This takes into account one demolished building. Click on the legend to toggle a specific height on or off. View chart definition.

== Cityscape ==
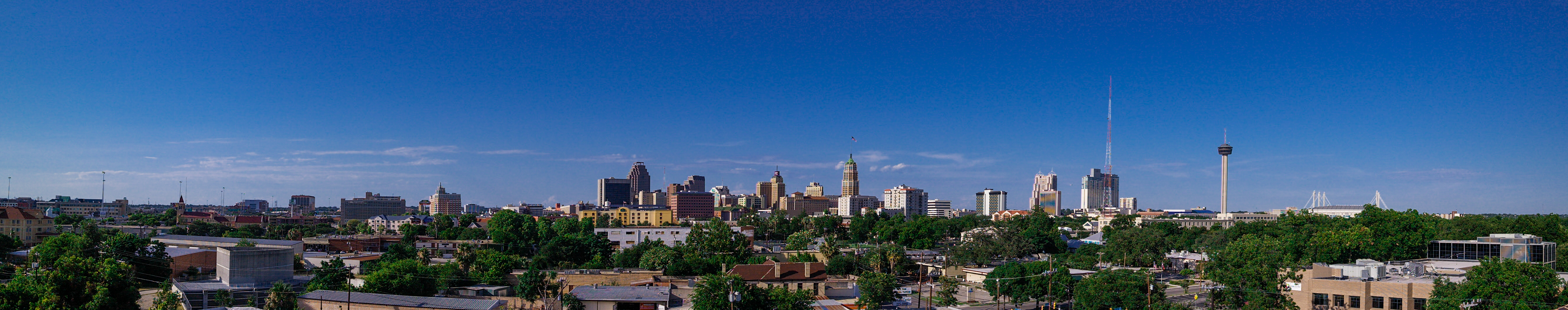
Panorama of the San Antonio skyline in 2013

== Map of tallest buildings ==
The map below shows the location of buildings taller than 200 ft (61 m) in Downtown San Antonio, where most of the city's tallest buildings stand. Each marker is numbered by the building's height rank, and colored by the decade of its completion.

Buildings taller than 200 ft (61 m) in San Antonio. An asterisk (*) next to the building's name indicates it is located outside the map.
- 1950s and before
- 1960s
- 1970s
- 1980s
- 1990s
- 2000s
- 2010s
- 2020s
1 San Antonio Marriott Rivercenter
2 Weston Centre
3 Grand Hyatt San Antonio
4 Tower Life Building
5 Frost Tower
6 Bank of America Plaza
7 300 Main
8 The Towers at Park Lane*
9 San Antonio Marriott Riverwalk
10 InterContinental San Antonio
11 The Arts Residences at the Thompson Hotel
12 City Tower
13 Vidorra I
14 Milam Building
15 Broadway Tower*
16 Drury Plaza Hotel
17 Nix Professional Building
18 One Riverwalk Place
19 AT&T Building
20 AC + Element Hotel
21 UHS Women's and Children's Tower*
22 Canopy by Hilton San Antonio
23 Holiday Inn Riverwalk
24 The Enclave at 1550*
25 Tesoro Headquarters*
26 Inspire Downtown
27 Wurzbach Towers*
28 The Monarch San Antonio
29 Hilton Palacio del Rio
30 The Floodgate
31 Southwestern Bell Tower II
32 One International Centre*
33 Emily Morgan Hotel
34 Southwestern Bell Telephone Building
35 Air Force Village I*
36 Tetco Tower*
37 The Westin San Antonio North*

== Tallest buildings ==
This list ranks completed buildings in San Antonio that stand at least 200 ft (61 m) tall as of 2026, based on standard height measurement. This includes spires and architectural details but does not include antenna masts. The “Year” column indicates the year of completion. Buildings tied in height are sorted by year of completion with earlier buildings ranked first, and then alphabetically.

Was the tallest building in San Antonio upon completion

Rank	Name	Image	Location	Height ft (m)	Floors	Year	Purpose	Notes
N/A	Tower of the Americas		29°25′09″N 98°29′01″W	750 (228.6)	3	1968	Observation	Tallest structure in Texas (excluding radio antennas) south of Houston, the second-tallest observation tower in the United States, and third-tallest in the Western Hemisphere.
1	San Antonio Marriott Rivercenter on the River Walk		29°25′24″N 98°29′02″W	546 (166.4)	38	1988	Hotel	Tallest building in San Antonio since 1988. Tallest building in Texas outside of Houston, Dallas, and Austin. Tallest building completed in San Antonio in the 1980s.
2	Weston Centre		29°25′43″N 98°29′32″W	444 (135.2)	32	1989	Office	Tallest office building in San Antonio.
3	Grand Hyatt San Antonio River Walk	Photograph of the Grand Hyatt San Antonio in San Antonio, Texas.	29°25′19″N 98°29′02″W	424 (129.3)	34	2008	Mixed-use	Mixed-use hotel and office building. Contains 1,000 hotel rooms. Tallest building completed in San Antonio in the 2000s.
4	Tower Life Residences		29°25′22″N 98°29′29″W	404 (123.1)	30	1929	Residential	First known as the Smith-Young Tower. Also on the National Register of Historic Places. Originally an office building, it was renovated into apartments in 2026. Tallest residential building in San Antonio since 2026. Tallest building in San Antonio from 1928 to 1988. Tallest building completed in San Antonio in the 1920s. Topped by a flagpole displaying the American flag.
5	Frost Tower	Photograph of the Frost Tower in San Antonio, Texas.	29°25′37″N 98°29′42″W	400 (121.9)	23	2019	Office	The first 16 floors are occupied by Frost Bank. Tallest building completed in San Antonio in the 2010s.
6	Bank of America Plaza		29°25′46″N 98°29′24″W	387 (118)	28	1983	Office	
7	300 Main	Photograph of the nearly complete 300 Main in San Antonio, Texas.	29°25′41″N 98°29′37″W	387 (118)	32	2024	Residential	Tallest residential building in San Antonio from 2024 to 2026. Tallest building in San Antonio originally built as a residential building. Tallest building completed in San Antonio in the 2020s.
8	The Towers on Park Lane	–	29°27′50″N 98°26′46″W	368 (112.2)	23	1988	Residential	Tallest building in San Antonio outside of downtown.
9	San Antonio Marriott Riverwalk		29°25′22″N 98°29′05″W	350 (106.7)	30	1979	Hotel	Tallest building completed in San Antonio in the 1970s.
10	InterContinental San Antonio Riverwalk		29°25′44″N 98°29′35″W	325 (99.1)	21	1957	Hotel	Formerly the Wyndham San Antonio Riverwalk, it reopened as the InterContinental on August 6, 2024, after three years of renovations. Tallest building 3completed in San Antonio in the 1950s.
11	The Arts Residences at the Thompson Hotel		29°25′54″N 98°29′21″W	314 (95.7)	20	2021	Mixed-use	Mixed-use hotel and residential building.
12	City Tower		29°25′34″N 98°29′39″W	300 (91.4)	21	1973	Office	Also known as Frost Bank Tower. Former headquarters of Frost Bank until 2019, when they moved to the newly built Frost Tower (see above).
13	Vidorra San Antonio		29°25′22″N 98°28′44″W	292 (89)	25	2008	Residential	A condominium tower in the East Side neighborhood of San Antonio.
14	The Milam Building		29°25′40″N 98°29′35″W	280 (85.3)	21	1928	Office	Tallest building in San Antonio briefly from 1928 to 1929. The first air conditioned high-rise office building in the United States.
15	The Broadway		29°27′56″N 98°27′47″W	279 (85)	20	2010	Residential	
16	Drury Plaza Hotel San Antonio Riverwalk		29°25′28″N 98°29′30″W	278 (84.7)	24	1929	Hotel	Originally an office building, it was converted into a hotel in 2007. Formerly known as the Alamo National Bank Building before the conversion.
17	The NIX Riverwalk		29°25′32″N 98°29′22″W	275 (83.8)	24	1931	Hotel	Also known as the Nix Medical Center. Upon completion, it was the tallest hospital in the United States. Plans are in place to renovate it into residential units. Tallest building completed in San Antonio in the 1930s.
18	One Riverwalk Place		29°25′48″N 98°29′26″W	270 (82) (Note: Sources do not state the exact height of this building. This figure was determined using Google Earth by subtracting the altitude of the building's lowest main pedestrian open-air entrance from its highest architectural point.)	18	1981	Office	A 262,935 square-foot office building. Purchased by the University of Texas at San Antonio in 2024.
19	AT&T Building		29°25′47″N 98°29′21″W	260 (79.3)	16	1930	Office	Also known as the Southwestern Bell Telephone Building.
20	AC + Element Hotel	–	29°25′31″N 98°29′36″W	260 (79.2)	20	1982	Hotel	Formerly known as Riverview Towers West Tower. Renovated in 2022 into a dual-branded hotel.
21	Women's and Children's Hospital	–	29°30′33″N 98°34′42″W	245 (74.7)	12	2023	Health	Part of the University Health System and the South Texas Medical Center. Tallest hospital building in San Antonio.
22	Canopy by Hilton San Antonio Riverwalk		29°25′29″N 98°29′30″W	240 (73.2)	20	2021	Hotel	
23	Holiday Inn San Antonio-Riverwalk	–	29°25′33″N 98°29′30″W	228 (69.5)	24	1987	Hotel	
24	The Enclave at 1550	–	29°30′31″N 98°31′08″W	228 (69.5)	22	1996	Residential	Tallest building completed in San Antonio in the 1990s.
25	Marathon Petroleum Regional Office	–	29°37′00″N 98°27′36″W	228 (69)	14	2009	Office	Headquarters of Tesoro Corporation.
26	Inspire Downtown	–	29°25′33″N 98°29′52″W	226 (68.9)	17	2009	Residential	Formerly known as The Vistana. Renamed Inspire Downtown in 2021.
27	Wurzbach Tower	–	29°30′30″N 98°34′54″W	225 (69)	23	1983	Residential	
28	The Monarch San Antonio		29°25′20″N 98°29′14″W	220 (67)	17	2026	Hotel	
29	Hilton Palacio del Rio		29°25′21″N 98°29′16″W	217 (66.1)	20	1968	Hotel	Constructed using modular building construction techniques, which were new at the time. Tallest building completed in San Antonio in the 1960s.
30	The Floodgate	Photograph of the The Floodgate in San Antonio, Texas.	29°25′30″N 98°29′31″W	215 (65.5)	17	2024	Residential	Topped out in May 2022.
31	CPS Energy Headquarters	–	29°25′57″N 98°29′08″W	214 (65)	14	1979	Office	Renovated in 2020 by CPS Energy for $212 million.
32	One International Centre	–	29°31′11″N 98°28′59″W	213 (64.9)	15	1985	Office	Located at 100 NE Loop 410 in North Central San Antonio.
33	The Emily Morgan San Antonio		29°25′36″N 98°29′09″W	210 (64)	13	1926	Hotel	Tallest building in San Antonio briefly from 1926 to 1928.
34	AT&T Corporate Offices		29°25′59″N 98°29′15″W	209 (63.7)	16	1961	Office	
35	Blue Skies East	–	29°22′59″N 98°38′52″W	205 (62.5)	16	1970	Residential	
36	TETCO Center	–	29°31′02″N 98°26′12″W	205 (62.5)	14	1985	Office	
37	The Westin San Antonio North	–	29°32′07″N 98°33′51″W	204 (62)	20	1984	Hotel	Formerly known as the Omni San Antonio Hotel.

== Tallest under construction or proposed ==
=== Under construction ===
As of 2026, there are no buildings under construction in San Antonio that will be taller than 200 ft (61 m).

=== Proposed ===
The following table includes approved and proposed buildings in San Antonio that are expected to be at least 200 ft (61 m) tall as of 2026, based on standard height measurement. The “Year” column indicates the expected year of completion. A dash “–“ indicates information about the building’s height, floor count, or year of completion is unknown or has not been released.

Name	Height ft (m)	Floors	Year proposed	Purpose	Status	Notes
Dream Hotel San Antonio	–	14	2021	Hotel	Approved	
Hotel Sul Fiume	204 (62)	17	2023	Hotel	Approved	
JW Marriott San Antonio Downtown	–	13-14	2025	Hotel	Proposed	
550 Market Street	–	–	2026	Residential	Proposed	
309 Travis	–	27	2026	Residential	Proposed	
The Yard Residences	–	14	2026	Residential	Proposed	

== Tallest demolished ==
There has been one building taller than 200 ft (61 m) in San Antonio that no longer stands today.

Name	Image	Height ft (m)	Floors	Year completed	Year demolished	Notes
Wilford Hall Medical Center		205 (62.5)	14	1985	2024	The new Wilford Hall Ambulatory Surgical Center opened in 2017 next to the original medical center. Services were then systematically moved from the old building into the new one. Demolished between 2023 and 2024.

== Timeline of tallest buildings ==
Name	Image	Years as tallest	Height ft (m)	Floors	Reference
The St. Anthony		1909–1919	135 (41.1)	10	
South Texas Building		1919–1926	150 (45.7)	12	
The Emily Morgan San Antonio		1926–1928	210 (64)	13	
The Milam Building		1928–1929	280 (85.3)	21	
Tower Life Residences		1929–1988	404 (123.1)	30	
San Antonio Marriott Rivercenter on the River Walk		1988–present	546 (166.4)	38	

== See also ==
- List of tallest buildings in Texas
- List of tallest buildings in Austin
- List of tallest buildings in Corpus Christi
- List of tallest buildings in Dallas
- List of tallest buildings in El Paso
- List of tallest buildings in Fort Worth
- List of tallest buildings in Houston
