= San Antonio Marriott Rivercenter on the River Walk =

Hotel in San Antonio, Texas

Coordinates: 29°25′24″N 98°29′02″W

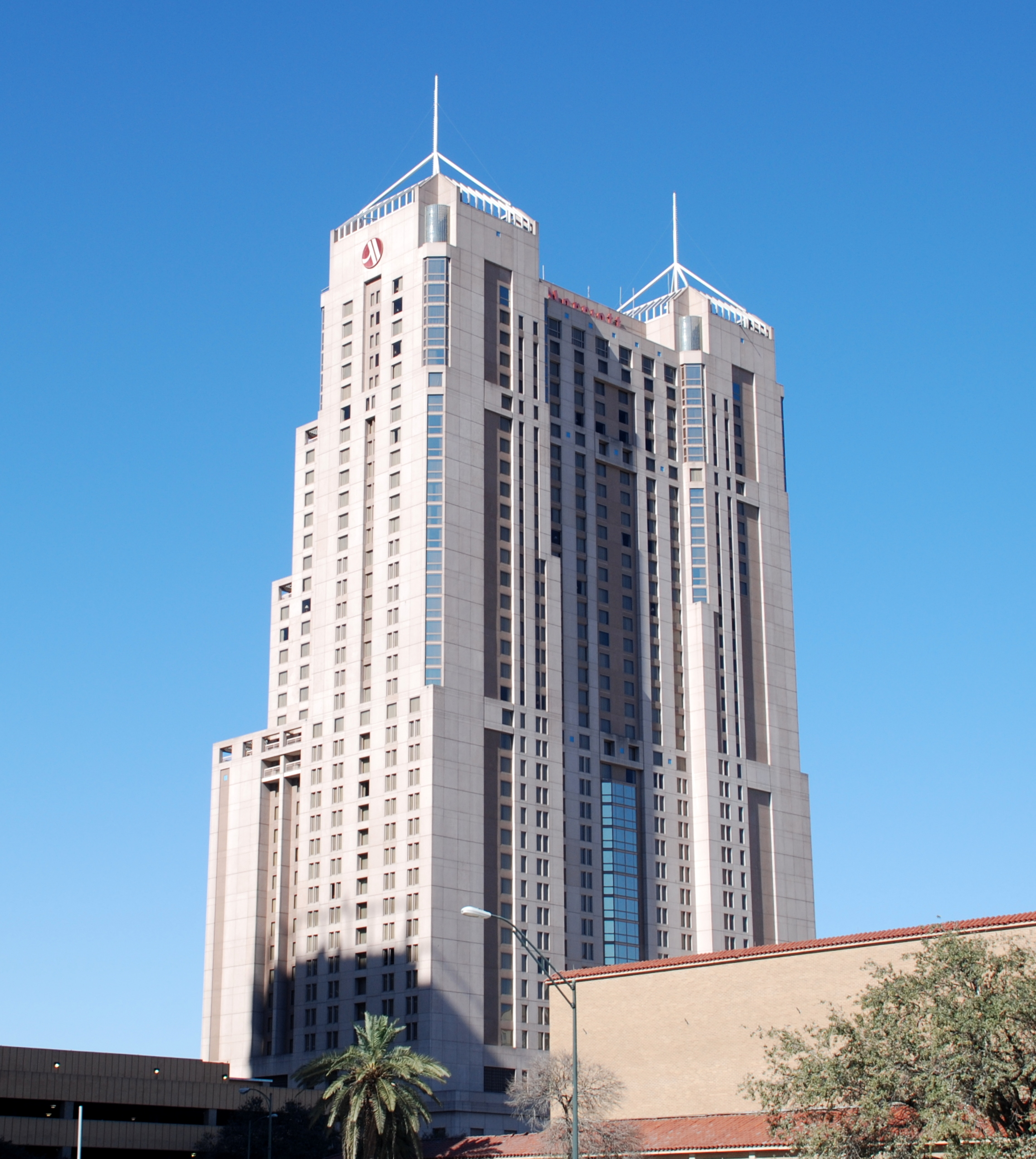
- Interactive map of the San Antonio Marriott Rivercenter on the River Walk area

General information
- Type: hotel
- Location: 101 Bowie St, San Antonio, Texas
- Completed: 1988

Height
- Height: 546 feet (166 m)

Website
- www.marriott.com/en-us/hotels/satrc-san-antonio-marriott-rivercenter-on-the-river-walk/overview/

The San Antonio Marriott Rivercenter on the River Walk is a hotel located in San Antonio, Texas, US. At a tip height of 546 feet (166 meters), the 38-floor hotel is the tallest building in San Antonio and second tallest structure in the city (the Tower of the Americas is taller). It is also the tallest hotel in Texas outside of Dallas. Its roof height, however, is 441 feet (134 meters), 3 feet shorter than the Weston Centre.

The hotel, which was completed in 1988, is located across the Riverwalk from the Henry B. Gonzalez Convention Center and overlooks the Rivercenter lagoon, an expansion branch of the San Antonio River Walk. The hotel is connected to the Rivercenter Mall at two levels and has direct access to the Riverwalk. The building was designed by RTKL Associates and is intended to emulate the twin bell towers of Mission Concepcion or the Cathedral of San Fernando.

The hotel is currently owned by Host Hotels and Resorts, along with the neighboring property Marriott RiverWalk located directly across Commerce St.

Both properties are managed by Marriott International.

== In popular culture ==
Exterior shots of the building were used for the purgatory, "13th Floor" home of a newlywed couple that crashed into the building in the short lived Aaron Spelling syndicated television show Heaven Help Us.

== See also ==
- List of tallest buildings in San Antonio

Preceded by Tower Life Building	Tallest Building in San Antonio; 1988—present 166 m	Succeeded by Incumbent
