= Frost Tower =

Frost Tower may refer to:

- Frost Bank Tower in Austin, Texas, USA
- Frost Tower (San Antonio) in San Antonio, Texas, USA
- Frost Tower (Midland, Texas) in Midland, Texas, USA
