= Emily Morgan Hotel (San Antonio) =

Hotel in San Antonio, Texas, U.S.

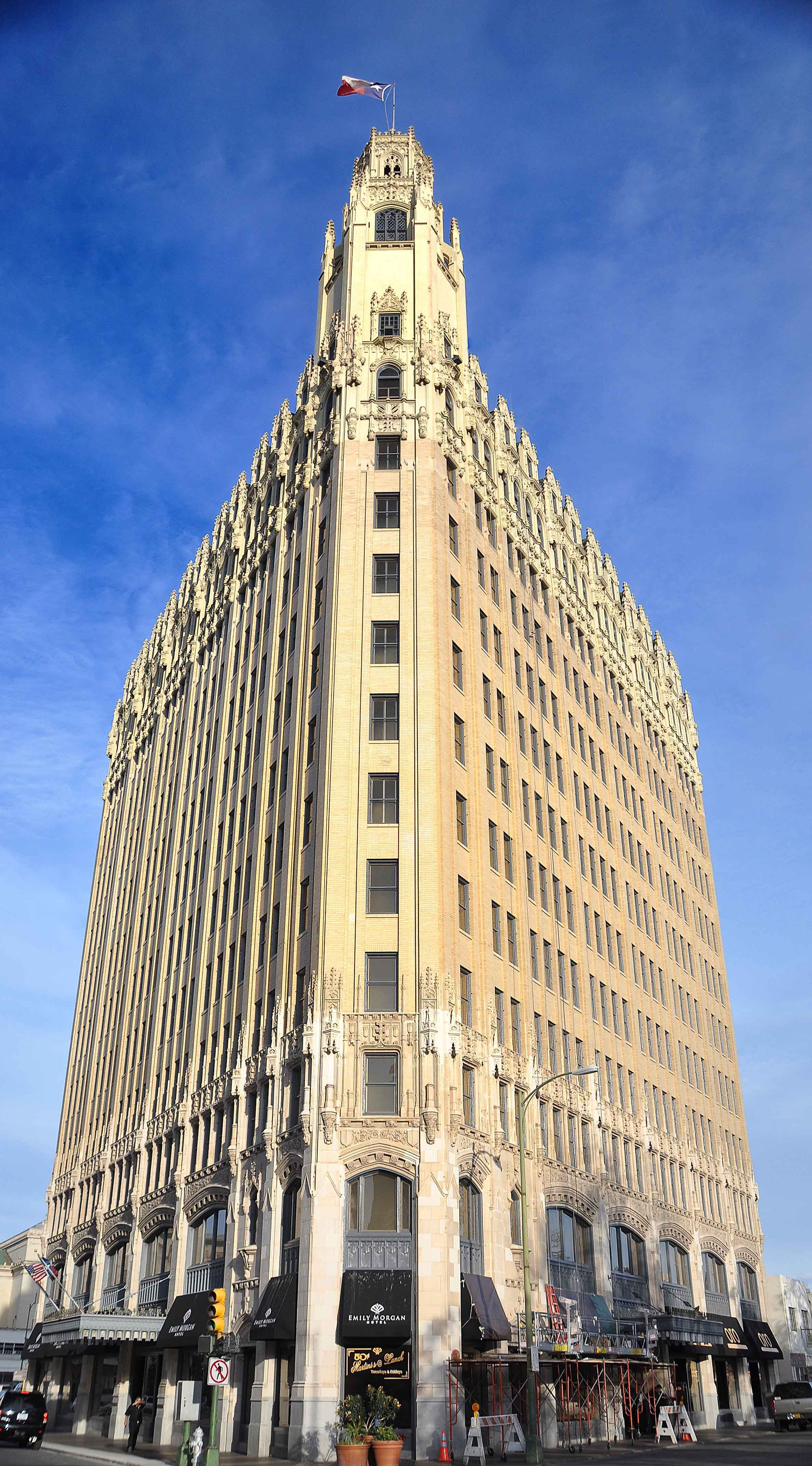
- View of the hotel from below
- Former names: Medical Arts Building

General information
- Location: 705 E Houston Street, San Antonio, Texas, U.S.
- Coordinates: 29.42658°N 98.48575°W
- Completed: 1924

Website
- emilymorganhotel.com

The Emily Morgan Hotel, formerly known as the Medical Arts Building, is a 13-story Neo-Gothic hotel near the Alamo and part of the Alamo Plaza Historic District in San Antonio, Texas, United States. Built in 1924 and standing 205 feet (60 m) tall, it was the tallest building in San Antonio until the Milam Building surpassed it in 1928. The hotel claims to be one of the most haunted locations in San Antonio. The Emily Morgan Hotel was inducted into Historic Hotels of America, an official program of the National Trust for Historic Preservation, in 2015.

== History ==
The building was originally built and designed by architect Ralph Cameron in 1924 as the Medical Arts Building. It housed doctors' offices and a 50-bed hospital. After a succession of owners and the move of the medical facilities elsewhere, it was converted to office space in 1976. In 1984 the building was remodeled and renamed to the Emily Morgan Hotel. The conversion gutted and completely rebuilt the interior of the structure, but kept the exterior elements intact. In 2012 the building went under a multi-million dollar renovation and was bought by the DoubleTree brand of Hilton.

Preceded by South Texas Building	Tallest building in San Antonio; 1924—1928; 60m	Succeeded by Milam Building
