= Frost Tower (Midland, Texas) =

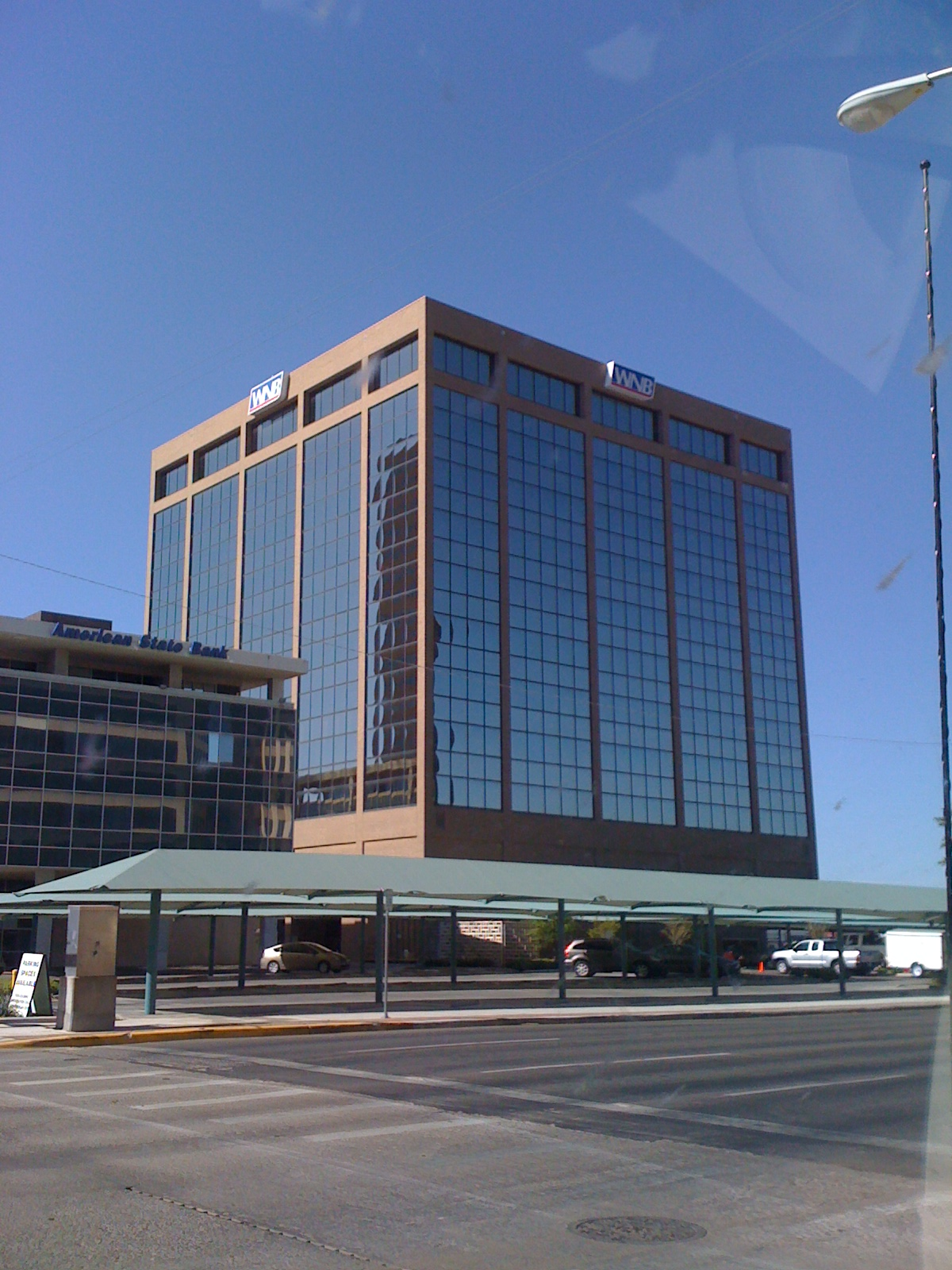
- The Frost Tower in downtown Midland, Texas.

General information
- Status: Completed
- Type: Office building
- Location: Midland, Texas, USA
- Coordinates: 31.997421°N 102.079299°W
- Completed: 1982

Height
- Roof: 115 ft (35 m)

Technical details
- Floor count: 12
- Floor area: 177,744 sq ft (16,513.0 m^{2})
- Lifts/elevators: 4

The Frost Tower (formerly WNB Tower) is a 12-story, 115-foot high-rise building located in downtown Midland, Texas. The second and third levels serve as parking garages. Located at 508 W. Wall Street, the building accommodates various businesses, including oil and gas companies and law firms. Western National Bank was the primary tenant until it was acquired by Frost Bank which now occupies the space. Frost Bank operates a branch in the lobby and maintains its main operations on the tenth floor. The eleventh floor is dedicated to the bank's lending operations and also hosts Private Client Services. Additionally, the ground floor features a small café named "Matteo's Internet Cafe."

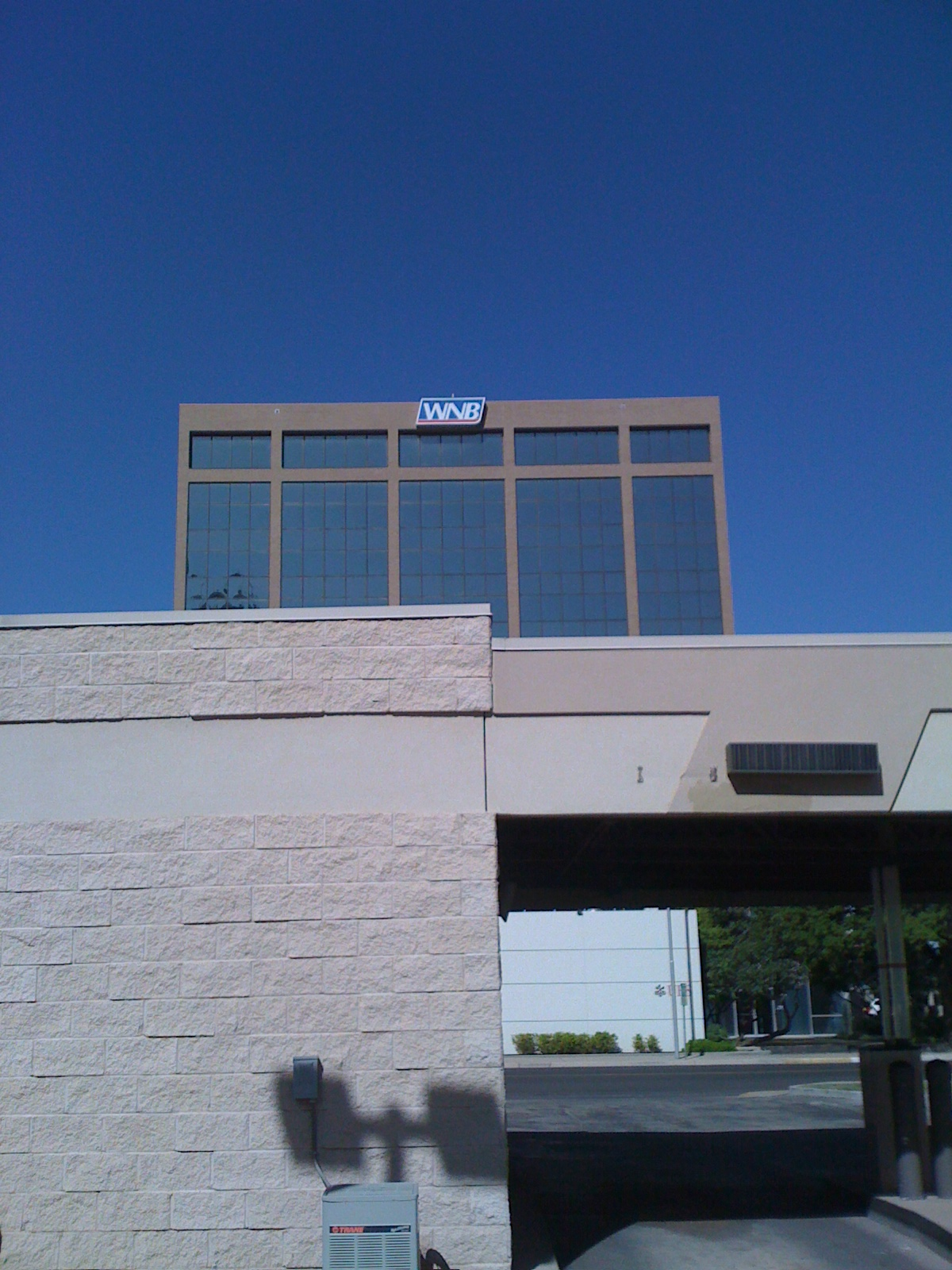
Frost Tower as seen from two blocks away from its drive-thru branch
