= WNB =

WNB or wnb may refer to:

- Wednesday Night Baseball, a live game telecast of Major League Baseball on ESPN
- Western National Bank, a defunct bank based in Texas, United States
- WNB, the station code for Warrnambool railway station, Victoria, Australia
- wnb, the ISO 639-3 code for Wanambre language, Papua New Guinea
