= Houston Street (San Antonio) =

Street in San Antonio, Texas

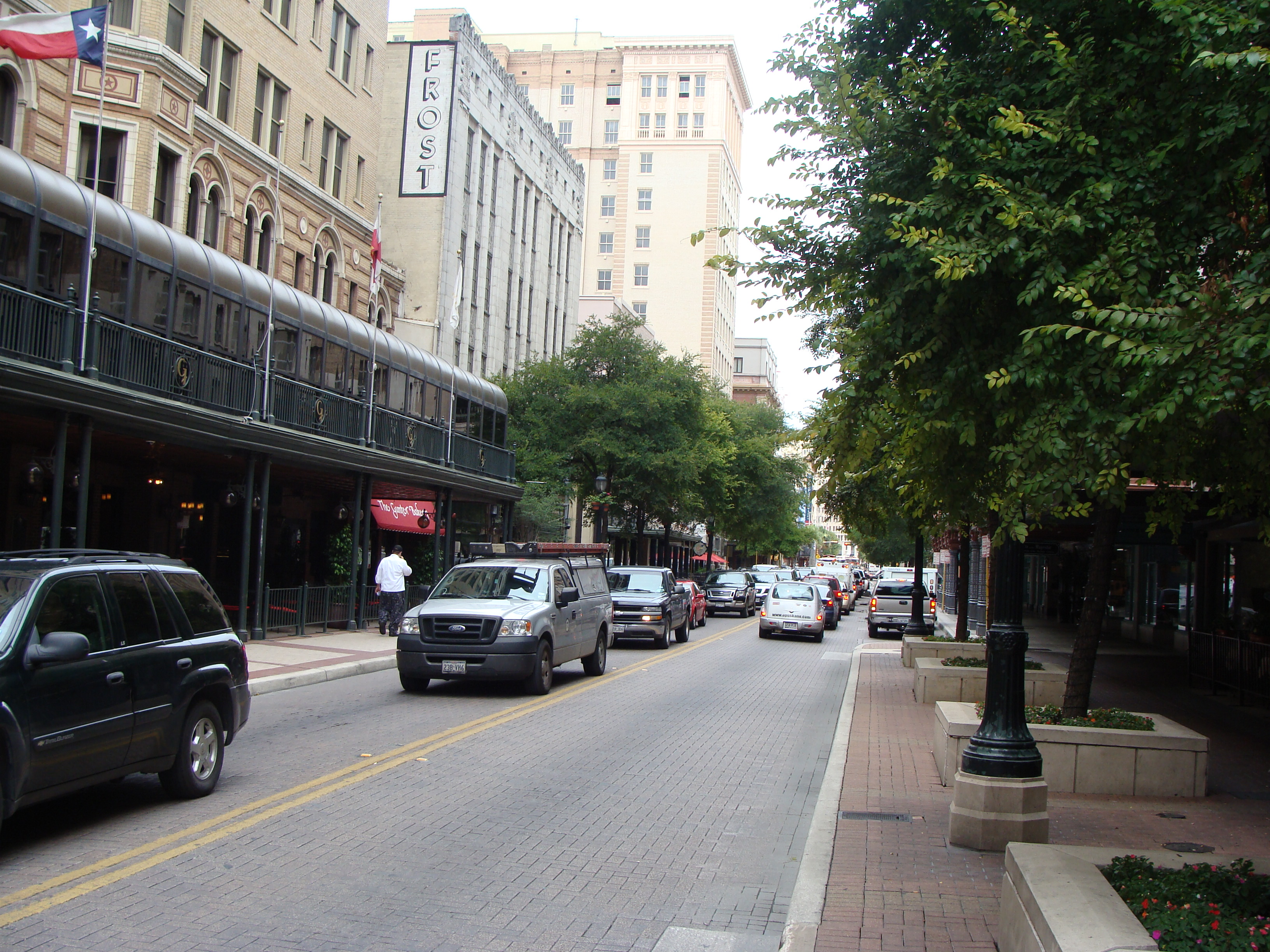
- Eastward view of Houston Street in Downtown San Antonio
- Former name(s): Rivas Street, El Paseo Del Rio
- Location: San Antonio
- Postal code: 78205 and 78207 (Downtown)
- West end: I-35 (Downtown) NW 26th Street (Terminus)
- East end: I-37 (Downtown) FM 1346 (Terminus)

Houston Street is one of San Antonio's oldest and most popular streets. Situated in the middle of the city's central business district, it is a major pedestrian thoroughfare and commercial district. Retail shops, chic restaurants, lofts, office space, and theaters line Houston from the Alamo to Santa Rosa, giving the street its famously eclectic and fashionable reputation.

== History ==
The history of Houston Street is often framed through its relationship with its sister thoroughfare two blocks south: Commerce Street. The two streets serve as part of the east–west backbone of the central business district, with Commerce oriented more towards vehicular traffic and Houston being among the most pedestrian-dense corridors in the city.

=== Early history (1718 to 1870) ===
The road now known as "Houston" was originally called "Rivas Street" east of the river and "El Paseo del Rio" west of it. The two sections formed what was essentially a backroad with limited commercial development. Historically, most of the town's business flowed through the Alameda — now "Commerce Street". The Alameda was the city's most important thoroughfare, as it connected the two town squares: Alamo Plaza and Main Plaza. For the first century and a half of its existence, this road prospered as the city's main street and center of gravity. However, by the late 19th century, Commerce Street had become overburdened by grime, congestion, and the stench of mule and horse-drawn vehicles.

=== Growth and Prosperity (1871 to 1969) ===
The Maverick family — one of the city's wealthiest and most well-connected political families — owned a significant amount of property along Rivas Street. In 1871, the newly-modernized road was renamed "Houston Street", four years after the Alameda's transformation into "Commerce Street". Due in large part to less commercial and vehicular activity along the street, Houston was a much cleaner avenue than that of its southerly sister, a fact that the Maverick family was keen on advertising.

In 1882, store owners along Commerce Street rejected an attempt to widen the road to pave the way for mule-driven streetcars. The merchants and businessmen of the area reasoned that Commerce was too congested and developed to accommodate a widening for streetcars. The Maverick family and other Houston Street property owners jumped at the opportunity to attract more attention to their properties and, shortly thereafter, all streetcar traffic in the city was routed through Houston.

Houston Street roared to life at the dawn of the streetcar age, a period that lasted for 55 years in San Antonio. The electrification of the streetcars in 1890 further solidified its reputation as a clean, enjoyable, and accessible experience for shoppers.

== Trivia ==
- Being adjacent to The Alamo where the Battle of the Alamo occurred, some buildings on the street sustained cannon fire during the war.
- A series of eight informational kiosks line Houston Street from Alamo Plaza to Santa Rosa, detailing the history of nearby structures. These kiosks were constructed from old public telephone stands that have been adapted for modern reuse.

== Venues ==
- Alamo Plaza
- Majestic Theater
- Frost Bank Tower
- New Frost Tower
- IBC Centre
- Children's Hospital of San Antonio
- Aztec Theatre
- Old Texas Theatre
- Alameda Theatre
- Empire Theatre
- Emily Morgan Hotel
- Gunter Hotel
