= Tower Life Building =

High-rise building in San Antonio, Texas, U.S.

- U.S. National Register of Historic Places
- U.S. National Historic Landmark
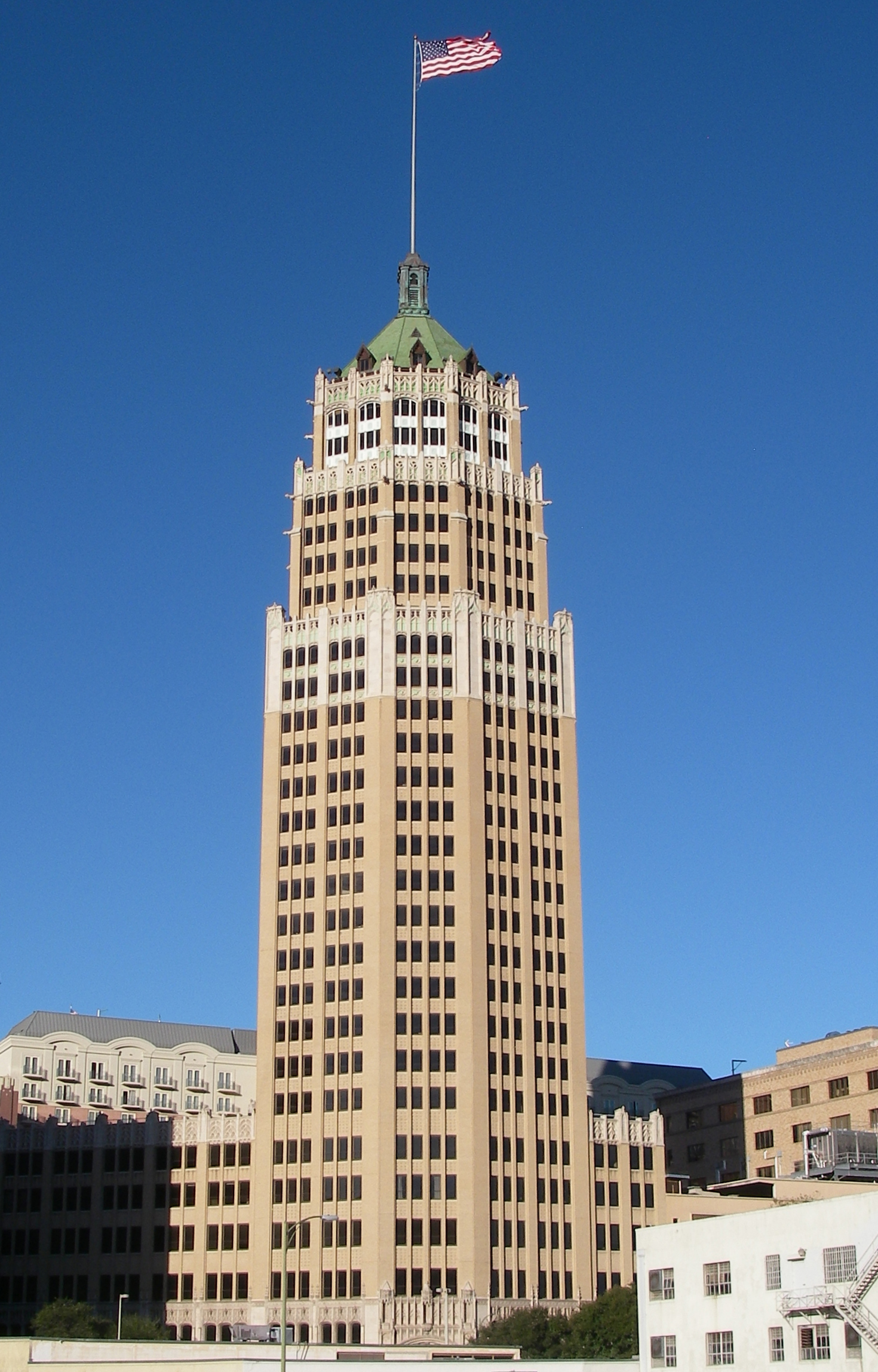
- The Tower Life Building in 2011

- Location within Texas
- Interactive map showing the location of Tower Life Building
- Location: 310 South St Mary's Street, San Antonio, Texas, U.S.
- Coordinates: 29°25′22″N 98°29′29″W
- Built: 1929
- Architects: Robert M. Ayres and Atlee Ayres of Ayres & Ayres
- Architectural style: Late Gothic Revival
- NRHP reference No.: 91001682
- Added to NRHP: November 13, 1991

Tower Life Building (formerly Smith-Young Tower, Pan-American Tower, and Transit Tower) is a 31-story building and a historical landmark in Downtown San Antonio, Texas, United States, Completed in 1929 and standing at 404 feet (123 m) tall, Tower Life Building was the tallest building and structure in San Antonio until the Tower of the Americas was completed in 1968, and the Marriott Rivercenter surpassed it as the tallest building in San Antonio in 1988. As of 2023, Tower Life Building is the 4th tallest building in San Antonio and the tallest eight-sided structure in the United States.

Designed by noted local architectural firm Ayres & Ayres (Atlee & Robert M. Ayres), the neo-gothic tower has a brick and terra-cotta octagonal exterior, featuring gothic elements (such as grotesques and gargoyles) and an iconic green roof of Ludowici tile. The internal structure is reinforced concrete on the lower floors, and steel frame on the upper floors.

A television transmission antenna topped the tower from 1953 until 2010, when the tower reverted to the original design of a copper tophouse with a 114 ft (35 m) tall flagpole. In 1991 the building was placed on the National Register of Historic Places.

After 78 years of ownership by the H. B. Zachry Family, the building was purchased in May 2022 by an ownership group composed of San Antonio developers Ed Cross, Jon Wiegand, and McCombs Enterprises. This ownership group plans to usher in new era for the building as a residence with 244 units for rent, expected to be completed in 2026.

== Greater 1920s Development ==
Originally known as Smith-Young Tower, the tower was the central component of a partially completed 1920s development called the Bowen Island Skyscrapers. The other completed building in the development is the former Plaza Hotel (also designed by Ayres & Ayres and opened in 1927), which became the local outlet of Hilton Hotels in 1956 and was converted into the Granada Apartments in 1966. Subsequent structures in the development were never built as a direct result of the Stock Market Crash of 1929 and the Great Depression.

== Sears, Roebuck & Company ==
The tower housed San Antonio's first Sears, Roebuck & Company store, originally occupying the building's basement and first 4 levels. Opening on March 7, 1929, Sears, Roebuck & Co. was the first portion of the building opened to the public, with 35,000 items on display and 225 members of staff.

A famous purchase at this Sears, Roebuck & Co. took place on November 17, 1934 when San Antonio Postmaster Dan Quill purchased multiple wedding rings from the jewelry counter on behalf of his friend Lyndon Baines Johnson, who was getting married later that day. Uncertain of the size, 12 wedding rings were purchased, with the one fitting Lady Bird Johnson's finger – and ultimately being selected – costing $2.98.

Sears, Roebuck & Company Original Merchandise Layout
Basement	Heavy Merchandise and Cross Section: 130 light fixtures with 550 lightbulbs; Electrical appliances big and small; Radio department; Automobile tires and supplies; Sports and hunting equipment; Luggage; Kids toys and games; and; Tools.
Street Level	Jewelry Counters (at store entrance); Men's and boys' clothing (to left); Ladies' purses, gloves, and umbrellas (in center); Men's and boys' clothing (to right); Ladies hosier (adjacent to entrance); Drugs and toilet articles/notions (just back of room center); Division of gifts and oriental novelties near drugs (in center); Candies (to right of elevators); Phonograph records, player-piano rolls, and sheet music (immediately behind candies); Shoes and boots (at back of room on one side); Soda fountain and luncheonette (on the other side); and; Typewriters, books, stationery, and adding machines.
Floor 2	Women's and Infants: Woman's ready-to-wear with full length mirrors and dressing rooms; - Infants wear with staff in nurse uniforms; Linens, towels, and lingerie; and; Restrooms for women.
Floor 3	Household Furnishings: Furniture, lamps, rugs; Chinaware, glassware, and kitchen; Three display bathrooms "showing the newest color arrangements and the most modern plumbing fixtures"; and; Musical instruments.
Floor 4	Sears, Roebuck & Co. Administrative Offices and Reserve Stock

== Names through Time ==
The building's original owner was Smith-Young Properties, a partnership formed by brothers J.H. (Jim) Smith and F.A. (Albert) Smith with developer and businessman Judge J.W. Young. The building was therefore named Smith-Young Tower, and Smith-Young Property's offices were based on the 11th floor. When Smith-Young Tower emerged from receivership under a new owner (Dallas Rupe & Son., Inc.) in the mid-1930s, a competition was held for newspaper readers to write in with suggestions of a new name for the tower. The winning entry was submitted by school teachers Mr. & Mrs. Howard Doolittle, and the tower's name was changed to Pan-American Tower in 1938. In 1942, the building was renamed Transit Tower for the San Antonio Transit Company, which was purchased by Dallas Rupe & Son., Inc. and had its headquarters in the building. On December 15, 1943, the tower was acquired by Citizens Republic Life Insurance company. In 1960, the insurance company announced it would change its name to Tower Life Insurance company, and the name of the building would change to Tower Life Building.

Tower Name	Years Used
Smith-Young Tower	1929-1938
Pan-American Tower	1938-1942
Transit Tower	1942-1959
Tower Life Building	1960-Present

== Popular culture ==
=== Film ===
Tower Life Building's exterior is featured prominently in the 1984 movie Cloak & Dagger. The building also appears in the background of scenes in the 2000 movie Miss Congeniality.

=== Television ===
- The tower was featured in Season 1, Episode 9: "Roads to Nowhere" of the History Channel Docuseries Life After People which aired in June 2009. The sprogram egment outlined a scenario of both The Alamo and the Tower Life Building's deterioration and ultimate collapsed over a 50-year, post-people timeframe.
- The tower's analog TV antenna removal and flagpole reinstallation was documented in Season 4, Episode 2: "Sky High Texas Tower" of the National Geographic Channel program "World's Toughest Fixes" which aired in October 2010.

== Myths ==
Contrary to frequently-repeated stories along the River Walk by tour barge guides, neither of the initial owners (Jim Smith nor Albert Smith) ended their lives by jumping from the tower during the Great Depression.

== Images ==
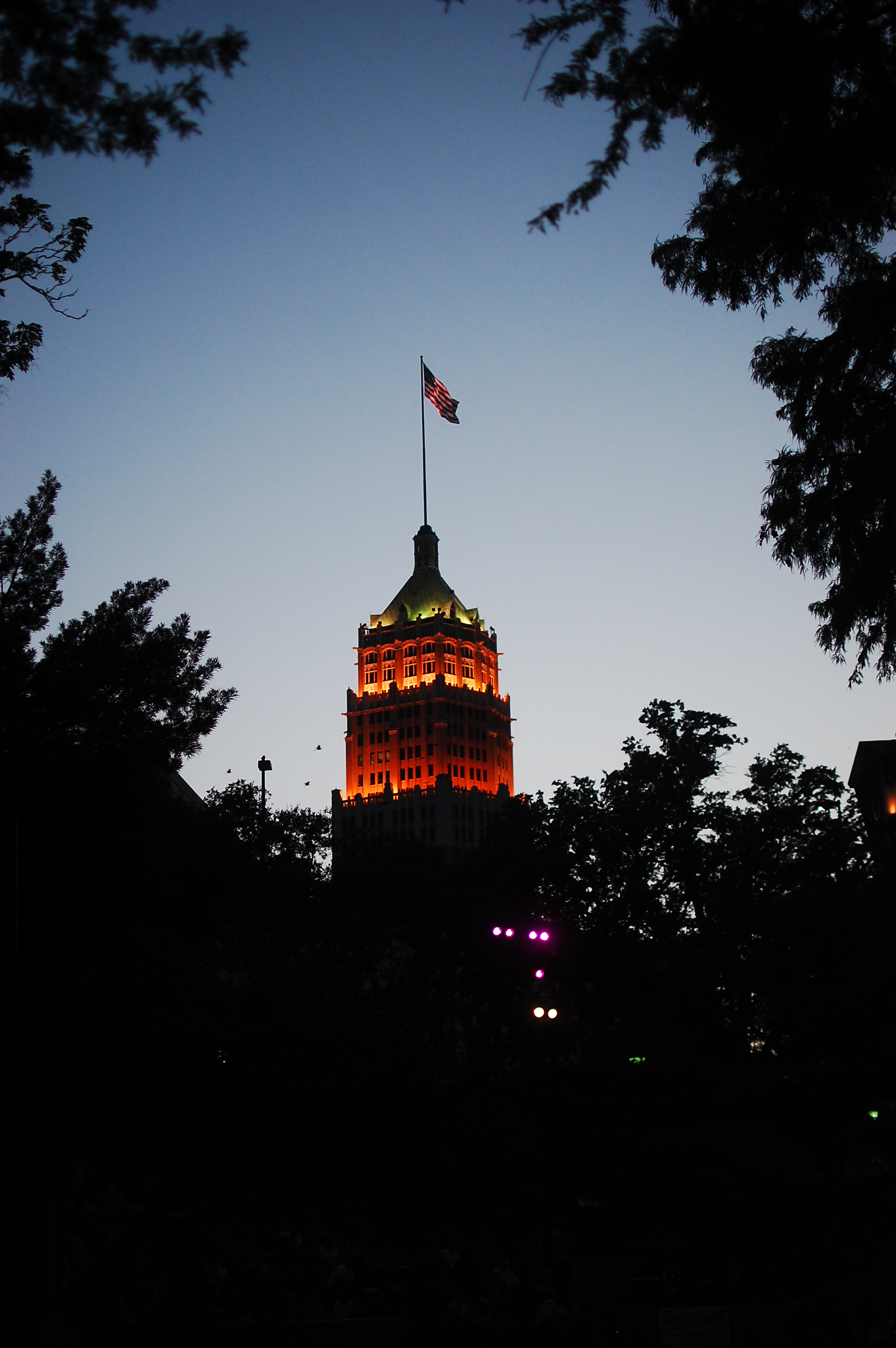
The Tower Life Building at sunset, from 2012.

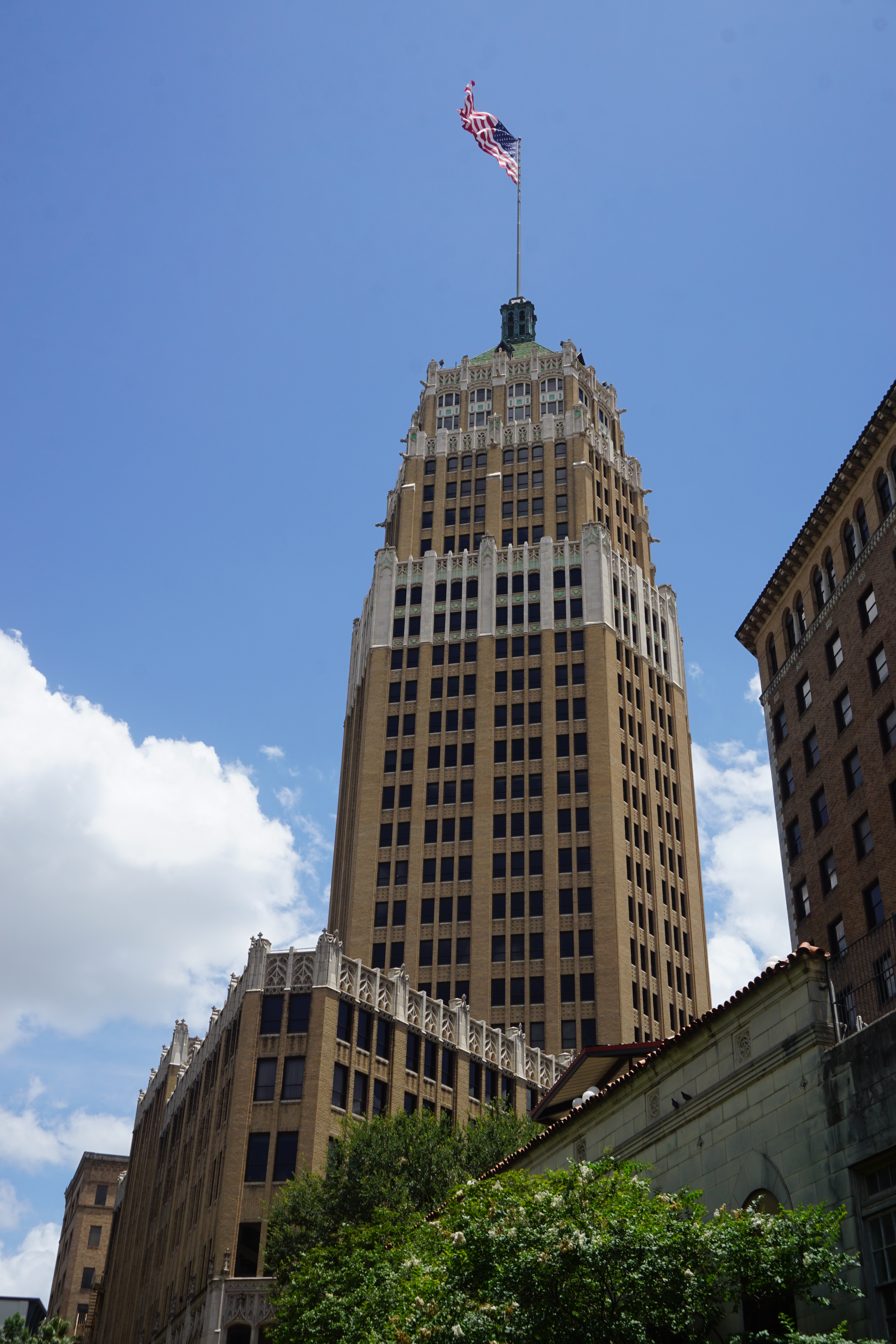
Tower Life Building as viewed from the River Walk

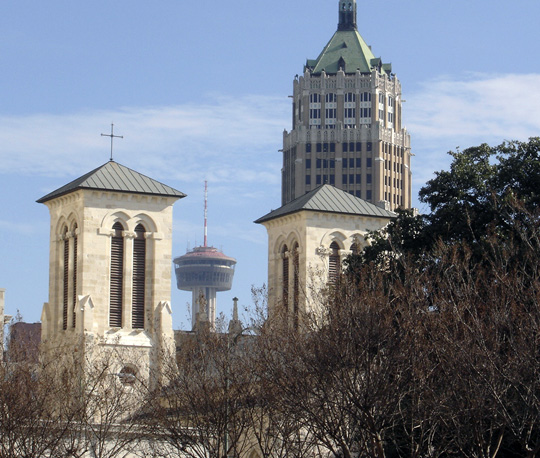
The building is seen in the background to the right, behind the San Fernando Cathedral.

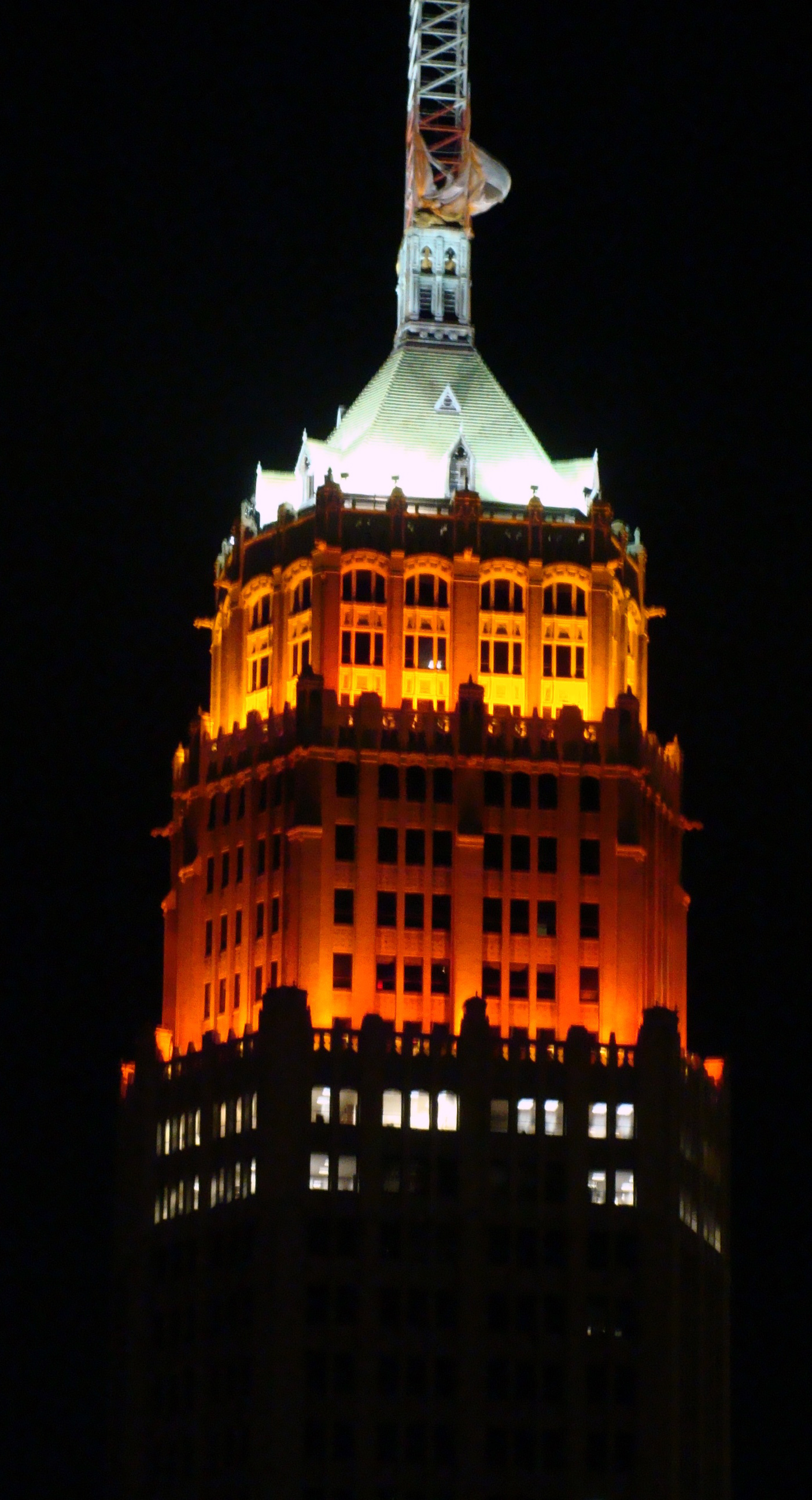

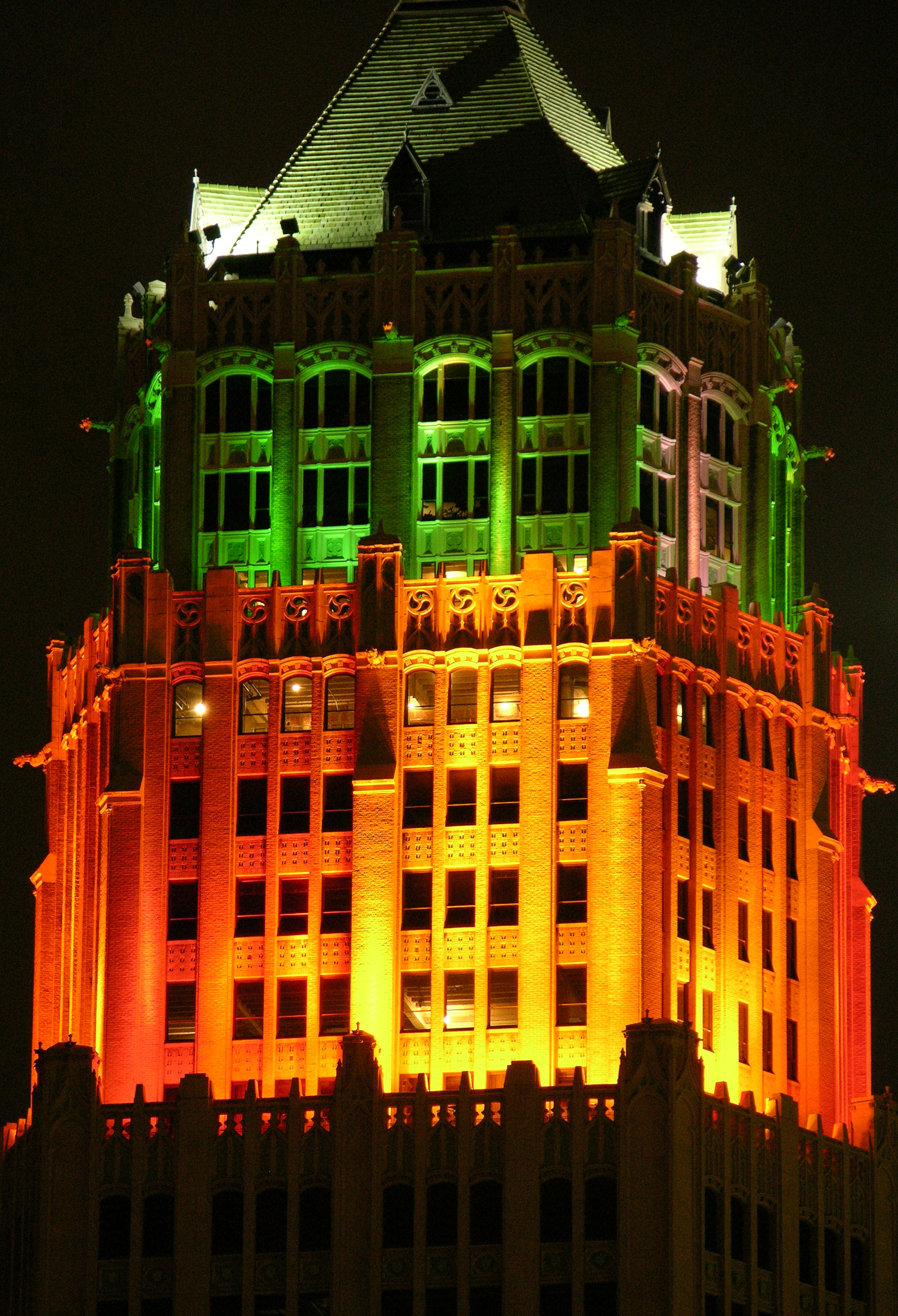

== See also ==
- Tower of the Americas
- Menger Hotel
- Emily D. West
- Late Gothic Revival Architecture

== Bibliography ==
- Cocke, Stephanie Hetos; Dase, Amy E. (November 13, 1991). "NRHP Registration Form: Smith-Young Tower" (PDF). Texas Historic Sites Atlas. Texas Historical Commission.
- Cocke, Stephanie Hetos (November–December 1989). "Atlee B. and Robert M. Ayres" (PDF). Texas Architect. Archived from the original on October 12, 2022.
- "Sears, Roebuck Opens in Smith-Young Tower". San Antonio Light. March 6, 1929. p. 19.

Preceded by Milam Building	Tallest Building in San Antonio; 1929—1988; 123m	Succeeded by Marriott Rivercenter
