= Grand Hyatt San Antonio =

Luxury high-rise condominium and hotel in San Antonio Texas

Coordinates: 29.4219°N 98.4839°W

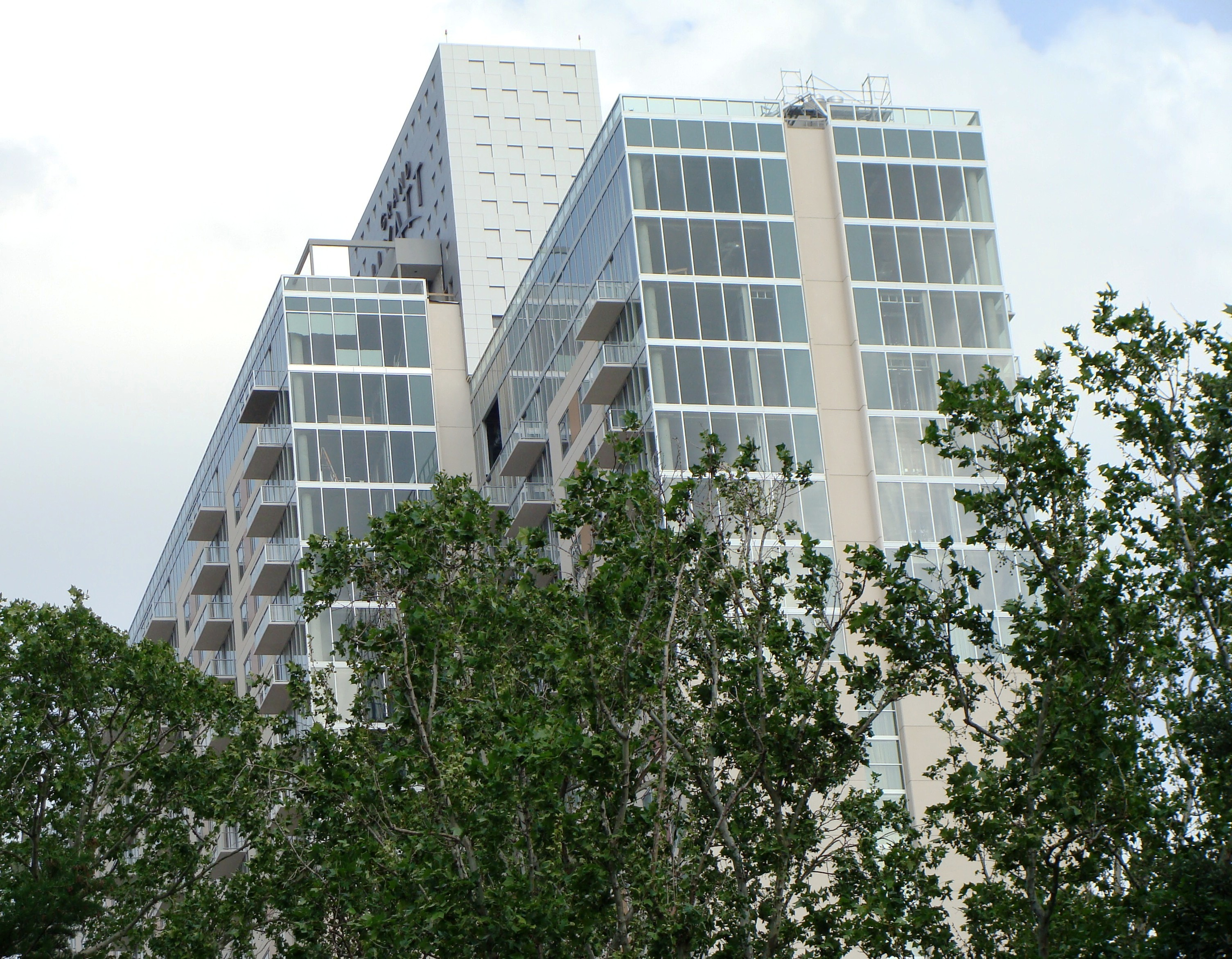

The Grand Hyatt San Antonio is a 34-story, 1,003 room hotel in Downtown San Antonio, Texas, built in 2008. It is the tallest building constructed in the city during the 2000s, the second tallest hotel in the city, and the third tallest skyscraper overall in the city.

It is 129 metres (423 ft) tall, and is located adjacent to and connected with the Henry B. González Convention Center.

The building was designed by the firms Arquitectonica and Kell Munoz Architects, and is mixed residential/commercial (hotel) use.

== See also ==
- List of tallest buildings in San Antonio
