= Milam Building =

Historic high-rise building in San Antonio, Texas, U.S.

- U.S. National Register of Historic Places
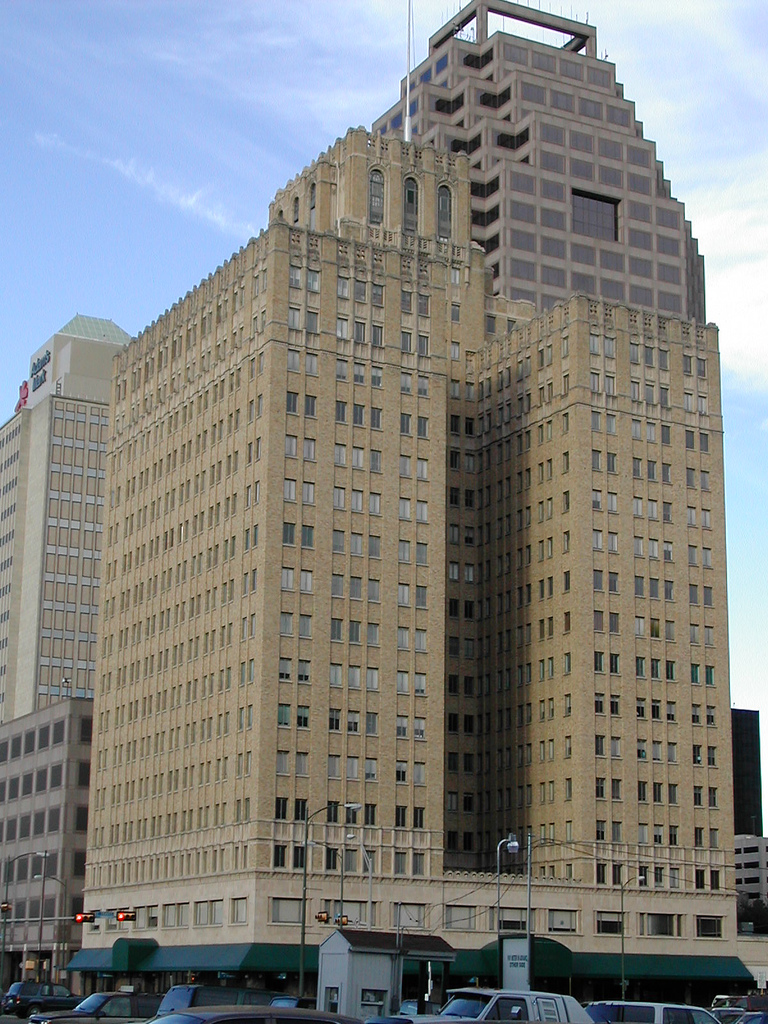
- The Milam Building in 2006

- Location within Texas Location within the United States
- Location: 115 E Travis Street, San Antonio, Texas, U.S.
- Coordinates: 29°25′39″N 98°29′34″W
- Built: 1928
- Architect: Willis, George
- NRHP reference No.: 15000246
- Added to NRHP: May 18, 2015

The Milam Building is a historic 21-story building in downtown San Antonio, Texas, United States. Built in 1928, it was the tallest building in San Antonio and the tallest brick and reinforced concrete structure in the United States standing at 280 feet (90 m). It is also known to be the first high-rise air-conditioned office building in the United States. The building was designed by George Willis, engineered by M.L. Diver, and constructed by L.T. Wright and Company. The building was named in honor of the Republic of Texas historical figure Benjamin Milam, noted for his leadership during the Texas Revolution. In keeping with that motif, the only flag that flies atop the tower is the Lone Star flag.

== History ==
The Milam Building has undergone many events, including fires, foreclosure, and ownership changes. It was owned by Principal Mutual Life Insurance Co. of Des Moines, Iowa while the law firm of Maloney & Maloney occupied the top three floors. The 1950s had a tenancy by Mobil, Shell, the Railroad Commission of Texas, and Exxon used the building for their Texas headquarters, before they moved to Houston. The 1960s saw a tenancy by the men's clothing firm Hutchins Brothers in the specially designed Argyle Room as a permanent retail store within the building.

George Willis was the architect of the building. The Milam Building was listed on National Register of Historic Places in 2014. The building was the first high rise office building in the world that was completely air conditioned and the first high rise that was built with no steel girders, only reinforced concrete.

== Design ==
The building contains 210,851 square-feet within the tower structure and it was the first office building in the United States with built-in air conditioning when constructed. The general contractor was L.T. Wright and Company and the architect was George Willis, a student of Frank Lloyd Wright. The building engineer was M. L. Diver. The building was named after Colonel Ben Milam, a leader in the Texas revolution.

The Milam Company advertising proclaimed air conditioning as the building's principal feature, naming it Carrier's "Manufactured Weather." The building shares an architectonic character with New York's seminal Barclay-Vesey Building. Exterior ornamentation is kept to a minimum, except at the top of the building.

== Air-conditioning system ==
This early air conditioner system was modeled from a German mine shaft compressor. Large ice chunks were deposited in the building's basement to aid the chilling unit. The 18 feet (10 m) long chiller remained in service until October 1989. Its 60 years of service was trumpeted by Carrier as proving good design leading to longevity. In designing and executing this installation, and creating an artificial climate, at least nine new mechanical construction problems had to be addressed not previously encountered in skyscrapers. In short, the deal between Travis Investment Company and Carrier Engineering resulted in the first high-rise, fully air conditioned, office building in the United States. The installation between Travis Investment Company and Carrier Engineering resulted in the first high-rise, fully air conditioned, office building in the United States.

The American Society of Mechanical Engineers recognized that Carrier's "Manufactured Weather" had many benefits. Cooled offices helped in tenant retention. The office environment became more efficient and hospitable due to the elimination or reduction of unwanted elements. The building owners also found they could charge a premium of 10 to 15 percent more rent for air conditioned offices.

== See also ==
- List of tallest buildings in San Antonio

Preceded by Emily Morgan Hotel	Tallest Building in San Antonio; 1928—1929; 90 m	Succeeded by Tower Life Building
