= Central Trust Company Building =

Coordinates: 29.426781°N 98.489906°W

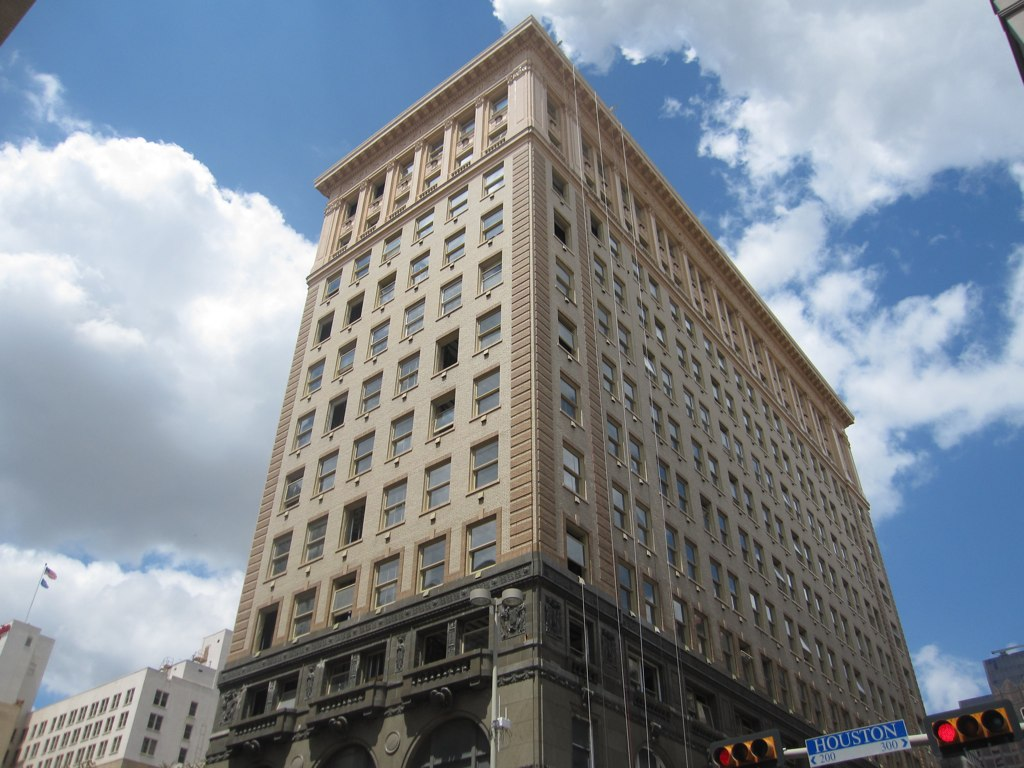

The 1919 era building was originally named the Central Trust Company Building but it is now more commonly known as the South Texas Building. The building was built as the headquarters for the Central Trust Company, a financial institution that collapsed during the Great Depression in 1931. It is a historic twelve-story building in San Antonio, Texas, United States.

The building, designed by Fort Worth based architectural firm Sanguinet and Staats, is an example of early Beaux Arts office tower architecture. Opening to great fanfare on December 22, 1919 it was the tallest building in the city. In 1947, the green granite base of the building was significantly altered by noted local architecture firm Ayres & Ayres which converted the base of the building into a modern, post-war retail storefront.

In 1982 the building was completely renovated into modern office space and the original 1919 facade was restored to its original design. As part of that effort an application to place the building on the National Register of Historic Places was submitted and the building was placed on the NRHP on August 11, 1982 (NRHP Reference / ID: 82004492).

A subsequent renovation of the building converted it into a 128 room Home2 Suites by Hilton hotel that opened in 2012.

| Preceded by Saint Anthony Hotel | Tallest Building in San Antonio; 1919—1924; 46m | Succeeded by Emily Morgan Hotel |
