= Bank of America Plaza (San Antonio) =

Skyscraper in San Antonio Texas

Coordinates: 29.4295°N 98.4900°W

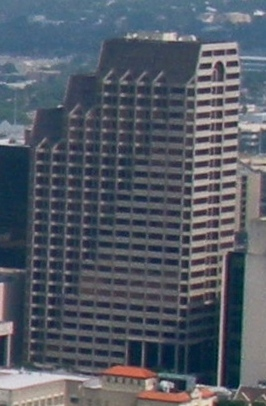

General information
- Status: Completed
- Completed: 1984
- Height: 387 ft (118 m)

Technical details
- Floor count: 28
- Floor area: 533,171 sq ft (49,533.2 m^{2})

Design and construction
- Architect(s): Skidmore, Owings & Merrill

The Bank of America Plaza is a skyscraper in San Antonio, Texas, USA. It opened in 1984 as Interfirst Bank Plaza, was designed by the Houston office of Skidmore, Owings and Merrill and is 28 stories high. The building has a postmodern design and a roof height of 387 feet (118 meters).

It is the largest office building in the city with 533,171 feet of office space. It is also the city's 6th tallest building.

In 2016 a piece of art called Kinetic Skyline was installed on the side of Bank of America Plaza. USAA purchased the building in downtown San Antonio on August 14, 2017, but ended its deal to move 2,000 employees into downtown offices with the City of San Antonio and Bexar County in spring of 2022.

== In popular culture ==
The building was used for establishing shots in the opening credits and in episodes for the offices of the title character in the short lived NBC television series "J.J. Starbuck."

== See also ==
- List of tallest buildings in San Antonio
