= Nix Professional Building =

Skyscraper in San Antonio, Texas (USA)

Coordinates: 29°25′32″N 98°29′23″W

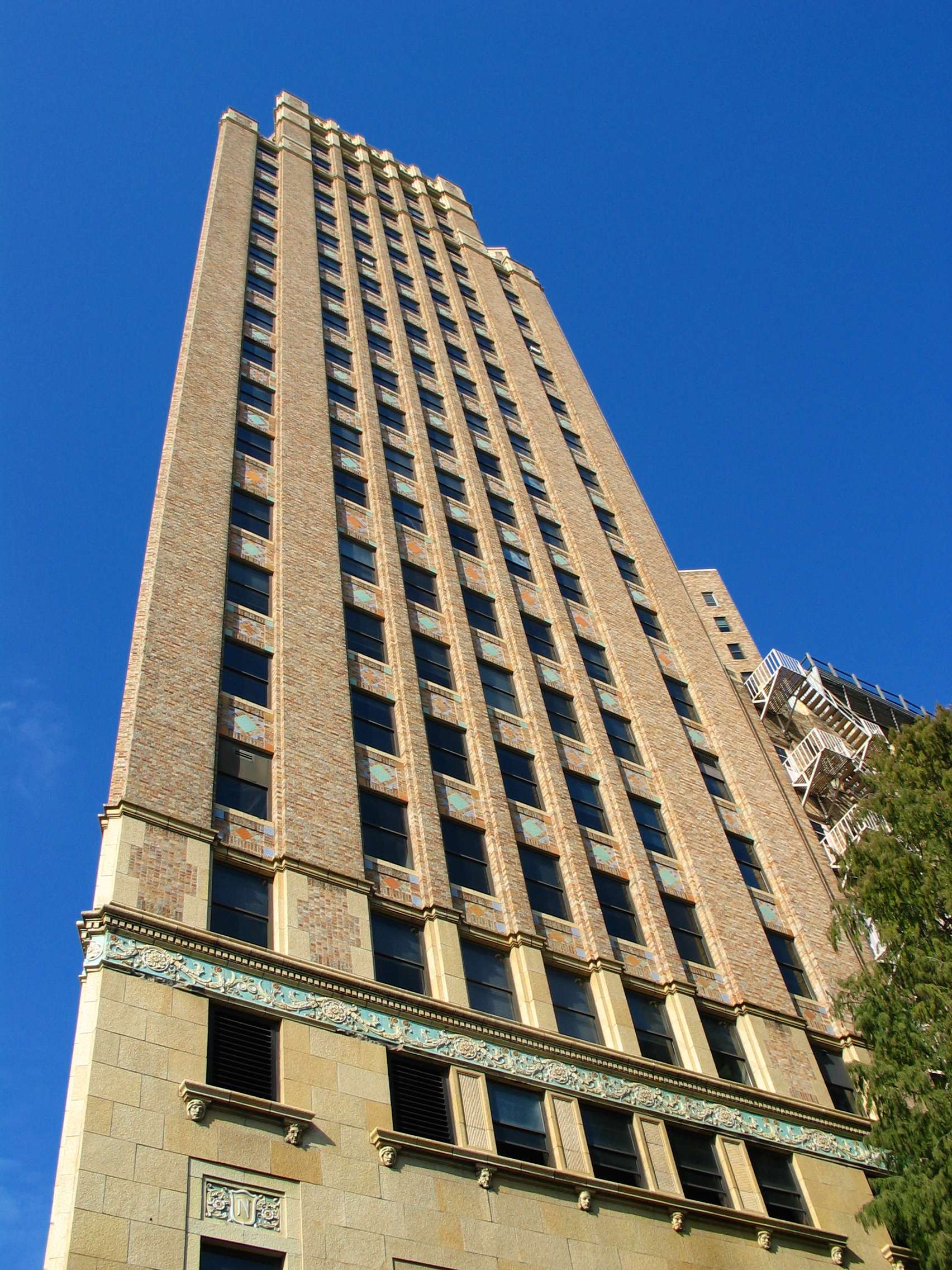

The Nix Professional Building is a 23-story hospital in downtown San Antonio, Texas, US.

At the time of its completion, this was the largest and tallest hospital in the United States. It was also the only hospital with doctor's offices, hospital beds, and a parking garage all in one building. It currently stands as the 10th tallest building in the city.

== See also ==
- List of tallest buildings in San Antonio
