= George Rodney Willis =

American architect

- Born: August 11, 1879; Chicago, Illinois, U.S.
- Died: January 22, 1960 (aged 80)
- Education: Art Institute of Chicago
- Occupation: Architect
- Spouse: Louise Scott

George Rodney Willis (August 11, 1879 – January 22, 1960), was an American architect associated with the Prairie School and the Oak Park, Illinois studio of Frank Lloyd Wright who thereafter had a successful career in California and in Texas.

== Early life ==
George Willis was born in Chicago, Illinois, on August 11, 1879, to Byron and Mary (Rodney) Willis. George was the third of four children. His mother was a descendant of Caesar Rodney, who cast Delaware's vote for the Declaration of Independence.

== Education and Architectural Practice in Chicago ==
Willis attended Chicago public schools and enrolled in the Art Institute of Chicago in 1899, affiliated with the Armour Institute (now Illinois Institute of Technology). In his last year of school Willis began working in the Oak Park, Illinois, studio of architect Frank Lloyd Wright, for whom he served as draftsman for four years, rising to the position of head draftsman. During his years with Wright, he worked with draughtsmen and architects who were important practitioners of Prairie School architecture, including Barry Byrne, William Eugene Drummond, Marion Mahony, Isabel Roberts and Walter Burley Griffin. As Wright's son John Lloyd Wright recorded:

William Drummond, Francis Barry Byrne, Walter Burley Griffin, Albert McArthur, Marion Mahony, Isabel Roberts and George Willis were the draftsmen. Five men, two women. They wore flowing ties, and smocks suitable to the realm. The men wore their hair like Papa, all except Albert, he didn't have enough hair ... I know that each one of them was then making valuable contributions to the pioneering of the modern American architecture for which my father gets the full glory, headaches and recognition today!

== Architecture Practice in Texas ==
Willis moved to California in 1904 and worked for Myron Hunt. Projects on the boards during the time that Willis worked with Hunt and his partner Elmer Grey include:the Edith Daniels House, in Aradia, CA (1904), the Livingston Jenks House, San Rafael, CA (1904), the Astronomer's House (a.k.a. The Monastery) and other buildings, at the Mount Wilson Observatory, Mount Wilson, CA (1904), the Thomas H. Foote House, East Colorado Street, Pasadena, CA (1905), and the J.W. Gillespie House, in Montecito, CA.

Then, Willis moved to Dallas, and formed a partnership with Stewart Moore in 1906. From 1907 to 1909 he worked with J. Edward Overbeck in a practice known as Overbeck and Willis. They collaborated on the expansive J. T. Trezevant House along Turtle Creek of 1907, providing Dallas with one of the two most imposing Prairie houses in Texas. In 1910 Willis was practicing alone in Dallas.

== Work in San Antonio ==
In 1911, he moved to San Antonio, Texas and was employed by Atlee B. Ayres until 1916, where he produced Prairie Style homes for Frank Winerich (1913) and Lonnie Wright (1914-1917). Thereafter he formed his own architectural practice.

Among Willis' San Antonio works are the Lawrence T. Wright house (1914-1917), houses in Alamo Heights and Monte Vista, and a grouping of four small apartments at the corner of Bandera Road and E. Skyview, providing fine Texas example of Prairie School architecture. In 1928 he designed the Milam Building. It was the first office building in the United States with built in air conditioning when constructed and the tallest brick and reinforced concrete structure in the United States when it opened. It was also the first high-rise air-conditioned office building in the United States The air-conditioning design team was led by Willis H. Carrier, founder of the Carrier Engineering Corporation.

Architect Willis also designed or had input in a series of San Antonio landmarks: Builders' Exchange Building; Bexar County Courthouse; San Antonio Municipal Auditorium (1926); San Antonio Country Club (ca 1920) original building (with Atlee B. Ayres); Palace Theatre (1923); Standard Sanitary Manufacturing Warehouse and Office Building (1923); and El Conquistador Tourist Hotel (1927); and Brackenridge Park Amphitheater.

== Personal life ==
Willis met his future wife, Louise Scott, about 1918 in San Antonio. They had no children. Willis was a member of the West Texas chapter of the American Institute of Architects. He maintained his office in the Smith-Young Tower until his death on January 22, 1960.

== Architectural Work - Partial Listing ==
- J. T. Trezevant House, 2925 Cedar Springs Road (along Turtle Creek), Dallas, TX - 1907 (with J. Edward Overbeck)
- Jim Wells County Courthouse, Alice TX – 1912 (with Atlee Ayres)
- Cameron County Courthouse, Brownsville, TX – 1912 (with Atlee Ayres)
- Lawrence T. Wright Residence, 342 Wilkins Avenue, San Antonio, TX - 1912-1917 (with Atlee Ayres)
- Williams-Tarbutton Residence, 626 Lindsey Street, San Marcos, TX – 1912-1914
- Frank Winerich House (later, John J. Kuntz House I), 118 Kings Highway, Monte Vista, San Antonio, TX, 1913
- Robert N. Martindale House, 108 West Kings Highway, San Antonio, TX, 1914 (with Atlee Ayres)
- Marshall Terrell House, 213 west agarita, San Antonio, TX, 1914 (with Atlee Ayres)
- L. E. Cartwright House, Uvalde, TX, 1914 (with Atlee Ayres)
- Graham Hamilton House, 980 Terrell Street, Cuero, TX, 1915 (with Atlee Ayres)
- Alexander Hamilton House, 906 North Esplanade, Cuero, TX, 1915 (with Atlee Ayres)
- Charles M. Cain House, 320 Brahan Blvd., Westfort, San Antonio, TX, 1915 (with Atlee Ayres)
- J. A. Browne House, Brownsville, TX, 1916 (with Atlee Ayres)
- Refugio County Courthouse, 808 Commerce Street, Refugio, TX – 1917 (with Atlee Ayres)
- Dr. Lenma Young Residence, 828 Cambridge Oval, Alamo Heights, San Antonio, TX – c. 1918
- R. B. Cherry House, 218 Huisache Avenue, San Antonio, TX, 1918
- John T. Simmons House, 311 Breeden Street, San Antonio, TX, 1919
- John J. Kuntz House II, 602 Garraty Road, Terrell Hills, San Antonio, TX, 1920
- T. and Maria Apostolon, 900 W. Woodlawn Ave., San Antonio, TX, 1920
- Melrose W. Holmgreen House 306 Terrell Road, San Antonio, TX, 1920
- Vivroux / Traeger / Pedigo House, 503 S Austin St, Seguin, TX, 1923
- San Antonio Country Club, 4100 N New Braunfels Avenue, San Antonio, TX, 1920 (demolished)
- Builders Exchange Building, 152 Pecan Street, San Antonio, TX, 1925 (with Emmett T. Jackson)
- Bexar County Courthouse, between W. Nueva St. and Main Plaza, Dwyer and S. Main Aves., San Antonio, TX, (second unit, with E. T. Jackson)
- San Antonio Municipal Auditorium, 200 East Market Street, San Antonio, TX, 1926 (with Atlee Ayres, Robert M. Ayers and Emmett T. Jackson)
- Milam Building, 115 East Travis Street, San Antonio, TX - 1928
- The Sunken Garden Theater, 3875 N. St. Mary's St., San Antonio, TX, 1937 (with Harvey P. Smith and Charles T. Boelhauwe)
- Mac's Flowers Building, 2806 North Saint Marys Street, San Antonio, TX
- Four Small Apartments, Bandera Road and E. Skyview, San Antonio, TX
