= City Tower (San Antonio) =

Skyscraper in San Antonio, Texas

Coordinates: 29.4262°N 98.4941°W

- City Tower in San Antonio

General information
- Status: Completed
- Location: 100 W. Houston Street; San Antonio, Texas 78205; United States
- Completed: 1975

Height
- Roof: 300 ft (91 m)

Technical details
- Floor count: 22

Design and construction
- Architect: Charles Luckman Associates

City Tower is a skyscraper in downtown San Antonio, in the U.S. state of Texas. The 22-story building previously served as the headquarters for Frost Bank from 1975 to 2019 until Frost Bank moved into the eponymously named Frost Tower.

In 2015 the city of San Antonio acquired the building for $52.9 million and has allotted $88 million for renovations to the building. Upon completion of the renovations the building will consolidate 24 city departments and 1,400 city employees and will serve as the main office building for the city of San Antonio.

At a height of 300 feet (91 meters), it is the 14th tallest building in San Antonio.

== See also ==
- List of tallest buildings in San Antonio
