= Broadway Tower (San Antonio) =

Building in Texas, United States

Coordinates: 29.4654°N 98.4632°W

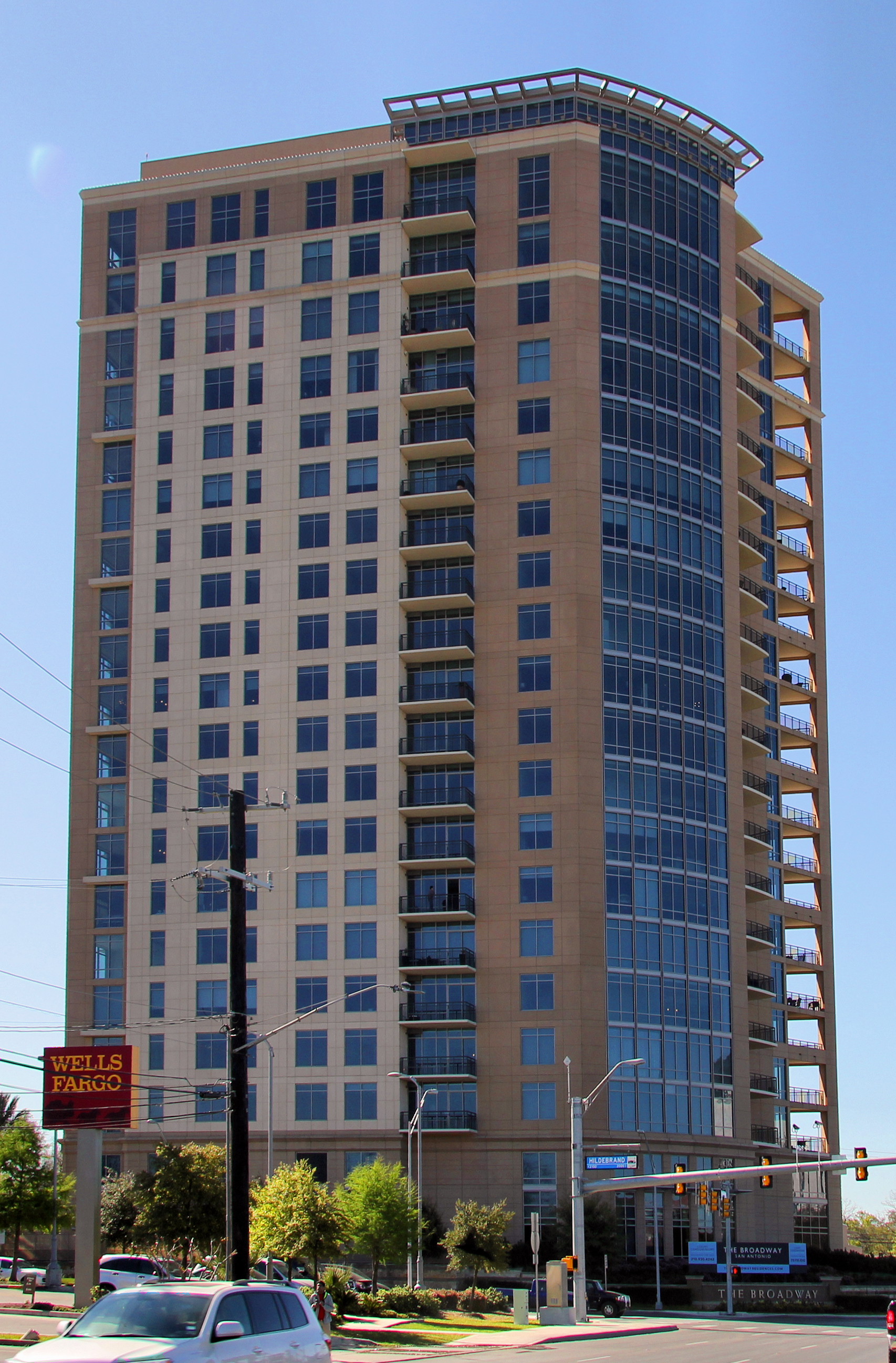
The Broadway tower

The Broadway is a high-rise condominium tower in San Antonio, Texas, United States. It is located northwest of Mahncke Park at the intersection of Hildebrand Avenue and Broadway, east of the University of the Incarnate Word.

The 21-story tower contains 90 residences. It was designed by Ziegler Cooper Architects and completed in 2010.

At an architectural height of 279 feet, The Broadway is the second tallest skyscraper in Midtown San Antonio.
