= Henry B. González Convention Center =

Convention center located in San Antonio Texas

Coordinates: 29°25′15″N 98°29′5″W

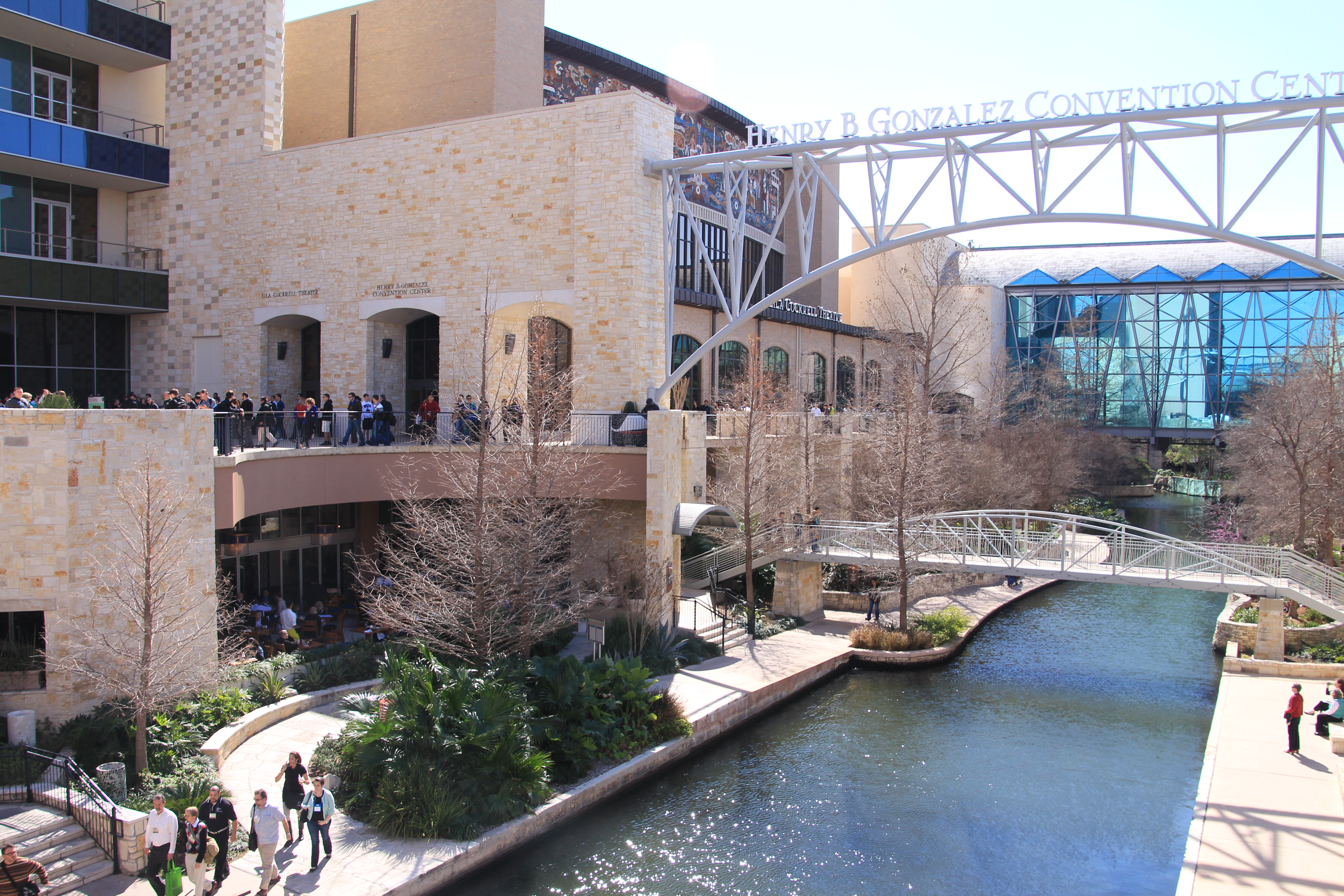
- Convention center viewed from Market Street in 2013
- Interactive map of Henry B. González Convention Center
- Former names: San Antonio Convention Center (1968-1977)
- Address: 900 E. Market Street; San Antonio, TX 78205
- Owner: City of San Antonio

Construction
- Opened: 1968
- Renovated: 1977, 1986, 2001, 2016
- Construction cost: $10.9 million(1968)

Website
- Official Website

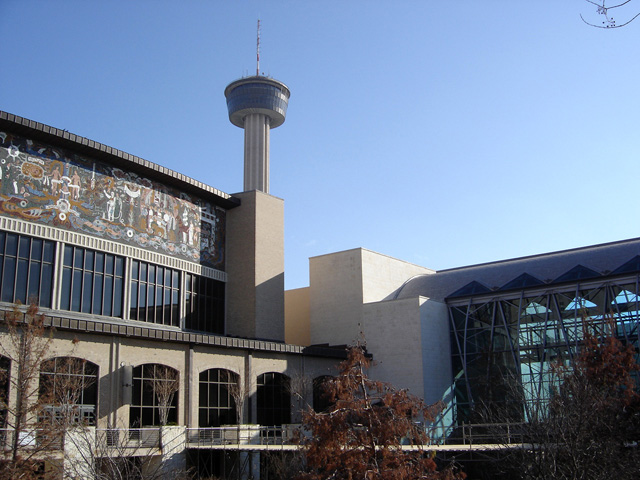
The Henry B. González Convention Center and Lila Cockrell Theater along the San Antonio River Walk. The Tower of the Americas is visible in the background.

The Henry B. González Convention Center (formerly San Antonio Convention Center) is the City of San Antonio's convention center located in Downtown San Antonio, Texas, along the banks of the River Walk.

The facility is a central component in the city's convention industry. The center, named for the late US congressman Henry Barbosa González, hosts more than 300 events each year with over 750,000 convention delegates attending from around the world.

== Facilities ==
The City-owned facility is maintained by San Antonio's Convention and Visitors Bureau and by Downtown Operations. The Police Department provides security for the center.

The facility currently has a 1,600,000 square feet (150,000 m^{2}) footprint, with 203,000 sq ft (18,900 m^{2}) of meeting space, 2 ballrooms, 4 contiguous exhibit halls with over 514,000 sq ft (48,000 m^{2}) and the adjacent 2,319-seat Lila Cockrell Theatre, a performing arts venue which is part of the original construction.

The "Stars at Night" ballroom is the largest in Texas at 54,000 sq ft (5,000 m^{2}). The room features 652 LED lights.

The primary lobby, off of Market Street, features a large interactive $1 million art installation dubbed "Liquid Crystal" and designed by the Jason Bruges Studio in London.

== History ==
=== HemisFair ===
The original convention center was built as part of HemisFair '68 by a joint venture of two general contractors Darragh & Lyda Inc. of San Antonio, Texas and H. A. Lott Inc. of Houston, Texas, but has been significantly altered and expanded since then.

=== 2009 Grand Hyatt connection ===
The Grand Hyatt San Antonio, a 1,003-room convention center hotel and condominium tower designed by architecture firm Arquitectonica and built by Faulkner USA, opened in 2008. The Grand Hyatt provides a direct connection with the rest of the convention center.

=== 2016 expansion ===
In 2016, the city completed a project to expand, renovate and modernize the facility and to create closer integration with Hemisfair and Alamo Plaza. The project included goals to remove fixed interior structures to allow for more flexible use of space, and a major upgrade of the building's technology. The effort was carved from a $550 million bond approved in 2012, and had an initial budget of $325 million. This was the largest capital project in the city's history. Construction was awarded to a joint venture of San Antonio-based Zachary and Indianapolis-based Hunt Construction Group.

The "eastern expansion" started work in February 2014. The "western wing" was demolished to make way for a new entrance, green space and other developments directly related to Hemisfair. This wing included most of the original convention center building from 1968.

The expansion introduced the "Stars at Night" ballroom and the new Market Street lobby.

== Notable events ==
- PAX South drew 40,000 visitors in 2015. The event occurred again in 2016.
