= H.B. Zachry =

Henry Bartell Zachry (1901–1984), also known as H.B. Zachry and Pat Zachry was the founder and former president and chairman of H.B. Zachry Company, the parent company of Zachry Holdings Inc. and Zachry Construction Corporation. He earned a degree in civil engineering from Texas A&M University in 1922 and, after a brief career with the Texas Department of Transportation, founded the H.B. Zachry Company in 1924.

Zachry's firm constructed many significant projects in both Texas and worldwide, including:

- the Hilton Palacio del Rio Hotel in San Antonio, TX using modular construction in a record 202 working days
- the upper decks at Kyle Field in 1979
- portions of the Alaskan pipeline and the Dallas-Fort Worth International Airport
- roads in Peru and Chile
- dams in the United States and Canada, and
- ventured into the Sinai to construct modular housing for peacekeeping troops.

In 2001, he received the Carroll H. Dunn Award of Excellence from the Construction Industry Institute.

He is the namesake of both the Zachry Department of Civil and Environmental Engineering, and the Zachry Engineering Education Complex (the main building for nearly all undergraduate engineering education, both the original 1972 facility and the expanded/renovated 2018 one), at Texas A&M University.

== External Resources ==
Interview with Bartell Zachry, July 29, 1994, University of Texas at San Antonio: Institute of Texan Cultures: Oral History Collections, UA 15.01, University of Texas at San Antonio Libraries Special Collections.
