= Hilton Palacio del Rio =

Hotel in San Antonio, Texas, United States

Coordinates: 29.4224°N 98.4878°W

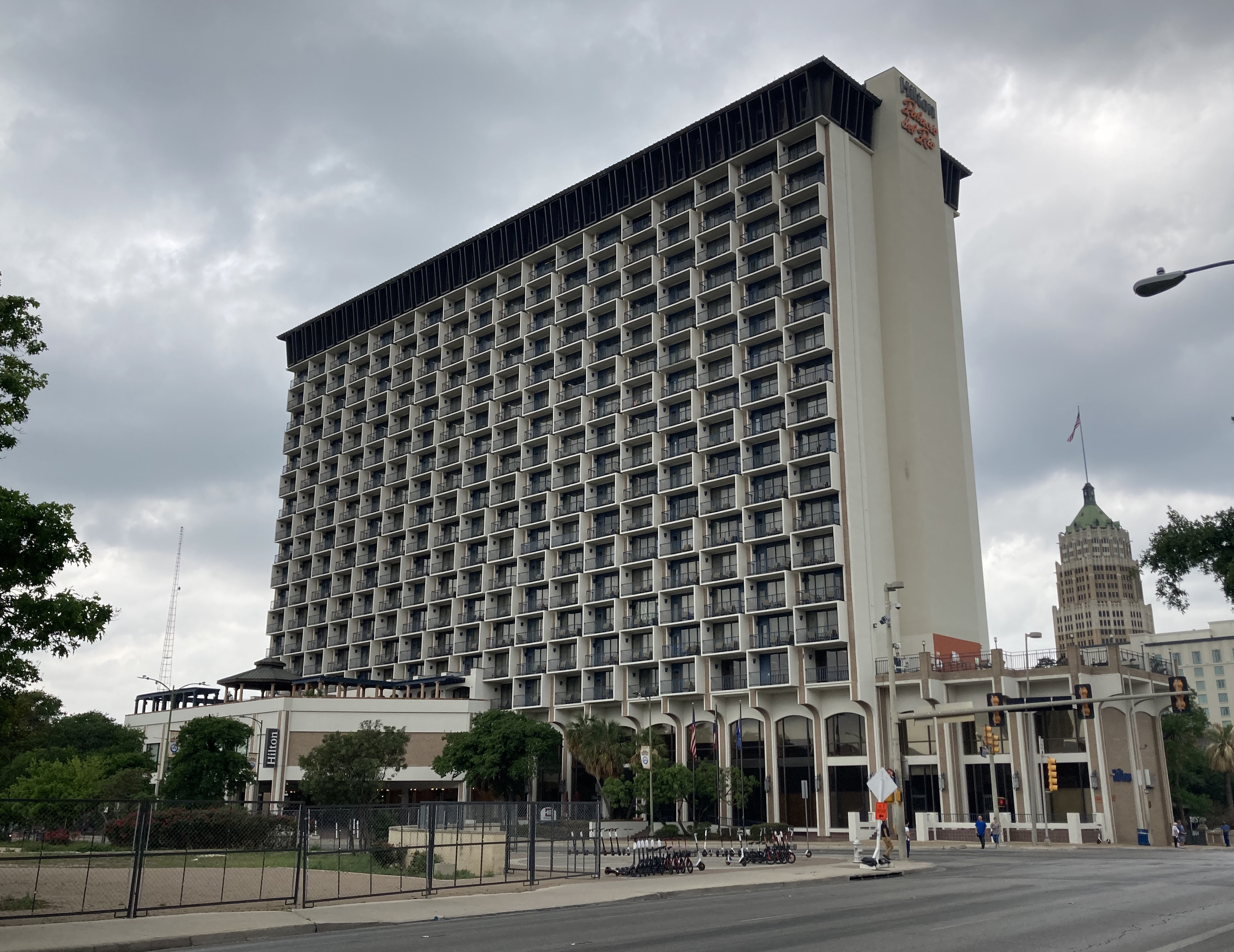
The Hilton Palacio Del Rio Hotel

The Hilton Palacio del Rio is a 485-room, 21-story hacienda-style hotel in San Antonio, Texas that opened in 1968. The hotel was constructed for the 1968 World's Fair, HemisFair '68, and was designed by Cerna & Garza Architects. The structure is notable for being a milestone in the use of Modular building construction techniques.

Traditional construction methods would not allow the hotel to be completed in the short timeframe available before for the opening of the fair on April 6, 1968, so alternative methods were explored. H.B. Zachry Company utilized traditional construction to build the first four floors, slip form construction for the services/elevator core of the building and all guest rooms of the hotel were constructed as modular units in a location seven miles from the construction site. Modular units were built complete with plumbing fixtures, lighting, art work, furnishings and even ash trays. In a nationally televised event, H.B. Zachry and his wife Molly were the first people to check into and "ride" their hotel room, Room No. 522, into the hotel. All rooms were placed in 46 days and the structure was completed in a record 202 working days with crews working around the clock in staggered shifts. The hotel opened 5 days early on April 1, 1968.

The hotel features rich South Texas stylings and original art with the room interiors consisting of five different decor designs executed with custom built furniture by W.R. Dallas Furniture Studio, in San Antonio and rich fabrics in harmony with the overall theme of royal Spanish living.

== External Resources ==
- Construction of the Hilton Palacio del Rio (1967) from Texas Archive of the Moving Image
- Official website
