= Frost Tower (San Antonio) =

Skyscraper in San Antonio, Texas, U.S.

General information
- Status: Completed
- Type: Office
- Location: 111 West Houston Street, San Antonio, Texas, United States
- Coordinates: 29.4269°N 98.4970°W
- Construction started: March 7, 2017
- Completed: 2019

Height
- Roof: 400 ft (120 m)

Technical details
- Floor count: 23

Design and construction
- Architects: Pelli Clarke Pelli Architects, Alamo Architects, Kendall/Heaton Associates Inc.
- Main contractor: Clark Construction

The Frost Tower is a 23-story skyscraper in San Antonio, Texas, United States. It was opened in 2019 at a cost of $142 million and is the first new office tower built in downtown San Antonio since 1989 when Weston Centre was built. Frost Tower replaced City Tower as the headquarters of the eponymously named Frost Bank when it opened in 2019.

In April 2024, the Institute of Texan Cultures (ITC) stated that they would move into Frost Tower in 2025 due to its original building being demolished. Following its one and a half-year modernization works, the new ITC facility was officially opened on the tower's first floor on January 29, 2026. It has a total floor area of 8,000 sq ft (740 m^{2}) and contains two exhibition galleries.

== Reception ==
The building won the 2019 Best Office/Retail/Mixed-Use Project by Engineering News-Record (ENR Texas & Louisiana) and has been compared to Queen Elsa's ice palace, a drill bit, and a can opener.

== See also ==
- List of tallest buildings in San Antonio
