= San Antonio Marriott Riverwalk =

30-story hotel in San Antonio, Texas

Coordinates: 29.4227°N 98.4847°W

The San Antonio Marriott Riverwalk is a 30-story, 350-feet-tall hotel along the San Antonio River Walk in downtown San Antonio, Texas. Constructed in 1979, it is the city's eighth-tallest building and one of its tallest hotels.

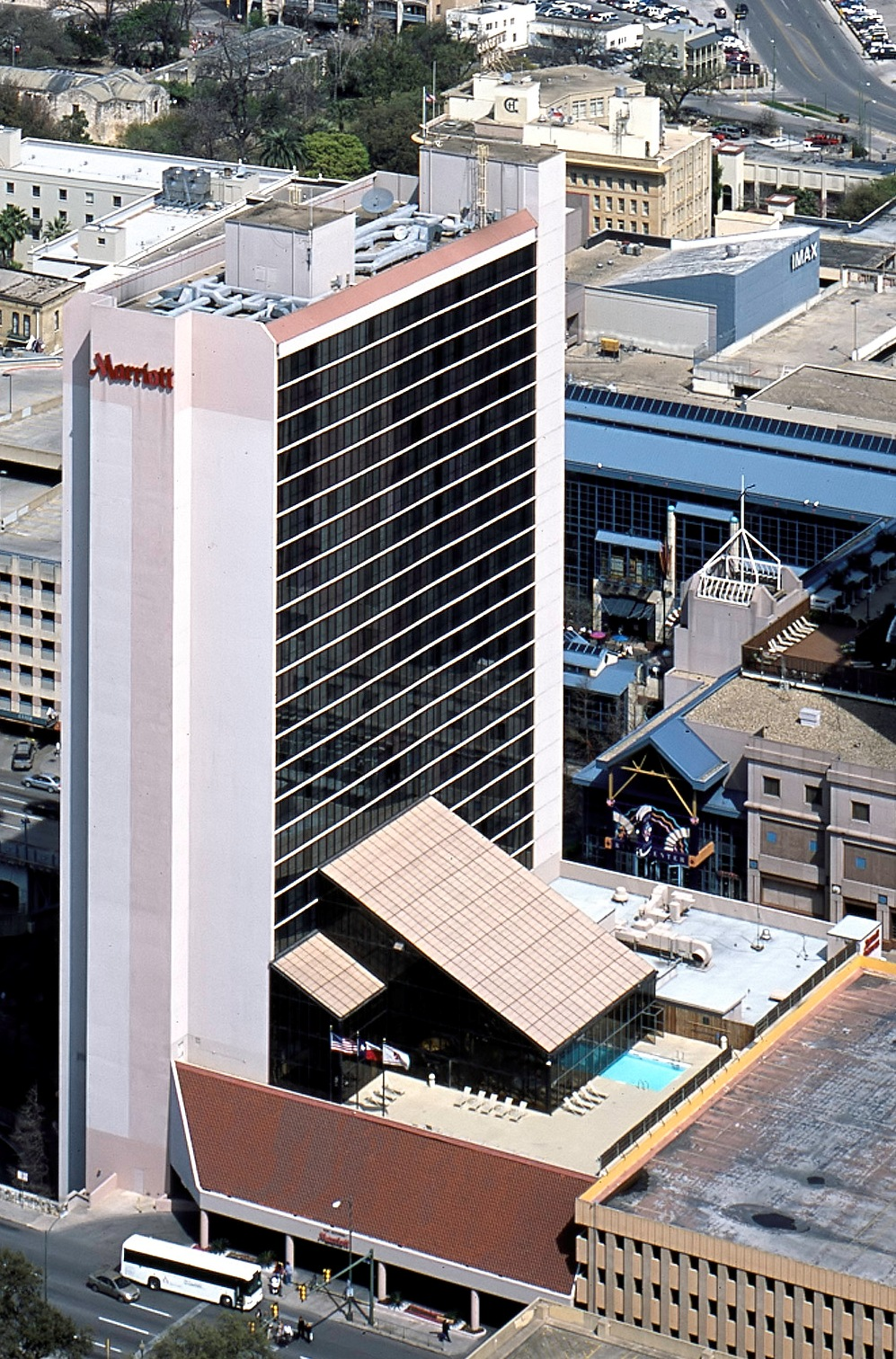
