= Western National Bank =

- Company type: Private
- Industry: Banking; Financial services Investment services through WNB Private Client Services
- Founded: 1977
- Defunct: June 20, 2014
- Fate: Merged
- Successor: Frost Bank
- Headquarters: Midland, Texas, U.S.
- Number of locations: 8 branches
- Area served: Odessa, TX, Midland, TX, San Antonio, TX
- Key people: Clay Wood; (Chairman); Jack Wood; (President & CEO)
- Products: Finance; Consumer banking; Corporate banking; Wealth management; Loans
- Total assets: $1.1 billionUSD (March 31, 2011)
- Total equity: $92.1 million USD
- Owner: WNB Bancshares, Inc.
- Number of employees: 170 (2014)

Western National Bank (WNB) was an American bank that was chartered in 1977 and operated in Odessa, Texas. It was acquired by Frost Bank in 2014 and all the branches were rebranded as Frost Bank or closed after the merger.

== History ==
Western National Bank was chartered in 1977 in Texas. Among the charter members were the Wood family. During the great oil bust of the 1980s, the Wood family saw the need for money to be invested in the bank and bought out the other investors. Western National Bank was one of the few banks that was established during that time and operated under the same name until it merged with Frost Bank.

On June 20, 2014, Western National Bank was absorbed by Frost Bank. All seven Midland/Odessa branches became Frost Bank offices, and the San Antonio Western National Bank branch was closed.
