= Frost Bank =

American banking and financial services company

Cullen/Frost Bankers, Inc.

- Headquarters at Frost Tower
- Type: Public
- Traded as: NYSE: CFR; TXSE: CFR; S&P 400 component; Russell 1000 Index component
- Industry: Banking
- Founded: 1868; 158 years ago
- Founder: Thomas Claiborne Frost
- Headquarters: Frost Tower, San Antonio, Texas, United States
- Key people: Phil Green (chairman & CEO); Paul Bracher (president); Dan Geddes (CFO)
- Net income: ▲US$648.6 million (2025)
- Total assets: ▲US$53.041 billion (2025)
- Total equity: ▲US$4.573 billion (2025)
- Number of employees: 6,008 (2025)
- Website: www.frostbank.com

Frost Bank is an American bank based in San Antonio and chartered in Texas, with 206 branches and 1,750 automated teller machines (ATM) in the state. It is the primary subsidiary of Cullen/Frost Bankers, Inc.. Frost is one of the 60 largest banks in the United States, with total assets under management of over US$53 billion. As of 2025, the bank has the largest ATM network in Texas. Frost is included on the S&P 400 index.

== History ==
=== 1868-1928: Early growth ===
Frost Bank was founded in 1868 as a mercantile partnership in San Antonio by Thomas Claiborne Frost, who had served as a lieutenant colonel in the Confederate States Army. In February 1899, it was chartered as a national banking association. That year, the bank also reached $1 million in deposits (worth about $39 million in 2026 dollars). The bank survived the Panic of 1907 with the aid of an association of local banks and by 1921, sold shares to outside investors for the first time. Frost continued to grow with the construction of a 12-story building in 1921, which was one of the tallest buildings in Texas at the time. By 1926, Joseph Hardin Frost, brother of T.C. Frost Jr., took over as president of the company.

=== 1928-2008: Acquisitions ===
Frost began acquiring other banks, beginning in 1928 with the purchase of Lockwood National Bank. In 1975, the bank moved into its first headquarters in City Tower in downtown San Antonio. Two years later, in 1977, the company merged with Cullen Bankers, Inc. of Houston. Cullen/Frost Bankers, Inc. was formed, and its stock began trading on the NASDAQ.

In 1982, Cullen/Frost Bankers and United States National Bancshares, Inc. (USNB) of Galveston, Texas merged, but Frost operated USNB separately for nearly two decades. As new financial services legislation allowed banks to broaden the services they offered customers, Cullen/Frost folded the USNB charter into Frost's in 2000. With this action, the last bank using the federally forbidden United States National Bank title ceased to exist.

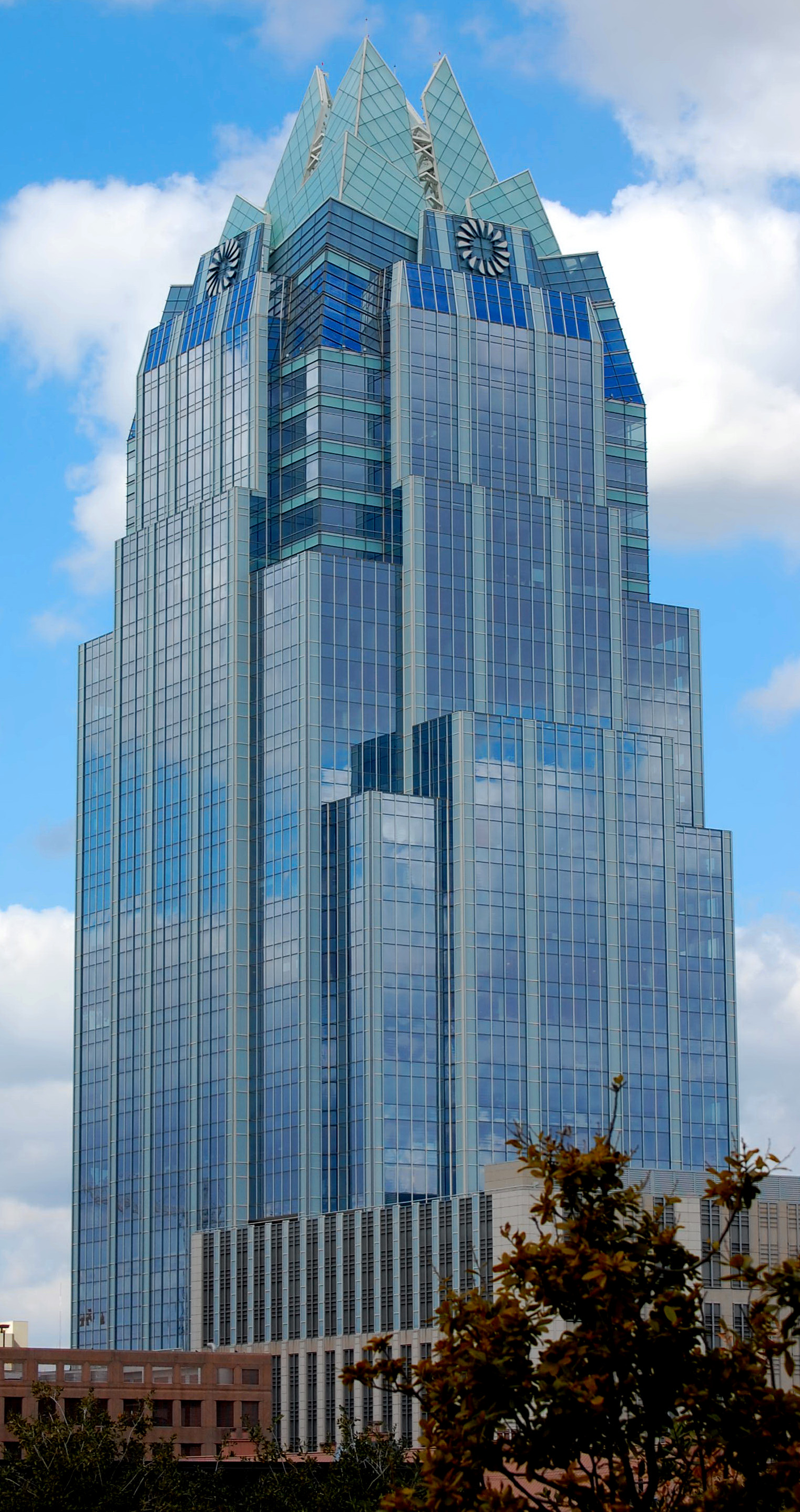
The Frost Bank Tower is one of the tallest buildings in Austin, Texas.

Frost announced it intended to merge with First City Bancorp in 1983. The merger was never completed, and First City was subsequently rescued by the Federal Deposit Insurance Corporation (FDIC) in 1988 and ultimately declared bankruptcy in 1992.

In 1999, Frost Bank acquired Commerce Financial Corp. and Frost Insurance Agency, a subsidiary of the bank acquired Professional Insurance Agents Inc. Between 2005 and 2006, the company acquired Alamo Bank of Texas, Horizon Capital Bank, Summit Bancshares Inc., and Texas Community Bank.

In late 2001, construction began on the Frost Bank Tower in downtown Austin, Texas. It was the first high-rise building to be constructed in the United States after the 9/11 attacks. Completed in 2003 for US$137 million, the building contains the Austin offices of Frost Bank, Morgan Stanley, Ernst & Young, PIMCO, UTIMCO, and Heritage Title Co.

=== 2008-2014: Financial crisis and aftermath ===
A Frost Bank branch in San Marcos, TX

During the 2008 financial crisis, Frost did not accept government assistance via the Troubled Asset Relief Program (TARP). In a press release, the bank stated that it was capitalized "now and for the foreseeable future with sufficient capital to grow our business and take advantage of acquisition opportunities."

Frost invested in technology as many similar banks were forced to cut back on investment in infrastructure. The bank converted its 113-year-old federal charter into a state charter in June 2012.

=== 2014-present: Continued growth ===
In 2014, Frost acquired Western National Bank. The following year, Frost moved their headquarters from City Tower to Frost Tower (remains their current headquarters). The city of San Antonio purchased City Tower from Frost for US$52.9 million.

In 2021, US$1 million was stolen from Frost's ATM network over a period of two months. According to federal documents from the indictment, the targeted ATMs allegedly had an "internal flaw allowing an individual to withdraw cash in such a way that the withdrawal did not register with the machine, and, therefore, did not result in the debiting of funds from the associated account." Nine defendants were named in the indictment, and were charged with bank fraud, conspiracy to commit bank fraud, and identity theft by a grand jury. Two defendants pled guilty, six pled not guilty, and one, as of 2025, has not yet been arrested. A Frost spokesperson stated that Frost had "implemented measures to prevent any future similar fraud."

In November 2026, Frost Bank's parent company, Cullen/Frost Bankers, Inc., moved its primary stock listings to the newly-formed Texas Stock Exchange (TXSE) in Dallas. The bank was the first company to ring the opening bell for TXSE.

== Sponsorships ==
Spurs coach Mitch Johnson in a pre-game interview, sponsored by Frost.

=== San Antonio Spurs ===
In 1973, the then-Dallas Chaparrals missed the playoffs for the first time in their existence in the 1972–73 season, primarily due to financial troubles. After the season, the owners decided to sell the basketball team to either San Antonio or El Paso. Thirty-five San Antonio businessmen, including Frost Bank's then-president and CEO Tom C. Frost, worked out a "lend-lease" deal with the Dallas ownership group. Frost provided the financing necessary to transition the Spurs from Dallas to San Antonio.

For the next 45 years, Frost Bank maintained a partnership with the Spurs as the team's bank. In 2018, the Spurs and Frost Bank jointly announced that beginning in the 2018-19 season, Frost would be the first-ever jersey partner of the team.

=== Frost Bank Center ===
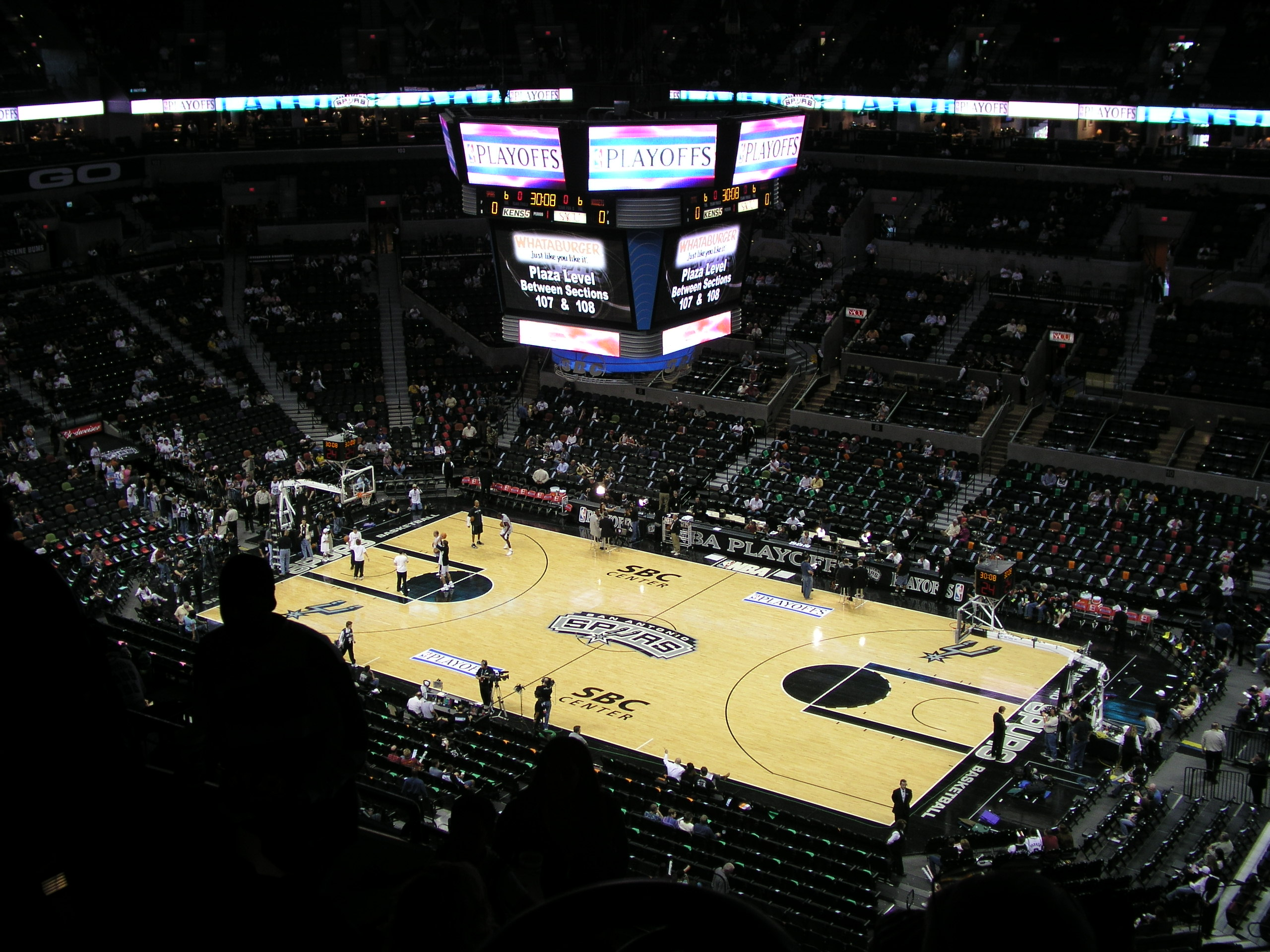
Inside the Frost Bank Center.

On July 2, 2021, it was announced that AT&T would not be renewing its contract for naming rights to the arena, then known as the AT&T Center. The arena is the home of the San Antonio Spurs. Two years later, on August 3, 2023, it was announced that Frost would be the arena sponsor and earn naming rights to the building.

The arena has hosted numerous events. They hosted the 2003, 2005, 2007, 2013, 2014, and 2026 NBA Finals. The Spurs won the 2003, 2005 and 2014 championships at the arena. In 2026, the New York Knicks became the first visiting team to win the championship at Frost Bank Center. The arena has hosted various WWE and UFC events, including Saturday Night's Main Event in January 2025 and episodes of WWE Raw and WWE SmackDown. In November 2016, Black Sabbath played their final United States show at the Frost Bank Center.

== See also ==
- List of largest banks in the United States
- List of S&P 400 companies
- Texas Stock Exchange
