= Weston Centre (San Antonio) =

Skyscraper in San Antonio, Texas, U.S.

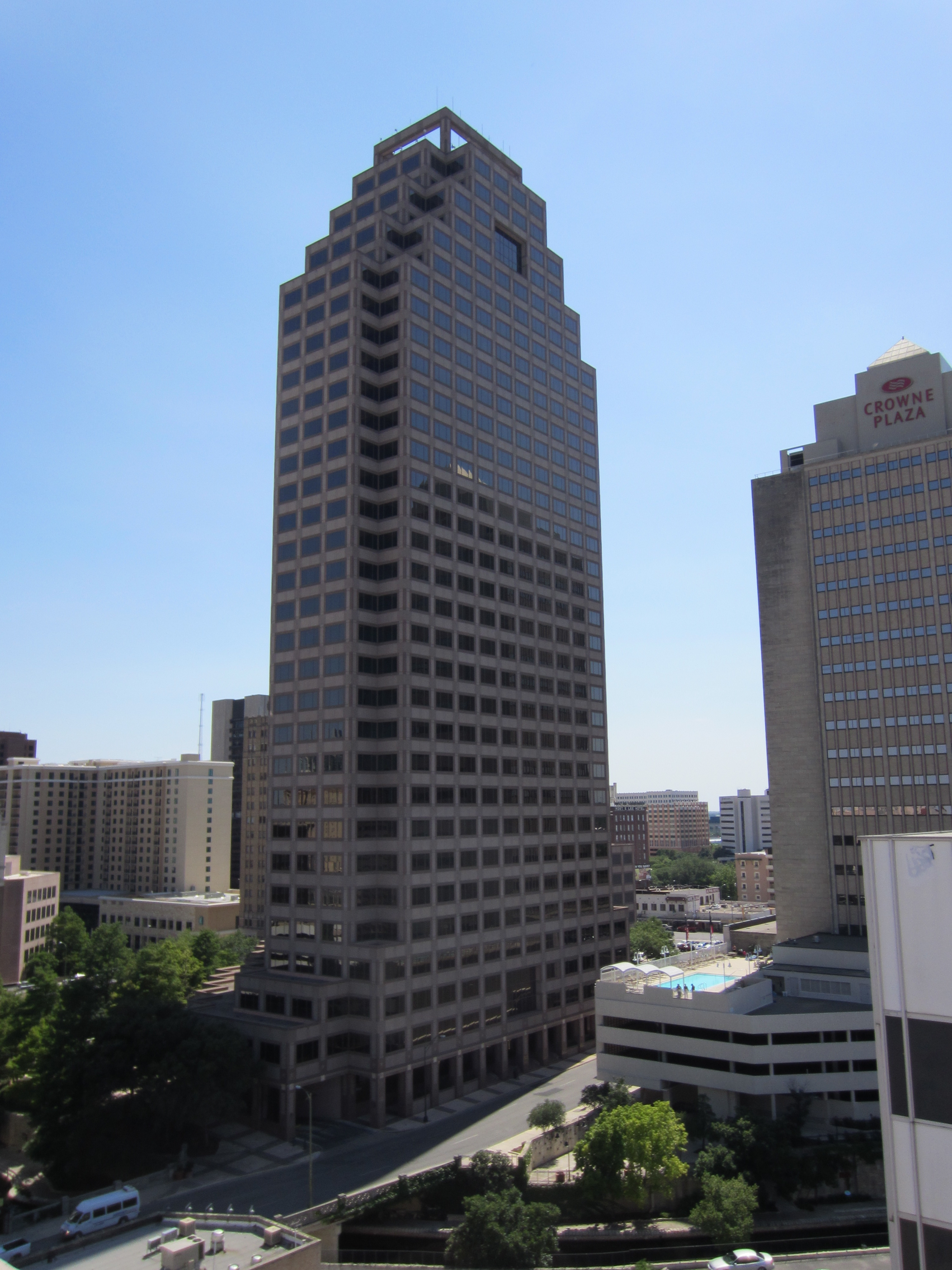

General information
- Status: Completed
- Type: Office
- Location: 112 East Pecan St., San Antonio, Texas, United States
- Coordinates: 29°25′43″N 98°29′32″W
- Construction started: 1987; 39 years ago
- Completed: 1988; 38 years ago
- Opening: 1989; 37 years ago

Height
- Roof: 444 ft (135 m)

Technical details
- Floor count: 32
- Floor area: 500,360 sq ft (46,485 m^{2})

Design and construction
- Architects: Cambridge Seven Associates, Inc., Lloyd Jones Fillpot & Associates
- Main contractor: W.S. Bellows Construction Corp.

The Weston Centre is a 32-story modern-styled skyscraper in Downtown San Antonio, Texas, United States. Standing at a structural height of 444 feet (135 m), it is the third tallest skyscraper in San Antonio and the city's tallest office building.

== History ==
The building was originally called NBC Bank Plaza, and is faced with precast concrete containing Texas granite and limestone. The city's riverwalk passes directly to the east of the building. The building and adjacent garages were completed at a cost of $80.9 million, at the time the most expensive commercial project San Antonio had ever seen.
