= Downtown San Antonio =

- District of San Antonio
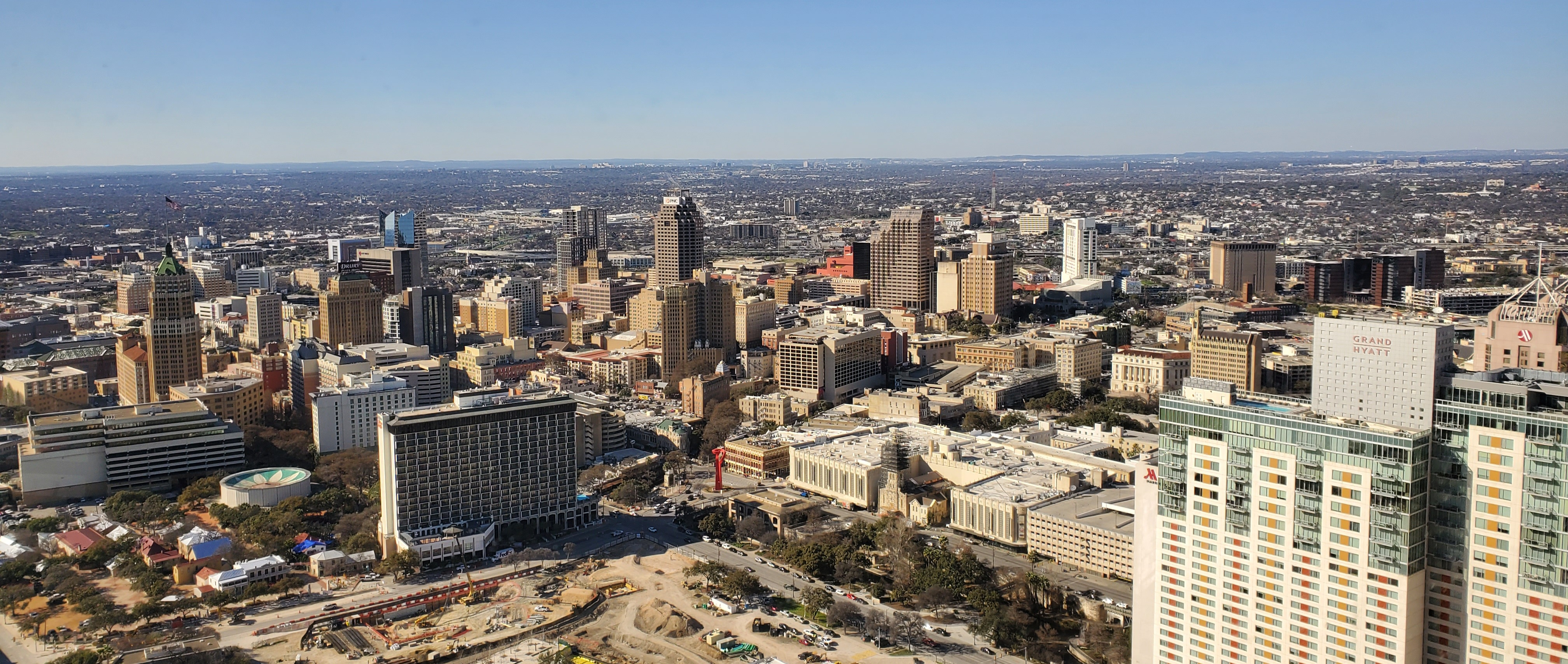
- Downtown San Antonio view from the Tower of the Americas in 2023

- The Downtown Brand Mark, launched in 2016, visually represents the interconnected nature of the neighborhoods, people, cultures, and lifestyles that make up the fabric of downtown.
- Interactive map of Downtown San Antonio
- Coordinates: 29°25′33″N 98°29′23″W

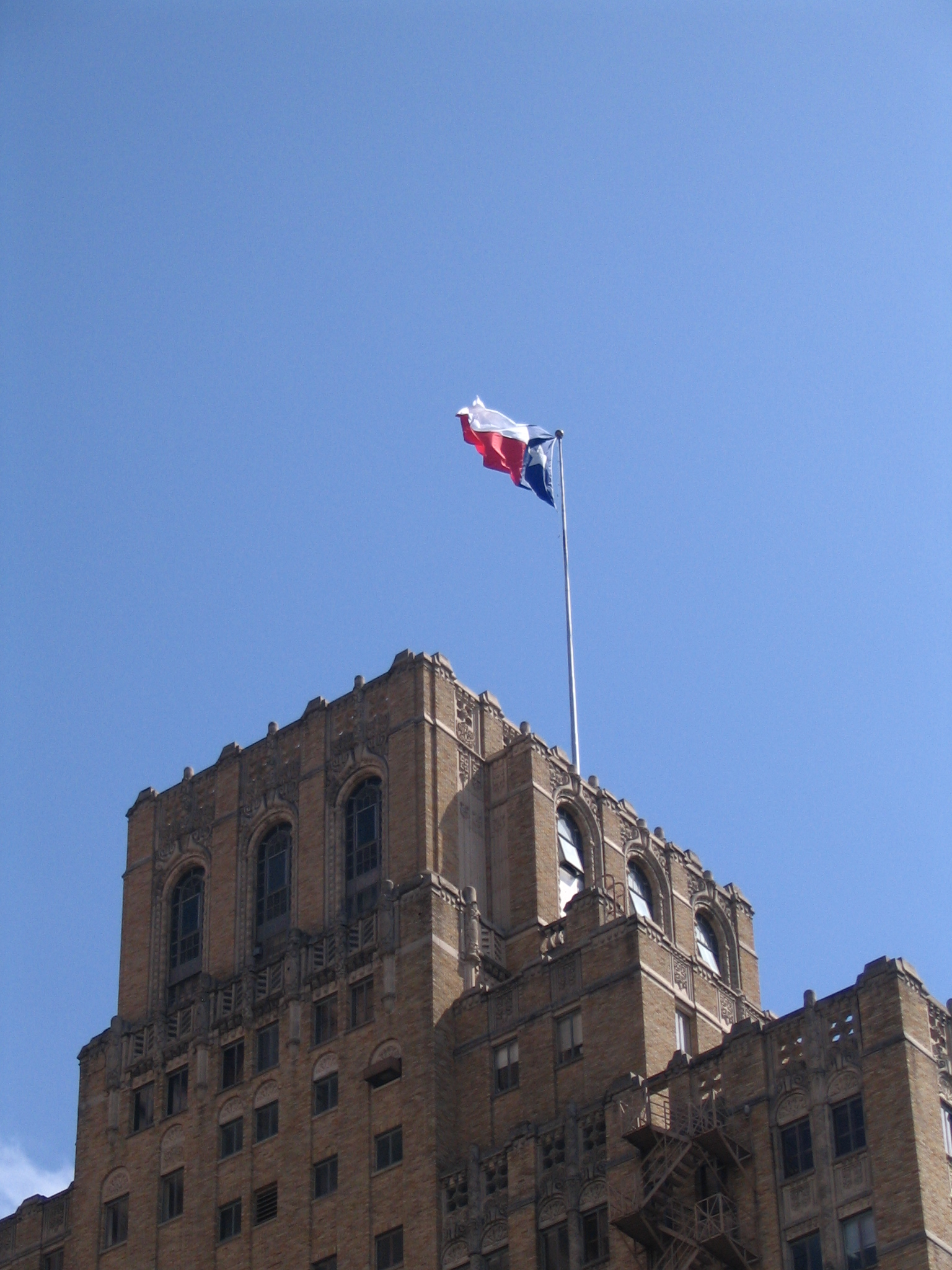
Texas Flag in San Antonio

Downtown San Antonio is the central business district of San Antonio, Texas, and the urban core of Greater San Antonio, a metropolitan area with nearly 2.5 million people.

Downtown San Antonio is encircled by 1604 and I-410 loops and three interstate freeways: I-35, I-37, and I-10. Together, the three highways create a rectangular route around the city's urban core: I-35 to the north and west, I-37 to the east, and I-10 to the south. The rectangular loop has a 9-mile (14 km) circumference and is known as the "Downtown Loop" or "Central Loop", which encompasses both it and Southtown.

== Districts ==
Downtown is home to many districts including the Alamo District, Alamodome District, Arsenal, Central Business District, Convention Center District, Historic Civic District, Houston Street District, Lavaca District, La Villita District, Market Square District, North Downtown, River North District, Zona cultural, San Antonio CO-OP district, River Bend District, King William Historic District, South Flores Warehouse District, SoSo (South of Southtown), Southtown Arts District, Eastbourough, and the University District. The northwestern corner of Downtown is the Medical District.

The Central Business District is home to the Rivercenter, anchored by a Macy's, an IMAX theater, an H&M, and formerly Dillard's. The five-level Art Deco Dillard's, at the corner of Alamo and Commerce streets, opened in 1887 as Joske's. Joske's flagship store was 551,000 square feet (51,200 m^{2}) in floor space until Dillard's bought the Joske's chain in 1987. In August 2008, Dillard's moved out of the historic building as a part of a redevelopment plan for Rivercenter Mall. The Rivercenter Mall was built around St. Joseph Catholic Church after the church refused to move.

Many people travel to visit the Alamo Plaza Historic District, which houses the famous Alamo. Attractions such as the river walk are home to many of the festivities throughout the year including NIOSA A Night in Old San Antonio which celebrates Fiesta, Cinco de Mayo, and numerous parades such as celebrations for their home NBA team the Spurs, Christmas parades and much more.

In the southeastern part of Downtown is the Alamodome, a 65,000-seat arena that hosts many types of events, primarily conventions and football games.

While many companies based in San Antonio are based in other parts of the city, particularly the Northwest Side and Uptown, there are companies based in Downtown San Antonio, such as H-E-B, Eye Care Centers of America, Bromley Originate Change, and Kell Muñoz Architects.

== Government and infrastructure ==
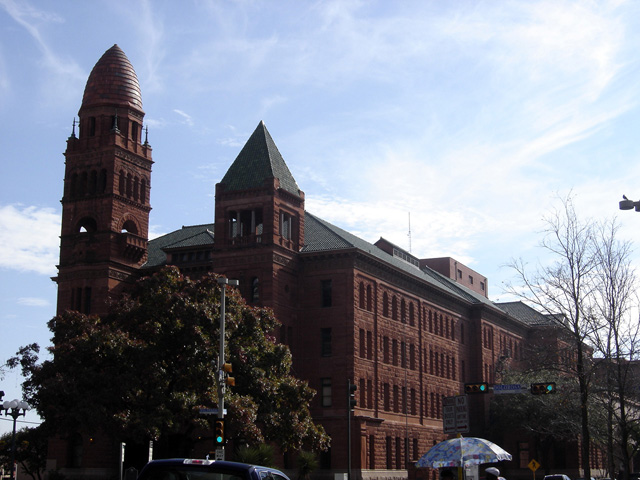
Bexar County Courthouse

The San Antonio Police Department (SAPD) serves Downtown from the Central Substation. The main SAPD headquarters are in Downtown.

The San Antonio Fire Department (SAFD), the city's fire protection and EMS service, is also based in Downtown.

The Texas Fourth Court of Appeals is located in the Cadena-Reeves Justice Center in Downtown San Antonio.

The San Antonio Post Office and Courthouse, located at 615 East Houston Street, functions as a United States Postal Service post office and as a regional office for federal agencies. In 2009, $61 million were allocated to renovate the Post Office and Courthouse as a part of federal stimulus spending. The six story, neoclassical, Beaux-Arts building opened in 1937.

== Diplomatic missions ==
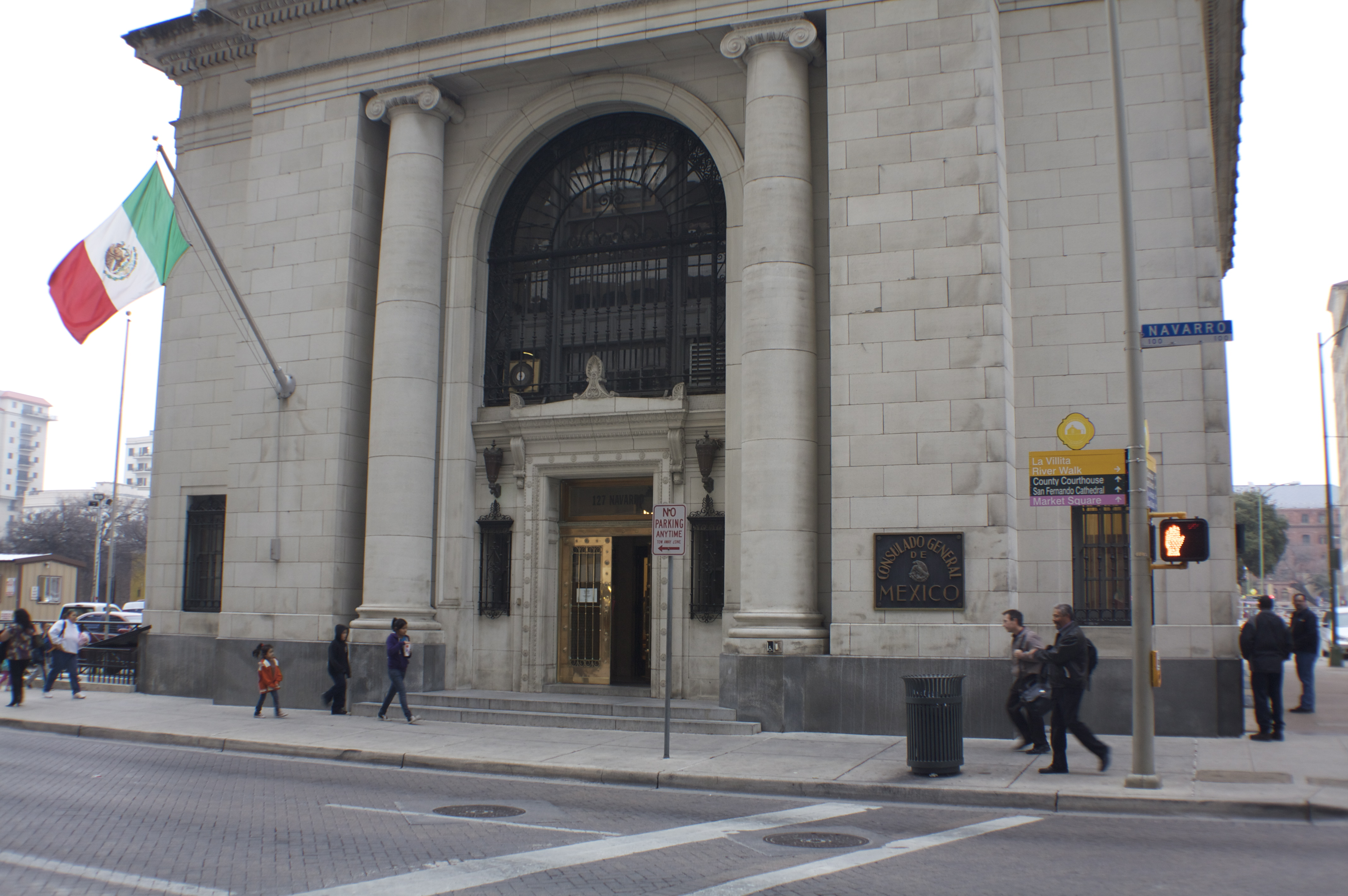
Consulate-General of Mexico in San Antonio

The Consulate-General of Mexico in San Antonio is located at 127 Navarro Street in Downtown.

== Transportation ==
Greyhound Lines operates the San Antonio Station at 500 North St. Marys Street.

VIA Metropolitan Transit operates an Information Center at 211 W. Commerce Street, its Main Executive Office, called The Grand, at 123 N. Medina Street, Ellis Alley Park & Ride, and Centro Plaza, the company's main transit facility, which is located across from the Grand. Both Centro Plaza and the Grand are located in the Cattleman Square District of Downtown.

Amtrak operates a train station in St. Paul's Square.

Since Downtown is located at the City's geographical center, Interstate Highways 10, 35, and 37 combine to form a Downtown Circulator, which completely surrounds Downtown San Antonio. IH35 borders Downtown S.A. to the north and west, IH10 to the south and west (overlaps with IH35), and IH37 along the east end.

== Education ==
=== Primary and secondary schools ===
Downtown is within the San Antonio Independent School District, which is headquartered in there.

Austin Academy, a PreK-8 school, is northwest of Downtown and serves parts of northern Downtown. Bonham Elementary School, an elementary school which will become PreK-8 by 2009, is south of Downtown and serves southern Downtown. Bowden Elementary School, east of Downtown, serves parts of northern Downtown.

Middle schools serving sections of Downtown include Tafolla, Twain, and Wheatley.

Northern Downtown is in the attendance zone of Fox Tech High School in Downtown, while southern parts are zoned to Brackenridge High School, south of Downtown. Navarro High School, a magnet school, is adjacent to Downtown.

=== Colleges and universities ===
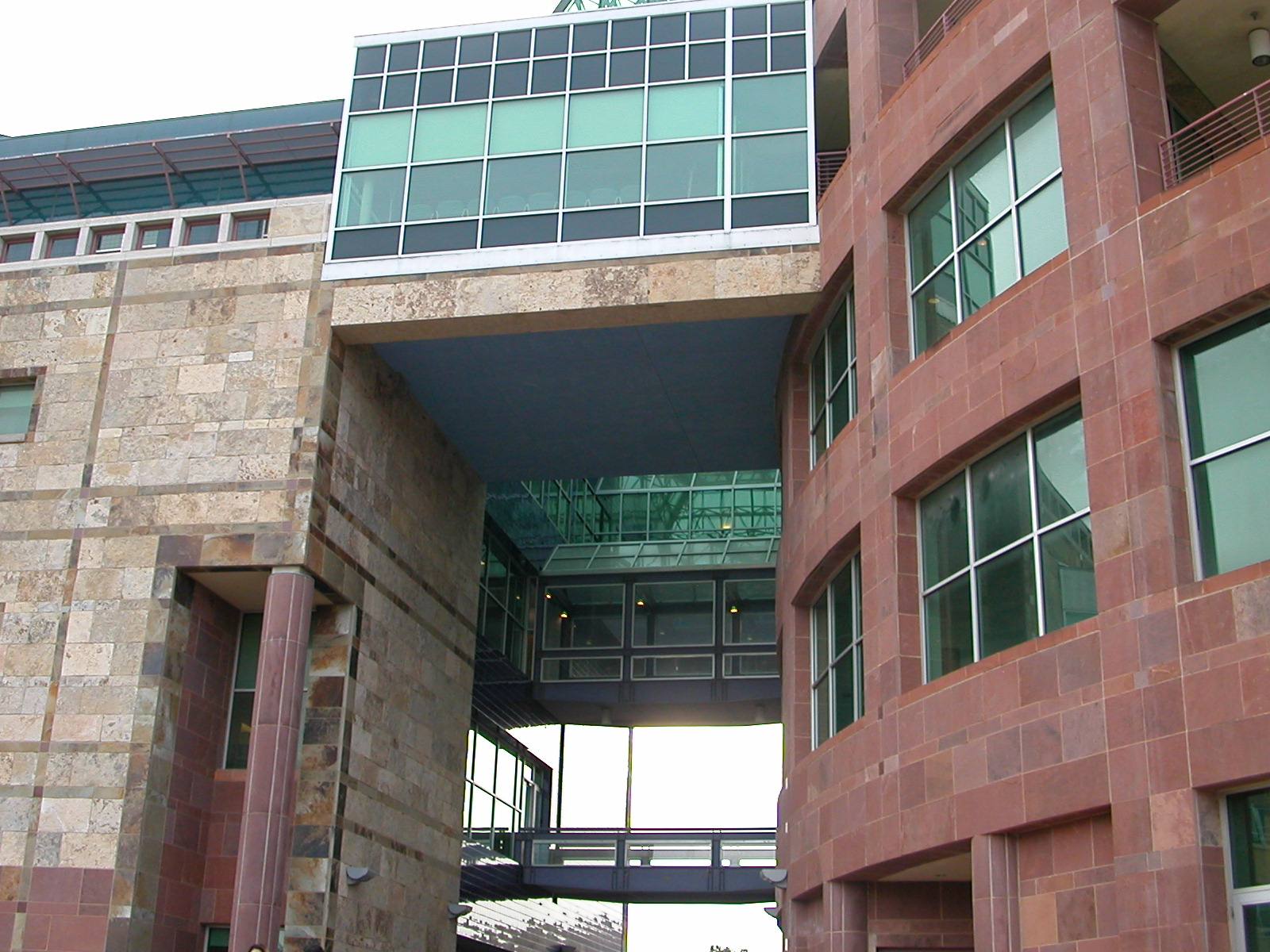
University of Texas at San Antonio's downtown campus

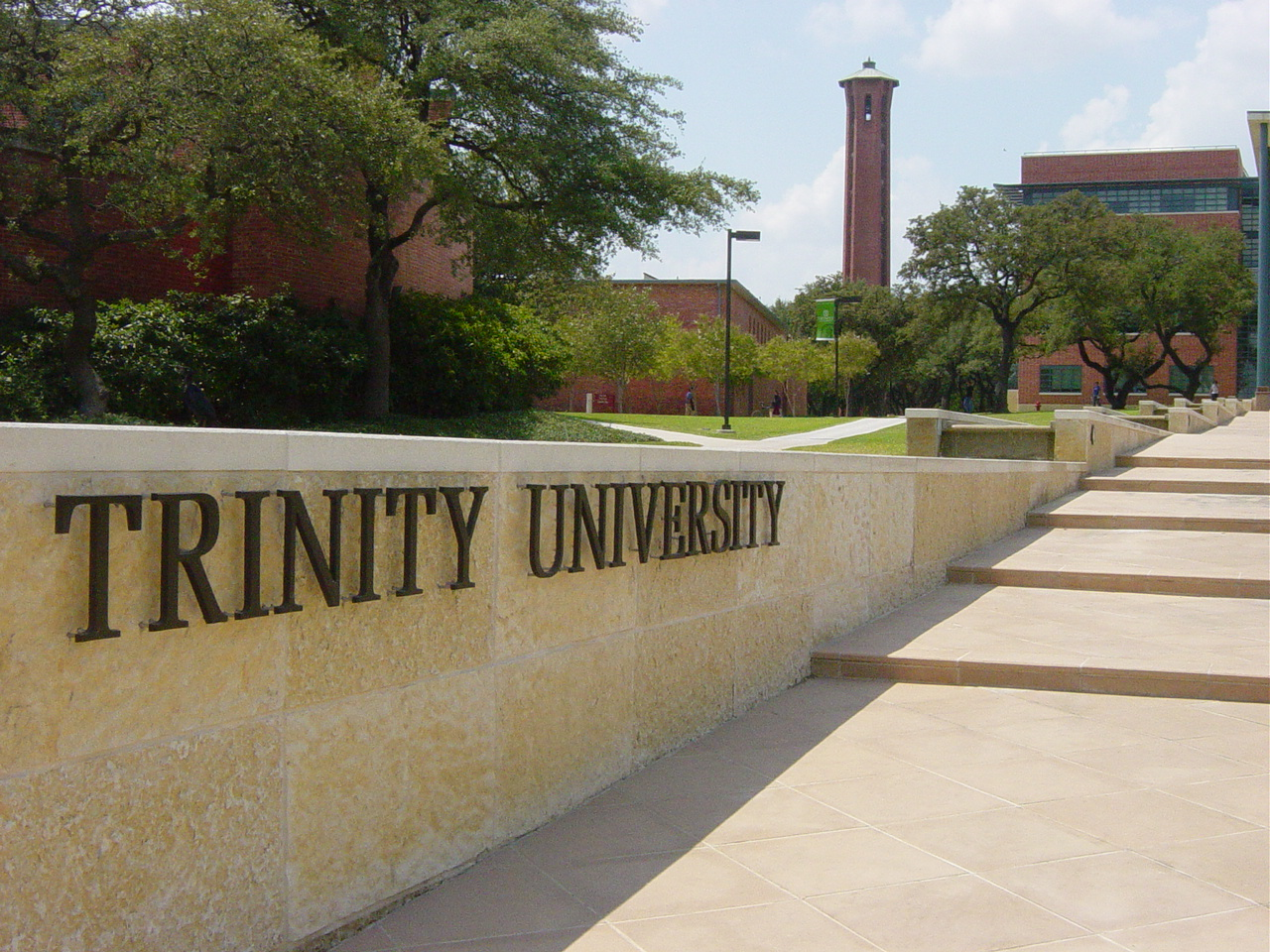
The main entrance to Trinity University. Also pictured are the iconic Murchison Tower and Northrup Hall.

The University of Texas at San Antonio has both its Downtown and HemisFair Park campuses in the downtown area.

Trinity University is a private, primarily undergraduate, liberal arts college in midtown San Antonio, approximately five miles due north of downtown.

=== Public libraries ===
The six-story Central Library, a branch of the San Antonio Public Library (SAPL) system, is located at 600 Soledad Street. SAPL also operates a library portal located at the Briscoe Western Art Museum on Market Street. BiblioTech digital public library has a satellite branch at the Bexar County Courthouse in the Central Jury Room.

== Attractions ==
The Alamo Mission in San Antonio ("the Alamo"), located in Downtown, is Texas' top tourist attraction. Because of the mission, San Antonio is often called the "Alamo City".

The River Walk, which meanders through the Downtown area, is the city's second-most-visited attraction. It was one of the first restorations of an urban river. Lined with numerous shops, bars, and restaurants, as well as the Arneson River Theater, this attraction is transformed into an impressive festival of lights during the Christmas and New Year holiday period, and is suffused with the local sounds of folklorico and flamenco music during the summer, particularly during celebrations such as the Fiesta Noche del Rio. Also based along the River Walk is the newly restored Aztec On The River, the only surviving exotic-themed movie palace in Texas.

The Downtown Area also features Cathedral of San Fernando, The Majestic Theatre, HemisFair Park (home of the Tower of the Americas, and UTSA's Institute of Texan Cultures), Pearl, La Villita, Market Square, the Spanish Governor's Palace, and the historic Menger Hotel. On the northern side of the Alamo complex, beside the Emily Morgan Hotel, is the San Antonio Cavalry Museum, which features cavalry artifacts and exhibits and is frequented by local re-enactors.

The Fairmount Hotel, built in 1906 and San Antonio's second oldest hotel, is in the Guinness World Records as one of the heaviest buildings ever moved intact. It was placed in its new location, three blocks south of the Alamo, over four days in 1985, and cost $650,000 to move. Not far from the city center there are many local theaters, such as the Overtime Theatre.

Downtown San Antonio is seeing an uptick of outdoor tourism attractions. With the opening of the Mission Reach section of the River Walk, new recreational tourism businesses such as Mission Bike Tour and Mission Kayak opened up to give tourists a new visiting experience. Visitors can now do activities such as kayaking the San Antonio River and bicycling to the World Heritage Missions.

== Gallery ==
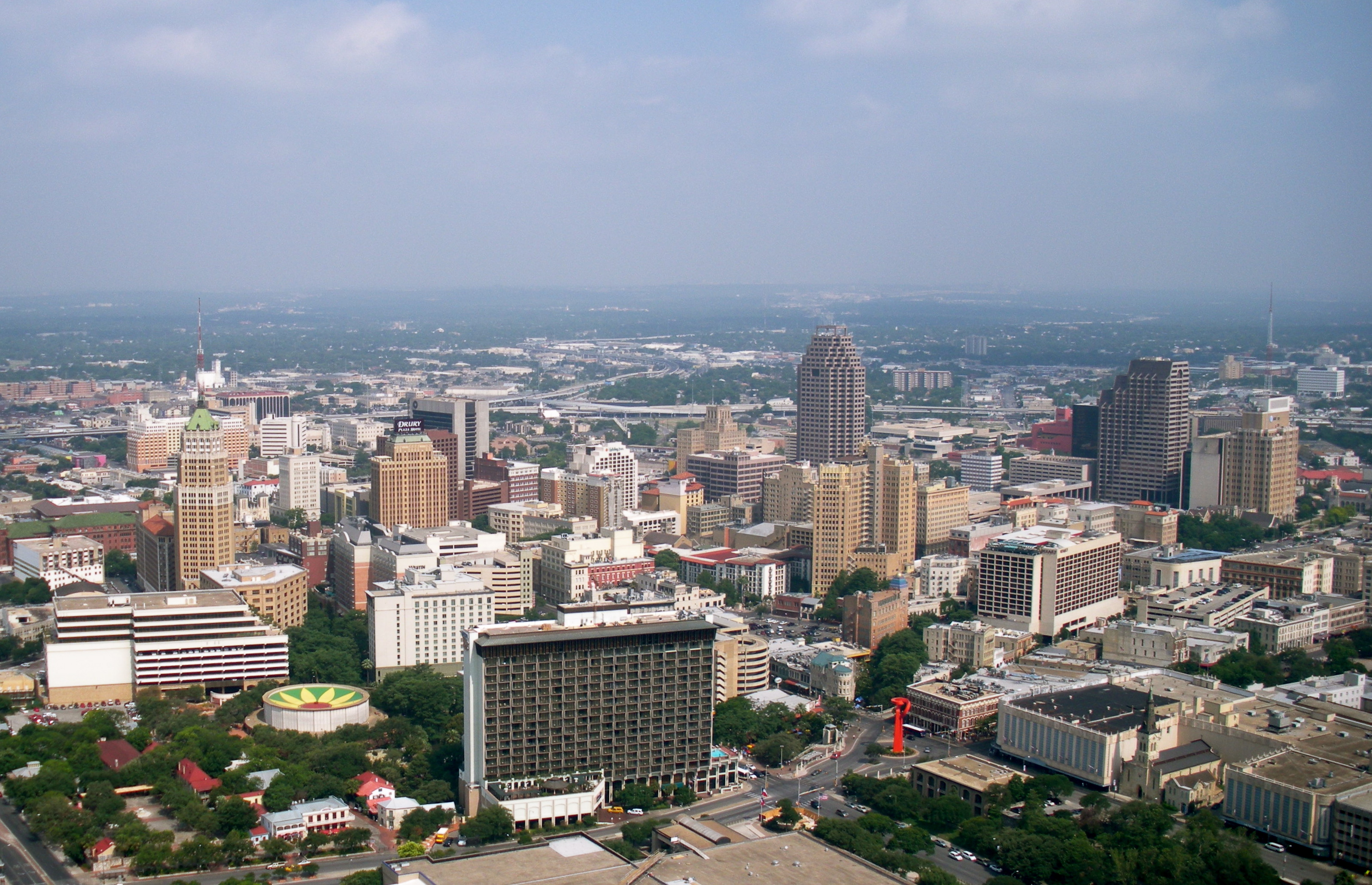
Downtown San Antonio view from the Tower of the Americas around 2002.

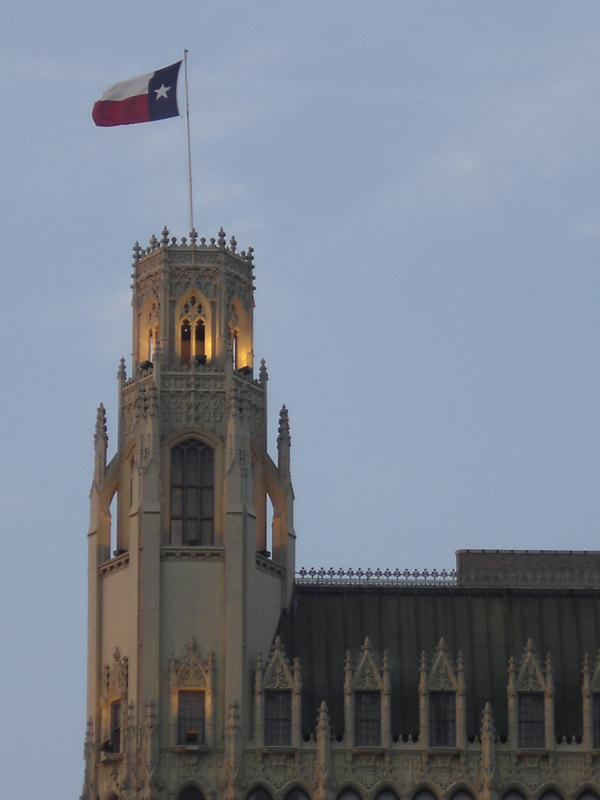
The Emily Morgan Hotel, one of the city's earliest highrises.

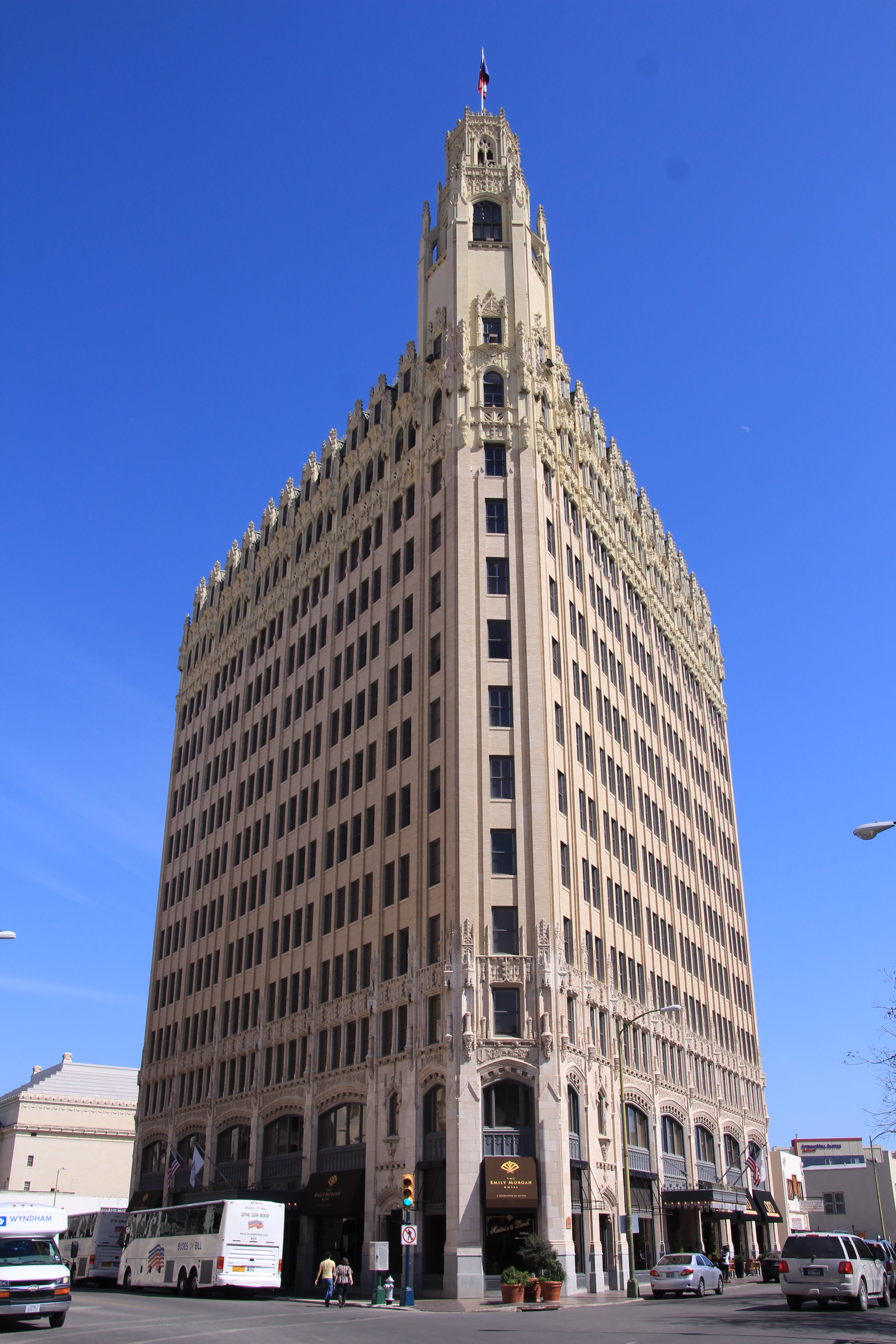
The Emily Morgan Hotel, as seen from the street.

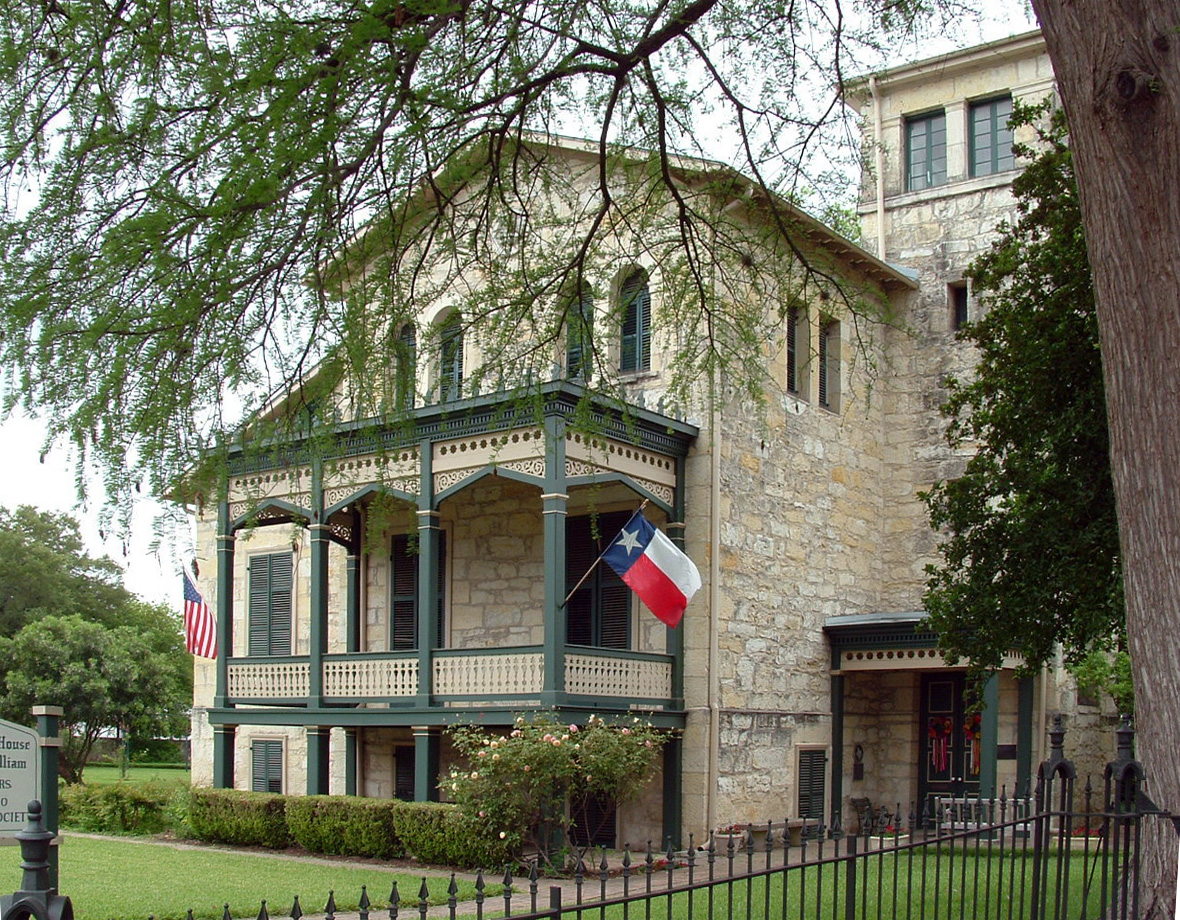
The Anton Wulff House, King William District.

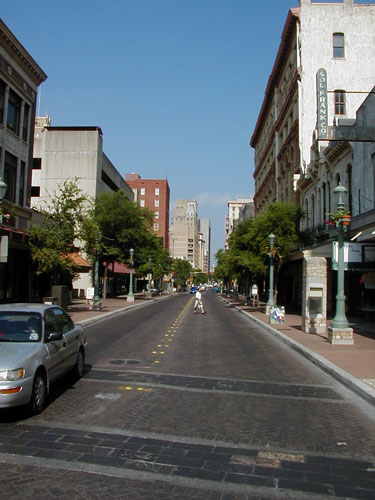
Houston Street

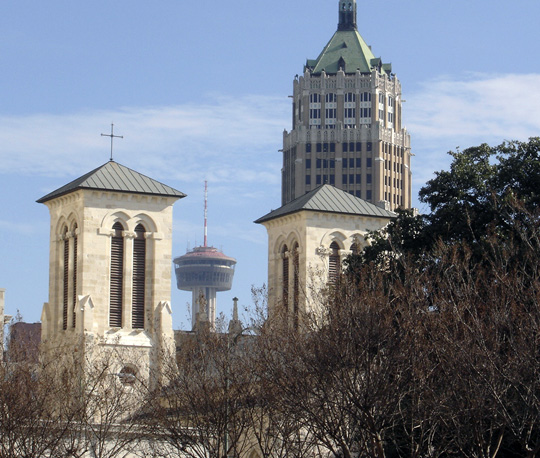
The Cathedral of San Fernando, the Tower Life Building, and the Tower of the Americas.

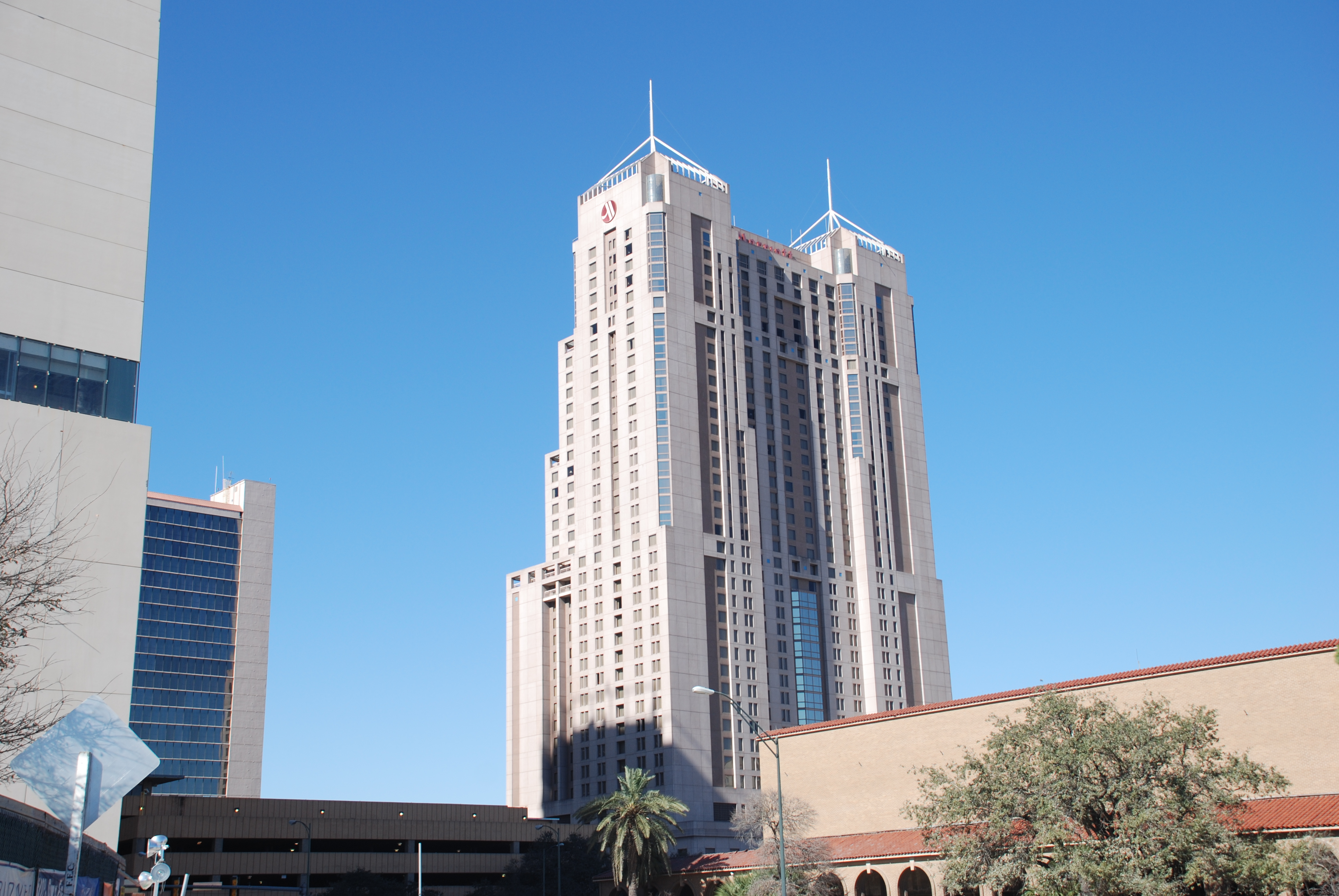
Marriott Rivercenter

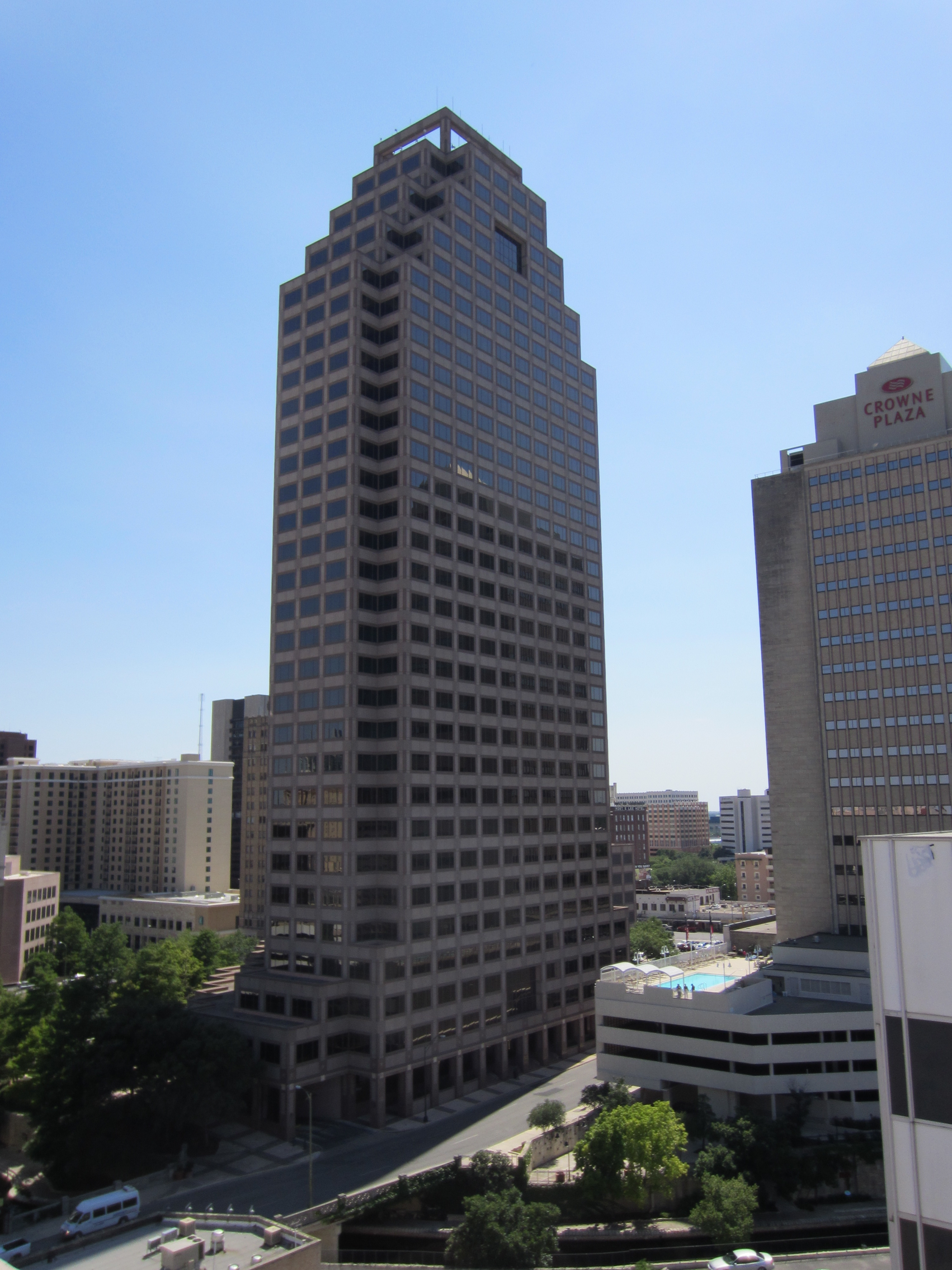
Weston Centre

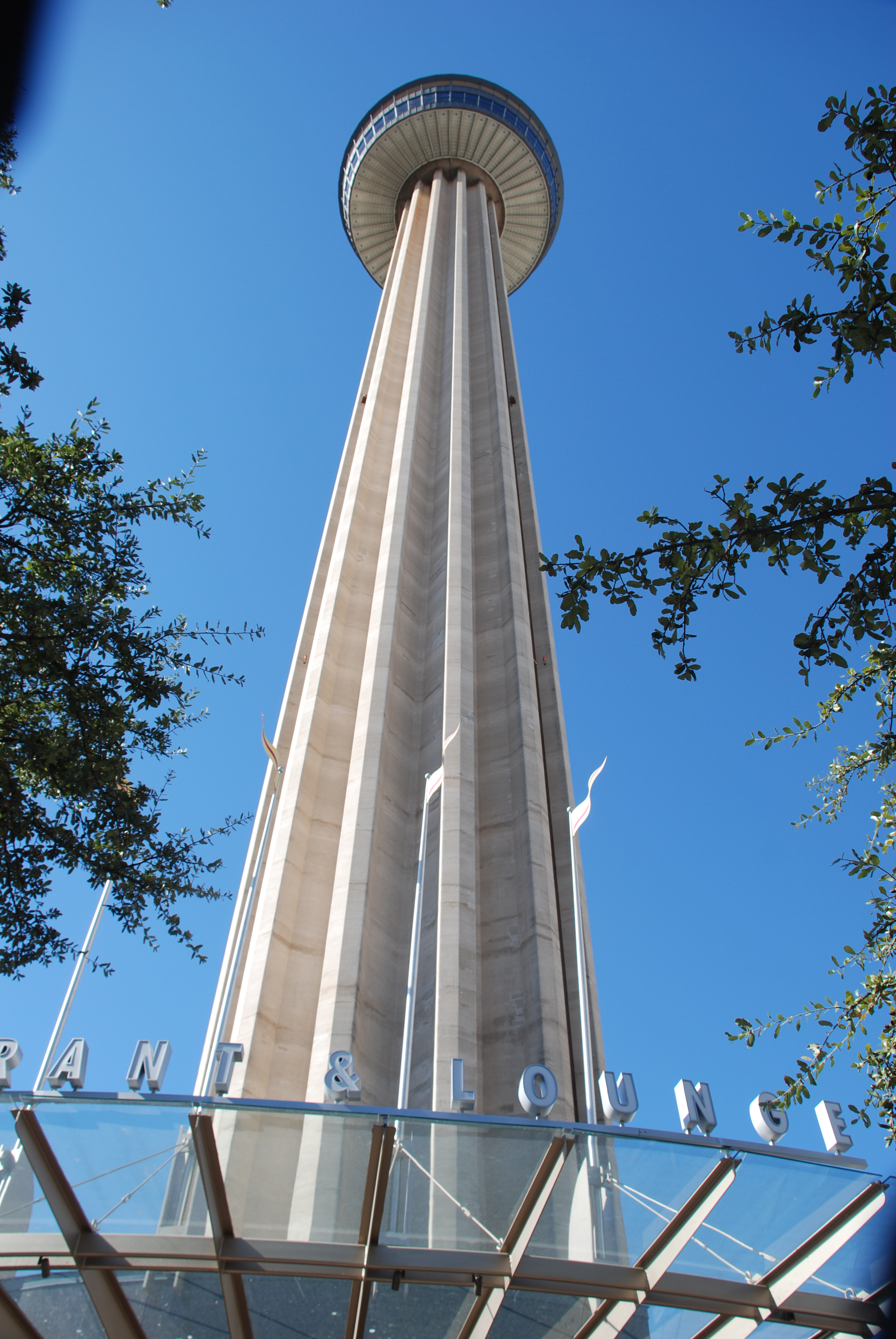
Tower of the Americas

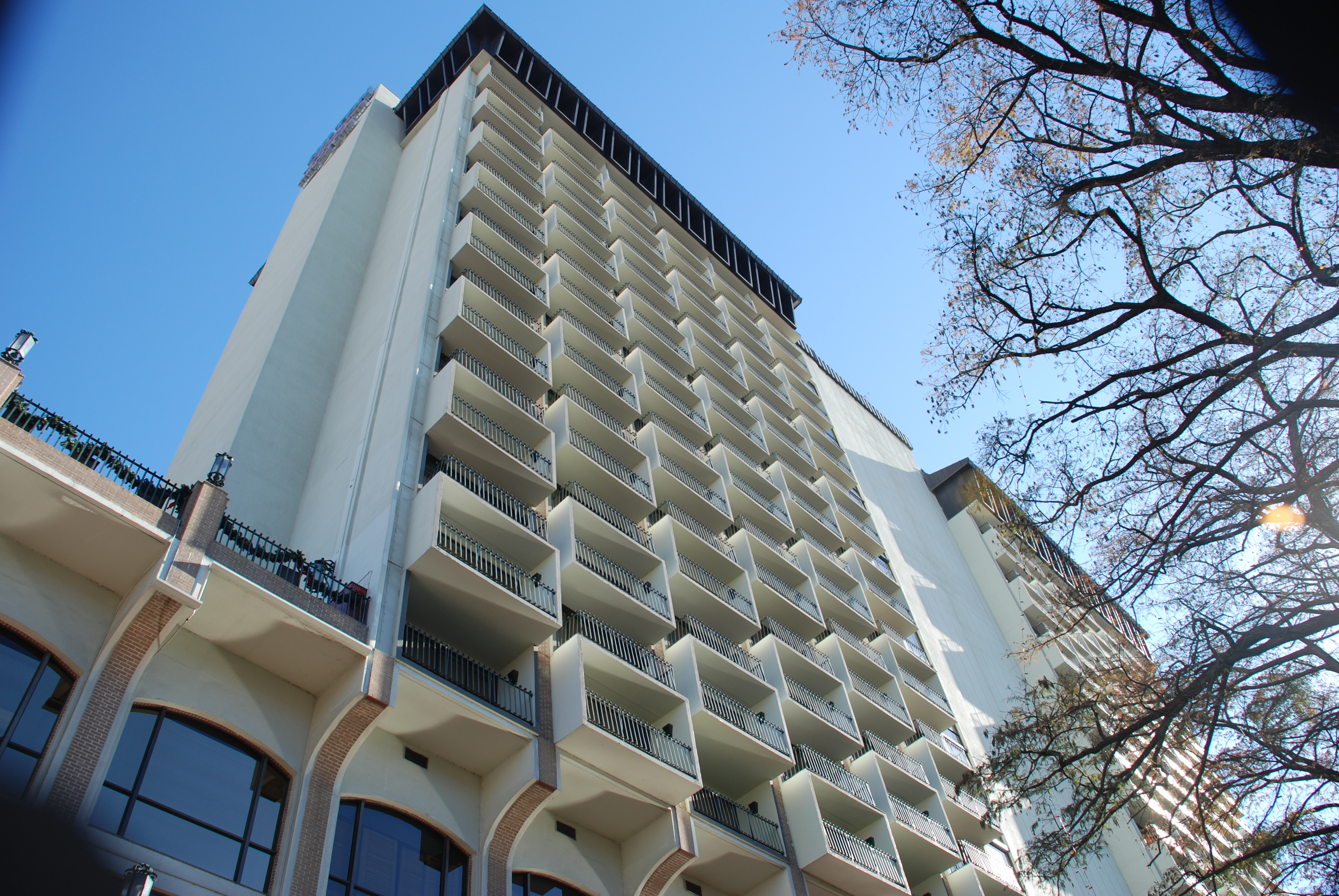
Hilton Palacio del Rio

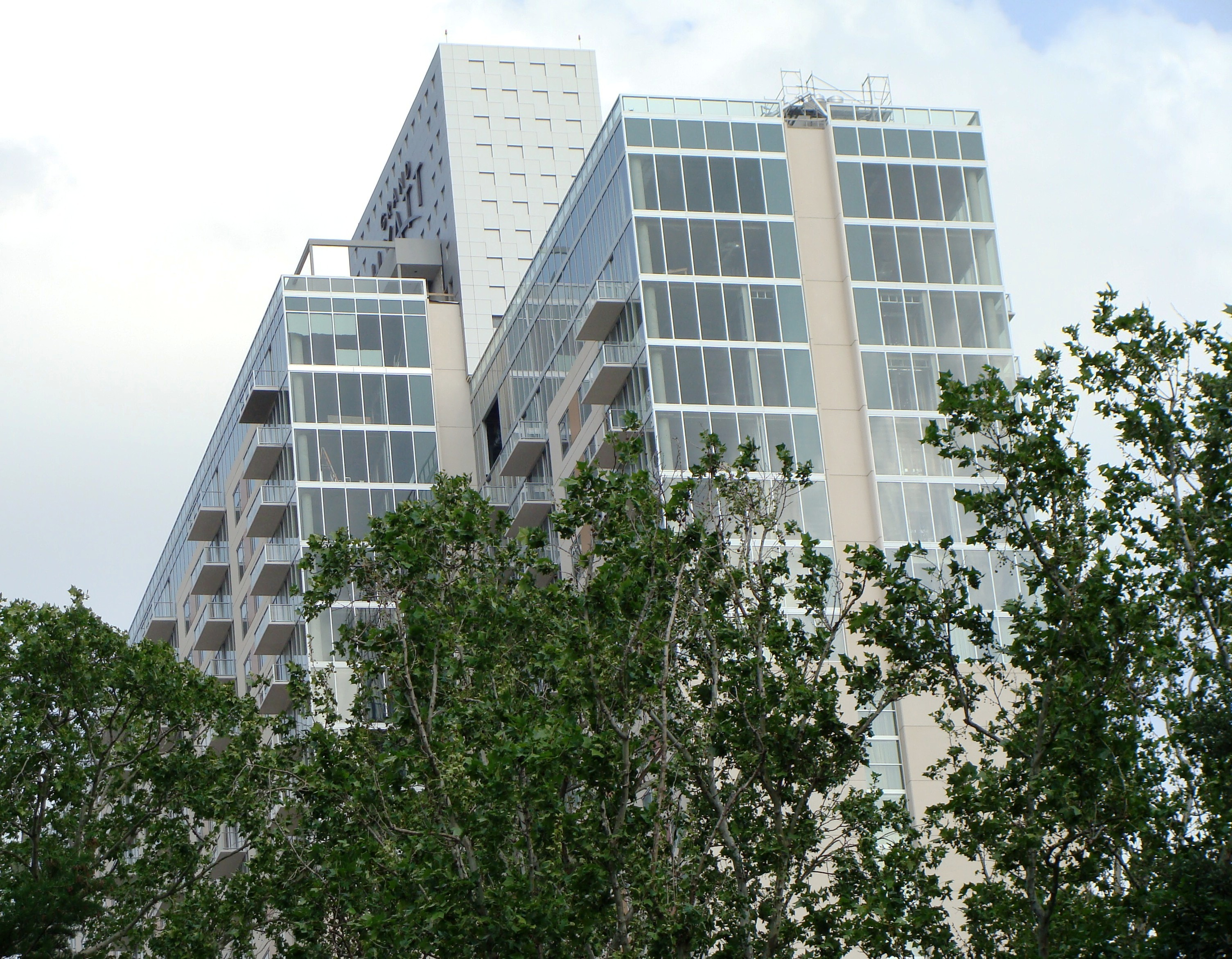
Grand Hyatt Hotel and Alteza Condominiums, San Antonio's newest major skyscraper.

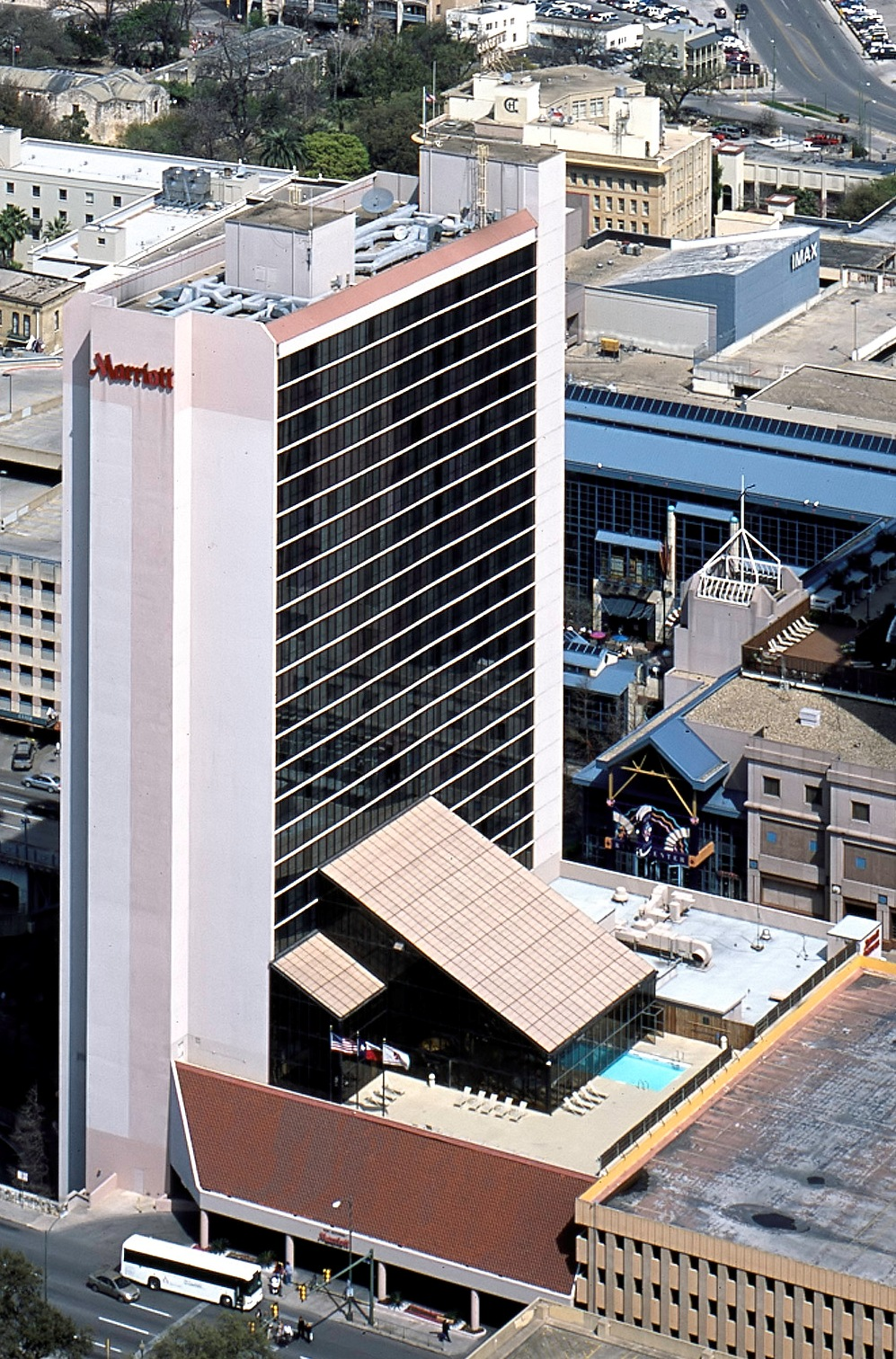
Marriott Riverwalk

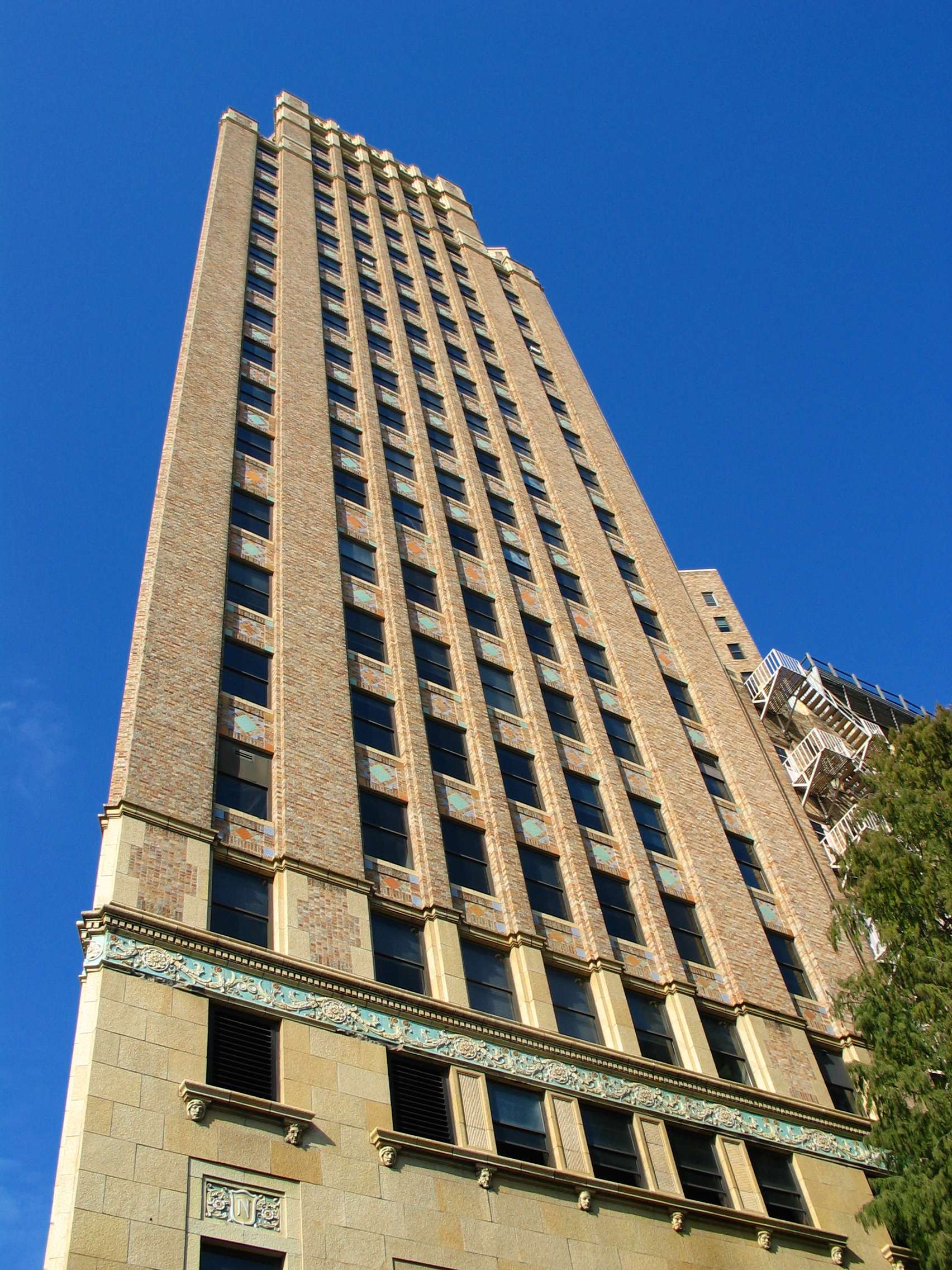
Nix Professional Building

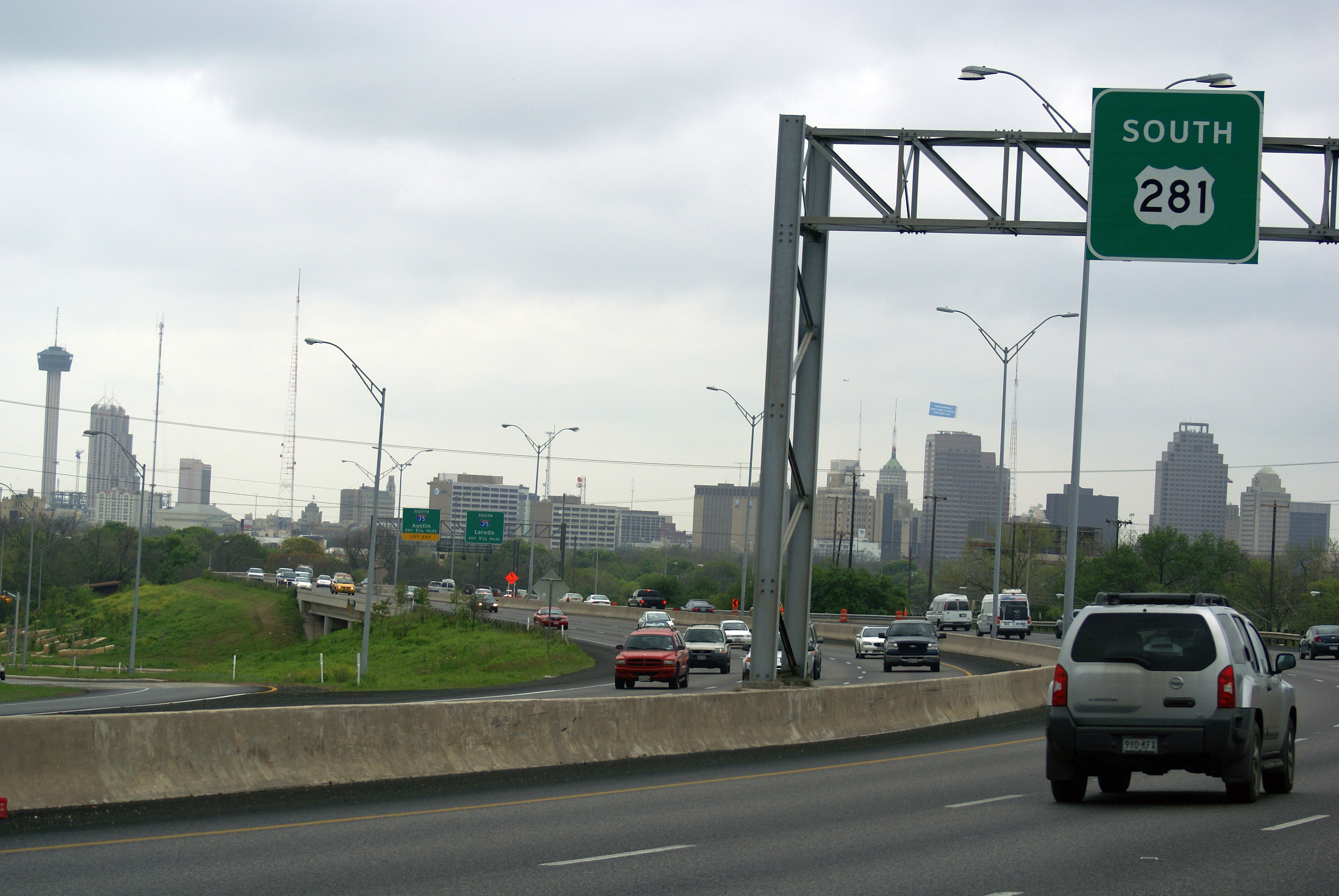
Downtown San Antonio from U.S. Route 281 southbound.

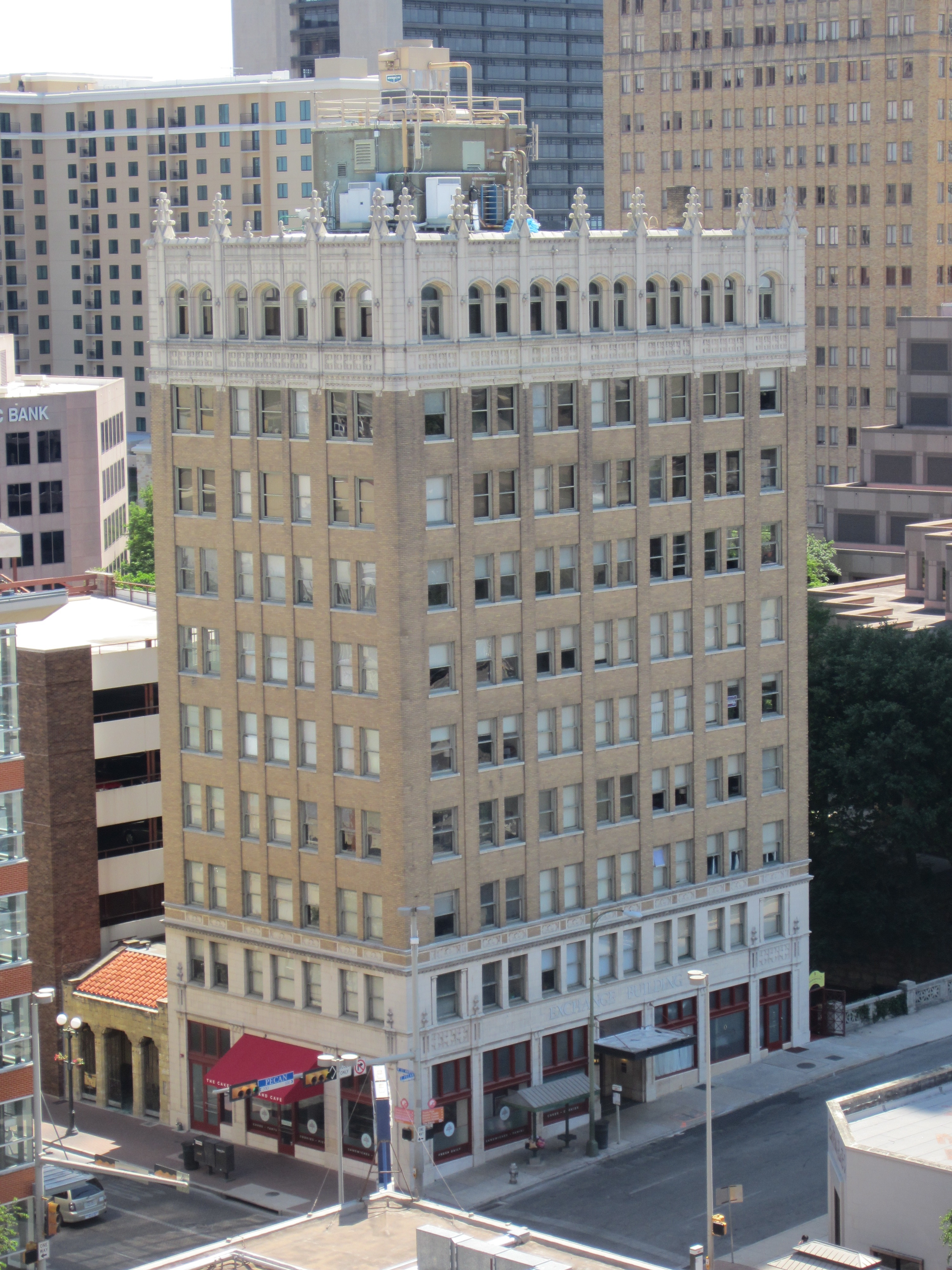
Exchange Building

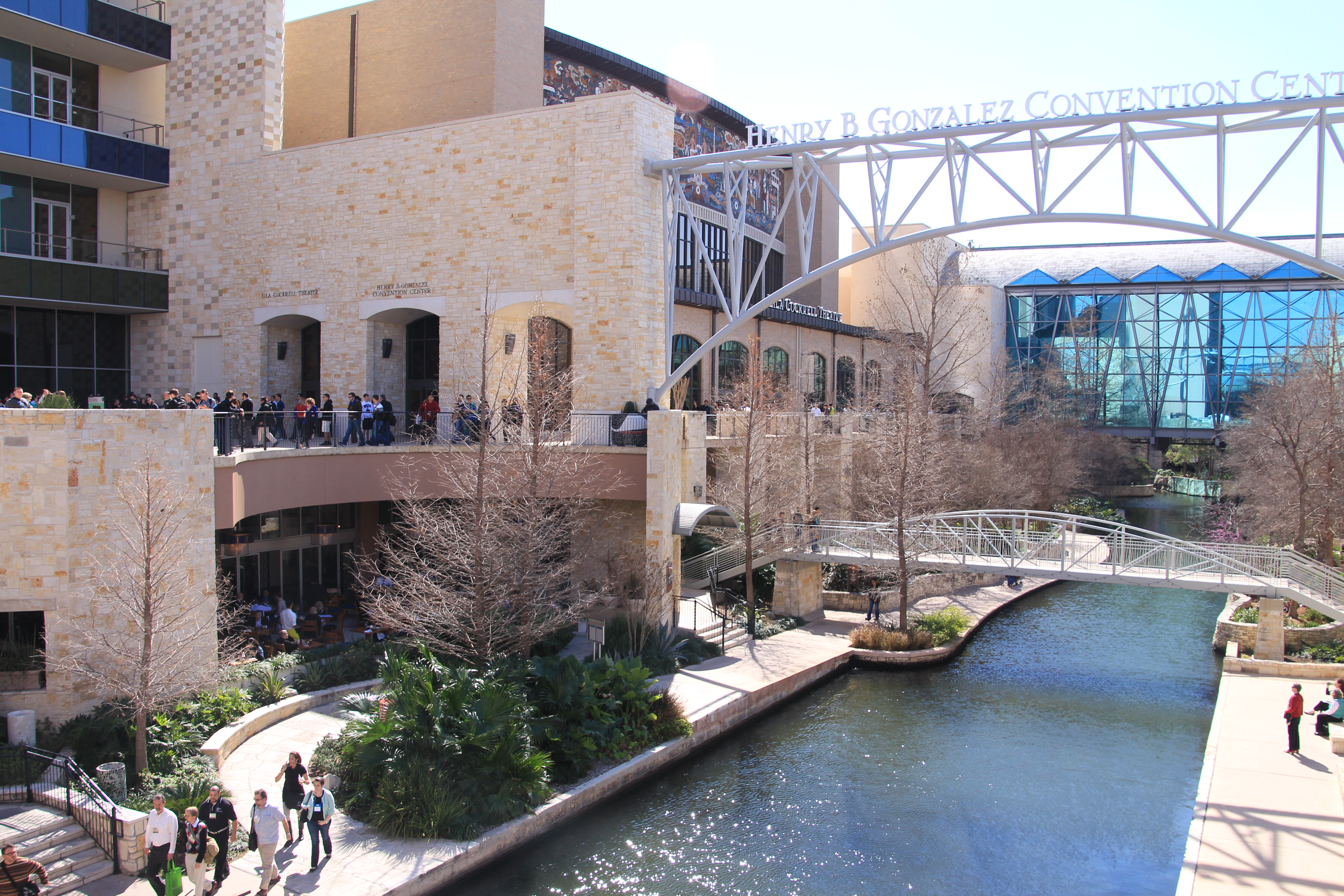
Henry B. Gonzalez Convention Center

== See also ==
- BiblioTech
- Carl Wilhelm August Groos House
- Museo Alameda
