= St. Joseph Catholic Church (San Antonio, Texas) =

Historic church in Texas, United States

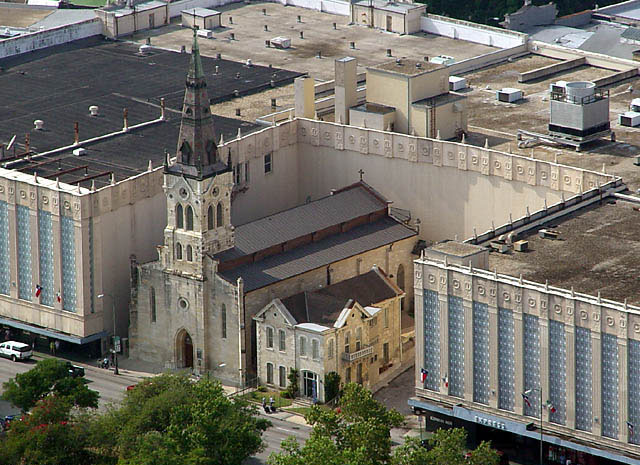
- Aerial view of St. Joseph Catholic Church, surrounded by the Shops at Rivercenter

- Location within Texas Location within the United States
- 29°25′25″N 98°29′11″W
- Location: 623 E. Commerce St., San Antonio, Texas, US
- Country: United States
- Denomination: Roman Catholic
- Website: St. Joseph Catholic Church

History
- Status: Parish church
- Dedication: Saint Joseph

Architecture
- Functional status: Active
- Architect(s): G. Friesleben, Theodore Giraud
- Style: Gothic Revival
- Groundbreaking: 1868
- Completed: 1876

Administration
- Archdiocese: San Antonio

Clergy
- Priest(s): Mark DelRosario, SSS; Anthony Schueller, SSS †; Joseph Thai Tran, SSS
- St. Joseph's Church and Rectory
- U.S. Historic district – Contributing property
- Recorded Texas Historic Landmark
- Part of: Alamo Plaza Historic District (ID77001425)
- RTHL No.: 5049

Significant dates
- Designated CP: July 13, 1977
- Designated RTHL: 1962

The St. Joseph Catholic Church is a Roman Catholic parish church in the Roman Catholic Archdiocese of San Antonio, located at 623 East Commerce Street in downtown San Antonio, Texas, United States. The Gothic Revival house of worship was the fourth Catholic parish in the city.

The church is an example of a holdout or nail house; when the archdiocese refused to sell the church to a property developer, a large shopping mall had to be constructed around it.

== Parish history ==
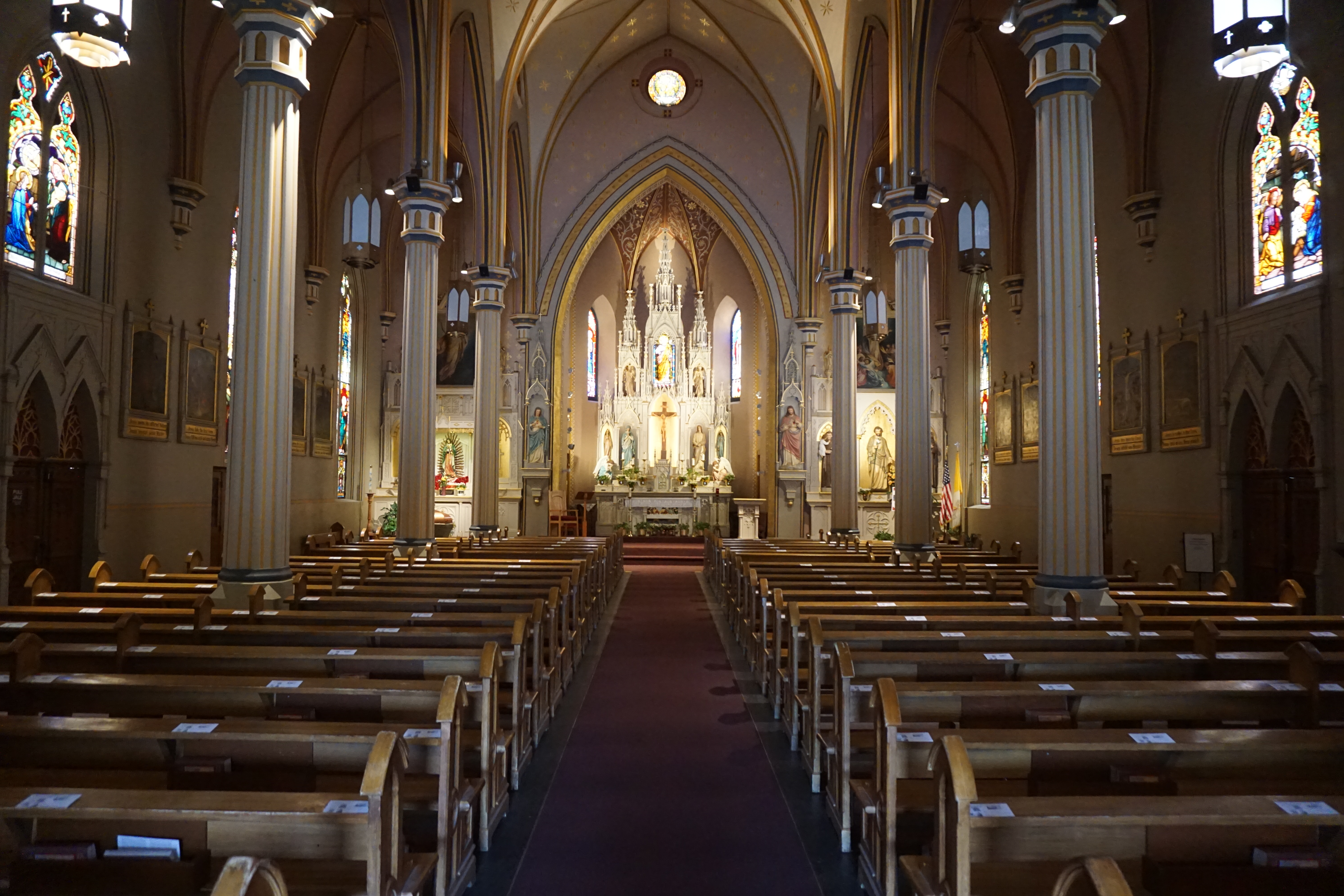
Interior

Cornerstone

The church occupies the probable second site of the Missión San Antonio de Valero (later known as the Alamo), before it was moved in 1724 to its present location. The cornerstone of the church was laid in 1868, and it was finally completed in 1871. It served a large and growing community of German immigrants. In the 1870s, Friar Henry Pfefferkorn, founder of the Liederkranz (male singing choir), painted the Annunciation and Assumption murals on the side altars. A steeple was added in 1898. Stained glass windows, imported from the Emil Frei Art Glass Factory in Munich were installed in 1902.

In 1944, Joske's department store (whose site would eventually become part of the Shops at Rivercenter complex) offered to buy the church grounds in order to develop it commercially. Parishioners unanimously refused the offer to move from the site and so instead Joske's built around the three sides of the church, earning the church from locals the moniker "St. Joske's". A restoration was commenced in 1981. Today, the parish serves as home to a multicultural community and as a popular attraction for tourists. Spanish-language masses are held with mariachi music and the San Antonio Liederkranz sings once a month.

== See also ==
- National Register of Historic Places listings in Bexar County, Texas
- Recorded Texas Historic Landmarks in Bexar County

== Bibliography ==
Notes

References

- Gerem, Yves (2001). A Marmac Guide to San Antonio (2001 ed.). Pelican Publishing. ISBN 9781455608546. - Total pages: 552
- Google Translate (2013). "Siehe die Wohnung Gottes bei den Menschen (German: See the house of worship for the people)". Google Translate.
- Lair, Gerald; Nawrocki, Susan (2008). Our San Antonio. Photographs by Mark Langford (2008 ed.). Quarto Group. ISBN 9781610604802. - Total pages: 112
- Levy, Abe (December 24, 2010). "St. Joseph's church evokes its German past". mysanantonio.com.
- St. Joseph Catholic Church (2013). "SAINT JOSEPH PARISH – About Us". St. Joseph Catholic Church.
- The San Antonio Liederkranz Inc (2013). "The San Antonio Liederkranz". The San Antonio Liederkranz Inc.
- thecatholicdirectory.com (2013). "St. Joseph Parish (Downtown) at 623 East Commerce St, San Antonio, Texas 78205 (Bexar County) United States". thecatholicdirectory.com.
- tripadvisor.com (2013). "Walking Tour of Some Downtown Attractions in San Antonio". TripAdvisor.
- visitsanantonio.com (2013). "The San Antonio You Don't Know (But Should)". visitsanantonio.com.
- Texas Monthly (1980). Shrines and Familiar places (Jun 1980 ed.). Texas Monthly.
- Untiedt, Kenneth L. (2008). Death Lore: Texas Rituals, Superstitions, and Legends of the Hereafter (2008 ed.). University of North Texas Press. ISBN 9781574412567. - Total pages: 275
- Williams, Docia Schultz Williams (2000). History and Mystery of the Menger Hotel (2000 ed.). Taylor Trade Publications. ISBN 9781556227929. - Total pages: 250
