= Bookless library =

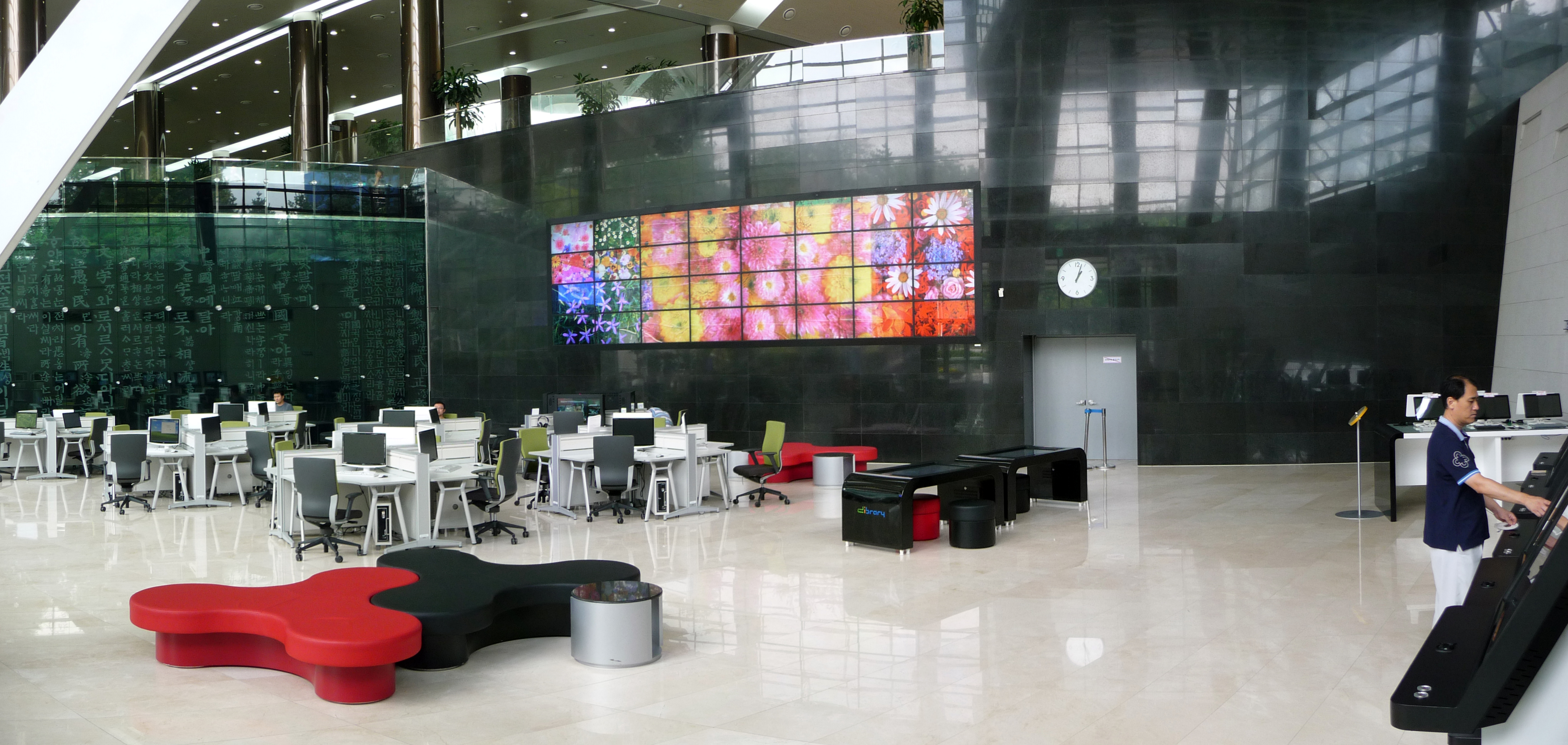
Entrance to the National Digital Library of Korea/Dibrary.

Bookless libraries are public, academic and school libraries that do not have any printed books. Instead they offer all-digital collections of literary works, reading material and scientific and academic research material. A bookless library typically uses the space that would have once been used for books to offer public computers, e-readers and other technology used to consume and produce digital media. Over the last decade, driven by changes in scholarly communication, several major research libraries have successfully become bookless.

== Outlook ==
Bookless libraries are often considered a potential model for future libraries, with modernization, increased availability of space and lower costs cited as potential benefits. However, bookless libraries face many challenges, including the public's strong attachment to print media in libraries. In 2002 the Santa Rosa Branch Library offered a digital-only library to patrons, only to bring books back into the library after a surge in public demand. Problems with access and copyright also limit the utility of bookless libraries, since a majority of digital content is still not available for borrowing online and much more has never been digitized. Library patrons are also resistant to the idea. In a 2013 Pew survey, only 20% of Americans said libraries should "definitely move some print books and stacks out of public locations to free up more space for things such as tech centers, reading rooms, meetings rooms, and cultural events."

== Examples ==
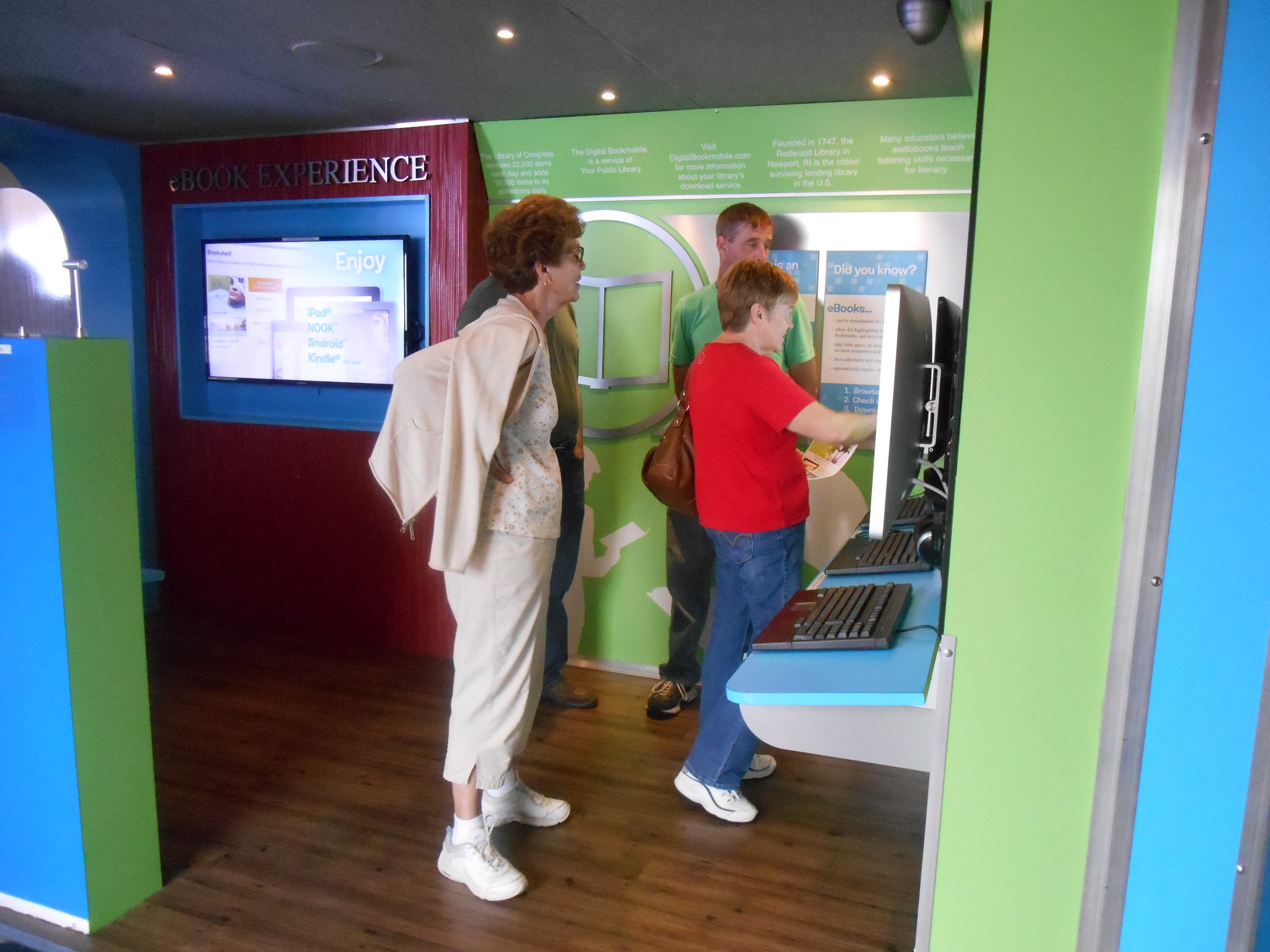
A digital bookmobile

In 2012, the William H. Welch Medical Library at Johns Hopkins University closed its physical building and moved completely online. “We’ve looked at the trends and seen that use of the building has gone down, the circulation of paper material has gone down, at the same time we’ve seen very large increases in the use of online materials," said the library's director, Nancy Roderer, in a 2012 interview with Library Journal. "That doesn’t mean it’s the right thing for other libraries but it is the right thing for us." In transitioning to a learning commons model, William Jewell College in Liberty, Missouri, replaced its print media with online resources in its reimagined library. The new Florida Polytechnic University library is also free of print media. The Director of Libraries, Kathryn Miller, notes the importance of access to information, regardless of form. "We want our students to recognize when they have an information need," she said, "and be able to locate the relevant information to apply it in a scholarly and, ultimately, professional way." Public libraries are also exploring bookless buildings. The BiblioTech library is one of the first bookless public libraries. Benilde-St. Margaret's, a Catholic preparatory school, removed nearly all printed books from its collection in 2011.

== See also ==
- Paperless office
- Paperless society
