= Shops at Rivercenter =

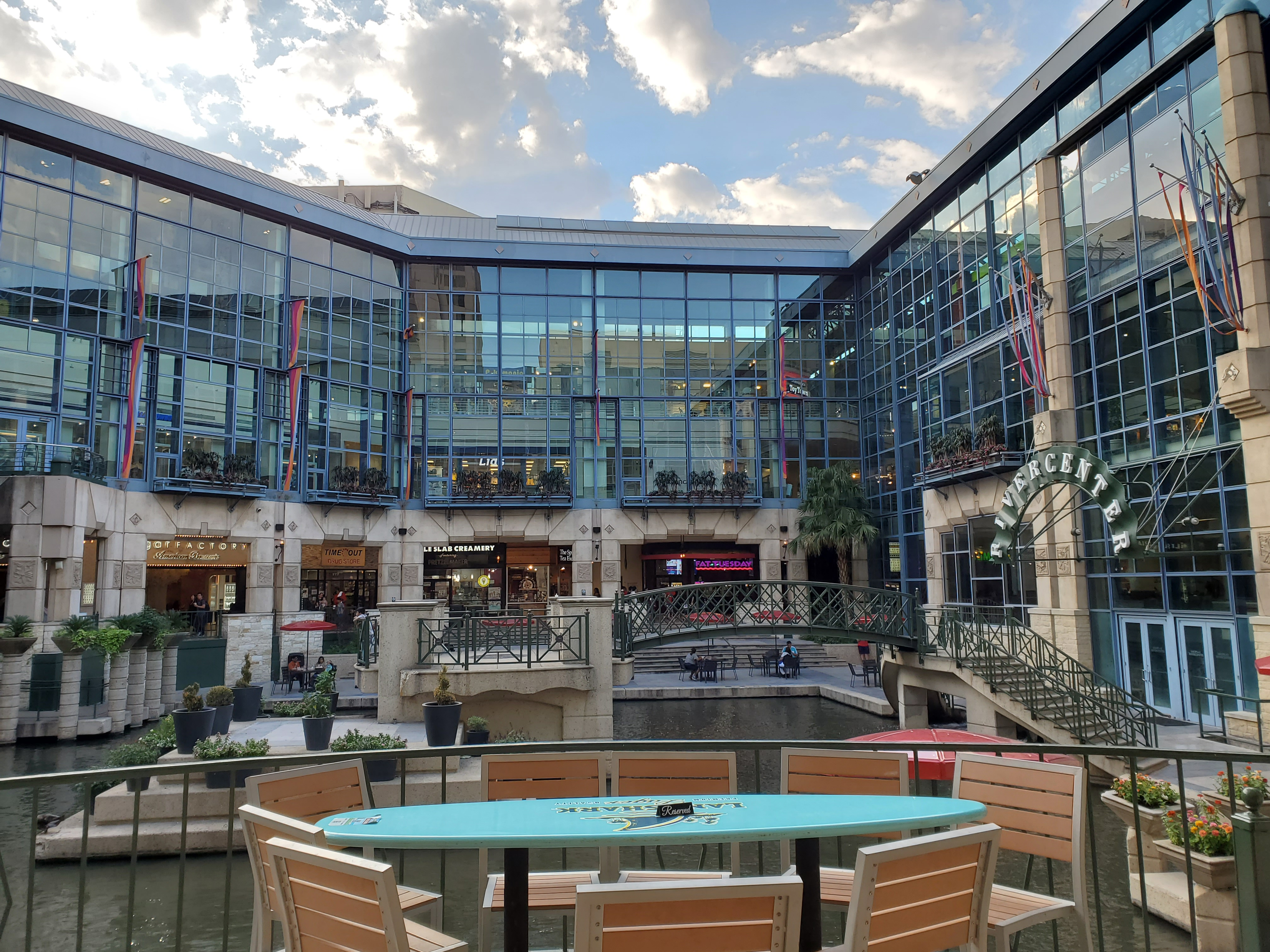
- Shops at the Rivercenter in San Antonio in 2022
- Location: San Antonio, Texas, United States
- Coordinates: 29°25′26″N 98°29′06″W
- Opened: 1988
- Developer: Edward J. DeBartolo Corporation
- Manager: Ashkenazy Acquisition Corporation
- Owner: Ashkenazy Acquisition Corporation
- Num. of stores: 86
- Num. of anchor tenants: 2
- Floor area: 1.06 million sq ft (98,000 m^{2})
- Floors: 4
- Website: shoprivercenter.com

The Shops at Rivercenter (formerly known as Rivercenter Mall) is a shopping mall located in Downtown San Antonio, Texas, United States along the city's River Walk. The anchor stores are H&M and AMC Theatres. It also includes a 38-story, 1,001-room Marriott hotel. It was purchased in 2005 by Ashkenazy Acquisition Corporation.

The landmark 1871 St. Joseph's Catholic Church did not sell to the original developers, Joske's Department Store, in 1945, and the store was built around it.

== History ==
The Shops at Rivercenter opened in 1988 as Rivercenter Mall, with San Antonio's first Lord & Taylor department store, an IMAX theater, as well as Dillard's (closed August 2008). Part of the downtown redevelopment included an extension of San Antonio's famed River Walk into the Rivercenter lagoon.

Lord & Taylor, then owned by May Department Stores, was converted into a Foley's in 1989. In 2006, the space became Macy's after Macy's parent, Federated Department Stores, bought May Department Stores. The structure that houses Dillard's, an AMC Theatres, as well as other shops originally opened in 1887 as a freestanding Joske's at the corner of Alamo and Commerce streets. Several expansions from 1909 to 1953 brought the space to 551,000 square feet (51,200 m^{2}). Joske's closed the flagship store for remodeling in 1987, planning to reopen in 1988, to coincide with the Rivercenter opening, but Dillard's acquired the Joske's chain shortly after the store closed for remodeling. The massive flagship store was divided up, with Dillard's occupying only a portion of the five-level building. The remaining area of the building was converted into lease space and a retail atrium for Rivercenter and an AMC movie theater. Even with the division of the building into other uses, portions of the structure, including 200,000 sq ft (19,000 m^{2}) of space on the top two floors, as well as the old "bargain basement," remained unoccupied.

In October 2006, plans were revealed to redevelop the property over a number of years. Five-star restaurants and more outdoor seating would be added in the first phase of redevelopment. The redevelopment of the Joske's space would be the next phase. The Joske's facade along Commerce Street would be restored, bringing back the windows and brick that were covered in one of Joske's own renovations before Rivercenter was built, and tenants would be added for the currently vacant two upper floors. A luxury hotel would be added in the last phase, forcing a multi-level parking garage to close, but another parking garage would be built on another part of the property. San Antonio's Historic and Design Review Commission approved the redevelopment plan on October 4, 2006. A grand re-opening is planned for 2008.

It was reported in June 2008 that Ashkenazy purchased the historic Joske's building from Dillard's and plans to revitalize the landmark property as part of the property's redevelopment.

In 2016, the old Joske's building was added as a new modern wing of the mall with notable tenants such as Dave & Buster's, H&M, Starbucks, and Johnny Rockets. The mall was renamed to Shops at Rivercenter in the same year.

On January 6, 2021, it was announced that Macy's would be closing in April 2021 as part of a plan to close 46 stores nationwide.

The mall contains four floors, and under the first floor, there is a river level. This is the part of the mall that runs along the famous River Walk.

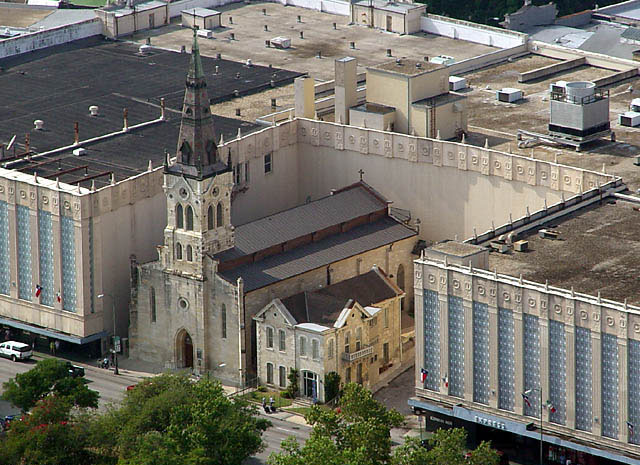
The shops were built around St. Joseph Catholic Church.

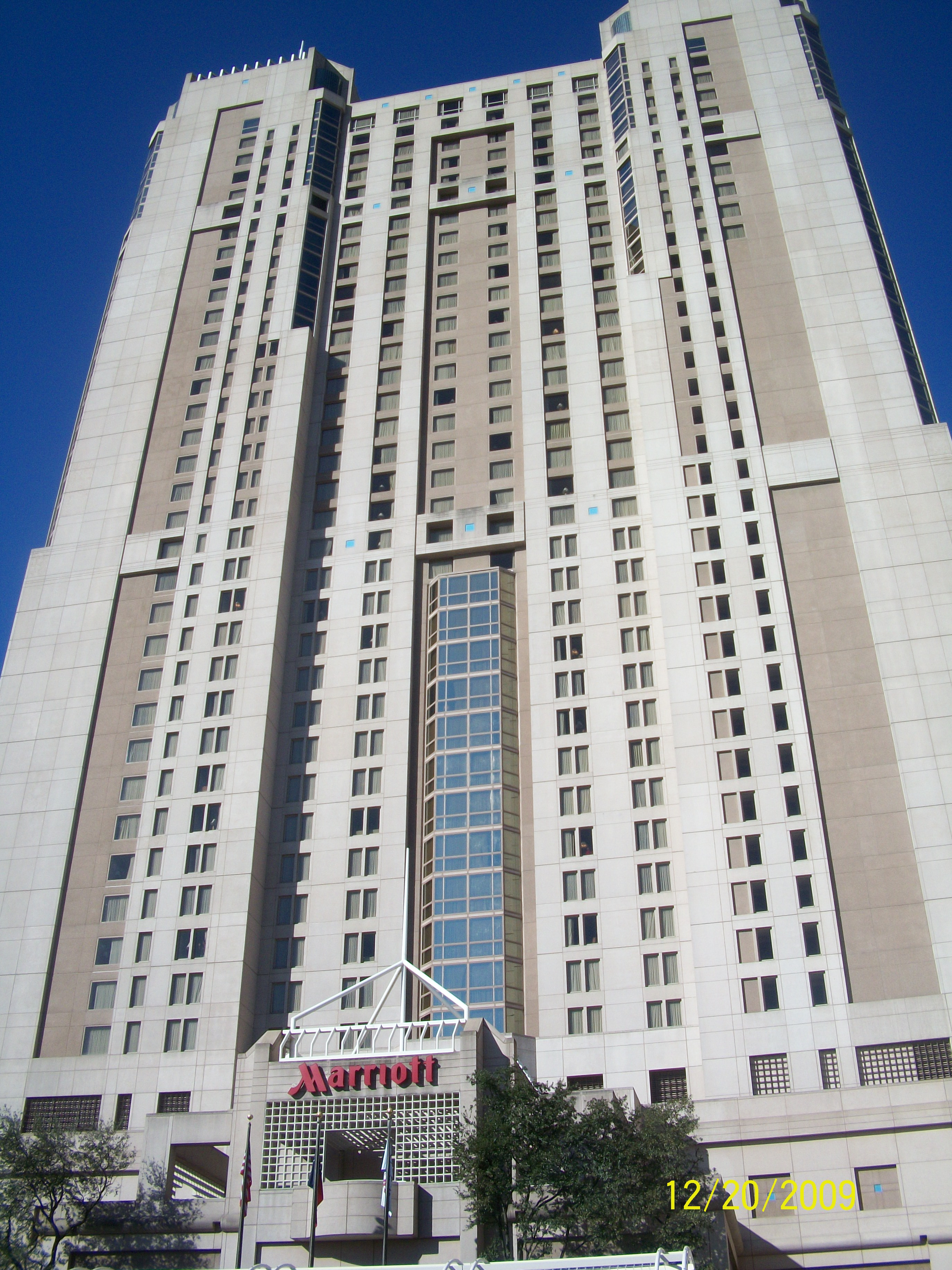
The Marriott Rivercenter

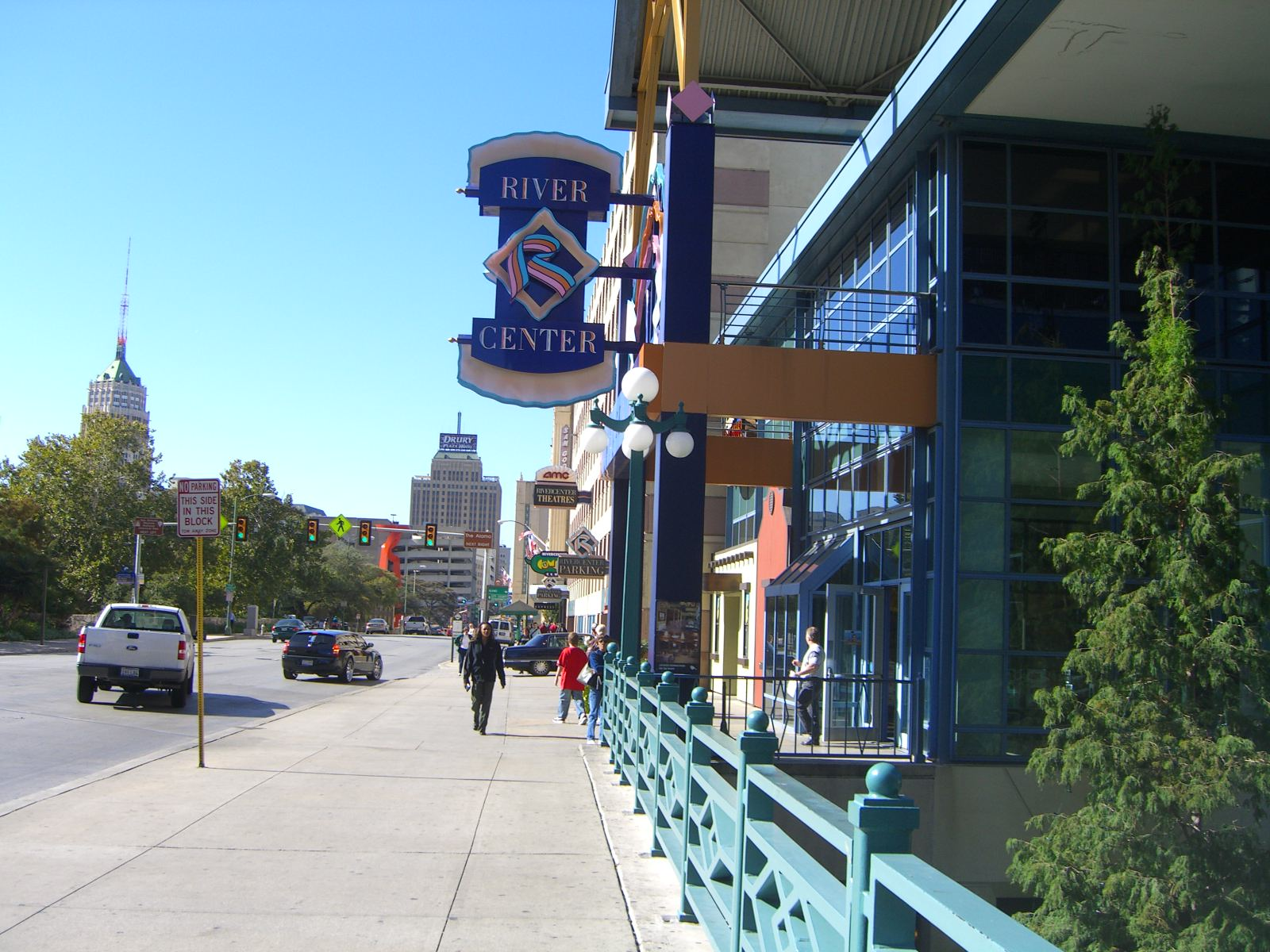
East Commerce entrance to Rivercenter
