= San Antonio Public Library =

Library system in San Antonio, Texas, U.S.

Coordinates: 29.43231°N 98.49275°W

The San Antonio Public Library (SAPL) is the public library system serving the city of San Antonio, Texas, United States. It consists of a central library, 29 branch libraries (as of the fall of 2017), and a library portal. SAPL was awarded the National Medal for Museum and Library Service in 2006.

In 2003, SAPL celebrated its centennial. New patrons received special centennial gold library cards instead of the usual purple cards.

== Central Library ==
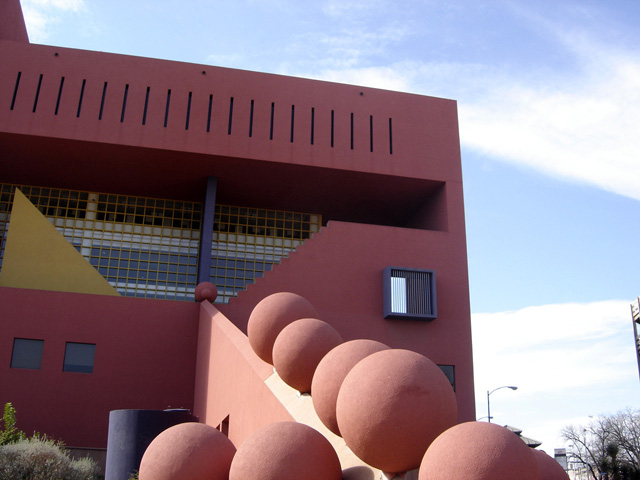
Central Library northeastern façade

The Central Library is a 240,000-square-foot (22,000 m^{2}), six-story structure that opened in 1995 in Downtown San Antonio. It is easily recognized by its bright-colored, striking "Mexican Modernist" design. The primary color of the building's exterior is popularly referred to by San Antonians as "Enchilada Red."

The architect for the building was selected by a design competition held by the city in July 1991. The winning design is by renowned Mexican architect Ricardo Legorreta in partnership with Sprinkle Robey Architects and Johnson-Dempsey & Associates of San Antonio. Unique features of the library include a multi-story, bright yellow atrium, and several outdoor plazas with landscaping and fountains intended to be used as outdoor reading rooms. In Legorreta's own words: "I wanted to break the concept that libraries are imposing."

The library was financed through a $28 million bond to build a new Central Library. The bonds were approved by San Antonio voters in 1989. In addition, another $10 million in funding from private sources and the city's general budget helped finance the murals and artwork inside the library, as well as new furniture, equipment, and fixtures.

The centerpiece of the library is a two-story glass blown sculpture named Fiesta Tower. It was created by Dale Chihuly in 2003.

Since its inauguration in May 1995, the new Central Library attracted a great deal of attention in architectural and library circles. After the new facility opened, circulation more than doubled from the previous year. The Central Library currently holds about 580,300 volumes.

=== Texana and genealogy ===
The Central library also houses the Texana/Genealogy Department. This department has been a part of the Central library since its opening in 1995 and is located on the sixth floor. The department occupies approximately 10,000 square feet, and has:

- approximately 60,000 microforms
- 75,000 books (some of which cannot be removed from the library but can be viewed at the library)
- 110 drawers of archival files
- 11 map cabinets
- extensive archival collections

The goal of the collection is to preserve and make available to patrons the history and culture of San Antonio, Bexar County, and Texas. Patrons can come in during Texana operating hours (9:00 AM – 5:00 PM Wednesday, Friday, Saturday or 12:00 PM – 8:00 PM Tuesday and Thursday) to study books and other items in the collection and receive assistance from staff if needed.

The Texana/Genealogy Department is a reference-only collection. The materials are not allowed to leave the department, but copies of some books are available for checkout in the circulating collection.

=== Latino Collection ===
The Latino Collection at Central is another expansive collection maintained and made available to the public.

It was established a year after the Central library opened in 1996, and was expanded to become the Latino Collection and Resource center in the fall of 2017. This expansion allowed the collection to be transferred from the 6th floor of the library to the 1st, where more patrons would have exposure and access to it. The 2017 expansion also allowed for space renovation and now there are "special spaces that allow the collection to be more meaningful and impactful through programming."

The collection is made up of materials in Spanish, and by and about Latinx authors. Items can be checked out for three weeks and returned to any branch location with a variance form. Patrons interested in checking out items should see the reference desk on the 1st floor.

== Previous buildings ==
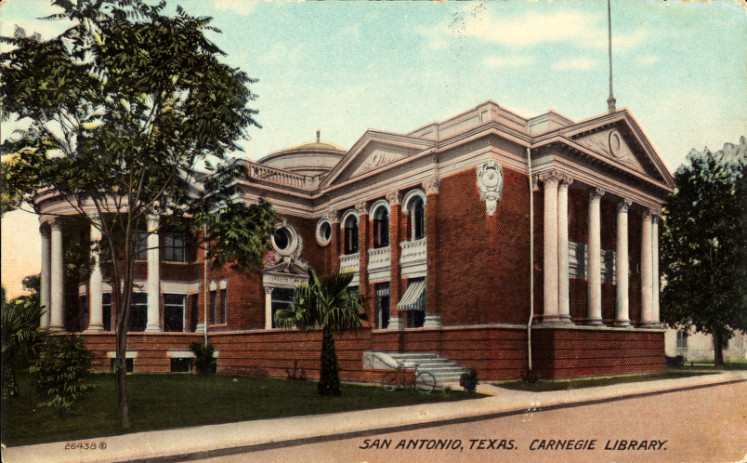
Carnegie Library, San Antonio, Texas (postcard, circa 1900–1924)

The previous Central Library building at 203 S St. Marys Street was renovated and reopened in 1998. The building, which is located on the River Walk, was renamed the International Center and is primarily used as office space. It houses the city's Department of International Affairs, the San Antonio Convention and Visitors Bureau, the Trade Commission of Mexico-BancoMext, Casa Tamaulipas, and Casa Nuevo Leonthe as well as the headquarters for the building's primary tenant, the North American Development Bank.

The original San Antonio Public Library building, which backs up to the Riverwalk at 210 Market Street, served as the main library from 1930 to 1968, and was from 1968 to 2005 the home of the Hertzberg Circus Museum. In 2006, it was leased to the National Western Art Foundation and underwent renovation to currently house the Dolph and Janie Briscoe Western Art Museum.

== Branch libraries ==
In addition to the Central Library, SAPL has 29 branch libraries located throughout the San Antonio area. Some branches offer walking trails, fitness stations, and/or playgrounds. During election season, certain locations become voting sites.

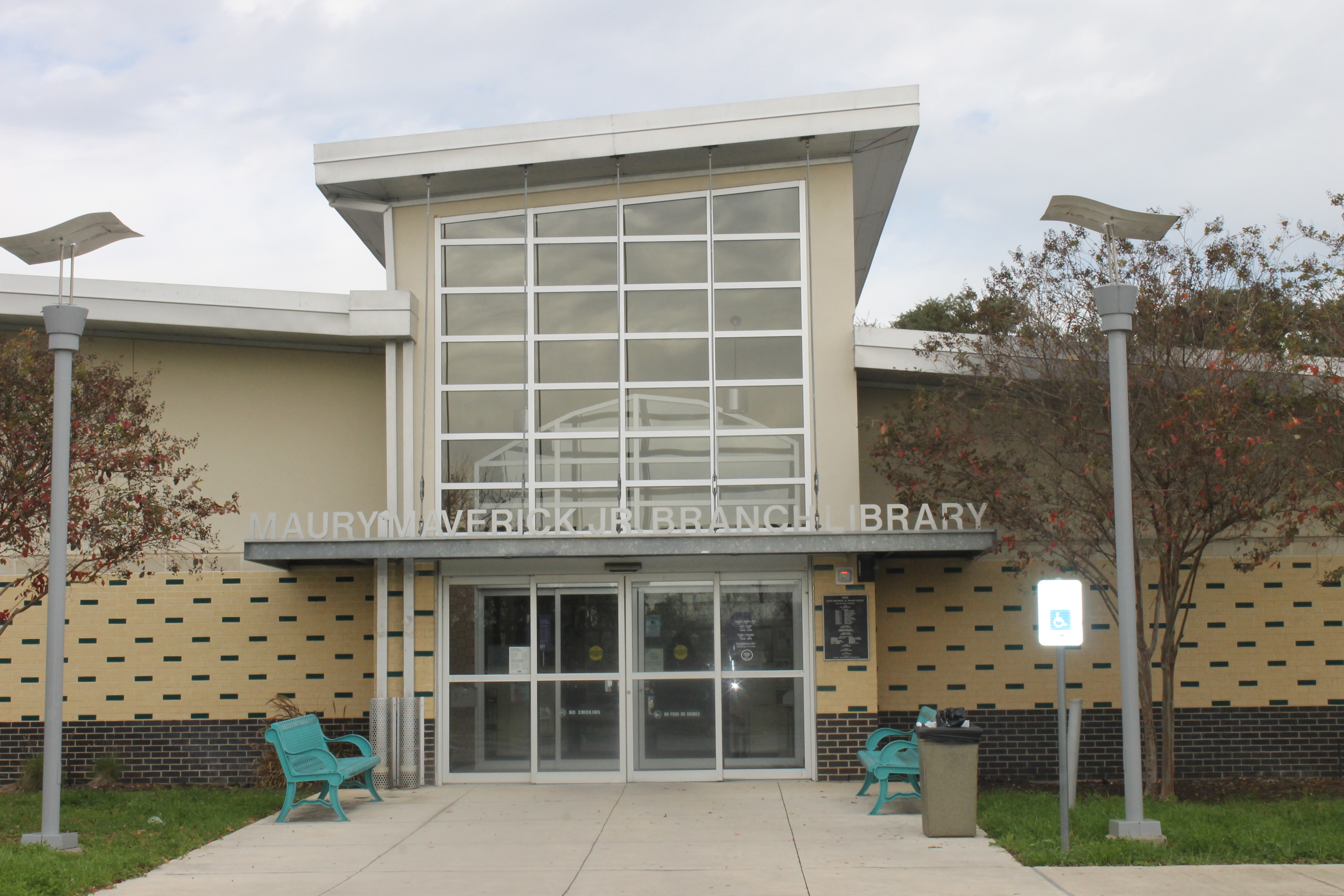
Maury Maverick Jr. Branch Library

- Bazan Library
- Brook Hollow Library
- Carver Library
- Cody Library
- Collins Garden Library
- Cortez Library
- Encino Library
- Forest Hills Library
- Great Northwest Library
- Guerra Library
- Igo Library
- Johnston Library
- Kampmann Library
- Landa Library
- Las Palmas Library
- Maverick Library
- McCreless Library
- Memorial Library
- Mission Library
- Pan American Library
- Parman Library
- Potranco Library
- Pruitt Library
- San Pedro Library
- Schaefer Library
- Semmes Library
- Thousand Oaks Library
- Tobin Library
- Westfall Library

== Gallery ==
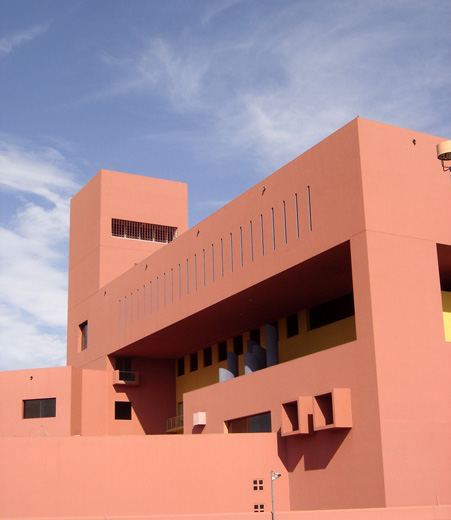
Central Library southwestern façade

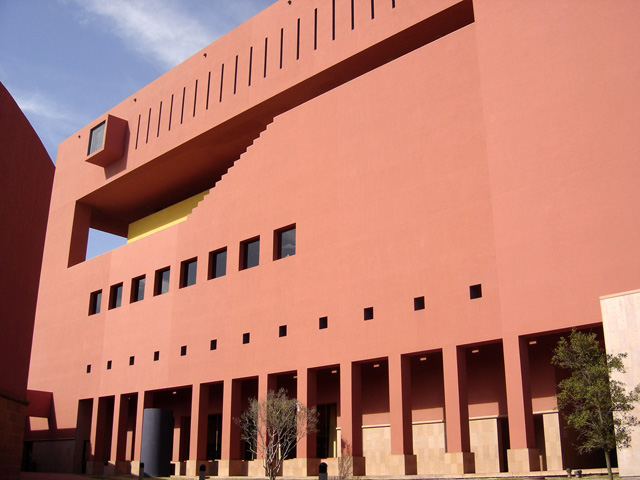
Central Library southeastern façade

== See also ==
- BiblioTech (San Antonio)
