= Joske's =

American department store chain

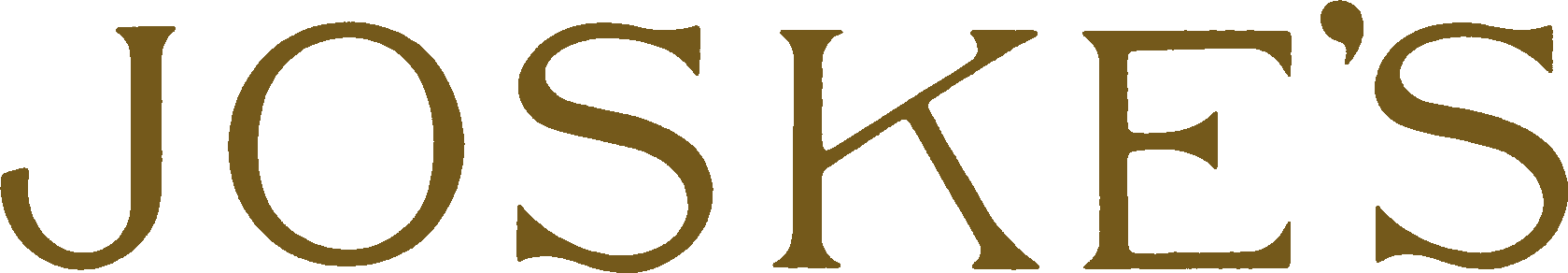
Joske's final logo

Joske's, founded by German immigrant Julius Joske in 1867, was a department store chain originally based in San Antonio, Texas. In December 1928, Hahn Department Stores acquired the company along with the Titche-Goettinger department store of Dallas, and three years later Hahn became part of Allied Stores. Allied was taken over by Campeau in 1986, and Campeau in turn sold the Joske's chain in 1987 to Dillard's. All Joske's stores were then quickly converted into Dillard's locations.

== Origins ==
Joske's first store, located on Main Plaza in San Antonio and known as J. Joske, opened in 1867 and operated until 1873, when Joske sold it and went back to Berlin for his family. After returning to San Antonio the same year, Joske opened a new store on Austin Street called J. Joske and Sons. Joske moved the store to Alamo Plaza and changed its name to Joske Brothers.

Joske's flagship store at Alamo and Commerce Streets in Downtown San Antonio. This postcard is believed to depict the store before the 1909 expansion.

== Flagship store ==
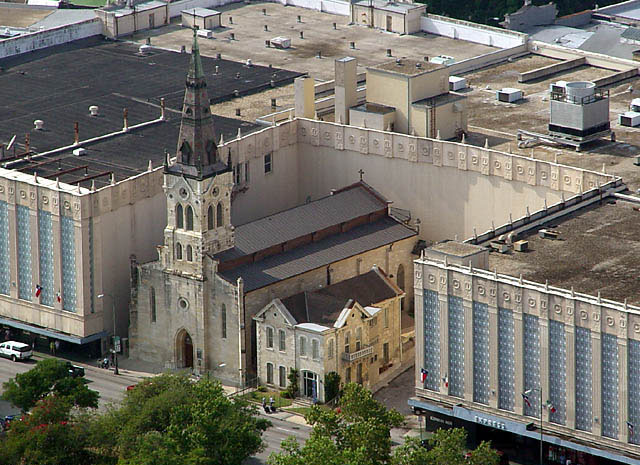
St. Joseph's Catholic Church (affectionately referred to by locals as "St. Joske's" even years after the acquisition by Dillard's) is surrounded on three sides by the former Joske's flagship store.

Dillard's occupied only two floors of the flagship store's southwest wing. The store closed in August 2008 and the building now awaits redevelopment.

In 1887 the store was moved across the street to the corner of Alamo and Commerce Streets, overlooking historic Alamo Plaza. New floors and elevators were added during a 1909 expansion. In 1936, the five-level store became the first fully air-conditioned store in Texas, and the store became known as "The Big Store."

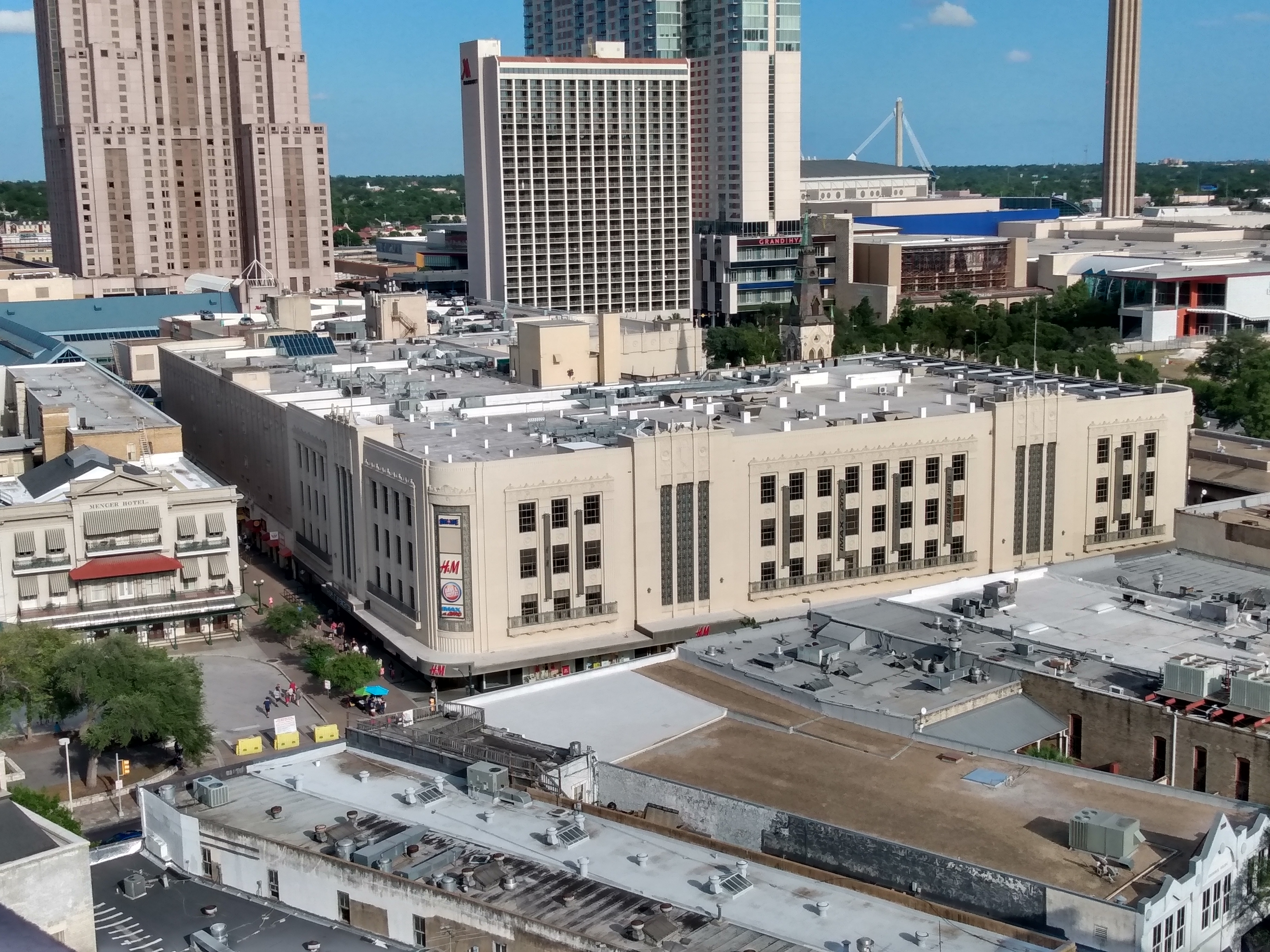
Bird's eye view of Joske's Department store building

The store was expanded and renovated again in 1939, sporting a new Art Deco facade as well as the first escalators installed in a Texas store. To make way for this expansion, the rooftop electric sign, the largest in Texas, where a cowboy was shown lassoing a steer came down. When Joske's wanted to expand again in 1945, nearby St. Joseph's Catholic Church refused to sell its land. Nevertheless, Joske's kept expanding, and St. Joseph's was eventually surrounded on three sides by the store and was jokingly called "St. Joske's." By 1953 the flagship store had been expanded several times. The 551,000 sq ft (51,200 m^{2}) five-level store was the largest department store west of the Mississippi until its closure in 1987. The long-time slogan for the chain was "the biggest store in the biggest state."

At one time, a shopper could get a custom-made saddle in the downtown store. Departments included spurs and saddles; appliances; a travel agency; an Oriental rug gallery; a lending library; a bakery; gourmet foods; books, toys and even a large postage stamp collecting area. Joske's flagship store also featured the Camellia Room (for formal dining), the Chuck Wagon, and the Fountain Room (a coffee shop).

During the Christmas holidays, the flagship store was well known for its fourth-floor "Fantasyland"; its holiday-themed window displays, including a large window with a toy train set; and the 40-foot-tall Santa Claus that sat atop the roof. "Rusty the Reinsteer" was the Joske's holiday mascot.

== Expansion ==
The Joske's logo

Concentrating on keeping the downtown flagship store a destination location, Joske's of Texas (as the chain became known) did not expand to a suburban location until 1957, when it opened its second store in the Las Palmas Shopping Center in southwest San Antonio. Built by Bartlett Cocke & Associates now known as Muñoz & Company.

In January 1965, Joske's purchased rival Wolff and Marx with its downtown flagship and North Star Mall locations. Joske's stated that there would be no immediate changes in operation of Wolff and Marx, however, in less than a month the seven-story downtown Wolff and Marx store was closed because the store did not have escalators and the building had passed its useful life as a modern department store. Joske's sold the downtown Wolff and Marx building in 1968, and the building is now known as the Rand Building. The North Star Mall Wolff and Marx location was replaced in 1969 with a new five-level Joske's, its third San Antonio-area store.

The chain expanded into Houston in 1948 and opened a location at the Highland Mall in Austin in 1971.

Joske's purchased two mall locations in El Paso, and Phoenix, Arizona (Joske's first and only location outside Texas), from Liberty House in 1978.

In 1979 Allied's Titche-Goettinger's stores (more commonly known as Titche's) in Dallas were renamed Joske's.

In 1985 Allied Stores consolidated Joske's three Texas divisions—Dallas, Houston and San Antonio—into one central division based in downtown Dallas. The three independent operating and merchandising staffs in the separate divisions were consolidated into a single, larger unit, and Robert T. Mettler was named president and chief executive officer of the combined organization. The corporate office was located at its Downtown Dallas store at Main and St. Paul streets, occupying the top three floors of the seven-story building. At the time, Allied's Joske's division had 6,200 employees, including 800 at its corporate offices, and 27 stores.

== Civil Rights era ==
In the wake of the Greensboro sit-ins in North Carolina that received wide publicity, desegregation in San Antonio was carried out voluntarily by most eating places in March 1960 after hearing demands from African-American leaders and both black and white churches. However, the management of Joske's declared that blacks could eat in its basement lunch counter, but its two restaurants would remain open to whites only, and hired guards to keep blacks out. However, after a number of protests and an incident of pushing and slapping, Joske's management changed course and by late summer admitted blacks to all its eating facilities.

== Acquisition and closure ==
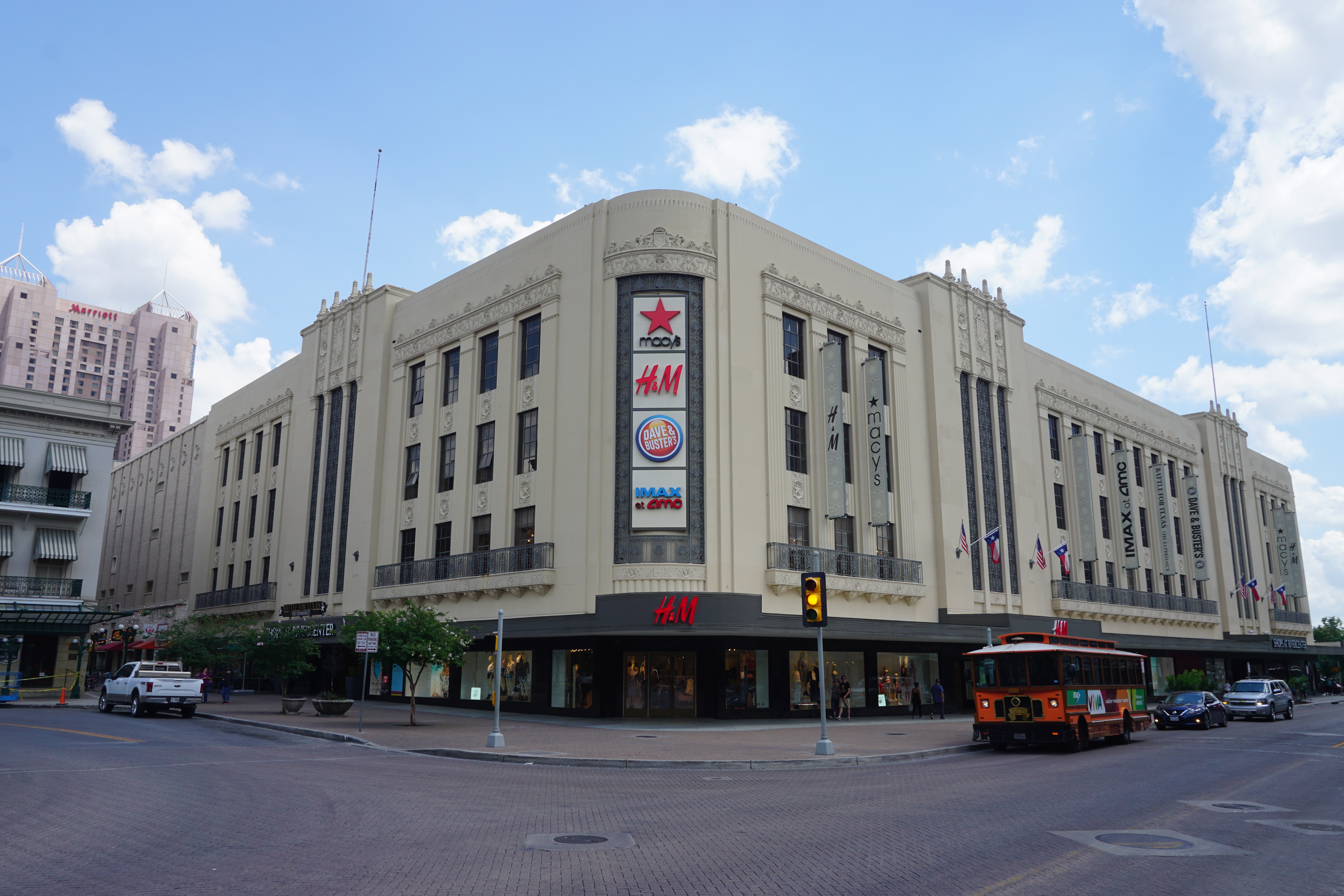
Joske's former flagship store in 2018

The southeast wing of the closed flagship store currently houses a Limited Express on the street level.

In 1987 after Allied's acquisition by Campeau, the then 27-store Joske's chain was sold to Dillard's, a then 115-store chain based in Little Rock, Arkansas, ending over 100 years of Texas-based retailing.

The San Antonio Conservation Society requested that Dillard's keep the Joske's name on the downtown San Antonio flagship store. The society wrote a letter to then Dillard's President William E. Dillard II urging that the store name be retained.

After the acquisition, the massive flagship store was divided up, with Dillard's occupying only a portion of the five-level building. The remaining area of the building was converted into lease space and a retail atrium for Rivercenter (which was under construction at the time of the buyout) and an AMC movie theater. Even with the division of the building into other uses, portions of the structure, including the old "bargain basement," remain unoccupied to this day. A redevelopment plan was revealed in October 2006, in which the Joske's facade along Commerce Street would be restored, bringing back the windows and brick that were covered in one of Joske's own renovations before Rivercenter was built, and tenants would be added for the 200,000 sq ft (20,000 m^{2}) of retail space currently vacant on two upper floors. San Antonio's Historic and Design Review Commission approved the redevelopment plan on October 4, 2006.

It was reported in June 2008 that the historic Joske's building was purchased by the Rivercenter property owners from Dillard's, with plans to revitalize the landmark property as part of the property's redevelopment. Dillard's closed its doors in August 2008, and the building currently sits empty, awaiting redevelopment.

It was the last traditional downtown department store operated by Dillard's.
