= BiblioTech (Bexar County) =

All-digital public library in Texas

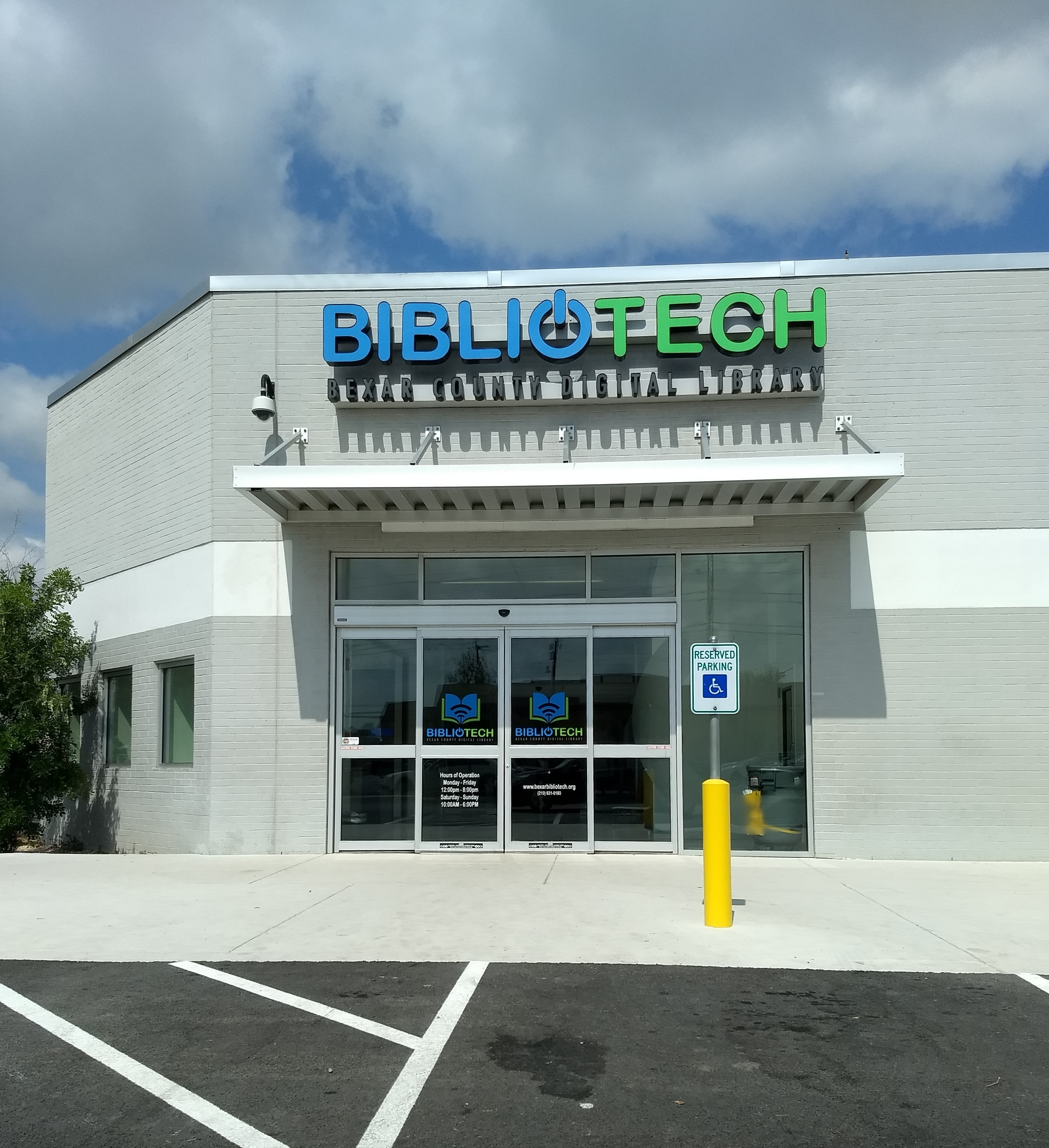
- BiblioTech South
- 29.3442°N 98.5049°W
- Location: Bexar County, Texas, United States
- Type: Public library, bookless library
- Established: September 14, 2013

Other information
- Director: Laura Cole
- Website: bexarbibliotech.org

BiblioTech is the first all-digital public library in the United States. It serves residents of Bexar County, Texas. There are four BiblioTech branches and one satellite branch.

== History ==
The first BiblioTech location opened on September 14, 2013. The County-operated library cost $2.3 million (USD) and is located in the underserved south side of San Antonio. San Antonio is the second largest city in Texas and the seventh largest city in the U.S., but ranks 60th in literacy. The library had over 400,000 visitors in its first four years.

BiblioTech's second branch, BiblioTech West, opened in July 2015 on the west side of San Antonio; it also serves the residents of Bexar County. A third branch, on the city's east side, opened in April 2018. Their fourth branch, The Nelson and Tracy Wolff BiblioTech EDU, opened in December 2022 near downtown San Antonio and serves both residents of Bexar County as well as students on the shared campus of Fox Tech, Cast Tech and ALA.

== Offerings ==
The library lends e-readers and digital content rather than physical media. BiblioTech lends e-readers to those with a BiblioTech card; about half of the e-readers are on loan at any given time. Members with a library card can also download the cloudLibrary app to read eBooks from their personal device (iOS, Android, Windows).

BiblioTech also offers online databases and educational resources, programming, and many touch-screen video tablets.

=== List of databases ===
The library arranges for patrons to access digital content from several providers. All resources are free of charge to Bexar County residents.

Title	Producer	Access
CloudLibrary	OCLC.	Library card
Heritage Quest	Cambridge Information Group	
Hoopla	Midwest Tape LLC	
Learning Express Library	LearningExpress, LLC	
LinkedIn Learning	from LinkedIn	
Mango	Creative Empire, LLC	
NewsBank	NewsBank, Inc.	
Newspaper Archive	Heritage Microfilm, Inc.	
ProQuest	Cambridge Information Group	
TexShare Database Collection		

== Comparison to traditional libraries ==
All-digital libraries have existed on college campuses for years, but this is the first all-digital public library. The county also saved millions on some expenses, the architecture, and furniture required to store books, as well as the infrastructure to bear the weight of the books. The volumes they offer cost about the same as the physical books.

Some readers prefer nondigital libraries. For critic Jeff Jacoby, BiblioTech's all-digital library model lacks sensory enticements (such as shelves of books) that he believes foster serendipity in information discovery. He also notes the efficiency of printed books and appropriate delivery systems (such as Biblioburro) in some nonurban locales.

== See also ==
- San Antonio Public Library
