= Culture of San Antonio =

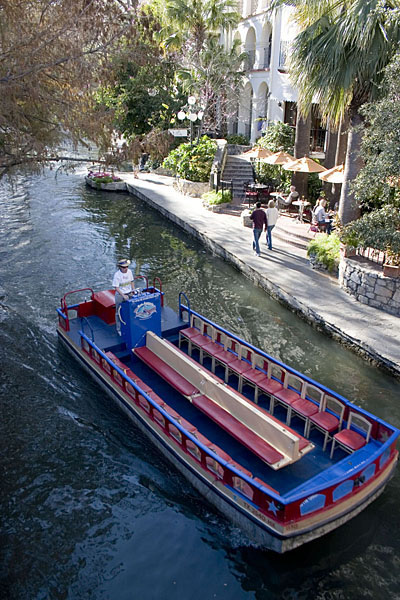
The San Antonio River Walk

The culture of San Antonio reflects the history and culture of one of the state's oldest and largest cities straddling the regional and cultural divide between South and Central Texas. Historically, San Antonio culture comes from a blend of Central Texas (Hill Country) and South Texas (Southwestern) culture. Founded as a Spanish outpost and the first civil settlement in Texas, San Antonio is heavily influenced by Mexican American culture due to Texas formerly being part of Mexico and, previously, the Spanish Empire. The city also has significant German, Anglo, and African American cultural influences. San Antonio offers a host of cultural institutions, events, restaurants and nightlife in South Texas for both residents and visitors alike. The municipal government of San Antonio keeps a website regarding funding for the arts, which bears the name getcreativesanantonio.

== Annual culture events ==
- Bandera, just 40 miles northwest of San Antonio, hosts a three-day Cowboy Mardi Gras that attracts over 15 thousand people from all over the world to the town of 829 residents.
- Celebrate San Antonio is the city's New Year's Eve celebration held on South Alamo Street adjacent to HemisFair Park. The festival has several stages with music, food, family activities and more. The evening culminates with a fireworks show to celebrate New Year's Eve.
- Cinco de Mayo festivities take place in Market Square.
- Fiesta San Antonio is an annual 10-day citywide festival held in April to honor the memory of those who fought in the Battle of the Alamo and the Battle of San Jacinto. Over 100 events take place during the anniversary of Texas' independence from Mexico. The festival dates back to 1891, when a group of women decorated horse-drawn carriages, paraded in front of the Alamo, and pelted each other with flower blossoms. By 1895, the parade had developed into a week-long celebration and today this event, referred to as the Battle of Flowers Parade, is the main event of the celebration. Other events during Fiesta are Texas Cavaliers River Parade, Fiesta Flambeau Night Parade, A Night in Old San Antonio, the King William Street Fair, the St. Mary's University's Fiesta Oyster Bake, Fiesta Arts Fair, and Cornyation.
- Fiesta de las Luminarias takes place on the River Walk where the river is lined with 7,000 luminarias to light Mary and Joseph's path, re-enacting the Bible story of their search for shelter on the night before Jesus' birth. The procession is a Mexican-American tradition and takes place on nine nights in December. The festival procession has been held on the River Walk since 1973.

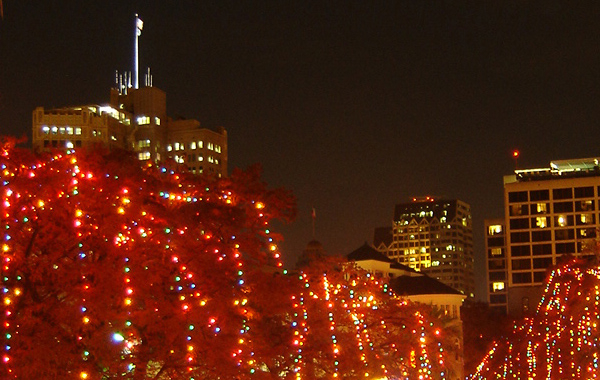
Downtown San Antonio at Christmas time

- The Holiday River Parade and Lighting Ceremony is presented by the Paseo del Rio Association and the City of San Antonio the day after Thanksgiving when over 122,000 lights are switched on to illuminate the River Walk. Decorated floats travel down the river ending with a float featuring Santa Claus, as well as a San Antonio Hispanic counterpart known as "Pancho Claus".
- The Passion Play held at the Cathedral of San Fernando, the oldest Roman Catholic cathedral in the U.S., portrays the story of the Crucifixion of Jesus every Good Friday. The play has been held here since 1764.
- The Michelob ULTRA River Walk Mud Festival is a festival to commemorate the yearly maintenance and draining of the channeled portion of the River Walk. Held each January since 1986, the festival crowns a Mud King and Queen, holds an art festival, Mud Parade, and Pub Crawl.
- The San Antonio Film Festival (previously known as the San Antonio Underground Film Festival) was founded in 1994 by executive director Adam Rocha. The festival screens competing feature films and shorts, and offers workshops for filmmakers.
- The San Antonio Stock Show & Rodeo, established in 1950, is a 16-day event held in February at the AT&T Center and Freeman Coliseum. There are 20 PRCA rodeo performances held in conjunction with musical entertainment from country, rock ’n’ roll and Latin artists, livestock auctions, carnival rides and retail outlets at the event. The volunteer organization raises funds for its scholarship program with proceeds from this event.
- In June, Shakespeare in the Park produces a Shakespeare play that is free to the public. The play is held at the San Antonio Botanical Garden.
- On June 19, African Americans in San Antonio celebrate Juneteenth on the city's East Side.
- The Texas Folklife Festival (TFF) held in June is a four-day cultural festival that brings more than 40 of Texas' ethnic groups together to showcase their authentic food, music, folk dancing and crafts. The first TFF was held in 1972 and was modeled after the Smithsonian Institution's Folklife Festival held in 1968 in Washington, D.C.
- The Tejano Music Awards, an awards ceremony dedicated to Tejano music, was held every March between 1980 and 2000. After several years in Eagle Pass, the annual event returned to the city in 2006.
- In 2008, San Japan, the city's first annual Japanese pop culture convention, began. In 2019, the three-day convention had an attendance of 20,107 people, making it the largest event of its type in the city.
- In 2009, San Antonio became the first U.S. city to sanction and sponsor an official Diwali celebration including a fireworks display and 5000 people in attendance. In 2011, attendance had increased to 15,000 people, showcasing Indian food, folk dances, and the first Zumba Bollywood - a dance/exercise routine to the tunes of Bollywood music. The event commemorates the Sister City Alliance that was established in 2008 between San Antonio and Chennai, India. "Diwali San Antonio" is celebrated annually on the first Saturday of November.
- Pride San Antonio is an annual LGBT event that attracts thousands in the San Antonio area.
- San Antonio Royal Steppaz is an African American trail riding group founded during the pandemic to connect members to nature and history.

== Cowboy culture ==
San Antonio is the birthplace of the American cowboy. Steer roping, bull riding, and busting broncos date back to the city's earliest days with vaqueros on the Mission ranches. In the past, when Spain ruled Texas, vaqueros (cowboys) filled Mission ranches to rope and round up cattle.

== Cuisine ==
Because of its ethnic and cultural diverse mix, San Antonio has a wide range of cuisines. One can find Mexican, African American, Italian, French, Spanish, Thai, Filipino, Vietnamese, Greek, Latin, German, Indian, Central and East Asian, Middle Eastern and Pacific Islander food throughout the city. San Antonio's long history and proximity to Mexico has endowed the area with an extensive variety of authentic Mexican and Tex Mex restaurants.

== Military ==
San Antonio has been a military city in the United States since Texas joined the union in 1845. Initially, it was a crucial staging point for the Mexican-American War offensive (1846–1848), and later it served as a critical supply depot. This military status was cemented between 1868 and 1883, when San Antonio donated the 90 acres of land just east of downtown that the US Army turned into Fort Sam Houston. The U.S. Armed Forces have numerous facilities in and around San Antonio; Joint Base San Antonio (JBSA) comprises Fort Sam Houston, which has Brooke Army Medical Center within it, the only one within the city limits, Lackland Air Force Base, the sole site for Air Force basic training, Randolph Air Force Base, pilot training, and Camp Bullis, ground training. Camp Stanley, storing and testing munitions, is not a part of JBSA and is just outside the city limits.

== Museums ==
- Artpace San Antonio is a residency, educational, and exhibition program that was opened in 1995. The foundation is housed in a renovated 1920s era Hudson Dealership building in Downtown San Antonio. The organization promotes itself as a laboratory for the advancement of international contemporary art. Artpace's primary focus is its International Artist-in-Residence program which annually invites nine artists to live and work in San Antonio to conceive and create art projects that are exhibited three times a year. A guest curator selects three artists, a Texan, one from another U.S. state, and one international to create new work while living at Artpace. In addition to these nine artist exhibits, Artpace has an additional four exhibitions a year.

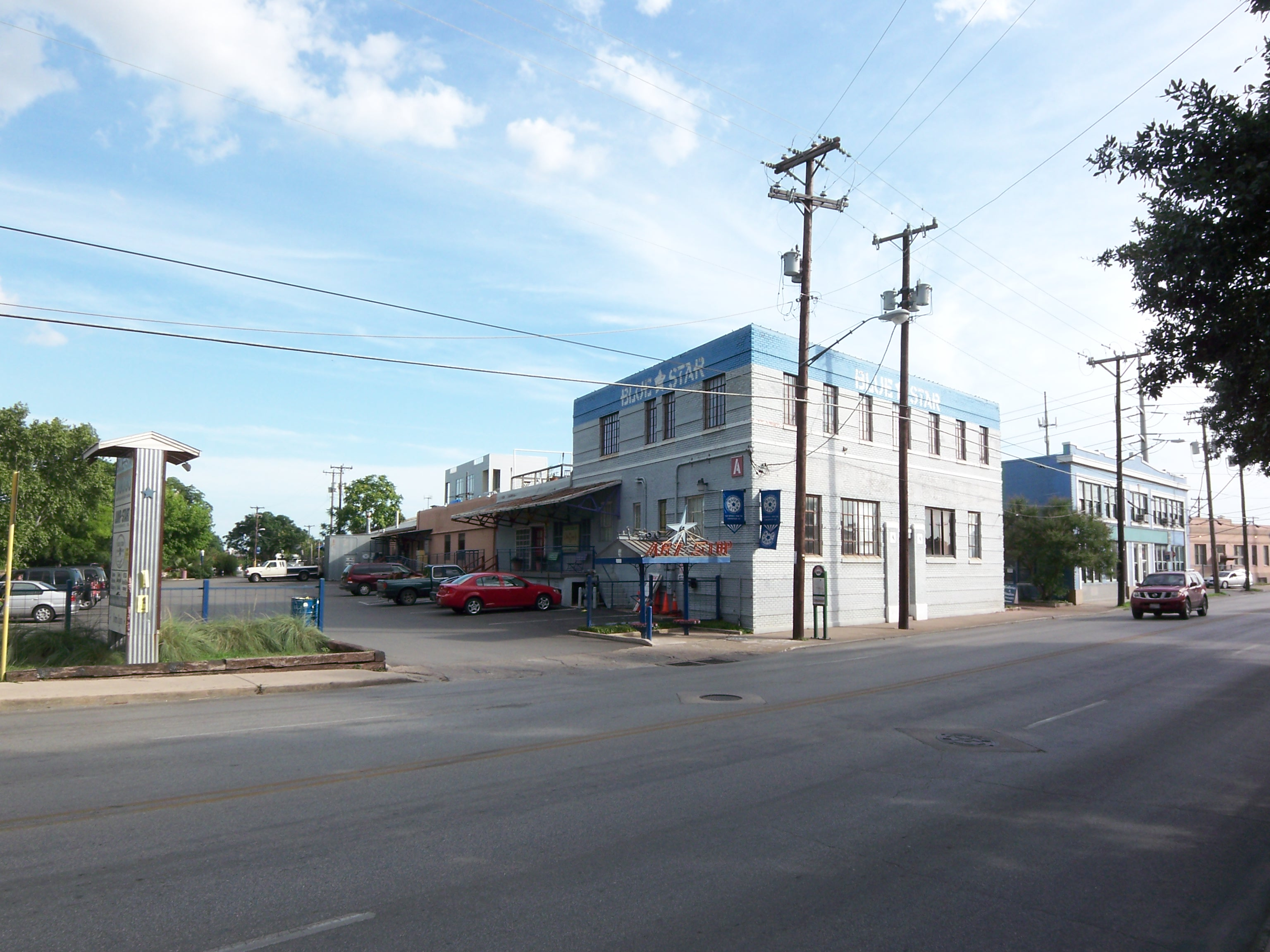
Blue Star Art Complex

- The Blue Star Contemporary Art Center (BSCAC) was established as a grassroots response to the cancellation of a contemporary arts exhibit at the San Antonio Museum of Art in 1985. The effort aimed to establish a venue for the exhibition of contemporary and new art in San Antonio. The center is housed in an adapted 1920s era warehouse facility located on the banks of the San Antonio River. The organization, which was originally operated by artists and volunteers and is now run by artist and director Bill FitzGibbons, was organized with a professional director and staff in 1988. Today the center has over 20 exhibitions each year that showcase local, regional, national and international artists. The facility in which the center is housed is now referred to as the Blue Star Complex and has been redeveloped as an arts-oriented mixed-use development that includes loft/studio apartments, galleries, retail, performance spaces, artists' work spaces, and design offices. BSCAC led the San Antonio's establishment of Contemporary Art Month held annually in July at over 70 venues.
- The Guadalupe Cultural Arts Center (GCAC), founded in 1980, is a nonprofit organization established for the promotion of the art and culture of Chicano, Latino and Indigenous peoples. The GCAC is located in the heart of San Antonio's west side, and its public and educational programming consists of varied programs in dance, literature, media arts, theater arts, visual arts and music. Annual events include the San Antonio CineFestival and the Tejano Conjunto Festival en San Antonio.
- The Institute of Texan Cultures opened as the Texas Pavilion at HemisFair '68, the 1968 World's Fair. The exhibit was well received and remained after the fair closed. Now a museum run by the University of Texas at San Antonio, it aims to promote better understanding of cultural history, science, and technology and their influence upon the people of Texas. The museum houses permanent exhibits on 26 ethnic and cultural groups, touring exhibits, publications, a library focusing on ethnic and cultural history, a historical photo collection of over 3 million images, outreach and education programs, and the annual Texas Folklife Festival.

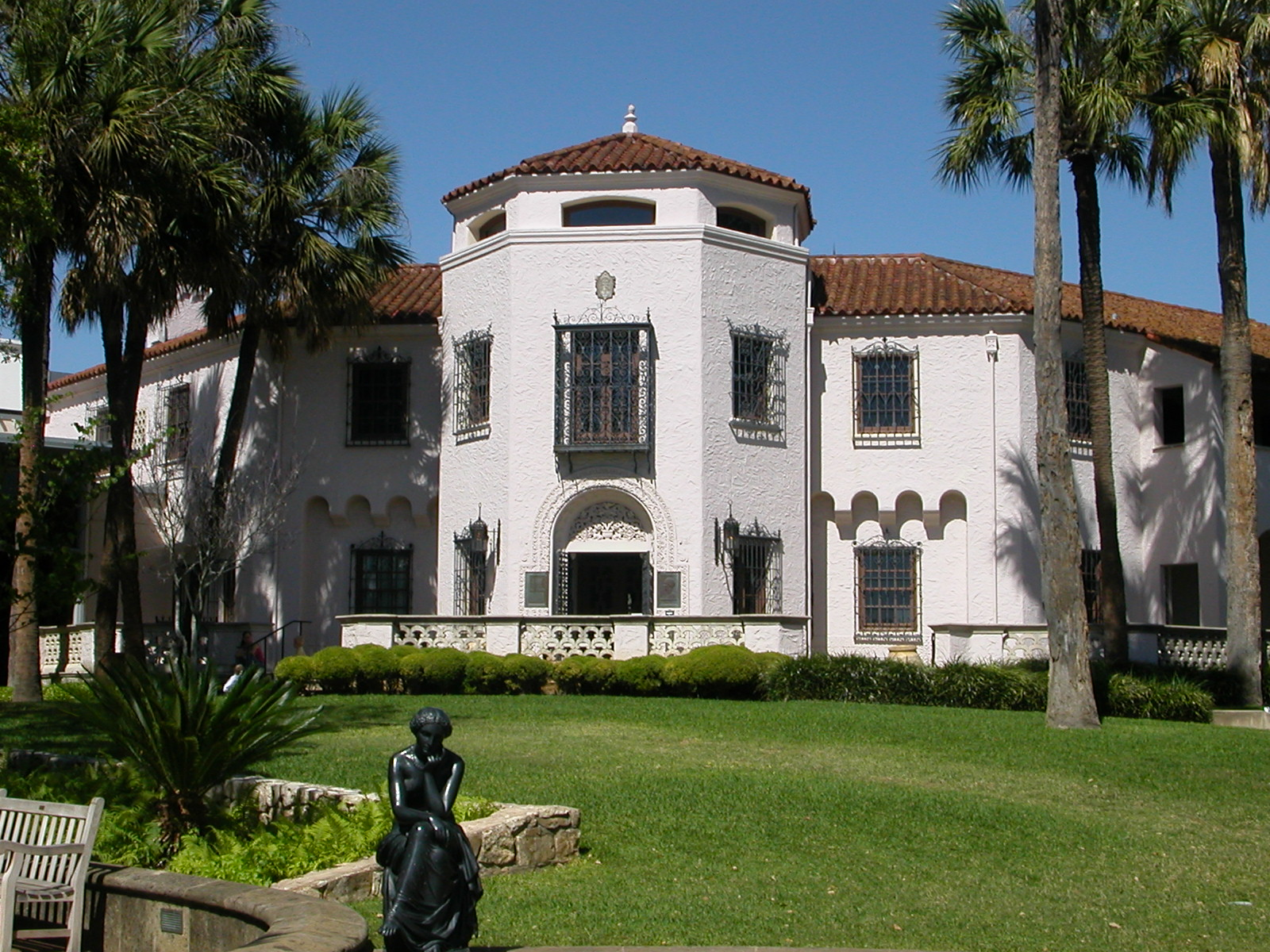
The McNay Art Museum

- The McNay Art Museum, founded in 1950, is the first modern art museum in Texas. The museum was created by Mrs. McNay's original bequest of most of her fortune, her art collection and her 24-room Spanish Colonial Revival-style mansion that sits on 23 acres (93,000 m^{2}) that are landscaped with fountains, broad lawns and a Japanese-inspired garden and fishpond. The museum focuses primarily on 19th and 20th century European and American art by such artists as Paul Cézanne, Pablo Picasso, Paul Gauguin, Henri Matisse, Georgia O'Keeffe, Diego Rivera, Mary Cassatt, and Edward Hopper. The collection today consists of over 14,000 objects of contemporary art and sculpture. The museum also is home to the Tobin Collection of Theater Arts, and a research library with over 30,000 volumes.
- The San Antonio African American Community Archive and Museum (SAAACAM) is a digital archive and museum located in the La Villita Historic Arts Village District near the San Antonio River Walk.

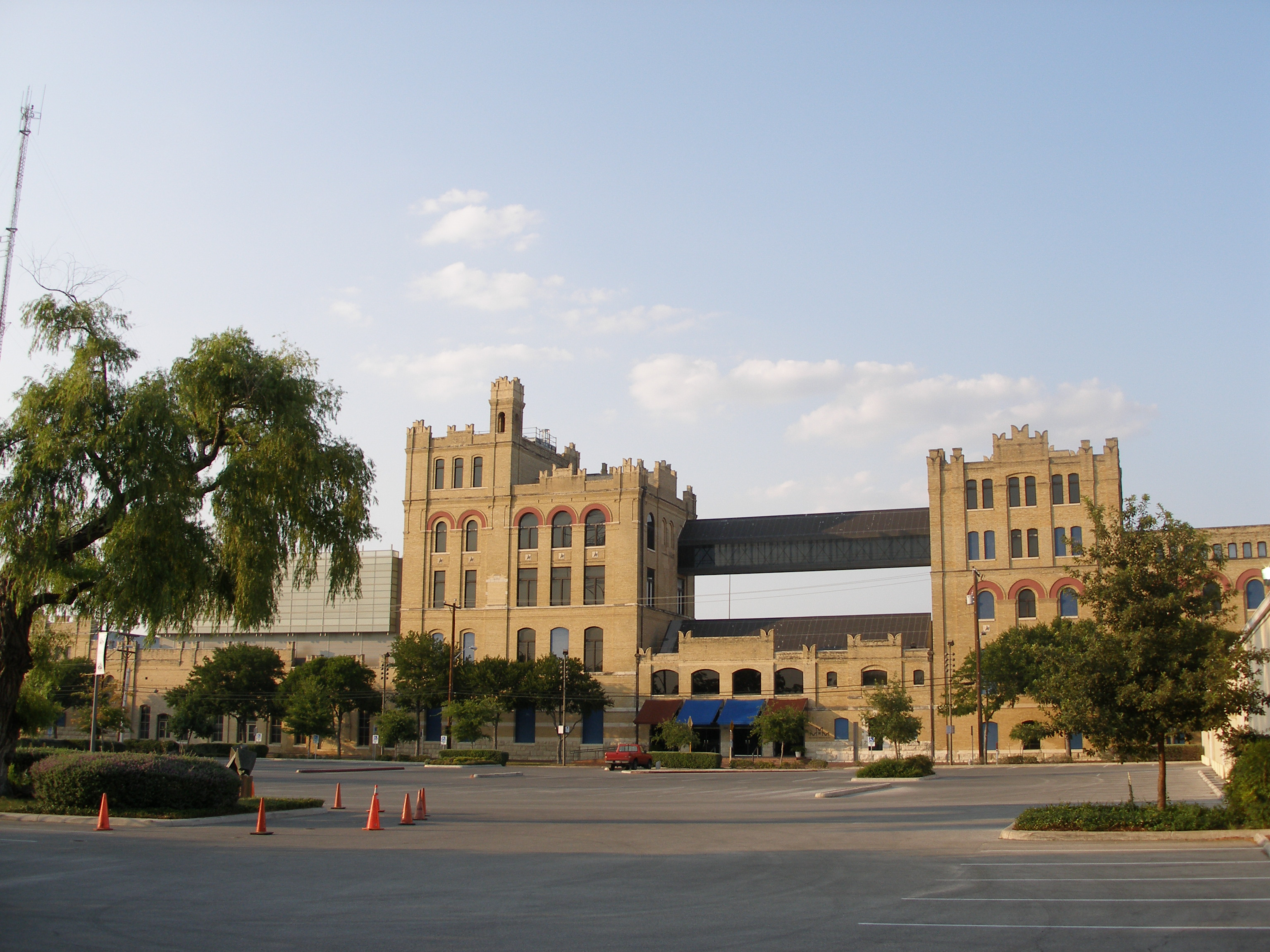
San Antonio Museum of Art

- The San Antonio Museum of Art is housed in the 1884 Lone Star Brewery and was opened in 1981. The building's renovation and adaptive reuse, designed by the Cambridge Seven Associates, has won several architectural awards. The building was placed on the U.S. National Register of Historic Places in 1972. The museum has over 30,000 objects in its collection, and maintains extensive collections of Asian art, Latin American art, and antiquities. Since opening in 1981 the museum has had three major expansions. The museum's collection also contains significant collections of American, European, Oceanic and contemporary art, from artists including Andy Warhol, John Singleton Copley, Diego Rivera, Wayne Thiebaud, Frank Stella, and Philip Guston.
- The Southwest School of Art, which has an annual enrollment of over 4000, is housed on the former site of an Ursuline convent and girls school built in 1848. The Ursuline campus is one of the earliest surviving examples of early French-influenced architecture in South Texas and includes a rare two-story "pisé de terre" (rammed earth) building. The campus and grounds are listed on the National Register of Historic Places. The school's Visitors Center Museum presents the 150-year history of the site. Contemporary exhibitions, about eight per year, are presented in the 3,500-foot (1,100 m) Russell Hill Rogers Gallery on the Navarro Campus and feature national, regional, and local artists whose work reflects the school's curriculum.
- The Witte Museum, established in 1926 under the charter of the San Antonio Museum Association, is located within Brackenridge Park on the banks of the San Antonio River and aims to promote the history, science, and culture of the region. The collection represents ethnography, decorative arts and textiles, and science. The primary focus of the museum is natural sciences with emphasis on South Texas and the history of Texas and the Southwestern United States.
- The Texas Transportation Museum is a small museum that has information about railways that served Texas. They also have a model railroad club and a garden layout.
- The San Antonio Buckhorn Saloon & Museum, established in 1881, is located on the corner of Houston and Navarro street. The museum includes a taxidermied wing, that holds birds, big cats, reptiles, and large mammals. It also has a wax museum attached entitled the Halls of Texas History. In the saloon visitors can meet with cowboys as they tell stories, with food served from a western setting.

== Nightlife ==
San Antonio's nightlife culture has grown to become one of the highly prominent in the United States. The River Walk, or Paseo del Rio as it's known in Spanish, is the city's central entertainment district. It is home to several nightclubs, pubs, bars and restaurants. Also in Downtown, there are several lounges, restaurants and bars.

Downtown San Antonio at night

The Strip (north of Downtown) houses a concentration of clubs and bars catering to the LGBT community. Located on Main Street near San Antonio College, they include Sparky's Pub, Luther's Café, The Silver Dollar Saloon, Pegasus, and HEAT. A block from The Strip are The Saint and Essence. In the St. Mary's Strip, several bars and restaurants can be found, as well as the Josephine Theater, which since 1995 has been home to the Josephine Theatrical Company, a non-profit resident theater group. The theater originally opened in 1947 as an Art Deco style neighborhood movie house.

San Antonio's largest university, the University of Texas at San Antonio, is located on the far northwest side of the city.

On the first Friday of every month, the area immediately south of Downtown known as Southtown or the King William District hosts an art walk known as First Friday. Galleries, art spaces and vintage stores participate, and street vendors sell art and jewelry, with live music played in the streets. Events vary from month to month, and no charge is made for admission.

Second Saturday is usually on the following weekend after First Friday but sometimes falls on the very next day. Second Saturday is a monthly showcase of the area commonly known as SoFlo (an abbreviation for the South Flores street where it is located) also known as the Lone Star District (named after the cross-street LoneStar Blvd. where the Lone Star Brewing Company once stood.) The area is a few blocks South of the Blue Star District. Once a year in the Fall, the S.M.A.R.T fair is an annual festival held to support the various arts in San Antonio.

== Performing arts ==
- The Alameda Theater is an ornate movie theater which opened in 1949, and was the largest theater in the U.S. dedicated to Spanish-language entertainment. The theater is often referred to as the "Latin Apollo Theater" and is known for the house's extensive black lighted murals. Today the theater, in association with the Smithsonian Institution and the John F. Kennedy Center for the Performing Arts, is the performing arts component of the National Association of Latino Arts and Culture, which was formally organized in 2001. Upon completion of the theater's renovation, it will be capable of housing performing arts mediums such as television and full Broadway productions, theater, opera, dance, concerts and film.

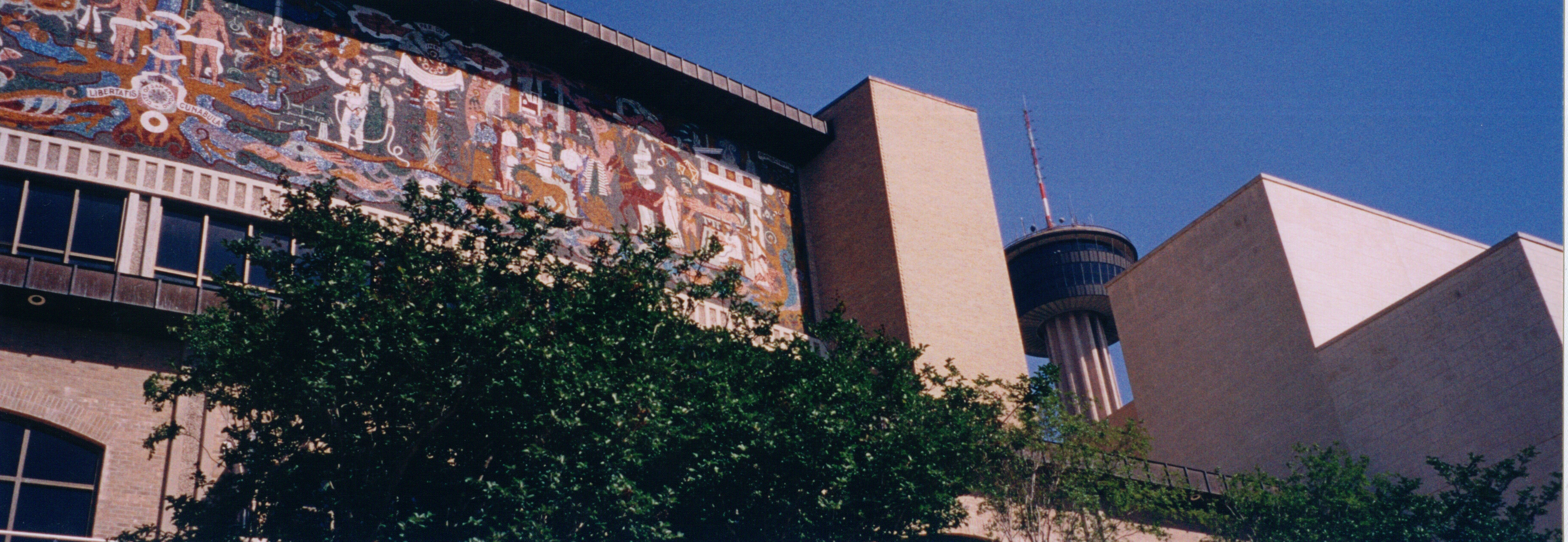
In the foreground the Lila Cockrell Theater and its Juan O'Gorman mosaic Confluence of Civilizations in the Americas, and in the background the Tower of the Americas

- The Lila Cockrell Theatre, opened in 1968 as part of the HemisFair '68, is a performing arts venue that hosts ballet, opera, theater and individual concert events. The building is on the banks of the River Walk, and being a part of the adjacent convention center it also hosts general assembly and multi-media presentation events. There is a Juan O'Gorman mosaic mural located on the exterior facade entitled "Confluence of Civilizations in the Americas." The mural symbolizes the progress made by the confluence of civilizations in the Western Hemisphere, starting with Adam and Eve in the center, with European civilization depicted to the right, and indigenous Mesoamerican civilization to the left.
- The Majestic Theatre is home to the San Antonio Symphony, individual concerts and touring Broadway shows. The John Eberson-designed theater, which opened in 1929 as a movie palace with Mediterranean-style architecture and a ceiling painted with a night sky, with projected clouds that move across the ceiling. The theater is a Recorded Texas Historic Landmark and was listed on the National Register of Historical Places in 1975.
- The Charline McCombs Empire Theatre, which opened in 1913, is the sister theater to the Majestic and hosts smaller productions, banquets, cabaret, chamber orchestras and touring plays. Renovation of the Empire was completed in 1989 and combined backstage areas with the adjacent Majestic, which was designed for more flexibility between the two venues. The Empire was listed on the National Register of Historic Places in 1999.
- The Guadalupe Cultural Arts Center, was founded in 1980 as a nonprofit, multidisciplinary organization. Located at the heart of San Antonio's west side, the Guadalupe is the largest community-based, multidisciplinary organization in the United States. The Guadalupe presents and produces annual seasons of events, exhibitions, and festivals, including the San Antonio Cinefestival, the Tejano Conjunto Festival en San Antonio, Hecho a Mano/Made by Hand, a season of plays by the resident youth theater company Groupo Animo, and productions featuring the Guadalupe Dance Company. Each of the six programs offer instructional classes including creative writing, button accordion and Baile Folklorico.
- San Antonio is home to the Crossmen Drum and Bugle Corps, a drum corps belonging to the Drum Corps International competition circuit. The Crossmen compete in the World Class division of DCI. San Antonio also hosts a major event of the DCI circuit, DCI Southwestern Championships, which is a frequent stop for most DCI World Class drum corps and many Open Class drum corps.

== Tourism ==
Tourism has been an important part of San Antonio almost as long as the military has. As early as 1877, with the arrival of the railroad to San Antonio, there were reports of the unique, "exotic" culture in San Antonio. These reports were referring to Hispanics (Tejanos) who had been pushed by the dominant Germans (south and east San Antonio) and Anglos (north San Antonio) from the city's mainstream into the impoverished West Side - where there were feasts and fiestas, cockfights, and dancing. Some call this an early example of cultural appropriation, analogous to the relationship of Manhattan to Harlem. Urban designer Frederick Law Olmsted called San Antonio touristic gold, with its "jumble of races, costumes, languages and building." And Mark Twain designated it as one of four unique American cities (also Boston, New Orleans, and San Francisco) because of its cultural melting pot, preserved history, and distinct identity. San Antonio houses many tourist attractions, such as the San Antonio Aquarium, San Antonio Zoo, SeaWorld, and Six Flags Fiesta Texas. San Antonio's Spanish influence can be seen in the many historic sites across the city, such as the Alamo Mission, Mission Concepción, San Antonio River Walk, Mission San Francisco de la Espada, and Cathedral of San Fernando (San Antonio).

== See also ==
- Artist Foundation of San Antonio
- Puroslam
- San Antonio Symphony
- San Antonio Japanese Tea Garden
- Temple Beth-El (San Antonio, Texas)
- University of Texas at San Antonio
- University of Texas at San Antonio Libraries (UTSA Libraries)
- Youth Orchestras of San Antonio
