= Creighton Michael =

American abstract artist

- Born: 1949 (age 76–77); Knoxville, Tennessee, US
- Education: Washington University in St. Louis; Vanderbilt University; University of Tennessee
- Known for: Installation art, sculpture painting, drawing, printmaking
- Awards: Pollock-Krasner Foundation; New York Foundation for the Arts; Edward F. Albee Foundation
- Website: Creighton Michael

Creighton Michael, SquiggleTenri, graphite and paper coated rope, 48" x 144" x 5", 2005, Tenri Institute, New York City.

Creighton Michael (born 1949) is an American abstract artist known for his cross-medium style of work. He produces sculptures, paintings, drawings and installations noted for their distinctive use of structure and line as well as for their conceptual content, which centers on questions of nature, perception and visual language, among others. Many of his works call attention to and subvert the traditional distinctions between two- and three-dimensional artwork, or challenge convention in other ways. According to critic Robert Morgan of Sculpture, "Michael pursues art as a series of ideas that carry a material destiny, an object form derived from drawing."

Michael's work is held in the public collections of the Metropolitan Museum of Art, National Gallery of Art, Brooklyn Museum, and Phillips Collection, among others. He has exhibited at venues including the Queens Museum, High Museum of Art, Stedelijk Museum Amsterdam and SculptureCenter. He is based in the lower Hudson Valley of New York and is a member of American Abstract Artists in New York City.

== Life and career ==
Michael was born in 1949 in Knoxville, Tennessee. He completed a BFA in painting from the University of Tennessee in 1971 and an MA in art history from Vanderbilt University in 1976. In 1978, he earned an MFA in painting and multimedia from Washington University in St. Louis and then moved to New York City. He relocated to the Hudson Valley in 1990.

Michael has had solo exhibitions organized by the High Museum (1987), Katonah Museum of Art (1995; 2017), Queens Museum (1999), Neuberger Museum of Art (2001), Mint Museums (2005), and Hafnarborg (Reykjavík, 2008), among others. He appeared in surveys including "Constructed Image, Constructed Object" (The Alternative Museum, 1984); "The Sculptural Membrane" (SculptureCenter, 1986); and "Splendor of Dynamic Structure" (Herbert F. Johnson Museum, 2011).

== Work and reception ==
Michael's oeuvre spans several decades and falls into distinct bodies of work that range across media. Observers have noted an investigative quality in his art whereby viewers' attention is drawn to conceptual points of conflict or interest, along which lines the works are often grouped. Nature features prominently in Michael's artwork, as do schemas that focus on structure and convention together with their subversion. According to critics, Michael evokes ideas through the use of visual language elements that he deploys in novel ways. Writing for Art in America, Jonathan Goodman stated, "Michael explores a visual idiom that refracts nature as an ongoing process."

Of particular note are ways in which Michael's work is seen to challenge dimensional perception and visual convention. Some of his sculptures embody the formal attributes of line drawing in an approach that commentators have likened to drawing in three dimensions. Others are paired with flat visuals in a manner that blurs the dimensional distinction—by manipulating perspective, through the use of trompe-l'œil, via the strategic use of shadow, or by other means. Some of his work explores the introduction of time as a fourth dimension.

Some of the concepts in Michael's work appear in contrasting pairs. Grids and templates are a recurring form and are set variously against meandering doodles, random deviation, and improvised participation—pairings which contrast the rigidity of systems with the organic entropy of life. Other pairings include growth versus decay, pause versus flow, intimacy versus detachment and structure versus instability.

Art historical influences in Michael's work vary widely. Critics have cited the works of surrealism, van Gogh and Francis Bacon, all of which have been recognized by the artist. Others have linked his work with abstract expressionism, with one observer likening his sculpture to a three-dimensional analog of abstract expressionist action paintings.

=== Early sculpture ===
Creighton Michael, Trench, plywood, paper, charcoal and acrylic, 5 objects each approx. 60" high, 1985.

Throughout the 1980s, Michael exhibited almost exclusively as a sculptor, gaining recognition for objects that critics described as unique and defiant of sculptural norms. He was part of an emerging generation of artists that introduced elements from drawing and painting into abstract sculpture—symbolism, personal reference, representational illusion and the subconscious—creating neo-constructivist works that were intuitive and surreal rather than monumental and comprehensible.

Michael's early sculptures were made largely of recycled paper, rubber and wood and provoked associations with archaic armor and weaponry, tribal relics, and natural forms like shells and cocoons. The linear, elongated forms of the "Punch" series (1982) and the architectonic "Traveler" works (1982–4) resembled hides stretched over skeletal armatures that were appended with additional shapes; the wall-mounted Trench (1985) comprised five, large mask-like forms. These works conveyed ideas through their use of shape, scale, surface, detail and unusual positioning, calling into question relationships between human and object, and perception and the irrational. In the subsequent "Widsith," "Navigator" and "Consort" series, Michael shifted toward a more idiosyncratic vocabulary that Arts Magazine critic Ellen Handy deemed "stubbornly eccentric … independent, mute and insistent about its thing–ness [or] 'materiality'." Combining wing- or sail-like slabs of paper or fabric, projecting strands of curved wood and an active use of void areas, these works were likened to experimental drawings in space. George Melrod of ARTnews wrote that Michael "merged the linear delicacy of a draughtsman with a quirky sense of form."

Michael would return to these forms for a collaborative public installation with light-work artist Bill FitzGibbons, EELight (2007), which critics described as a minimalist, blue, room-sized simulation of an aquarium, visible around-the-clock at street-level in midtown Manhattan.

=== 1990s cross-media series: drawing, sculpture, painting ===
In the 1990s, Michael produced bodies of work that cut across media—sculpture, drawing and painting—and investigated specific themes such as landscape, patterning, gesture and mark-making. His embrace of other media coincided with his move to rural country, inspiring the drawing series "Navigator," "Water Music," "Dart," "Aquifer" and "Edge." These series merged abstraction and representation, delicate line and bold form, and accretive mark-making and erasure while exploring themes involving conflict and resolution in nature.

Whereas many artists use drawings largely as preparatory materials, Michael often creates three-dimensional works whose forms he reworks on paper. His stark, wall-mounted "Conifer" sculptures (1992) each consisted of a bundle of blackened, gleaned branches set against a wedge of framed translucent rice paper, fusing natural and artificial forms. He revisited these motifs in his exhibition, "Landscape" (Katonah Museum of Art, 1995), sketching unconventional views of wintry settings in paintings, abstract sculpture, and the "Conifer" drawings: tight, panoramic slices of pine trees, whose spiky branches and thrusting, intertwined forms suggested the violent, sexual physicality of nature. Relating the museum's exterior and interior, the low-lying, outdoor "Vectors" sculptures employed skeletal arrangements of black, pipe-like cylinders that the vastness of landscape and evoked bare branches. The "Teahouse" sculptures (1995) made a similar use of large, open frameworks of steel rods and contours of wood to imply biomorphic shapes, weight and mass in negative space; critics likened both series to works that "drew in space" by David Smith, Martin Puryear, Ellsworth Kelly and Alexander Calder.

Creighton Michael, Field 2703, oil on linen on convex panel, 36" x 34" x 2.5", 2003. Collection: Progressive Corporation.

Michael's exhibitions "Vantage" (1998) and "Haiku/Innuendo" (Neuberger Museum of Art, 2001) focused on largely abstract oil paintings and drawings reflecting an engagement with complexities and transformation in nature, incidental patterns and nebulous spaces. In the red, sepia and buff-colored Dust, Haiku and Innuendo paintings, he used complexes of mark-making and looping, linear patterning to generate tonal fields that reviewers related to works by Rothko and Monet's late paintings of water. Michael's paintings were inspired by phenomena like mold stains, the aquatic growth of duckweed or ripples in a pond, and in execution, evoked microscopic and macroscopic worlds of cells, ice filigree, flower blossoms, sea coral, clouds and galaxies. His "Rhapsody" drawings (1998–01) were inspired by van Gogh's pen and ink works, which forged independent, pointillist marks into patterns and images. In Michael's process-driven series, he stitched together discrete episodes of varying, minimal mark-making to create dense, sometimes snaking compositions.

=== Later work: "dimensional drawings" and paintings ===
In the subsequent two decades, Michael produced diverse bodies of work that built off one another and systematically investigated various processes and ideas, as reflected in his 2003 retrospective "Dialectics of Line." These series were united by their explorations of mark and gesture in two- and three-dimensional space, which made connections to abstract expressionism, minimalism, conceptualism and the music of John Cage), as well as to cave paintings, calligraphy, musical scoring and other forms of notation. The work often counteracts the intimacy of personal mark-making with intentional means of disengagement. This may occur through a systematized process in the artmaking process—as in the "Ply" (2008) and "Palimpsest" (2012–13) paintings or "Script" (2014–5) and "Chronicle" (2016–18) drawings—or through collaborations in which Michael cedes aspects of artistic decision-making to installers, composers, printmakers, videographers, audiences (e.g. his "dimensional drawings," 2002–21).

Michael's "Rhapsody" works on paper directly influenced his hybrid "dimensional drawings"—drawing-sculpture installations that New York Times critic D. Dominick Lombardi wrote, "expand the preconceived notion of what drawings are and what they can become." The "Grid" (2002–07) and "Dips" (2002–03) series emphasized pattern, color, texture and prominent shadow. They consisted of bent arcs of pliable wire, staple-like shapes or dowels modeled with paper, graphite and acrylic, which were inserted intuitively into gallery walls inscribed with light grids and drilled holes. In some exhibitions, Michael encouraged variation by having other people install the pieces, directed by schematics (sometimes displayed alongside) that dictated the grid but only partially indicated placement of the elements.

Creighton Michael, Chronicle 916, layered acrylic and digital transfer on tapered panel, 36" x 24" x 2", 2016.

The "Squiggle" and "Scribble" (2003–20) dimensional drawings emphasize gesture, motion and humor. They consist of twisting pieces of pulp-and-graphite-coated rope affixed to supports and seem to hover in space in counterpoint to ghostly, sinuous shadow forms (e.g., SquiggleTenri, 2005). Lilly Wei wrote of them: "a cross between drawing and writing, they recall unruly, doodled lines that have escaped the confines of paper … as if they were the detritus of drawing." In 2008, Michael created a 3,000-square-foot, 85-unit "squiggle" work, the floor installation Rhapsody Floor Horizon (Hafnarborg), which was inspired by the moss and cairns found in the Icelandic landscape.

Michael's "Squiggles" relate to both his earlier "Field" (2002–08) paintings and later "Syntax," "Script" and "Chronicle" drawings (2014–18). The "Field" paintings are oil-on-linen works mounted on convex surfaces, lending them a sculptural presence. They feature bright, psychedelic-style overlays and networks of color composed of different types of line that create optical, high-density effects (e.g., Field 2703, 2003). The three drawing series layer tapestry-like distillations of illegible middle-eastern language forms based on a corrupted computer-image pattern (Chronicle 916, 2016); selected for their calligraphic and associational qualities, they form visual idioms that Michael has extended dimensionally in installations, and temporally, in the video collaborations Shadows Trilogy and Double Dutch (2014–15).

== Collections and recognition ==
Michael's work is held in the public collections of the Allentown Art Museum, Brooklyn Museum, Cleveland Museum of Art, Delaware Art Museum, Denver Art Museum, Hafnarfjördur Centre of Culture and Fine Art (Iceland), High Museum of Art, Knoxville Museum of Art, McNay Art Museum, Memphis Brooks Museum of Art, Metropolitan Museum of Art, Mint Museum, National Gallery of Art, Neuberger Museum of Art, Phillips Collection, RISD Museum, U.S. Department of State, and Yale University Art Gallery, among others.

Michael has received a Pollock-Krasner Foundation grant, a New York Foundation for the Arts fellowship in sculpture, a Sam & Adele Golden Foundation for the Arts award in painting, and an Edward F. Albee Foundation fellowship.

== Other professional activities ==
Michael was on the art faculty at Rhode Island School of Design, Pennsylvania Academy of the Fine Arts, and Hunter College in New York City and was a visiting lecturer at Princeton University.

He has been a curator/producer for shows including: "Blurring Boundaries: The Women of American Abstract Artists, 1936—Present" (Ewing Gallery of Art and Architecture, University of Tennessee/Murray State University, touring, 2020–23); "Uncharted: American Abstraction in the Information Age" (Hofstra University Art Museum, 2020); "The Art of Rube Goldberg" (International Arts & Artists, touring, 2017–20); the "Pencil Pushed: Exploring Process and Boundaries in Drawing" (Ewing Gallery, 2012).
