= St Mary's Street =

St Marys Street may refer to:

- The St. Mary's Strip in San Antonio, Texas, U.S.
- Saint Mary's Street station, in Massachusetts, U.S.
  - Boston University Central station, formerly known as Saint Mary's Street
- St Mary's Street, Cambridge
- St. Mary's Street, Cardiff
- St Mary's Street, Edinburgh, formerly known as Leith Wynd, the original main route from Edinburgh to the Port of Leith
