= Jerome K. Harris Jr. =

- Born: June 26, 1931; San Antonio, Bexar County, Texas, USA
- Died: November 4, 2013 (aged 82)
- Occupation(s): Businessman, Civic Leader
- Known for: Founder of Harris Shop of Pappagallo, Co-founder of Cody-Harris Photography
- Spouses: Susan Elizabeth Passmore (first wife); Susan W. Harris (second wife)
- Children: Rome Harris (Jerome K. Harris III); Nancy Nash; Laurie Harris; Marjorie Morgan
- Parents: Jerome K. Harris Sr.; Gertrude Louise Harris
- Relatives: Marjory Jean Harris (sister)

Jerome K. Harris Jr. (June 26, 1931 – November 4, 2013) was an American businessman who helped to promote Hemisfair '68.

== Early life ==
Jerome K. Harris Jr. was born on June 26, 1931, in San Antonio, Texas, to Jerome K. Harris Sr., originator of the idea for Hemisfair '68, and Gertrude Louise Harris. His sister was Marjory Jean Harris. He overcame significant early challenges, being the sole survivor among four children at Alamo Heights High School who contracted polio at the time.

== Career and civic engagement ==
Harris began his entrepreneurial journey with the Harris Shop of Pappagallo, later co-founding Cody-Harris Photography. He was a notable civic leader, holding positions such as president of the San Antonio Rotary, San Antonio Fiesta Commission, vice president of the American Heart Association, and was actively involved in many other civic organizations. He also played a pivotal role in promoting HemisFair '68.

== Legacy ==
Harris died on November 4, 2013, at 82. His enduring impact is reflected in the civic projects he supported and his family's continued dedication to social entrepreneurship and community service.
