= HemisFair =

Hemisfair may refer to:

- HemisFair Arena, an indoor arena located in San Antonio, Texas
- HemisFair '68, the official 1968 World's Fair (or International Exposition) held in San Antonio, Texas, from April 6 through October 6, 1968
