= Texas Folklife Festival =

Annual festival held in San Antonio, Texas, U.S.

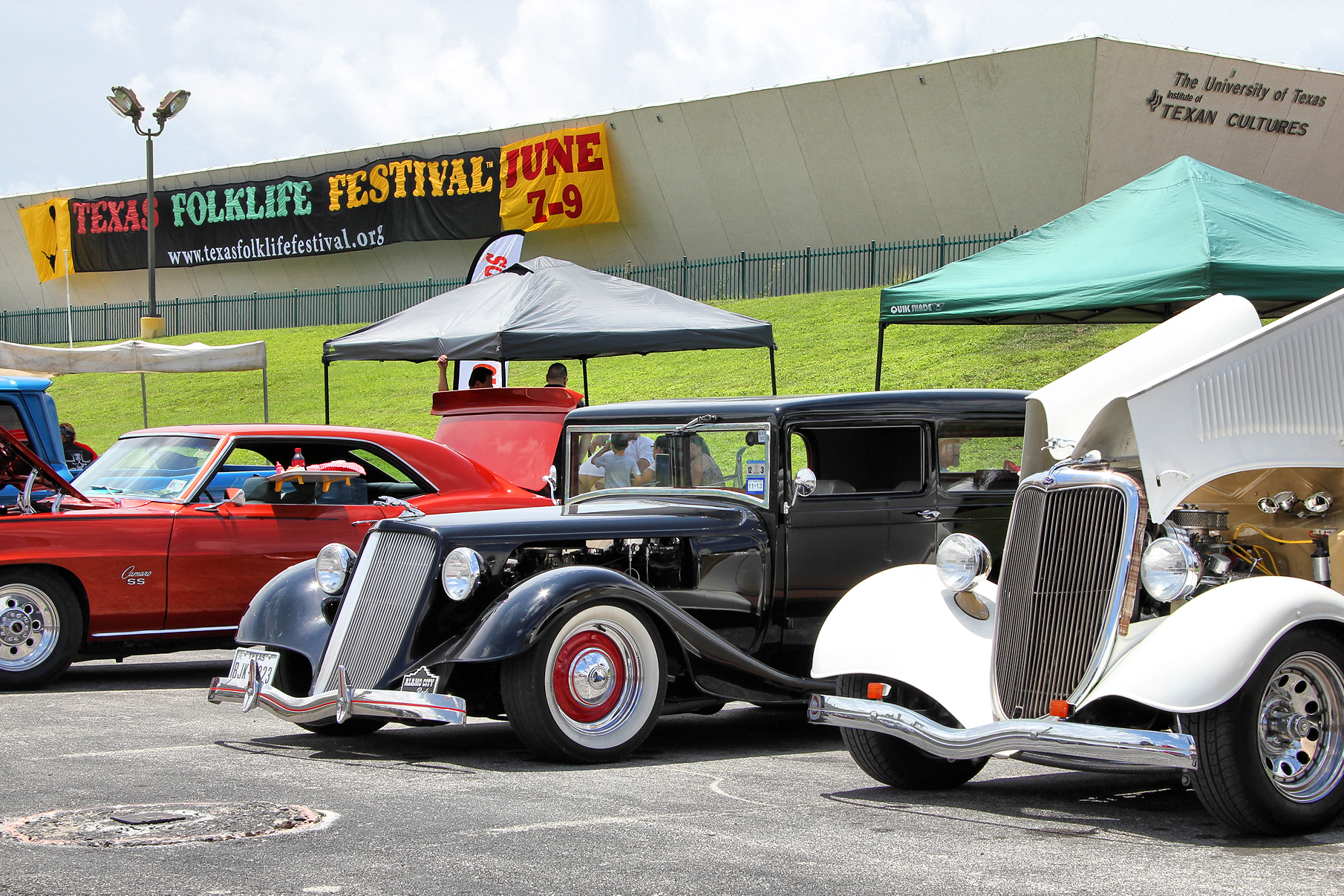
Alamo City Rods custom cars on display at the 42nd Texas Folklife Festival in 2013.

The Texas Folklife Festival is an annual event sponsored by the University of Texas at San Antonio's Institute of Texan Cultures celebrating the many ethnicities represented in the population of the state of Texas. The first Texas Folklife Festival was held from September 7–10, 1972. The event moved to August a few years after it began and then to June a few years later to avoid the hottest part of summer in Texas. The Festival is held in Downtown San Antonio at the Institute of Texan Cultures on UTSA's HemisFair Park Campus, located at the corner of Bowie Street and Cesar Chavez Boulevard, just off Interstate 37 South.

The Texas Folklife Festival was modeled after the Smithsonian Folklife Festival, which was first held in Washington, D.C. in 1967. On behalf of the Institute of Texan Cultures (which was built as the Texas Pavilion for HemisFair '68, the 1968 World’s Fair), O.T. Baker attended the first Smithsonian Folklife Festival and returned home with plans to replicate the event in San Antonio. Now, thousands attend the three-day event each year, which features food, crafts, music and dances from ethnic groups that immigrated to Texas.

Some of the proceeds from the event are given back to the participating cultures so their customs would continue to stay alive and be passed on to future generations. The event’s focus also directly correlates to the mission of the Institute of Texan Cultures.

Claudia Ball took over from O. T. Baker as festival director in 1976 and served in that capacity through 1980. Jo Ann Andera became festival director in 1981 and continues to serve in that capacity. O.T. Baker (1910-2006), the Festival’s founder and director from 1972–75, died on January 21, 2006.

No festival was held in 2020.

== Gallery ==
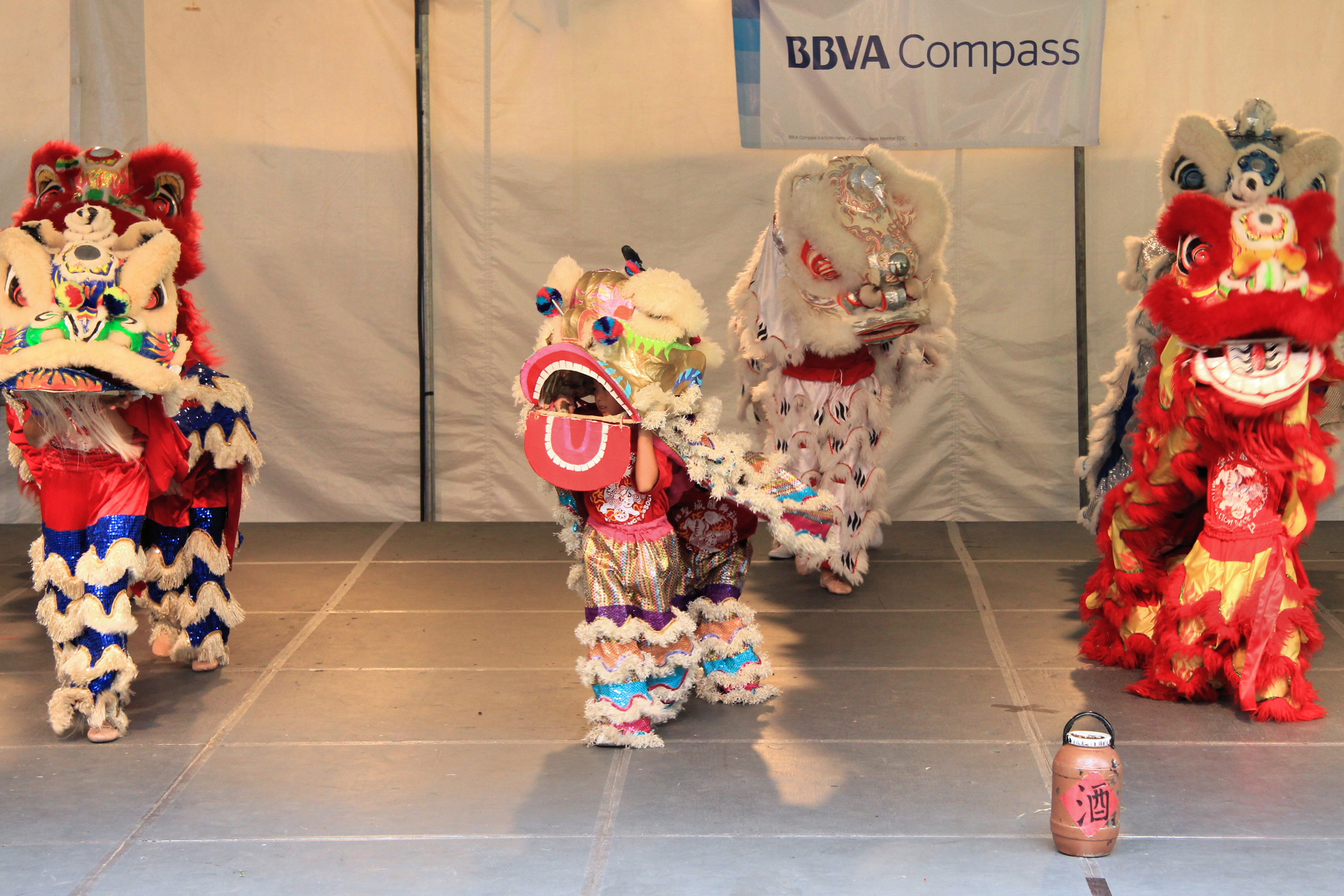
San Antonio Lion Dance Association

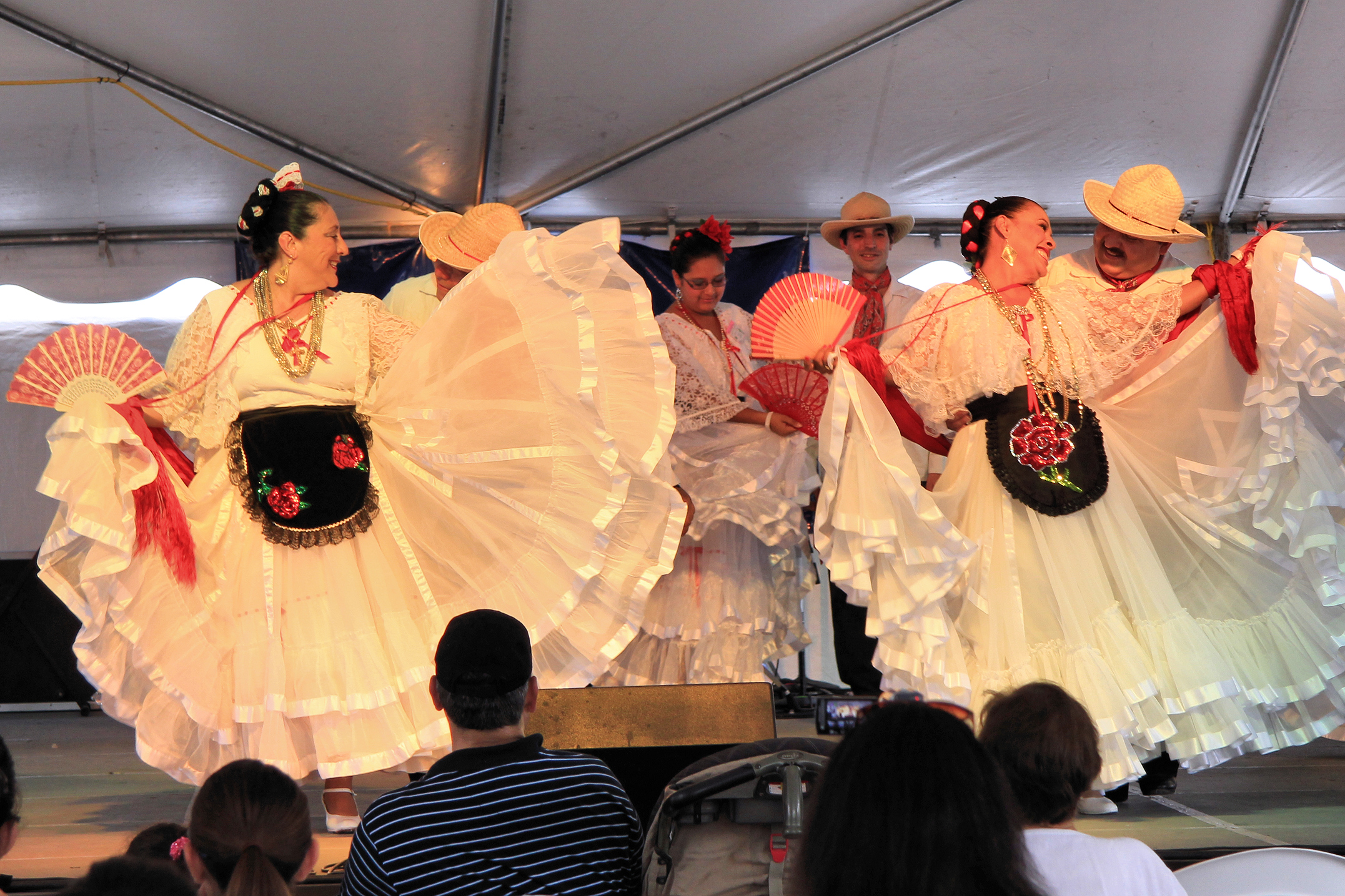
Ballet Folklorico

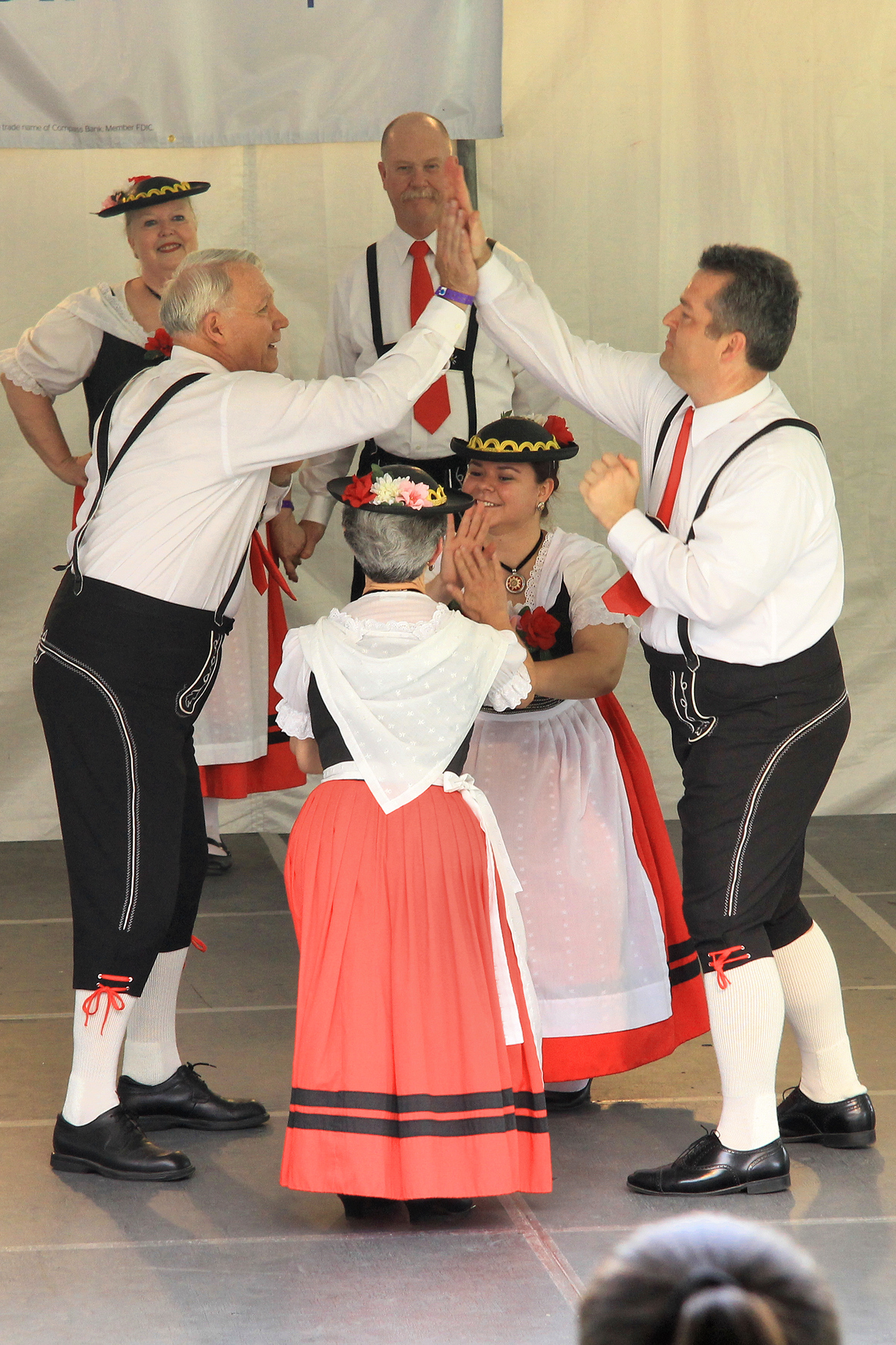
German Folkdancers of San Antonio

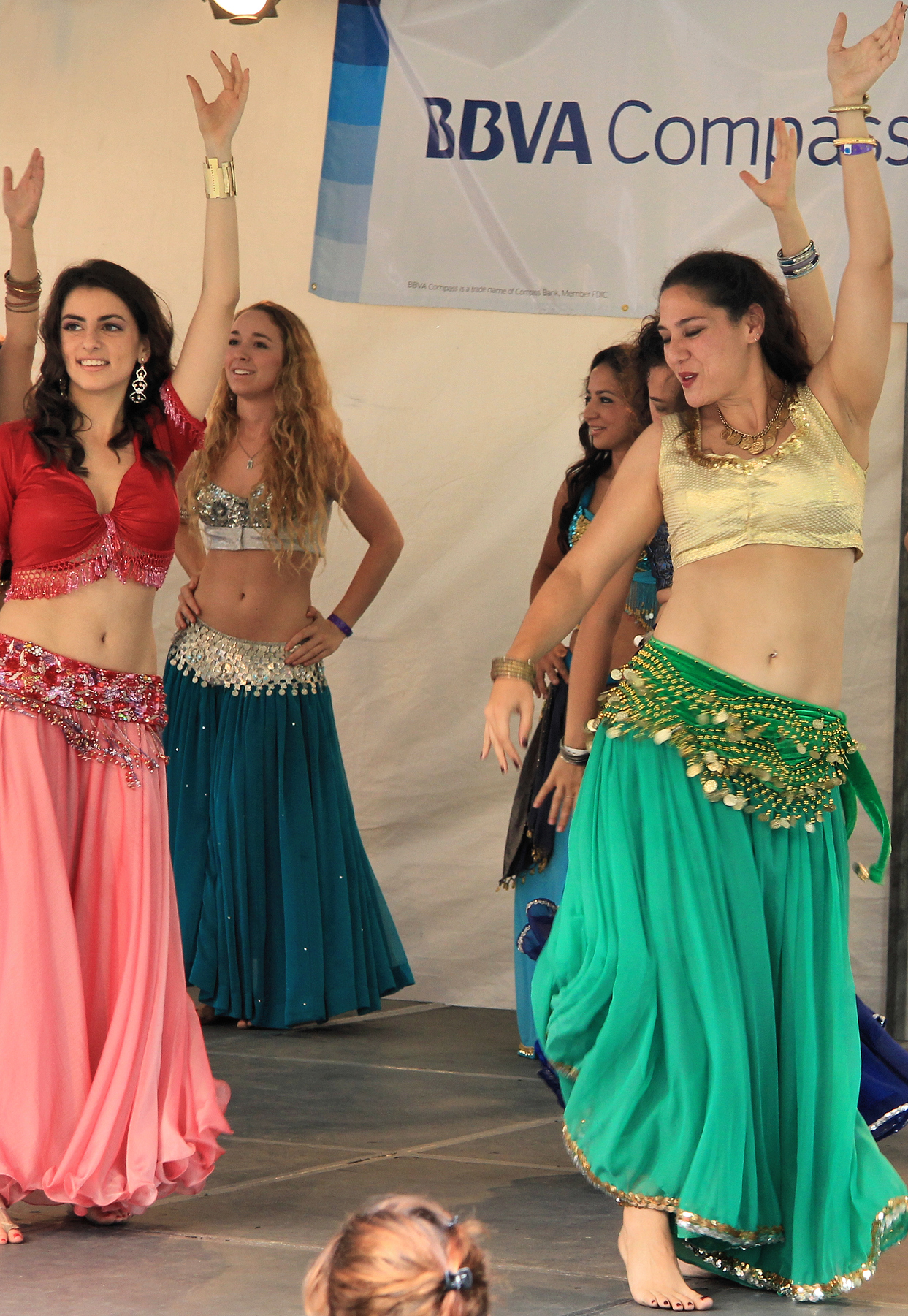
Lebanese Folk Dancers of St. George Maronite Catholic Church

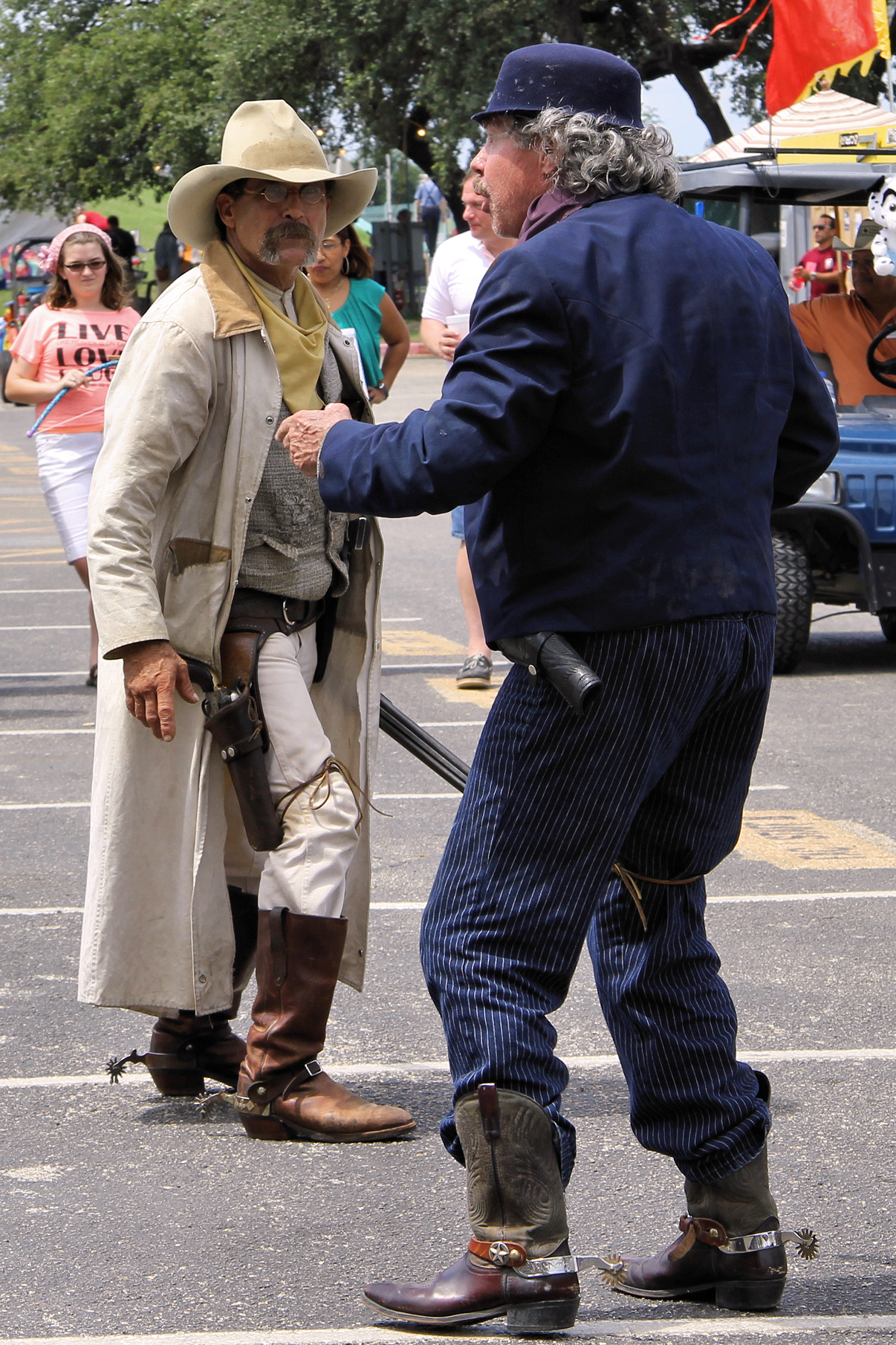
South Texas Gunfighters

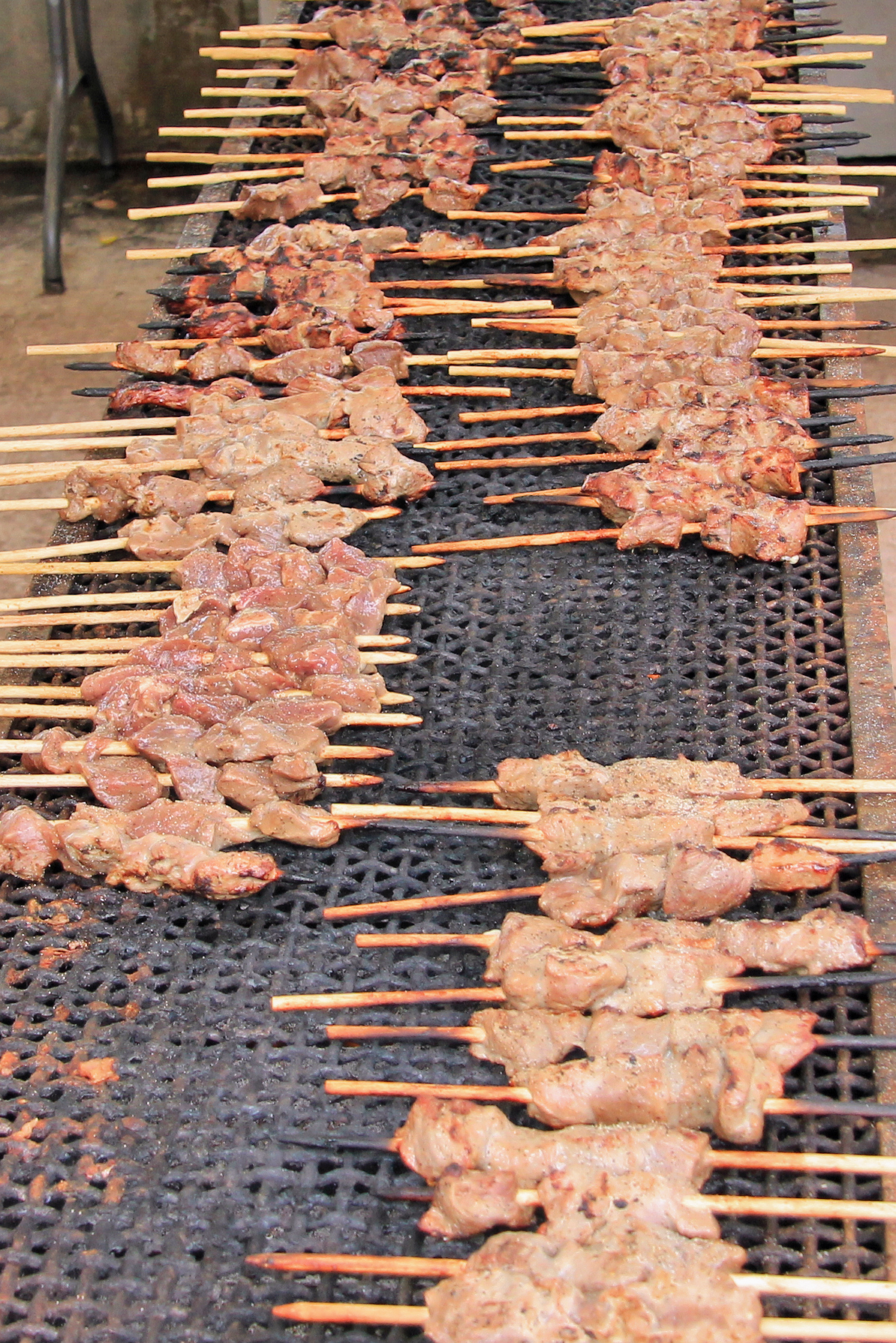
Shish-kabobs

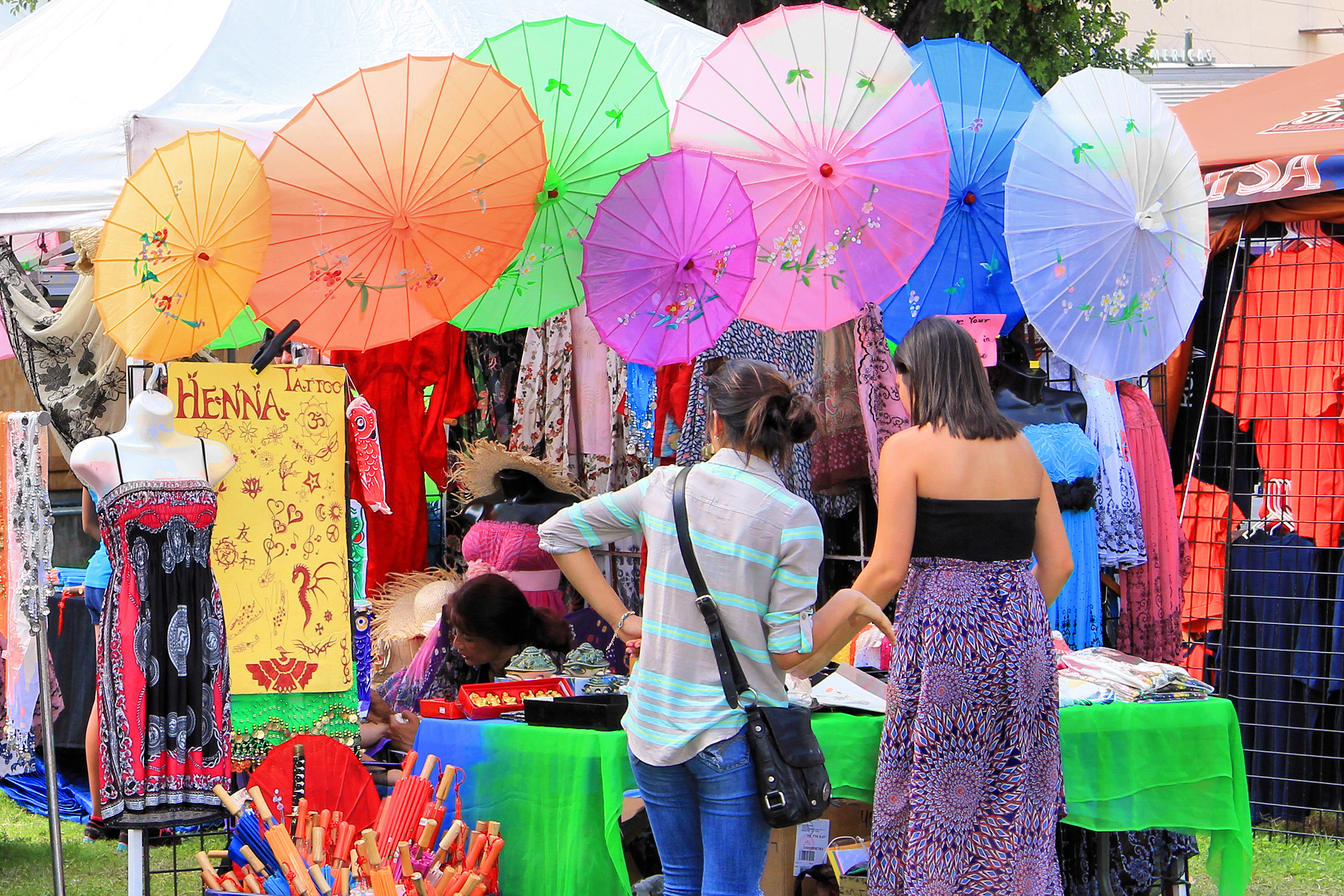
Vendor booths

== See also ==
- Institute of Texan Cultures
- University of Texas at San Antonio
