= Jerome K. Harris Sr. =

American businessman and civic leader

- Born: October 11, 1899; Minneapolis, Minnesota, United States
- Died: October 18, 1984 (aged 85); San Antonio, Texas
- Occupation(s): Businessman, civic leader
- Known for: Founding HemisFair '68
- Spouse: Gertrude Louise Harris
- Children: Marjory Jean Harris and Jerome K. Harris Jr.

Jerome K. Harris Sr. (October 11, 1899 – 1984) was an American businessman and civic leader, celebrated for his key role in the creation and development of HemisFair '68, the 1968 World's Fair held in San Antonio, Texas. Harris notably coined the name 'Hemisfair' and was the originator of the idea, formally given the honorary title 'Father of Hemisfair' in 1993 by the San Antonio City Council.

== Early life ==
Born in Minnesota, Harris graduated from the old Main High School and began his career at Frank Bros., a downtown San Antonio men's store, where he eventually rose from an entry-level position to vice president.

== Career ==
Harris' vision for San Antonio, Texas was to have its own World's Fair, celebrating the cultural diversity of the city by embracing education, technology, shared ties, and cultural advancement. He coined the name 'Hemisfair' and the event materialized in 1968, coinciding with the 250th anniversary of San Antonio. His idea, supported by local leaders, was officially sanctioned by the Bureau of International Expositions in 1965. Despite challenges, the fair drew over 6 million visitors and left a lasting legacy on the city. The Tower of the Americas, otherwise known as Hemisfair Tower, was one of the many lasting monuments and pieces of architecture that were erected for the fair and remain iconic to the city to this day.

In addition to his executive role at Frank Bros., Harris served in many civic leadership positions such as director of the San Antonio Chamber of Commerce and president of the Fiesta San Antonio Commission.

=== HemisFair '68 ===
HemisFair '68, themed "The Confluence of Civilizations in the Americas," was a transformative event for San Antonio, showcasing over thirty nations and fifteen corporations. Harris's concept celebrated the shared cultures of San Antonio and emphasized the city's commitment to cultural inclusion and advancement.

== Personal life ==
Harris was married to Gertrude Louise Harris, with whom he had two children, Marjory Jean Harris and Jerome Kling Harris Jr. Both children would follow in his legacy of civic duty and business leadership, building a retail business together in San Antonio and regularly participating in city engagements. Both Harris and his son would serve as president of the Fiesta Commission in San Antonio and as leading members of many other civic organizations.

=== Death and legacy ===
Harris died in 1984 in San Antonio, Texas. In 1993, the San Antonio City Council posthumously recognized his contributions to the city's development through HemisFair '68. A plate was erected in his honor.

== Sources ==
- "HemisFair '68 History". University of Texas at San Antonio Libraries.
- "Jerome K. Harris Sr. Oral History Interview". University of Texas at San Antonio Digital Collections.
