= Texans All =

Texans All is a series of books, organized by the Institute of Texan Cultures and published by the Texas A&M University Press, about the ethnic groups of Texas. They are titled: The African Texans by Alwyn Barr, The Asian Texans by Marilyn Dell Brady, The European Texans by Allan O. Kownslar, The Indian Texans by James M. Smallwood (about Native Americans), and The Mexican Texans by Phyllis McKenzie. All were published in 2004.

Middle school students are the intended clientele for the books, and therefore do not have jargon nor do they have complex argumentation. Michael E. Tate of the University of Nebraska–Lincoln stated that the books also were to get adult readers. Tate added that the books do cover "uglier sides of Texas history".

== Background ==
The institute first held an exhibition on the ethnography of Texas in 1968, and then published pamphlets in the 1970s that documented these ethnic groups. The institute sought to publish more up to date material, and worked with the university press to publish these books. Tate stated that the five books are "a more complete and polished version of those earlier publications".

Barr had done previous scholarly work and used it in his book.

== Reception ==
The Asian Texans was the winner of the Texas Reference Source Award in 2006.

Stephen K. Davis of Kingwood College praised the series, and praised Brady's work.

Bruce A. Glasrud, a scholar of Seguin, Texas, argued that the whole series is "striking". He felt that while all of the books were good, the books on African and indigenous Texans were among the best.

Tate praised the books' content of the ethnic groups in the 20th century.

== See also ==
- History of African Americans in Texas
- History of Chinese Americans in Texas
- Czech Texans
- German Texan
- Japanese in Texas
- History of Mexican Americans in Texas
- Native American tribes in Texas
- Wends of Texas
