= Institute of Texan Cultures =

Museum and library in Texas, United States

Coordinates: 29°25′00″N 98°28′56″W

UTSA Institute of Texan Cultures
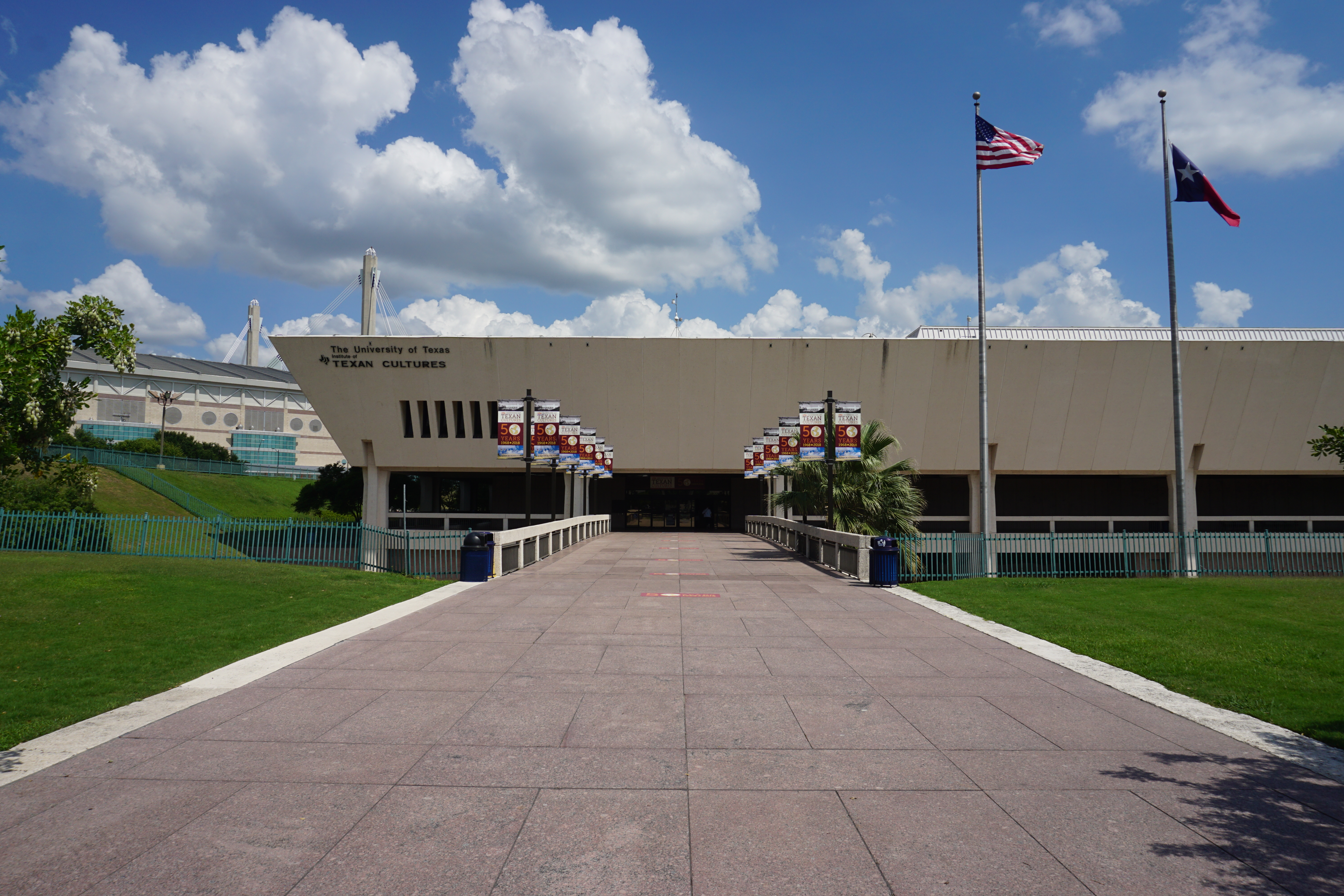
- Established: 1968
- Location: San Antonio, Texas; United States
- Website: texancultures.utsa.edu

The Institute of Texan Cultures (referred to as The ITC or The Institute) is a museum and library operating as a component of The University of Texas at San Antonio. The building which housed the institute is a striking example of Brutalist architecture, and was listed on the National Register of Historic Places in 2024.

It serves as the state's primary center for multicultural education, with exhibits, programs, and events like the Texas Folklife Festival, an annual celebration of the many ethnicities that make up the population of Texas. It has been held yearly since 1972.

The facility, established by the Texas Legislature on May 27, 1965, originally served as the Texas Pavilion at HemisFair '68 before being turned over to the University of Texas System in 1969. UTSA assumed administrative control of the museum in 1973. In 1986, the system designated the institute as a campus of the University of Texas at San Antonio.

The ITC, through its research, collections, exhibits and programs, serves as the forum for the understanding and appreciation of Texas and Texans. The 182,000-square-foot (16,900 m^{2}) complex had 65,000-square-foot (6,000 m^{2}) of interactive exhibits and displays. The library on the third floor contained manuscripts, rare books, personal papers, over 3 million historical photos and over 700 oral histories.

Funding for the museum comes primarily from three sources: biennial legislative appropriations; exhibit floor and special event admissions; grants, contributions, and other locally generated funds such as the rental of the museum's facilities, and the sale of its publications, audiovisuals, library services, and merchandise from The Museum Store. Major support is provided by the museum's Development Board. The Texas Legislature cut appropriations for the institute by 25% in 2011 causing the institute to rely more on private donations and corporate sponsorship.

The ITC fulfills its mandate as the state's center for multicultural education by investigating the ethnic and cultural history of the state and presenting the resulting information with a variety of offerings:

- Exhibits, programs, and special events designed to entertain, inspire, and educate
- A library focusing on ethnic and cultural history
- A historical photo collection of more than 3.5 million images
- An outreach program to schools and other groups
- Teacher-training workshops.

There are displays in the museum representing many cultures and their impact on the history and development of Texas.

In early 2010, the institute became an affiliate as part of the Smithsonian Affiliates program. Affiliate status grants the institute access to the Smithsonian's artifacts, education, and performing arts programs, expert speakers, teacher workshops, and resources to complement and broaden exhibitions. The affiliation agreement marks a new era for the institute. A series of upgrades were planned to revitalize main exhibit floor. As UTSA strives to achieve national research university status, the university's museum strives to become a cultural institution of equal caliber.

The university announced via a press release on April 3, 2024 that the museum would cease operations on May 31, 2024. Additionally it was announced the building housing the ITC has been tentatively scheduled for demolition and the museum would reopen in early 2025 at a temporary location within the Frost Bank Tower's first floor. At the time of the announcement there was no permanent museum location selected, and the temporary location is expected to operate through 2030 at which point a permanent location will have been selected, built, and be ready for opening to the public. Current contenders for a permanent museum are on the property of the UTSA Southwest Campus (Formerly The Southwest School of Art), and a parking lot adjacent to The Crockett Hotel near The Alamo. Demolition of the building began on April 8, 2025 despite lawsuits to stop it.

== See also ==
- List of museums in Central Texas
- Caudill Rowlett Scott (CRS)
- Texans All - A series of books organized by the institute
