= Puroslam =

Poetry slam operating in San Antonio, Texas

PuroSlam is a poetry slam operating in San Antonio, Texas. Started in 1999 by Benjamin Ortiz, PuroSlam has earned a national reputation as one of the "toughest, roughest, rowdiest" poetry slams in the United States, bringing performance poetry to South Texas on a weekly basis. Boston poet Dawn Gabriel described the San Antonio slam poetry scene in a 2006 article in the San Antonio Current: “I’m excited about San Antonio because they have a reputation for being the meanest Slam poets around.”

== History ==
=== The Re:Verb Months (May 1999-July 1999) ===
In 1999, Texas native Benjamin Ortiz, living in San Antonio after years spent in Chicago, organized and hosted the first weekly poetry slam in San Antonio, Texas. Held at the now defunct Re:Verb music lounge, the first PuroSlam- held on a Tuesday night, May 4, 1999, at 10:30 pm, as it has been every Tuesday since- attracted over 100 attendees. For the summer months that followed, a variety of poets from across South Texas visited the Re:verb every week in competition for vinyls and the weekly title of PuroSlam Champion. People attended to watch in an effort to absorb the wisdom of a dozen or more poets every week. Poet's ranged in skill, with the audience cheering the well written and heckling the poorly chosen. PuroSlam was not meant to be a poetry reading for the weak at heart, and by the end of its first month in existence, this fact was obvious to all who participated.

Unfortunately, PuroSlam's stint at its inaugural venue came to an end one July night when the owners of the Re:Verb decided to capitalise on the booming business brought in by the poetry slam and booked a Boston rock n roll band to share the stage with the poets. When the slam ran long and the band decided to soundcheck in the middle of the poetry, things turned ugly. Poets engaged the band members in heated battle, using words as weapons, and unable to respond eloquently, the drummer threw a drumstick in frustrated response, hitting the emcee in the forehead. Blood was spilled, punches were thrown, and by the time the melee died down, PuroSlam was without a home.

Benjamin Ortiz, in his article "Slamnation or Damnnation" for Britannica.com, writes about the early months of PuroSlam.

=== The Wild Club Months (August 1999-March 2000) ===
PuroSlam found a new stage and without missing a beat, it was up and running the following week at The Wild Club, a night club on the outskirts of downtown San Antonio. While the crowd at the Re:Verb was enthusiastic and at times rowdy, the mob at the new venue was nothing but rowdy. San Antonio earned its reputation as a tough slam city during the several months it was here as the heckling reached near violent proportions. Audience members routinely approached the stage as poets read, shouting obscenities in their face. While it never reached the boiling point where words turned to fists, the slam organizers had to shake their heads in awe (and fear) at the monster they had created.

Despite the antagonistic atmosphere, San Antonians still poured through the doors every Tuesday night. Up to 20 poets a week signed up to compete for the attention of a drunk, loud audience numbering near 100. The competition would last until the wee hours of the morning, sometimes closing down the bar before the last poet read and the final prizes were awarded.

Unfortunately, this venue was also not meant to be, as the ownership of the Wild Club found the weekly poetry crowd to be too rowdy for their taste. Once again, PuroSlam had to find a new home.

=== The El Toro Year (March 2000-March 2001) ===
Thanks to the hard work of The Wild Club soundman- San Antonio's infamous Hollis- PuroSlam landed on its feet once again and found a new home on the St. Mary Strip, the same strip where MTV filmed its Halloween Special in the early nineties. Their new home was El Toro, an all ages music venue that saw PuroSlam drawing its biggest crowds yet. The out-of-control berating of the Wild Club disappeared, replaced by a finely tuned heckling that raised the act of verbal dissent to an art form. For months straight, over 100 people came out weekly to watch as many as 22 poets a night compete until as late as 1:30 in the morning. The attendance peak was reached in March 2001 when DJ Jester, The Filipino Fist, held his first CD release party during the slam, cramming 167 people into the smoke filled venue. Again, the owner was not happy with this bristling business and weeks later, she threatened to kick PuroSlam out onto the streets, demanding that they give her a cut of the two dollar entrance fee. When PuroSlam's organizers refused, reminding her that she was doing better bar business on Tuesdays than she was on the weekend, she flexed her muscles and left PuroSlam homeless once again. When co-slammasters Shaggy and Phil West stayed outside to inform slam fans that PuroSlam was moving once again, the El Toro owner called the cops and threatened to have him arrested for loitering.

=== The Sam's Burger Joint years (since March 2001) ===
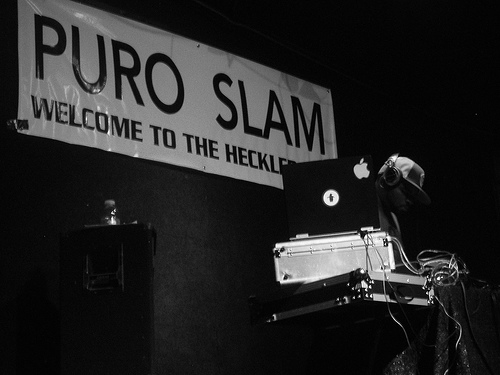

Finally, after bouncing around from venue to venue for almost two years, PuroSlam found a home at Sam's Burger Joint, a punk rock club in San Antonio. Through the efforts of Hollis, Sam's hosted PuroSlam, and since March 2001, the two entities have worked together to bring poetry to an average of 120 attendees a week. During a 128-week span starting in December 2002 and ending during a San Antonio Spurs NBA Finals game in 2005, PuroSlam attracted over 100 paid attendees each week, including a seven-week span in the summer of 2004 when over 200 people attended every Tuesday. This streak saw a high of 318 guests for Survivor Slam III in December '03, and a low of 47 on a June night in 2005 when the San Antonio Spurs played the Detroit Pistons during the NBA Finals. The three lowest nights in PuroSlam attendance history all occurred in June on nights when the Spurs were competing for NBA titles.

September 11, 2001 – The only Tuesday night - other than Christmas, Christmas Eve, or New Year's Eve - that PuroSlam was not up and running was Tuesday, September 11, 2001. Due to the tragic events of the day, co-Slammasters Phil West and Shaggy chose to cancel slam for that night, with Shaggy hanging out at Sam's Burger Joint for almost an hour informing people of his decision. Surprisingly, a large number of people showed up, expressing an interest in community and the cathartic aspects of poetry. Ultimately, the decision was made not to hold slam, but the following week, over 100 people came out and the healing process, at least as far as PuroSlam was concerned, began.

=== The 2000 San Antonio National Poetry Slam Team ===
In May 2000, San Antonio held its first ever National Poetry Slam Team tryouts. Over the course of 2 weeks, 12 poets read 8 poems trying to earn 4 spots on the team that would represent San Antonio and PuroSlam at its first ever National Poetry Slam competition. When all was said and done, Amalia Ortiz, Rich Perin, Jason "Shaggy" Gossard, and T-Bone earned spots on that team, traveling to Providence, RI in August to compete against 54 other teams from across the nation. Surprising themselves and the entire slam nation, the rookie team found themselves on the Finals Stage on Saturday night, competing against three teams from New York City. Holding their own against the veteran powerhouses, San Antonio took second place, losing to NYC-Urbana by a mere tenth of a point. Pictures of Finals can be seen here.

== Puroslam Contributions To The Slam World ==
Over the years, PuroSlam has constantly evolved in an effort to give San Antonio the best poetry slam possible. Below is a list of some of the wrinkles that have been introduced into the PuroSlam tapestry.

THE VISOR'- In February 2003, on a rare 32 degree Texas night, a poet whose name has been lost in the wind, showed up at PuroSlam wearing tennis shorts and a plastic visor. He read his poem and scored an abysmally low but well-deserved 7.3 (out of a possible 30). The audience hated his poem but loved his incompetence. After the scores were read, a voice from the back (see "Controversy over Visor" below) yelled, "Score the Visor!". Taking the audience's cue, the host urged the judges to put up their scores card once again, only this time in an effort to score the visor. The visor scored an 11.3, four points higher than the poem written by the visor's owner. From this point on, PuroSlam has awarded a Visor to any poet scoring below an 11.3. On the visor it reads, "I Scored Lower Than the Visor At Puroslam!"; and if the winner of said Visor shows up at the slam wearing the Visor, he gets in free.

PuroSlam Organizes approximately four specialty slams annually, featuring alternative formats and rules that differ from its regular poetry competitions. These events introduce additional challenges for participating poets and provide audiences with varied performances.

- SURVIVOR SLAM- The Survivor Slam series is based on the CBS television show Survivor. Picking teams elementary school kickball style (in an effort to up the humiliation factor), the poets divide into two teams and compete head-to-head in a variety of themed rounds. These rounds include original poetry, cover poems (in which poets read and perform the poetry of another poet), haiku, limericks, freestyle, anything goes poetry where poets can use props or costumes, and even karaoke. At the end of each round, one poet wins immunity, protecting them from elimination in the following round, while another poet is eliminated. The rounds proceed until only one poet remains and that poet is declared the Survivor Slam Champion. As of August 2007, PuroSlam has held eight Survivor Slams, with local poet Monique Martin winning four of those eight competitions.

=== The Price Is Right Slam ===
The Price Is Right Slam series is based on the CBS television show, The Price Is Right. To start the slam, four poets "Come on down!" to the stage where they guess the retail price of certain items. The poet who guesses the closest without going over wins the item and gets to choose which poet reads next. As with the Survivor Slam above, each round showcases a different style of poetry, including original poetry, cover poems, haiku, limericks, freestyle, anything goes poetry where poets can use props or costumes, and karaoke. The final round- the Showcase Showdown- consists of the final two poets competing head to head with an original poem. Before the round commences, the poets guess what the cumulative total of their respective scores will be. The difference between their guess and the actual cumulative is deducted from their respective score, and the highest scoring poet after this deduction is declared the winner.

== Heckling ==
Heckling is the shouting of an uninvited comment, usually disparaging, at a performance or event, that interrupts set pieces or performances. While slam poetry has, from its beginnings, been about audience participation, PuroSlam has taken that concept and pushed it to its limits. Unlike typical open mic poetry readings, where audience members are encouraged to sit quietly until the end of the poem, at which point they are encouraged to clap politely (see golf clap), PuroSlam implores its audience to respond immediately. If they like what they hear, the audience claps, cheers, hoots, and hollers in immediate appreciation of the performance on stage. similarly, if they do not like what they hear, the audience boos, hisses, makes noise, talks, heckles, or outright ignores the poet while they do other things. It is the policy of PuroSlam that if the poet cannot earn the audience's attention through her words and performance, then it is the audience's right to respond as they see fit.

THE CAR WASH CLAP- Possibly the sincerest form of heckling at PuroSlam, the Car Wash Clap appears only for those poets who a) don't seem affected by normal levels of heckling and b) perform long enough that something other than verbal taunts must be issued. Mimicking the opening rhythm of the Rose Royce song "Car Wash", the audience slowly starts to clap, in unison, gaining in volume until the funk rhythm overwhelms the funkless rhymes of the poet. Timid poets usually succumb to the disco groove and walk off stage with head held down, but there are a confident few who feel empowered by the audience's interaction and do not seem to get the message that getting Car Wash Clapped is not a positive thing.

THE COMEDY CONTROVERSY OF 2006- In the summer of 2006, PuroSlam teamed up with Comedia A Go-Go a San Antonio sketch comedy group known for its controversial and cutting edge humor. On a Saturday night in July, Sam's Burger Joint hosted the two organizations as they put on a $500 All Texas Invitational Slam coupled with a night of sketch comedy. Unknown to the poets, one of the Comedia A Go-Go members signed up as a poet and 'competed' for the $500 prize. During her poem, a well-written piece about her dying grandfather, two other Comedia A Go-Go members began heckling her, yelling from their seats that her poem sucked and that she should not exploit her grandfather's ailing health. At this point, not knowing that this was a pre-arranged bit, several poets from other Texas cities approached the hecklers and physically confronted them. The Sam's Burger Joint security staff was forced to get involved, there was much pushing and shoving, and several minutes later things returned to normal and the poet finished her poem. During the set break that shortly followed, arguments ensued outside about the inappropriateness of the bit, and PuroSlam took much criticism over their decision to allow such an event to transpire. After the break, the poet, who, along with PuroSlam, was in on the planned heckling, defended the art of comedy, and explained that what they were doing was just as legitimate an art form as what the poets were trying to achieve.

PuroSlam Nationals Teams
| 2000 | Grand Slam Champion: Amalia Ortiz , Rich Perin , Jason "shaggy" Gossard, T-Bone , Alternate: Jacquie Moody |
| 2001 | Grand Slam Champion: Amalia Ortiz, Rich Perin, Jason "Shaggy" Gossard, Monique Martin, Alternate: Shannon McGarvey |
| 2002 | Grand Slam Champion: Amalia Ortiz, Ife, Shannon McGarvey, Randy Barrios, Alternate: Monique Martin |
| 2003 | Grand Slam Champion: Juan Antonio Meza Campean, Monique Martin, Anthony Flores, Ife, Alternate: Randy Barrios |
| 2004 | Grand Slam Champion: Ife, Big Poppa E , Monique Martin, Knowledge, Alternate: RiaListic |
| 2005 | Grand Slam Champion: Justin Smith, RiaListic, Vocab, Anthony Flores |
| 2006 | Grand Slam Champion: Anthony Flores |
| 2007 | Grand Slam Champion: Diamond LaRae, Anthony Flores, Amanda Flores, Vocab |
| 2008 | Grand Slam Champion: David Hendler, Monique Martin, Andrea "Vocab" Sanderson, Amanda Flores |
