= Hafnarborg =

Hafnarborg, The Hafnarfjordur Centre of Culture and Fine Art.
- Hafnarborg, Menningar- og listamiðstöð Hafnarfjarðar.
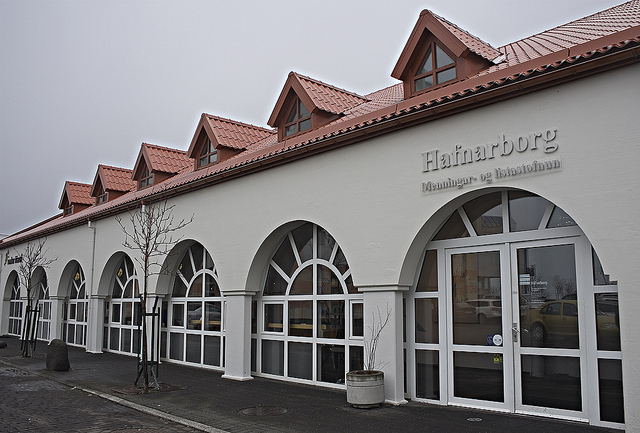
- The Hafnarfjörður Centre of Culture and Fine Art
- Location: Strandgata 34, 220 Hafnarfjörður, Iceland
- Coordinates: 64.0678°N 21.9554°W
- Type: Art Museum
- Collection size: 1400
- Visitors: 64,400 (2013)
- Director: Ágústa Kristófersdóttir
- Public transit access: Hafnarfjörður/Fjörður Shopping mall
- Website: hafnarborg.is
- Admission: Free

Hafnarborg, The Hafnarfjördur Centre of Culture and Fine Art, is a public art museum located in Hafnarfjörður, Iceland. It was opened in May 1988 but the foundation for the institution was laid in 1983 when Dr. Sverrir Magnússon and his wife, Ingibjörg Sigurjónsdóttir donated their house along with a substantial collection of art and books to Hafnarfjörður on the seventy-fifth anniversary of the incorporation of the town. Hafnarborg exhibits works by leading Icelandic and international artists and the exhibition program displays both contemporary and established artists from the 20th century. Hafnarborg is located at Strandgata 34 in the downtown of Hafnarfjörður, Iceland and it is easily accessible by bus number 1 from Iceland's capital city Reykjavik.

== Audiences ==
In May 1988 when Hafnarborg was opened, the founder of the museum, Dr. Sverrir Magnússon, was asked for whom the museum should be and his answer was that it should be for the inhabitants of the town, the generation that helped create these valuables and for their children and grandchildren. The museum seeks to attract a variety of visitors, both Icelanders and tourists. Access to Hafnarborg is not limited by age and the museum seeks to reach out to wider audiences with various backgrounds.

== The Museum's policy ==
Purpose and role The purpose of Hafnarborg, the Hafnarfjordur Centre of Culture and Fine Art is to promote cultural and diverse life in Hafnarfjörður, the town it is located in. The role of the museum is to collect and preserve the town's art collection and also to research and exhibit pieces in the collection regularly. The museum should strive to make the collection visible to the public so that the cultural heritage of the town can be enjoyed and become a part of the Icelandic history of culture and art. The museum operates according to its constitution and in accordance with the town's cultural policy, museum law and protocol of the International Council of Museums.

Main objective / goals The museum's goals include the following:

- That quality and boldness characterize the program of the museum, which will contribute to a positive image of the town and its resident's self-identity.
- That exhibitions and events in the museum reflect diversity and change in contemporary art.
- Art events should be well presented and a visit to the museum should be a part of the daily lives of the local residents where they can be educated, entertained and have an interesting experience of the arts.
- Art education should be focused to reach students at all levels and a visit to Hafnarborg should be a desirable option that strengthens progress in education.
- The museum should be in collaboration with artists, museums and other cultural institutions domestically and internationally.

The museum is run as one of the town's institutions but has independent financing and its own board and art council.

The director of Hafnarborg is Ágústa Kristófersdóttir

Hafnarborg's board of directors are Almar Grímsson, Guðrún Ágústa Guðmundsdóttir and Lúðvík Geirsson.

Hafnarborg's art council are Jónína Guðnadóttir, Þorbjörg Br. Gunnarsdóttir and Brynhildur Pálsdóttir.

== The collection ==
Dr. Sverrir Magnússon and his wife Ingibjörg Sigurjónsdóttir laid the foundation of Hafnarborg when they donated their house and a considerable collection of 160 paintings. The museum was formally opened in May 1988 and the collection has grown considerably since then, both through purchases and through gifts from artists and collectors. One of Iceland's most respected painter, Eiríkur Smith donated over four hundred paintings by himself to the museum in 1990. The museum strives to strengthen and augment the collection with purchases so that it reflects important changes in history of art. The collection now consists of 1400 art works by various artists both Icelandic and foreign. Hafnarborg has the duty to catalogue its collection, foster research and the publication of books and catalogues based on such research of the art collection. Hafnarborg was the first museum in Iceland to complete a fully computerized catalogue of its collection. The collection is presently being listed online in the electronic museum collections database, www.sarpur.is, which was opened to the public in May 2013.

Since the beginning in 1988, paintings from the collection have been placed in the public institutions of the town so that art is brought out to the people Selections from the art collection have been exhibited regularly. The latest exhibition displaying artwork from the collection opened on February 1, 2014 called “Your choice” where the public chooses objects from the museum's collection to be exhibited via the website www.sarpur.is where information on a large part of the museum's collection can be found visually online.

== Education ==
Two museum educators work in Hafnarborg and guided tours are available upon request. In the museum's policy a great emphasis is placed on education and that it should host a dynamic educational program in connection with its exhibitions. The education in the museum involves developing critical, conceptual and analytical skills while engaging with art in the museum. The aim is to support education in schools by keeping the national curriculum in mind. Furthermore, the museum seeks to develop a base for discussion and debates where personal experience can be used as a starting point to interpret and analyze.

== Community outreach and engagement activities ==
Hafnarborg has been an active center for art and cultural events and the museum is a popular venue for musicians and singers and the total number of concerts runs to many hundreds. Concerts have formed an important part of Hafnarborg's programme. The Museum cooperated in the years 1990 – 2012 with Tríó Reykjavíkur, one of Iceland's most respected chamber groups which played in concerts in Hafnarborg multiple times every year during that period. Another important concert series is the Noon Concerts, which is a half an hour concert held once a month on a Tuesday at noon. The artistic director of the Noon Concerts is Antonia Hevesi. The museum holds frequent art workshops and courses for children, guided tours, lectures, openings and a competition to become a curator for the autumn exhibition.
