= St. Mary's Strip =

Entertainment district in San Antonio, Texas

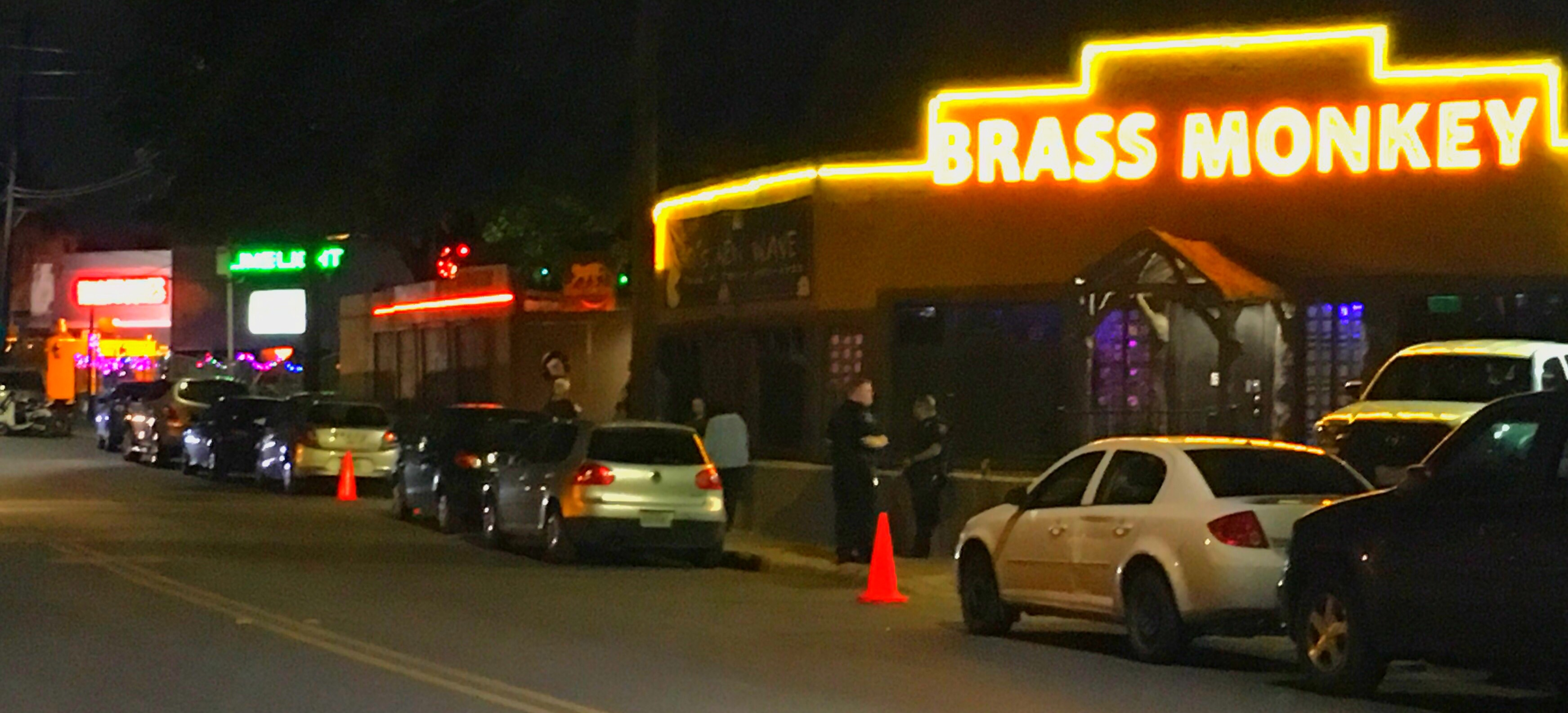
- Bars, clubs, and venues line a section of N. St. Mary's Street near E. French Place
- Length: 0.6 mi (0.97 km)
- Location: San Antonio, Texas
- Postal code: 78212
- North end: Mistletoe Avenue
- South end: Grayson Street

The St. Mary's Strip is an entertainment district in Midtown San Antonio. Located just north of downtown, "the St. Mary’s Strip" encompasses a section of North St. Mary's that is roughly bounded by Mistletoe Avenue and Grayson Street. It is situated adjacent to the Pearl Brewery and is part of a rapidly redeveloping corridor of central San Antonio.

In contrast to the tourist-oriented River Walk, the St. Mary’s Strip is geared more towards locals. Every weekend, thousands of people visit the bars, clubs, coffee shops, food trucks, restaurants, and entertainment venues that line St. Mary's Street west of U.S. Highway 281 and north of Interstate 35.

== History ==
The St. Mary’s Strip has been called "San Antonio's first entertainment corridor", with some drawing comparisons between it and Austin's Sixth Street during its heyday. The area around Tobin Hill, the neighborhood in which it resides, was first developed in 1731 as agricultural land. In 1777, the "Upper Labor" acequia was constructed on the southern fringe of Tobin Hill, following the Rock Quarry Road -- the predecessor to the modern St. Mary's Street.

A century passed before any significant, non-agricultural development took place. By the late 19th century, the area was known as the "Old Main Association", a reference to the section of Main Avenue that ran through its boundaries. A series of court cases inadvertently paved the way for residential suburbs, and members of the Tobin family erected seven houses in the 1880s and 1890s, lending their name to that of the current neighborhood. By 1919, the streetcar reached the eastern edge of Tobin Hill, opening the doors to commercial development along St. Mary's Street and other north-south corridors touched by the city's public transportation system, such as San Pedro and McCullough.

In spite of the decline of streetcar and its eventual disbandment in San Antonio in the 1930s, North St. Mary's continued to thrive as a major northbound commercial corridor extending from the city's central business district, aided by the construction of I-35 between it and downtown in the 1950s. The St. Mary’s Strip was adversely affected by the controversial construction of U.S. Highway 281 to its immediate east in the 1970s, losing much of its traffic to the city's newly constructed major north-south expressway.

The St. Mary’s Strip experienced its famous first golden age during the 1980s and early 1990s, with an estimated 15,000 people attending an MTV block party hosted by Daisy Fuentes and another 12,000 coming out for a Halloween bash in late 1990. Musician Art Sandoli's "The St. Mary's Strip", released in the fall of 1985, celebrated the burgeoning entertainment corridor's newly formed identity. This golden age came to a close with the subsequent rise in crime in the area. Violence discouraged patrons from visiting, and nightlife began to taper off into its nadir in the late 1990s and early 2000s. The murder of Alamo Heights resident George “Tres” Waters III on July 8, 1990 shocked the community, tarnishing St. Mary's reputation for a generation. According to Texas Public Radio's David Martin Davies, who used to be a bartender for several establishments along the St. Mary’s Strip during that time, crime in the area was "sensationalized and blown out of proportion by the local media". A former San Antonio police officer described the character of most crime in the area as "quality of life" issues, such as those of parking and loud music.

The street has recently been revitalized with an influx of millennial activity. New bars have sprung up to complement the character of some of the older establishments. The Phantom Room, the St. Mary’s Strip's southern anchor, burned to the ground in late 2016.
