= Bill FitzGibbons =

American artist based in San Antonio, Texas

- Born: 1950, Memphis, Tennessee, United States
- Education: University of Tennessee (BFA); Washington University in St. Louis (MFA)
- Awards: Fulbright Scholar – Hungarian Academy of Art, 2012 3D State Artist of Texas, Arts and Letter Award Friends of the San Antonio Public Library
- Known for: Public art light sculptures, environmental art

Bill FitzGibbons (born 1950) is an American artist born in Memphis, Tennessee, known for public light sculptures and environmental art. FitzGibbons has worked with sculpture for over thirty years, and has done projects in numerous countries, including Finland, Iceland, Germany, and the UK. For 2012, the state of Texas announced FitzGibbons as a State Artist.

== Biography ==
Towards the end of the 1960s, FitzGibbons graduated from high school and left his Memphis home to move east and attend college. He attended the University of Tennessee and then Washington University in St. Louis. FitzGibbons credits the Russian Constructivists, particularly their sculpture and philosophy, with exerting impact on his early work. FitzGibbons' first creations were neon paintings, they were followed by scrap material media projects, and subsequently by polyester resin sculptures.

Fitzgibbons arrived in San Antonio in 1988 and he worked at the San Antonio Art Institute.

When Linda Pace created her foundation called Artpace, it was Fitzgibbons who suggested to her that she include an artists' residency program that would include local, national, and international artists.

He completed 30 public art projects, many while working full-time as executive director of Blue Star Contemporary Art Museum, which he directed for 11 years, he retired to pursue his art, and for a time directed special projects on a part-time basis.

For 2012 FitzGibbons was announced as the 3D state artist of Texas. When he received the award, FitzGibbons expressed the hope that "more attention on the state level can be brought to the arts, so the government can understand that the support of the visual and performing arts in the state actually is an investment in our future and it should be one of the fundamentals of education."

== Artistic style ==
Public Art Light Sculpture

An example of a FitzGibbons public art light sculpture would be his LightRails. It lights a tunnel in Birmingham, Alabama. The installation is composed of a network of computerized LEDs that have lighting patterns.

In 2008, he created Alamo Lights for San Antonio's first Luminaria: Arts Night in SA.

Environmental Art

An example of a FitzGibbons environmental art work rendering would be his Duck Pond, at the plaza of the Heritage Park Duck Pond. The work has eight steel columns holding ducks.

== Artworks ==
- 1990 Lemon Creek Plaza, Lemon Creek Correctional Facility. (Juneau, AK)
- 1996 Rhode Island Lights, exterior, neon sculpture at the Rhode Island Convention Center. (Providence, RI)
- 2001 Duck Pond Plaza, design Team with Groves and Associates, redesign of a neighborhood park with public art. (San Antonio, TX)
- 2003–2005 Skywall, 60’ long sculpture with LED lights at the Bush Intercontinental Airport. (Houston, TX)
- 2006 Light Channels, site-specific, public art project consisting of aluminum sculptures and hundreds of LED lights. Installed at the I-37 underpasses at Houston and Commerce Streets. (San Antonio, TX)
- 2006 Day Star Archway, 40' tall archway and walkway at the San Antonio International Airport. (San Antonio, TX)
- 2008 Alamo Lights, site-specific, ephemeral light installation on the Alamo; Luminaria festival. (San Antonio, TX)
- 2010 Knoxville ColorLine, Site-specific ephemeral light installation at the Knoxville Museum of Art. (Knoxville, TN)
- 2013 San Antonio Colorline, a permanent, site-specific LED light sculpture for the downtown Robert B. Green University Health System Clinic. (San Antonio, TX)
- 2013 LightRails, downtown. (Birmingham, AL)
- 2014 Culebra Plaza, environmental plaza with LED light sculpture. This artwork was in collaboration with the local neighborhood association and school. (San Antonio, TX)
- 2016 Centro Chrome Tower, an 85-foot interactive light sculpture tower that is part of the new downtown Westside Transit Center. (San Antonio, TX)
- 2016 Kinetic Skyline, a permanent, site-specific LED light sculpture for the Bank of America plaza building.
- 2018 El Paso Passage, site-specific computerized LED light sculpture under Airways Blvd. at the entrance to the El Paso International Airport.

== Exhibitions ==
- 2007 Shattering Glass, Katonah Museum of Art, Katonah, New York
- 2008 Alamo Lights, Luminaria: Arts Night in SA San Antonio, Texas
- 2014 Right Side/Wrong Side, Performance, Lawndale Art Center, Houston, Texas
- 2015 Lalit Kala Akademi (National Academy of Art), New Delhi India
- 2021 The State of Sculpture, San Angelo Museum of Fine Art, San Angelo, Texas

== Awards ==
- 1993 Fulbright Scholar, Hungarian Academy of Art and Design
- 2010 Outstanding Alumni Award, University of Tennessee
- 2012 Texas State 3D Artist, Texas Commission on the Arts
- 2014 CODAaward for LightRails, juried for the best design project in the transportation category
- 2017 Arts & Letters Award, Friends of the San Antonio Public Library
- 2022 CODAworx, Stockyard Spectrum selected as one of the Top 100 International Public Art Projects
