= HemisFair '68 =

World's Fair held in San Antonio, Texas

1968 San Antonio
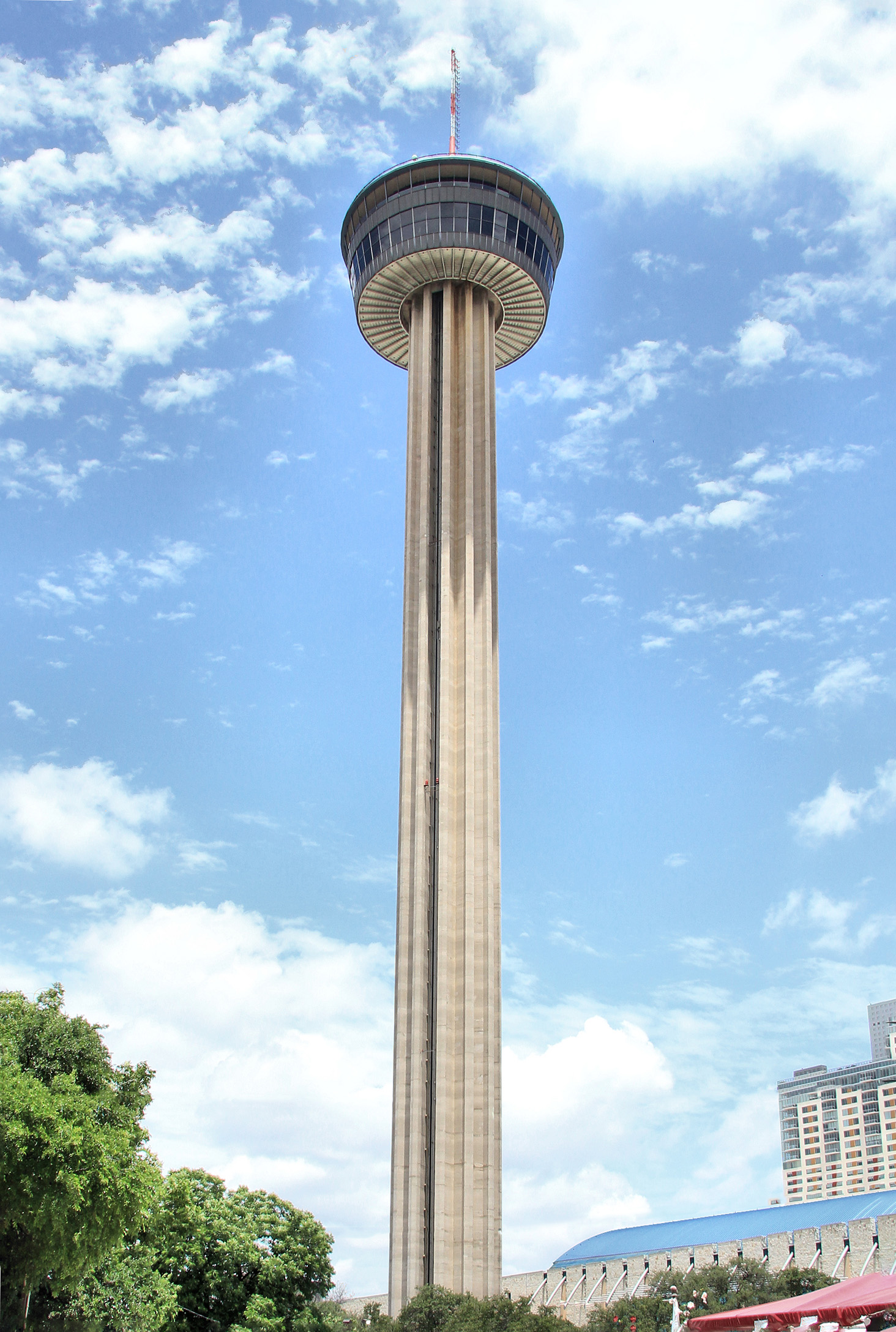
- The Tower of the Americas, the theme structure for HemisFair '68

Overview
- BIE-class: Specialized exposition
- Name: HemisFair '68
- Motto: The Confluence of Civilizations in the Americas
- Building(s): Tower of the Americas
- Area: 96 acres (39 hectares)

Participant(s)
- Countries: 30
- Organizations: 15

Location
- Country: United States
- City: San Antonio
- Coordinates: 29°25′8.4″N 98°28′58.8″W

Timeline
- Awarded: November 17, 1965
- Opening: April 6, 1968
- Closure: October 6, 1968

Specialized expositions
- Previous: IVA 65 in Munich
- Next: Expo 71 in Budapest

Universal Expositions
- Previous: Expo 67 in Montreal
- Next: Expo '70 in Osaka

HemisFair '68 was the official 1968 World's Fair (or International Exposition) held in San Antonio, Texas, from April 6 through October 6, 1968. Local businessman and civic leader Jerome K. Harris Sr. coined the name HemisFair and conceived the idea for the fair, hoping it would unite all the cultures that comprise San Antonio and solidify the city's reputation as a cultural and historic destination. With help from commissioner Henry B. Gonzales and other San Antonio leaders, the fair materialized and helped transform the city from a cowtown to one of the largest cities in the country. The theme of the fair was "The Confluence of Civilizations in the Americas", celebrating the many nations which settled the region. The fair was held in 1968 to coincide with the 250th anniversary of the founding of San Antonio in 1718. More than thirty nations and fifteen corporations hosted pavilions at the fair.

The Bureau International des Expositions (BIE) which oversees World's Fairs and Expositions, awarded HemisFair '68 with official Fair status on November 17, 1965.

The theme character of the fair was a dragon named Luther created by Sid and Marty Krofft, who was later renamed and starred in the Kroffts' Saturday morning television show H.R. Pufnstuf. The main premise of the show was taken from their production for the Coca-Cola pavilion at the fair.

== Funding ==
The venture, which had an announced cost of $156 million, was financed by a combination of public and private funds. Public funding included $12.2 million from the U.S. Housing and Home Finance Agency for acquiring and clearing the site, $11 million in publicly approved city bonds for construction of the convention center and arena, $5.5 million in general revenues from the City of San Antonio for construction of the Tower of the Americas, $10 million from the State of Texas primarily for the construction of the Texas State Pavilion, and $7.5 million from the United States Congress for the construction of the United States pavilion.

Although HemisFair '68 attracted 6.3 million visitors and brought international attention to San Antonio and Texas, attendance never matched predictions, and the fair lost $7.5 million.

== Site ==
The fair was built on a 96.2-acre (389,000 m^{2}) site on the southeastern edge of Downtown San Antonio. The site was acquired mainly through eminent domain. Many structures in what was considered a blighted area were demolished and moved to make room for the fair. The project was partially developed with federal urban renewal funds. The San Antonio Conservation Society recommended that 129 structures on the site be preserved; however, on August 9, 1966, an agreement was made to save only 20 existing structures that would be incorporated into the fair site. Overall, only 24 structures were saved.

In addition, as a part of the overall HemisFair project, the city extended its River Walk (Paseo del Rio) one-quarter of a mile into the site in order to link the River Walk and the HemisFair grounds in 1968. In 2001, the River Walk was extended again under the new Convention Center Expansion and is now connected to a small lagoon inside HemisFair Park.

== Opening ceremonies ==
HemisFair began on April 6, 1968, with the gates opening at 9:00 am and official ceremonies beginning at 10:00 am in the new Convention Center Arena. However, with the opening just two days after the assassination of Martin Luther King Jr., VIPs in attendance – including U.S. First Lady Lady Bird Johnson and Texas Governor John Connally, both of whom received death threats – were escorted around the site under heavy security.

== Pavilions at HemisFair ==
National pavilions at the fair included: Canada, Mexico, Italy, Spain, France, Japan, Belgium, Bolivia, Republic of China, Colombia, West Germany, South Korea, Panama, Portugal, Switzerland, Thailand and Venezuela. There were also shared pavilions such as a five-nation Central American pavilion, representing Nicaragua, Honduras, Guatemala, El Salvador, and Costa Rica and the special pavilions of the Organization of American States, which represented eleven more Latin American countries, including Brazil, Argentina, and Peru.

Corporate pavilions at the fair included: Eastman Kodak, Ford, General Electric, General Motors, Humble Oil (now ExxonMobil), IBM, RCA, Southwestern Bell (now AT&T), Frito Lay, Pepsi-Cola, Coca-Cola, American Express, Chrysler, and 3M.

Other pavilions at the fair included: the LDS Church, the Southern Baptist pavilion, the Women's Pavilion and Project Y (Youth Pavilion).

== Monorail ==
A 7,600-foot-long (2,300 m) monorail, named Mini-Monorail, connected pavilions together. The monorail was manufactured by Universal Design Limited and constructed by H.C.P. Enterprises. Ten days prior to the opening of the fair, on April 27, 1968, an electrical incident caused a fire. Later, an accident occurred on September 15, 1968 in which two trains collided and derailed. A 63-year-old woman died and 48 others were injured.

== Legacy ==
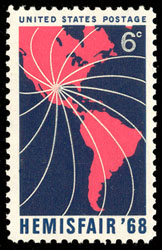
U.S. postage stamp commemorating HemisFair '68

After HemisFair, much of the land ownership was transferred to the State of Texas and the U.S. federal government. Today, the City of San Antonio owns approximately 50 acres (200,000 m^{2}) of the site, 30 of which the Henry B. González Convention Center occupies.

In 1986, many unused remaining structures built for the fair were removed and in celebration of the 20th Anniversary of HemisFair '68, approximately 15 acres (61,000 m^{2}) of the site were redeveloped with cascading waterfalls, fountains, playgrounds and lush landscaping. Many of the improvements were concentrated near the base of the Tower of the Americas. At the site's re-dedication in April 1988, the site was re-christened "HemisFair Park".

In 2008 Hyatt Hotels completed construction of the Grand Hyatt San Antonio on the north and eastern sides of the convention center theater originally built for HemisFair '68. It features guest rooms on the first 24 floors and condos on the last 10, all rooms on the south side have an unobstructed view of HemisFair Park and the Tower of the Americas.

=== Venues still on the site today ===
As of spring 2013, only a handful of structures built/renovated for the HemisFair remain on the former fairgrounds and are still open to the public.

Convention Center Theater – The theater (now Lila Cockrell Theater) was built as one of a three-building complex (along with the Convention Center and Arena) during the buildup for HemisFair '68 and leased to San Antonio Fair, Inc. for use during the fair. Sometime after the fair it was renamed in honor of the city's former three-term mayor Lila Cockrell. After decades of limited upgrades, the building received a 26 million dollar renovation in 2010.

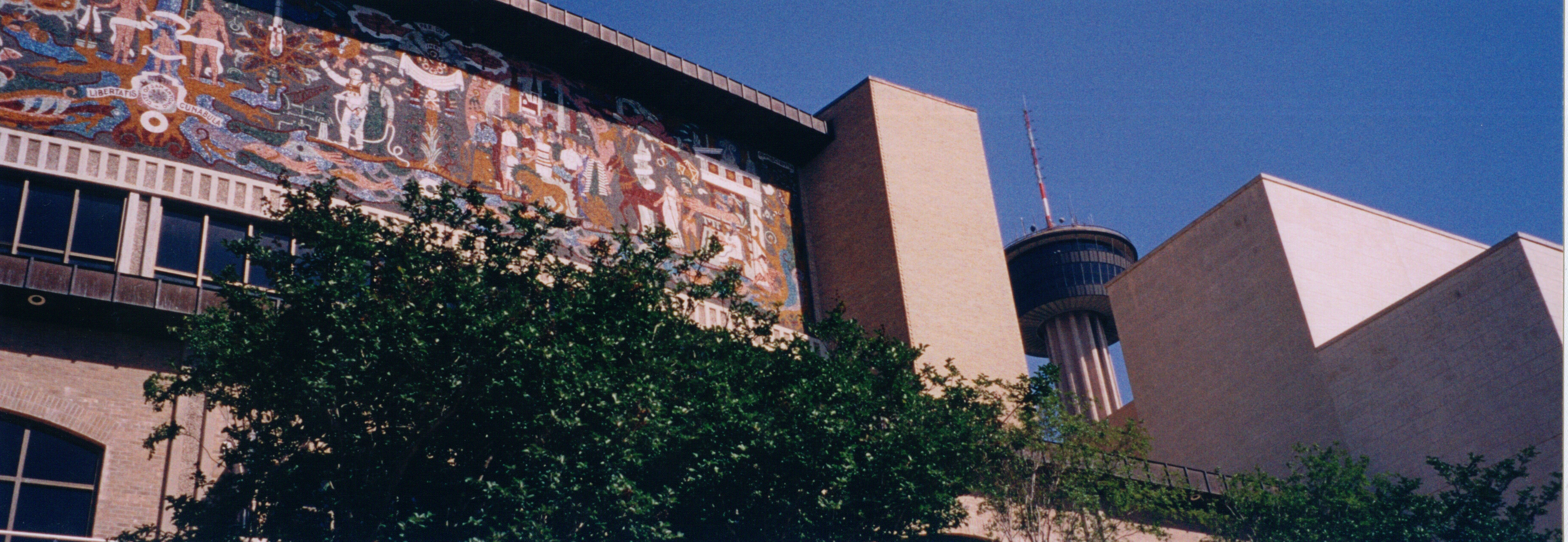
In the foreground the Lila Cockrell Theater and its Juan O'Gorman mosaic Confluence of Civilizations in the Americas, and in the background the Tower of the Americas. This building and mural were originally created for the 1968 HemisFair.

Above the windows on the exterior is a mural titled Confluence of Civilizations in the Americas, created by Mexican artist Juan O'Gorman for HemisFair '68.

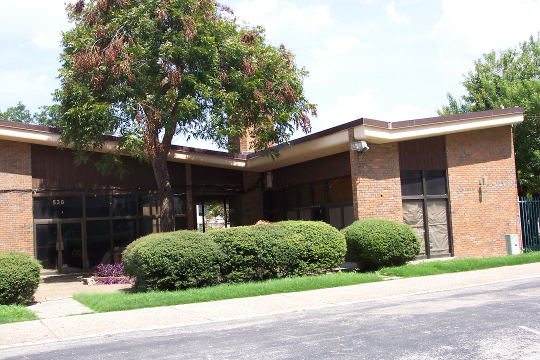
View of the Eastman Kodak Pavilion today

Eastman Kodak Pavilion – Built next to the Women's Pavilion, this venue has seen little to no use since the fair. It is projected that this building will be demolished to provide room for the eventual expansion of the Women's Pavilion.

Gulf Insurance Pavilion – Built near the Tower of the Americas as a rest area, today it is closed to the public and serves as storage and support for the tower.

Humble Oil Pavilion – Originally built in the 19th century, this building was renovated for HemisFair '68, and housed the exhibit and theater for Humble Oil (now ExxonMobil). In recent years the building was renovated again and now serves as additional banquet and ballroom facilities for the Hilton Palacio del Rio Hotel (also built for HemisFair) across the street.

Mexico Pavilion – This, now the Mexican Cultural Institute, is the only national pavilion still in its original location, although the original structure was modified and expanded during the expansion of the adjacent convention center and was re-opened in 2002.

Southern Baptist Pavilion – This building was originally a house, built in the late 19th century, as a wedding gift from Sam Edgar to his daughter. It was renovated for HemisFair '68 to house the exhibits for the Southern Baptist Convention. In 2012 the house was renovated again and now serves as offices for the Hemisfair Park Area Redevelopment Corporation.

State of Texas Pavilion – The fair's largest pavilion belonged to the state of Texas. This pavilion also remained after the fair closed and became the Institute of Texan Cultures, which was a museum and the third campus of the University of Texas at San Antonio. It was demolished in 2025, despite protests, to make way for a sports and entertainment complex known as Project Marvel.

Tower of the Americas – The fair's theme structure is this 750-foot-tall (228 m) tower, which remains today as San Antonio's tallest structure. The top of the tower houses a revolving restaurant, lounge, and outdoor observation deck. It was designed by architect O'Neil Ford.

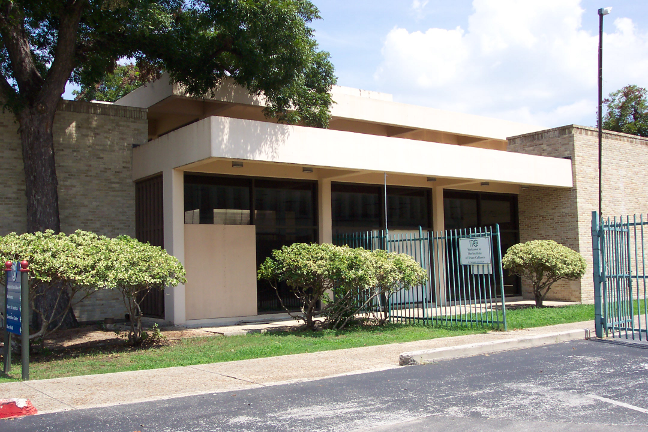
View of the Women's Pavilion today

United States of America Pavilion – The United States Confluence Theater (now the John H. Wood, Jr. United States District Court for the Western District of Texas) remains today as well as the Confluence Exhibit Hall (now the Adrian Spears Judicial Training Center). Part of the pavilion was a fountain called Migration. Although the bird sculptures have been replaced with bushes, the outline of the fountain is still in place.

Women's Pavilion – The theme of this venue was to showcase the contributions that women have made to society, past, present and future. It was built as a permanent structure to help meet the requirements of urban renewal, as well as to be part of the re-use plan after the fair. One idea was for it to be re-used as a student union building, as one proposal was to locate the new University of Texas at San Antonio campus on the site. After decades of use as a storage facility by the Institute of Texan Cultures, several women who were originally involved with the pavilion are working to restore and reopen it.

== HemisFair Park Area Redevelopment Corporation ==
In 2009, the San Antonio City Council under the leadership of Mayor Julián Castro created a non-profit organization, the HemisFair Park Area Redevelopment Corporation (HPARC), to generate ideas and oversee the redevelopment of the former fairgrounds, which had seen little development since 1988.

In 2012, HPARC completed the renovation of three indigenous structures on the site which now serve as offices (Eagar House), conference center (Carriage House), and support services (Eagar Dependency) for HPARC. Along with the renovations, the San Antonio City Council voted on and approved HPARC's master plan for the redevelopment of the former site. The plan includes the development of three public parks: Yanaguana Garden, Civic Park and Tower Park.

In 2015, the San Antonio City Council unanimously approved renaming the area from "HemisFair Park" to "Hemisfair", recognizing it as an urban parks district.

On October 2, 2015, Yanaguana Garden opened to the public.

== See also ==
- HemisFair Arena
- List of world expositions
- List of world's fairs
