= Menger Hotel =

- U.S. Historic district – Contributing property
- Recorded Texas Historic Landmark
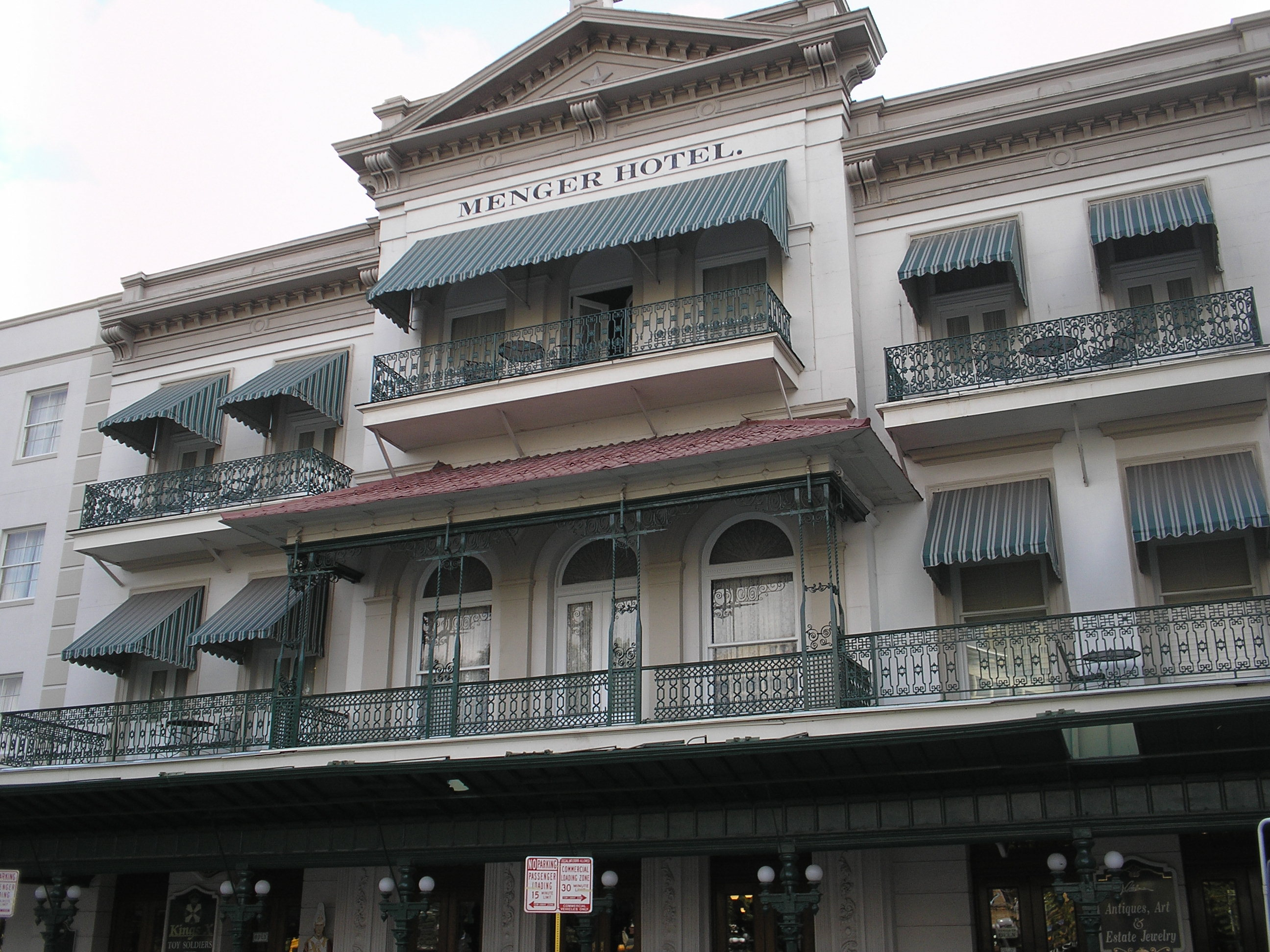
- Menger Hotel in 2005

- Location within Texas Location within the United States
- Location: 204 Alamo Plaza, San Antonio, Texas
- Coordinates: 29°25′29″N 98°29′11″W
- Built: 1859
- Architect: John Fries, Alfred Giles
- Part of: Alamo Plaza Historic District (ID77001425)
- RTHL No.: 3334

Significant dates
- Designated CP: July 13, 1977
- Designated RTHL: 1965

The Menger Hotel is a historic hotel located in downtown San Antonio, Texas, US, on the site of the Battle of the Alamo.

It was listed on the National Register of Historic Places in 1977 as a contributing building in the Alamo Plaza Historic District.

== The Menger family ==
William and Mary Menger opened the Menger hotel in 1859 in what is now San Antonio's Alamo Plaza Historic District, which includes the Alamo Mission. The plans for the hotel arose through the popularity of William Menger's brewery. The Mengers sold the property in 1881 to the Kampmann family. William Menger had emigrated from Germany to America in 1847. Menger settled in San Antonio and resumed his previous trade as a cooper and brewer. With his German roots Menger brought beer to San Antonio. He opened the Menger Brewery in 1855 on the battle-grounds of the Alamo (now known as the Alamo Plaza).

== Construction ==
In 1858 the Mengers hired an architect, John M. Fries, along with a contractor, J. H. Kampmann, to complete the two-story, 50-room hotel in San Antonio, Texas, which became a stopping point on the Chisholm Trail where cattle drovers could replenish their supplies while cattlemen sold and bought their livestock. Up until this time most accommodations in San Antonio were boarding houses, and there were few breweries. The Menger Hotel, opened in February 1859, served as a meeting place for cattle barons and was an immediate success; many cattle business transactions were made over the years in the hotel lobby. A marker in the present-day hotel courtyard commemorates the Chisholm Trail.

== Civil War period ==
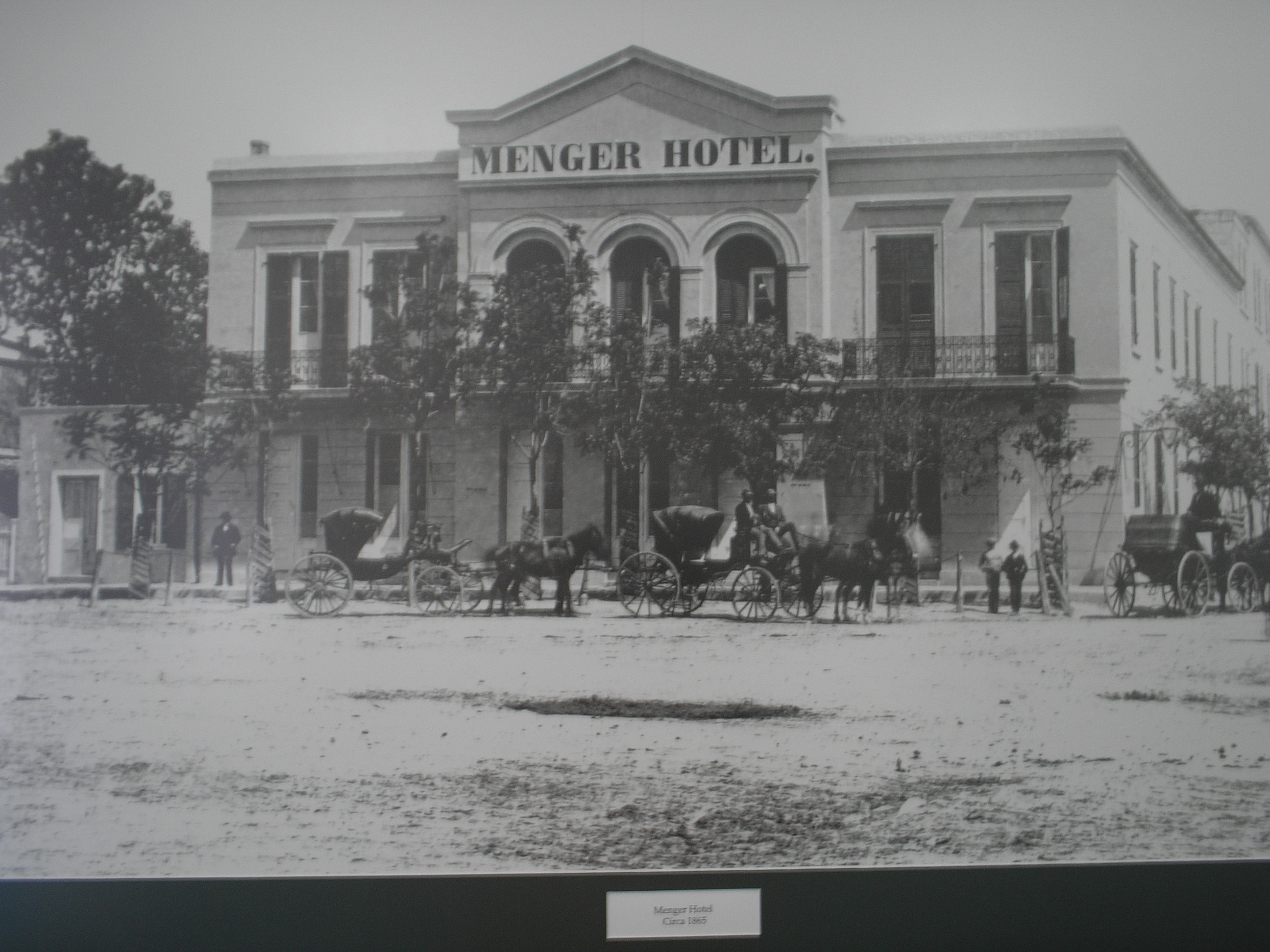
Menger Hotel (1865)

With the beginning of the American Civil War, a large number of Confederate soldiers were stationed at San Antonio, creating a need for more boarding houses to house them. The Menger family put the building in use to aid the Confederate war effort, and shut down the hotel's guestrooms. They kept the dining room open to feed military personnel, and offered space for the care of wounded soldiers. Once the war ended the hotel resumed full operations.

== Death of William Menger ==
After a little over a decade of running the Menger Hotel, William Menger died in 1871. However, Mary Menger and her son Louis William continued to run the hotel and brewery. She quickly ran an announcement in the local newspaper that she would carry on the business and her husband's death "would cause no change in affairs" within the hotel or brewery. She carried on business as usual and bought neighboring land on which to build new rooms to serve the influx of guests. In a one-year period she hosted more than 2,000 guests.

On February 19, 1877, the first passenger train steamed into San Antonio, which further contributed to the growing success of the hotel. This allowed for a higher volume of travelers through the city and promoted the growth of the Alamo Plaza, which became the location of San Antonio's first federal post office, opened in 1877. The hotel offered a mail chute on each floor for guests to use—outgoing mail was collected and taken to the post office. Mary Menger was aware that the building was lacking in modern bathrooms, proper water closets, or room service bells, and made these improvements.

By 1879, Menger had gas lighting installed. Although she and her son Louis maintained the hotel as well as they could, she was getting too old to manage the business and her son was not interested in taking over. Thus the decision was made to sell the hotel to its original contractor, Major J. H. Kampmann. It was sold on November 7, 1881, for $118,500.

== Kampmann ownership ==
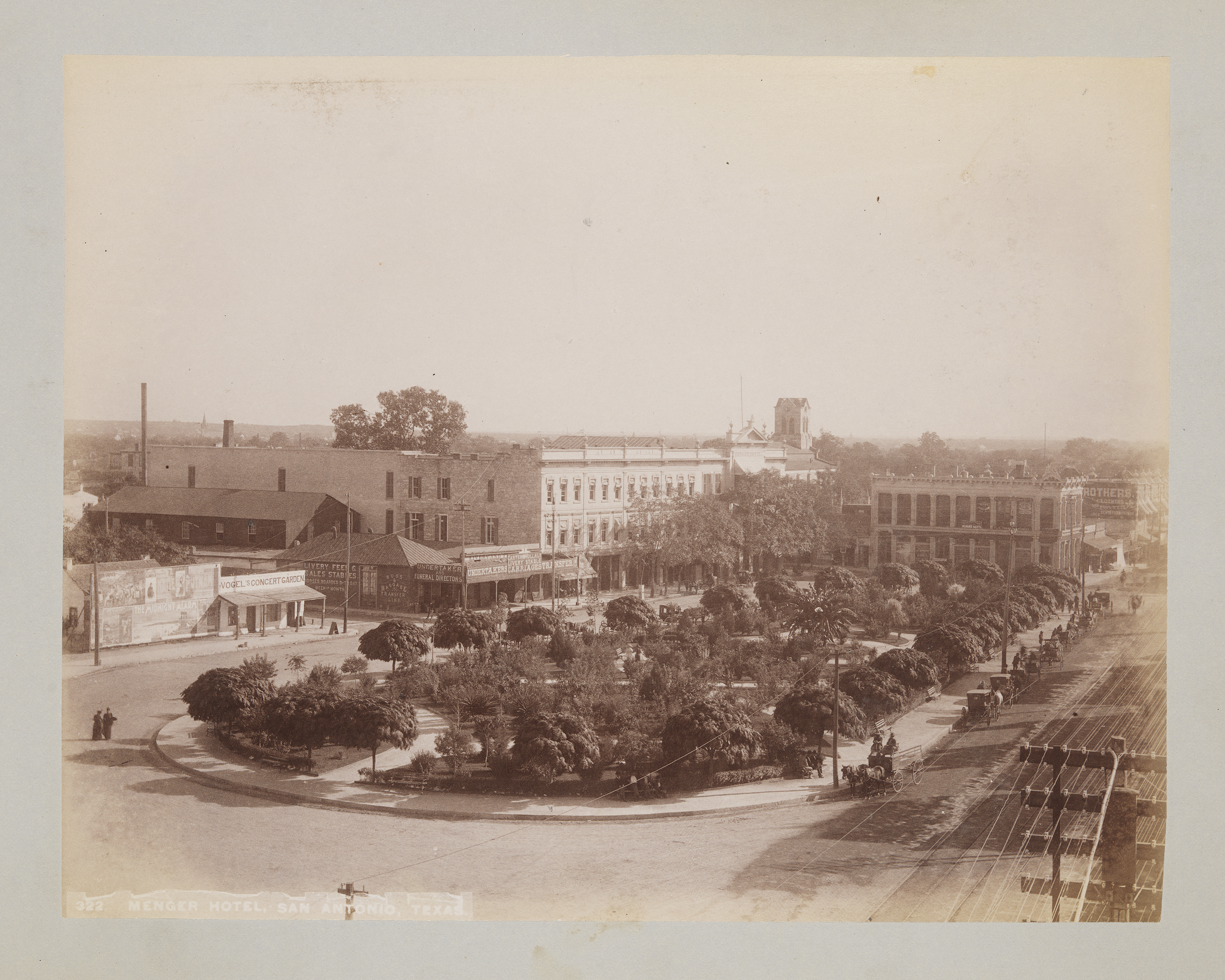
Menger Hotel (1897)

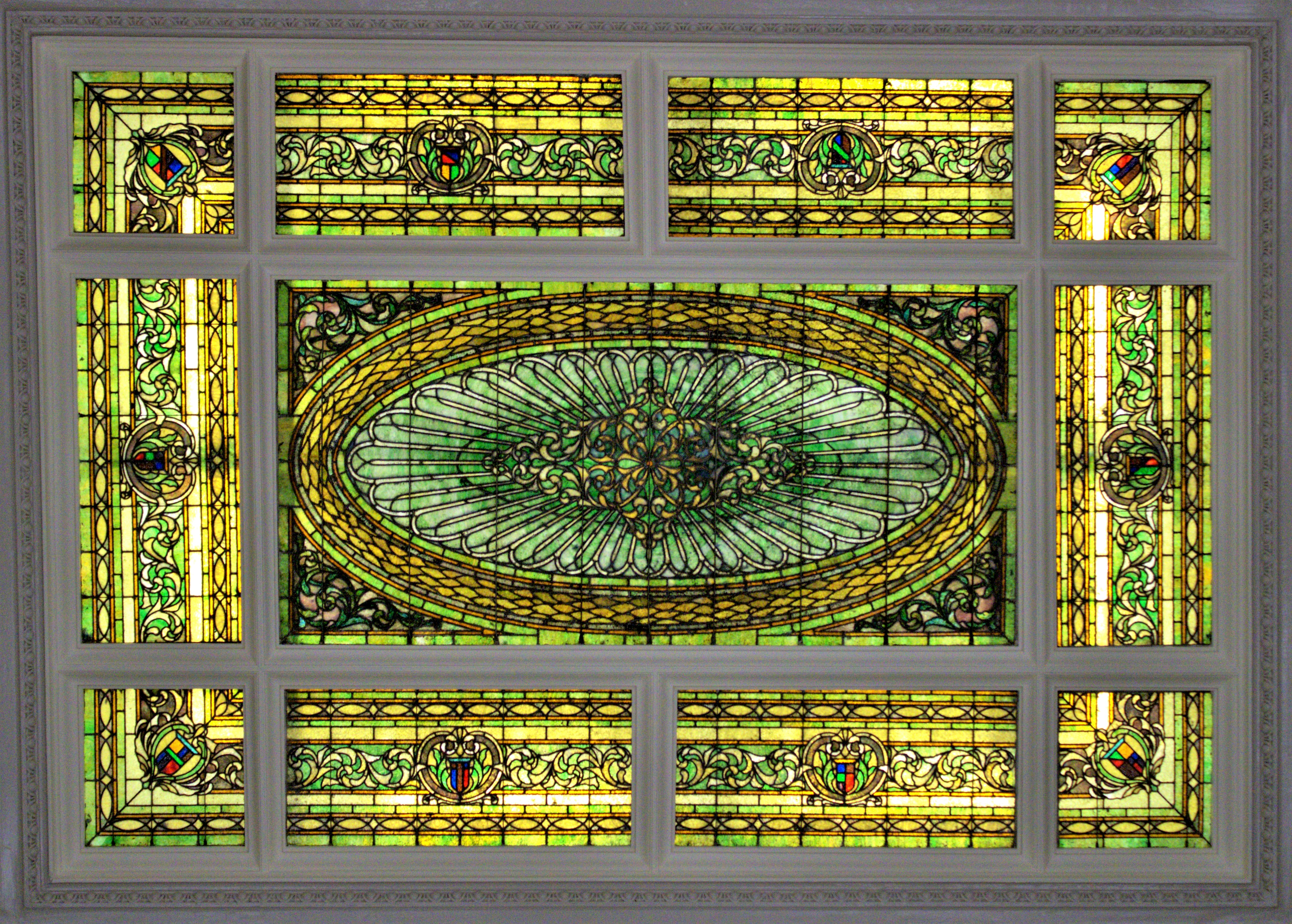
The Victorian Lobby's stained glass ceiling in 2019.

Over the hotel's history, there have been different managers and management groups of the Menger Hotel, including Major John Hermann (J.H) Kampmann, Hermann Kampmann, William Louis Moody Jr, and Hector R. Venegas. Major John Hermann (J.H) Kampmann managed the hotel from 1881 until 1943. He was the contractor who was hired in 1858 to build the hotel. During those years, he made various necessary changes to the hotel's structure. Kampmann was a builder and architect, credited with building the original Menger Hotel. Having acquired possession, Kampmann added stories and more contemporary additions to the hotel building. In response to criticism in local newspapers of the hotel's lack of amenities, Kampmann immediately began to remodel it. Soon an east wing was added, the kitchen was relocated, another lobby was added and the dining room was expanded to accommodate 160 people. The renovation added a laundry and brought piped water to every room, allowing private bathrooms, which contributed to a resurgence of the hotel's popularity, because few hotels offered such at the time.

Major Kampmann, much like William Menger, had wanted to provide an establishment that allowed travelers to stay in a hotel that delivered premium service. As documented in an 1885 survey, guests had access to a well-appointed bar room, billiard hall, and barbershop which were connected to the hotel. J.H. Kampmann eventually retired, leaving ownership of the hotel to his son Hermann Kampmann. J.H. was in Colorado Springs when he died on September 6, 1885, at age sixty-six. Like his grandfather and father, William Menger and J.H. Kampmann, Hermann Kampmann had a significant part in the hotel's management. Son of J.H. Kampmann, Hermann was a shrewd businessman whose business practices made him one of the wealthiest people in San Antonio. His father had previously made many renovations to the hotel, but Hermann felt that more additions and restorations should be made. He reportedly arranged for an architect to study the House of Lords club bar in England to create a facsimile in the hotel, and in 1887, a new saloon was added. This bar was patronized by local citizens as well as celebrities. The Menger Bar, as it is called, had "ornate mahogany tables and chairs... large mirrors... fine crystal and sterling silver." Teddy Roosevelt drank and recruited his Rough Riders there. Additionally, Hermann added a fourth floor to the Blum Street side of the hotel. The ever-growing demand for rooms became the hotel's most pressuring need. Besides the creation of the bar and an additional story added to the building, Hermann also brought the latest technology to the hotel, including a steam elevator and laundries, electric lights and an artesian well. Also around this time, a reading area was also added, where a number of early writers and chroniclers of life in the Southwestern United States who stayed at the Menger wrote and worked. By 1897 Kampmann had the kitchen remodeled once again, and included new furnishings and fixtures in the dining room.

As business began to flourish Hermann found it difficult to manage it, and turned over active management to J.W. McClean and J.H. Mudge, but retained the final say in major decisions. He died in 1902 in a horse and buggy accident. Ownership of the hotel was passed to all of the Kampmann family as there was no individual family member who wanted to take over. Although they were not interested in the hotel business they attempted to renovate the hotel in 1909 by contracting architect Alfred Giles. He was to replace the front wall with a French facade, add marble floor to the lobby, construct an arched opening from the lobby to the patio, create a patterned tile floor in the Victorian lobby and lastly create corinthian columns to the oval shaped lobby. All of these additions made the Menger Hotel the most elegant in San Antonio which was crucial to its success for new hotels were now opening around the area such as the Crockett Hotel and Gunter Hotel. In 1912, the Kampmann family employed architect Atlee B. Ayres to renovate the dining room and add 30 guestrooms.

After World War I the family could no longer provide for the hotel to host large social events and by 1929 the hotel had been so neglected that it was removed from the state guidebooks. The Great Depression also contributed to the hotel's abandonment; because few people were taking rooms, there was a lack of revenue to make needed repairs and renovations, and the hotel entered its period of so-called "declining elegance". Times were difficult for the hotel as well during World War II, so much so that plans to tear it down and replace it with a parking lot were discussed.

== Moody ownership ==
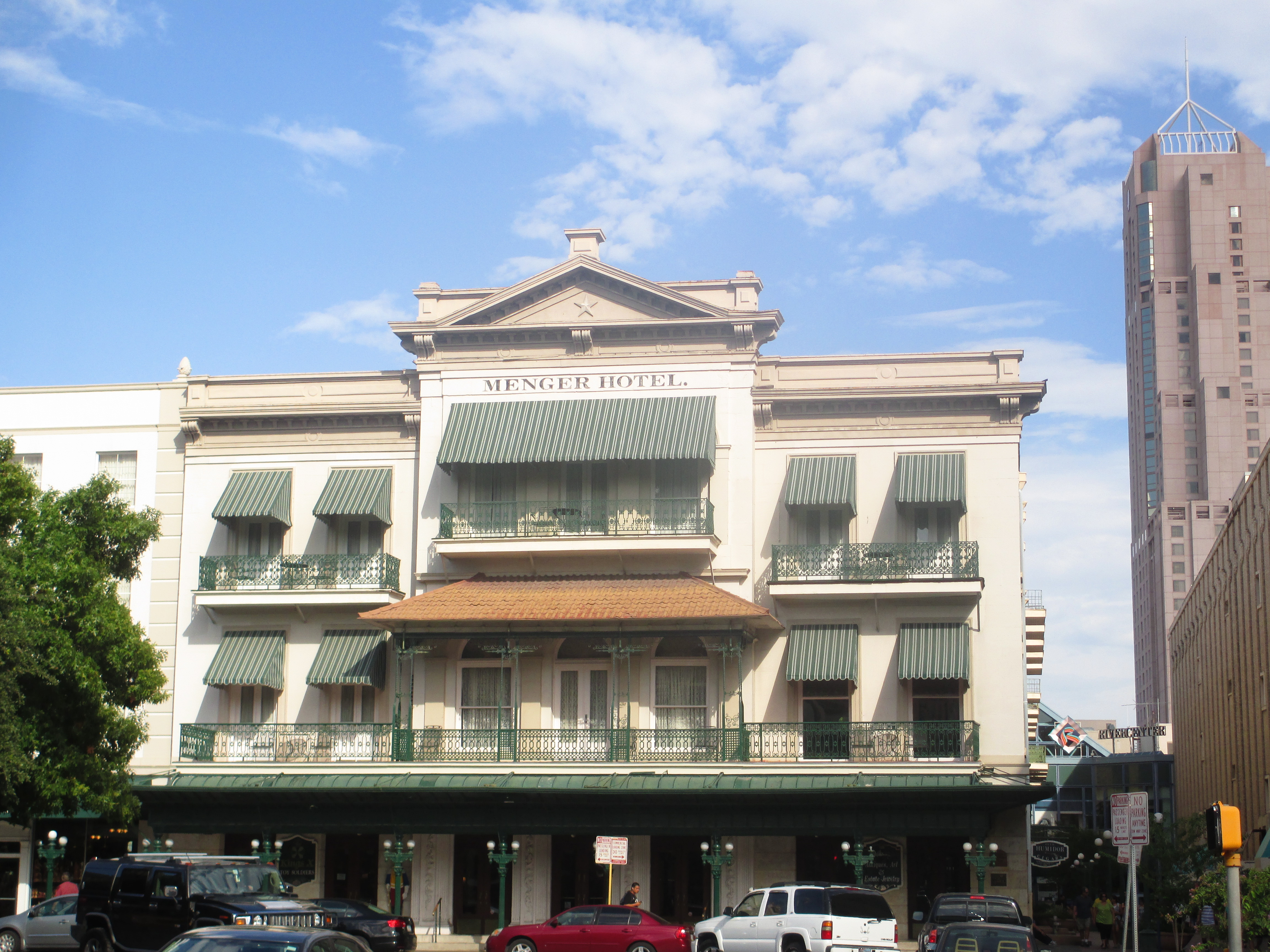
Another view of the Menger Hotel (2012)

William Lewis Moody Jr. bought the Menger Hotel in 1943, and on June 30, 1944, the National Hotel Corporation, which he had founded in 1928, took possession. Under his supervision, a complete restoration of the hotel began in 1945 after World War II ended, and by 1948, new plumbing, electrical fixtures, and building decorations had been installed and the Spanish patio gardens restored as well. The floor coverings were replaced with carpeting, guestrooms and public rooms were renovated, and $100,000 was spent on equipping a new kitchen. Moody also had the various artworks on the property restored by local artist Ernst Raba, the antique furniture was refinished and reupholstered, and lastly the colonial dining room was restored.

After all this restoration work was completed, the lobby that J.H. Kampmann had constructed in 1881 and several guestrooms above it were torn down and replaced with a new lobby and 3 floors of air-conditioned guestrooms above. In all of his plans to renovate the hotel Moody had decided to leave the original portion that William Menger had built. On March 2, 1951, Moody was recognized by the San Antonio Conservation Society for his work in remodeling the Menger and for making it a landmark in San Antonio. In 1953, a swimming pool was added to the property. Moody died at age eighty-nine in 1954, when ownership of the hotel passed to his oldest daughter Mary Moody Northen. Many other members of the Moody family were involved with operations of the Menger Hotel, and still are.

The upcoming World's Fair of 1968, dubbed the Hemisfair by local San Antonians, motivated Mary Moody Northen to spend $1.5 million on a five-story addition with 110 guestrooms to accommodate the expected tourists. This new establishment, designed by architects Atlee B. Ayres and Robert Ayres, was named the Motor Hotel, which included drive-in convenience and valet parking. In 1986 Mary Moody Northen died and ownership of the hotel passed to her nephew Robert L. Moody Jr. who became the new chairman of the Moody Foundation. By 1991 the Hotel Corporation, also known as the Gal-Tex Corporation, finished restoration of the 8,000 square feet retail space on the Alamo Plaza side of the hotel, at a cost of about $9 million.

== Famous guests ==
Over its history the Menger Hotel has been the scene for many important events, and has had many famous guests. The list of guests includes Presidents: Ulysses S. Grant, Benjamin Harrison, Theodore Roosevelt, Woodrow Wilson, William H. Taft, William McKinley, Harry S. Truman, Richard Nixon, Ronald Reagan, Lyndon B. Johnson, George H. W. Bush, and Bill Clinton; military figures, including Sam Houston, Robert E. Lee and William Hood Simpson; and other public figures, including Oscar Wilde.

== 19th-century cuisine ==
Another popular draw to the hotel during its early years was the cuisine offered by Mary Menger herself. She had long prepared meals for her guests at her boarding house and felt that doing so at the Menger Hotel as well would strengthen its appeal. Menger devised a menu for the guests that included a selection of soups, beef, pasta, veal, and a variety of desserts, all served at a single sitting. The Mengers purchased the highest-quality beef, chicken, country butter and eggs they could find at local markets, and sent out a wagon with benches that would drive around town picking up businessmen to take them to the hotel to dine. Mary Menger was also known for throwing lavish dinner parties for celebrity guests. Many of her recipes are still offered today in the hotel's Colonial Dining Room, and the mango ice cream is still popular with guests.

== Historical recognition ==
The Menger Hotel has been recognized by the state of Texas and was added to the National Register of Historic Places in 1976. It is a member of Historic Hotels of America, an official program of the National Trust for Historic Preservation. The Menger Hotel is currently owned by Galveston-based 1859 Historic Hotels, Inc., which also owns the 1909-built Crockett Hotel across the street, also adjacent to The Alamo complex.

== See also ==
- National Register of Historic Places listings in Bexar County, Texas
- Recorded Texas Historic Landmarks in Bexar County

== Bibliography ==
- "A Guide to the Menger Hotel (San Antonio, Tex.) Register, 1874." A Guide to the Menger Hotel (San Antonio, Tex.) Register, 1874. Accessed November 7, 2015.
- Alexander, Thomas E., and Dan K. Utley. Faded Glory: A Century of Forgotten Military Sites in Texas, Then and Now. College Station: Texas A&M University Press, 2012. Google Books.
- Brookins, Julia. "William Achatius Menger." In Immigrant Entrepreneurship: German-American Business Biographies, 1720 to the Present, vol.2, edited by William J. Hausman. German Historical Institute. Last modified May 21, 2013. Accessed December 3, 2015. http://immigrantentrepreneurship.org/entry.php?rec=29
- Historic plaque (Menger Hotel) outside Menger Hotel, erected in 1976, viewed 14 November 2005
- Historic plaque (Barbed Wire Demonstration) outside Menger Hotel, erected in 2000, viewed 14 November 2005
- Historic plaque (San Antonio Section, National Council of Jewish Women) outside Menger Hotel, erected in 2000, viewed 14 November 2005
- Johnson, Linda. Historic Texas Hotels and Country Inns. Burnet, Tex.: Eakin Press, 1982
- Jordan, Terry G. "GERMANS." Handbook of Texas Online. Uploaded on June 15, 2010. Published by the Texas State Historical Association. Accessed October 20, 2015. http://www.tshaonline.org/handbook/online/articles/png02
- "Journal of the Life and Culture of San Antonio." Mary Menger. Accessed November 7, 2015.
- Strumpf, Franz. San Antonio’s Menger. Abilene Christian University ILL, 1953.
- "The First Texas Brewery." The First Texas Brewery. Accessed November 7, 2015
- Williams, Docia Schultz. The History and Mystery of The Menger Hotel. Plano: Republic of Texas Press, 2000.
