= George Bickley =

George Bickley may refer to:

- George Harvey Bickley (1868–1924), American bishop of the Methodist Episcopal Church
- George W. L. Bickley (1823–1867), founder of the Knights of the Golden Circle
