= Augustus Belknap =

American Civil War veteran and railway executive

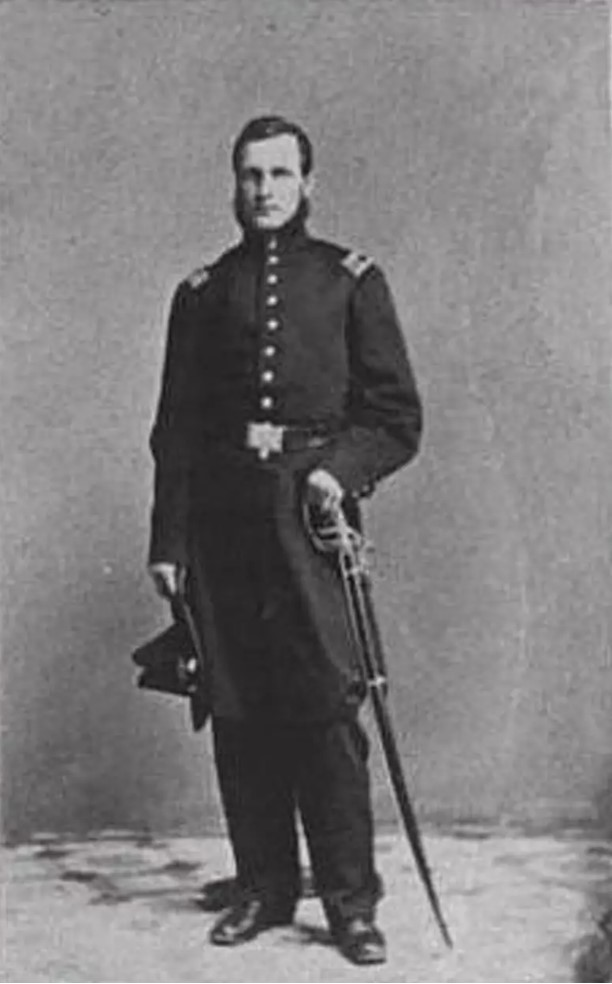
- Belknap in his Union Army officer uniform c. 1863
- Military career
- Allegiance: United States (Union)
- Branch: U.S. Army (Union Army)
- Service years: 1861–1863
- Rank: Captain (USA); Colonel (NY Natl. Guard)
- Units: 7th Regiment, New York National Guard; 67th New York Infantry Regiment
- Commands: Company E (67th NY)
- Conflicts: American Civil War; Battle of Fair Oaks (WIA); Battle of Fredericksburg
- Born: Augustus Belknap Jr. March 19, 1841; Newburgh, New York, U.S.
- Died: June 22, 1889 (aged 48); Santa Barbara, California, U.S.
- Burial place: Green-Wood Cemetery, Brooklyn, U.S. 40°39′09″N 73°59′28″W
- Political party: Republican
- Spouse: Julia Pickard (m. 1863)
- Children: 4

Augustus Belknap Jr. (March 19, 1841 – June 22, 1889) was an American civic leader of San Antonio, Civil War veteran, politician, president of the board of the San Antonio and Aransas Pass Railway, founder of the Belknap Rifles military company and the founder of the company that operated the only streetcar system in the city.

He was born in Newburgh, New York, as the son of Augustus Belknap, and moved to Texas in 1877. He founded and supported the Belknap Rifles military company, organized on October 14, 1884. It won more drill competitions than any other military company in the United States in its time. The oldest concrete street in Texas, Belknap Place in San Antonio, is named for him.

== Civil War service ==
He was educated in private military schools and worked in hardware before the Civil War from 1856 to 1861. He enlisted to the New York National Guard on April 19, 1861. After his terms of service expired, he enlisted in the U.S. Army and was in the 67th New York Infantry Regiment, seeing action in the Battle of Fair Oaks, in which he was wounded, and the Battle of Fredericksburg. He enlisted in the Army as a second lieutenant and was promoted to captain. In his obituary in the New York Herald it mentions that he served on the staff of General Alexander Shaler during the war.

== Later life ==
Belknap became a member of the Old Guard Metropolitan Regiment in New York City after the war, and later became a junior partner in the hardware firm of William S. Dodge and Company. In March 1877, he was promoted from his rank of lieutenant colonel and ordinance officer in the New York National Guard.

He moved to Texas in 1877 and lived in San Antonio. On June 22, 1878, Belknap bought all the stock in the San Antonio Street Railway System, and led the first mule-drawn car from Alamo Plaza to San Pedro Springs Park. This route developed into the first streetcar line in the city. He became the founder and president of the company that operated the city's only streetcar system. He also was a director of the San Antonio Fair Association and president and director of the Opera House Company.

Belknap was elected to be an alderman from the second ward of San Antonio in 1883 and 1885. Belknap was a member of the first board of the San Antonio and Aransas Pass Railway when it was chartered on August 28, 1884. He founded the Belknap Rifles on October 14, 1884, financing the military company for twenty to thirty young men who were denied admission to the San Antonio Rifles. He was an alderman at-large in 1887. He resigned later in 1887 to run for the 10th congressional district. He ran for the seat in Texas's 10th congressional district in the 51st Congress as a Republican, against incumbent Joseph D. Sayers, losing to the congressman who would later on become the governor of Texas.

He died while on a trip to Santa Barbara, California, on June 22, 1889, of ulcerative colitis. He was buried in the Green-Wood Cemetery in Brooklyn.

Belknap Place, a thoroughfare in San Antonio's Monte Vista Historic District connecting the northern edge of San Antonio College, Temple Beth-El and Hildebrand Avenue, that is the oldest concrete street in Texas is named for him.

== Bibliography ==
- "Annual Report of the Adjutant-General". Documents of the Assembly of the State of New York, One Hundred and First Session.—1878. Jerome B. Permenter, State Printer. 1878.
- Daniell, Lewis E. (1889). Personnel of the Texas State Government, with sketches of Distinguished Texans embracing the Executive and Staff, Heads of the Departments, United States Senators and Representatives, Members of the Twenty-First Legislature. Austin: Smith, Hicks and Jones, State Printers.

Party political offices
| Preceded by James P. Newcomb | Republican nominee for Texas's 10th congressional district 1888 | Succeeded by Austin M. Robinson |
Political offices
| Preceded by Office established | Alderman At-large of San Antonio; 1887 | Succeeded by J. H. Schaefer |
| Preceded by W. R. Story | Alderman of the Second Ward of San Antonio; 1883–1887 | Succeeded by James H. French |
