= Alamo, Texas (disambiguation) =

Alamo, Texas is a town located in Hidalgo County, Texas, U.S.A.

Alamo, Texas may also refer to:

- Alamo Plaza Historic District, a historical district in downtown San Antonio, Texas
  - Alamo Mission in San Antonio, former Spanish Catholic mission and now a museum
  - Battle of the Alamo, battle during the 19th-century Texas Revolution
- Alamo Heights, Texas, an incorporated city in Bexar County
- The Alamo Colleges, a system of community colleges in the San Antonio vicinity
