= George W. L. Bickley =

Public figure in 19th century United States

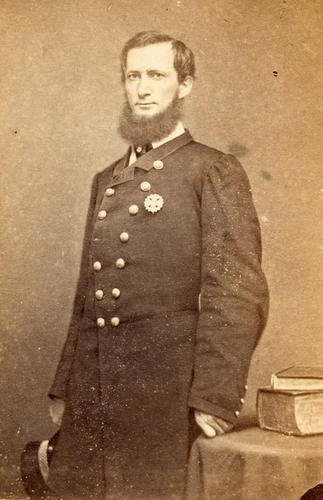
- Born: George Washington Lafayette Bickley; July 18, 1823; Russell County, Virginia, U.S.
- Died: August 10, 1867 (aged 44); Baltimore, Maryland or Virginia, U.S.
- Occupation: Physician
- Military career
- Allegiance: Confederate States of America, Knights of the Golden Circle
- Branch: Confederate States Army
- Service years: 1863–1865
- Rank: Surgeon

George Washington Lafayette Bickley (July 18, 1823 – August 10, 1867) was the founder of the Knights of the Golden Circle, a Civil War era secret society used to promote the interests of the Southern United States by preparing the way for annexation of a "golden circle" of territories in Mexico, Central America, and the Caribbean which would be included into the United States as southern or slave states. Bickley was arrested by the United States government as a Confederate spy in July 1863, and was jailed without trial until October 1865. During this time he wrote a letter to Abraham Lincoln expressing his distaste for Lincoln's handling of the government.

== Life and career ==
Bickley was born in Russell County, Virginia on July 18, 1823. His father died of cholera in 1830 and Bickley ran away from home to live an adventurous life around the country.

=== Medicine ===
By 1850, Bickley was a practicing medical doctor in Jeffersonville (now Tazewell), Virginia. In Jeffersonville, he founded a local historical society and began writing the manuscript for the History of the Settlement and Indian War of Tazewell County, Virginia.

In 1851, Bickley moved to Cincinnati, Ohio, after being offered to serve as "Professor of Materia Medica, Therapeutics, and Medical Botany" at the Eclectic Medical Institute, an institution teaching a form of alternative medicine known as eclectic medicine. Bickley had secured the offer by claiming to have been a graduate in the Class of 1842 of the University of London. Bickley stated that he had studied medicine under the renowned English physician John Elliotson, who supposedly had signed his diploma. The University of London failed to find Bickley's name in their records for the list of university graduates. Furthermore, Elliotson had resigned from the university in 1838, which would falsify Bickley's claim.

=== Writing ===
In 1853, Bickley published Adalaska; Or, The Strange and Mysterious Family of the Cave of Genreva, an anti-slavery novel based on the premise of the Young America movement and Manifest Destiny, and the Principles of Scientific Botany. Bickley was also the publisher of the Western American Review, a New York-based conservative publication.

=== The Knights of the Golden Circle ===
Hounded by creditors, Bickley left Cincinnati in the late 1850s and traveled through the East and South promoting an expedition to seize Mexico and establish a new territory for slavery. He found his greatest support in Texas and managed within a short time to organize 32 chapters there. In the spring of 1860 the group made the first of two attempts to invade Mexico from Texas. A small band reached the Rio Grande, but Bickley failed to show up with a large force he claimed he was assembling in New Orleans, and the campaign dissolved. In April, some KGC members in New Orleans, displeased with Bickley's inept leadership, met and expelled him, but Bickley called a convention in Raleigh, North Carolina, in May and succeeded in having himself reinstated as the group's leader. Following the outbreak of the American Civil War, numerous Golden Circle members became focused on making the New Mexico territory a part of the proposed Golden Circle. In May 1861, members of the KGC and Confederate Rangers attacked a building in Texas which housed a pro-Union newspaper, the Alamo Express, owned by J. P. Newcomb, and burned it down.

KGC members largely aligned with Copperhead politicians who wanted a negotiated end to the war. In late 1863, the Knights of the Golden Circle were reorganized (sans Bickley) as the Order of American Knights and again, early in 1864, as the Order of the Sons of Liberty, with Clement Vallandigham, the most prominent of the Copperheads, as its supreme commander, dissolved in 1864 after being exposed and members arrested and tried for treason.

=== American Civil War ===
Bickley joined the Confederate States Army at the beginning of 1863 to serve as a surgeon for a North Carolina regiment under General Braxton Bragg. However, he left for Tennessee in June 1863, and he was arrested as a Confederate spy in New Albany, Indiana, in July 1863. He was never tried but remained under arrest until October 1865.

== Personal life, death and legacy ==
In 1850, Bickley's wife of two years died, and he left their young son in the care of another family. He moved to Cincinnati the following year, and married a widow who owned a farm in Scioto County, Ohio. They separated when he tried to sell her farm. In 1863, he had a child out of wedlock with a woman in Tennessee.

Bickley died on August 10, 1867, either in Virginia or Baltimore, Maryland. Meanwhile, the Knights of the Golden Circle became a model for the creation of the Ku Klux Klan.
