= Knights of the Golden Circle =

Secret society in the mid-19th-century US

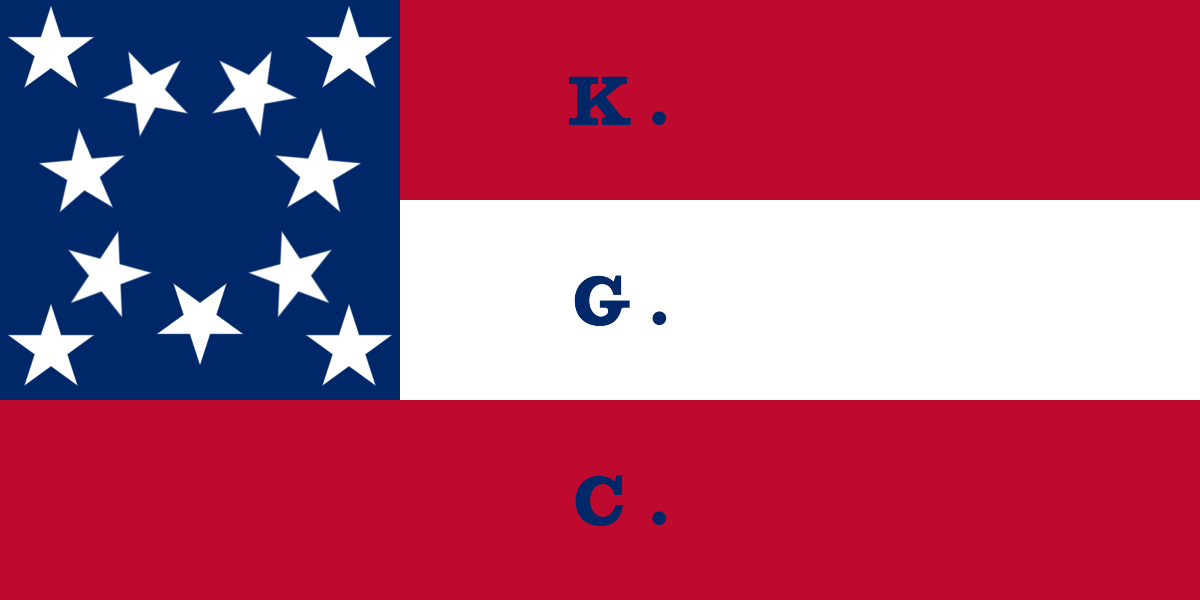
- Flag
- Abbreviation: KGC
- Formation: July 4, 1854; 172 years ago
- Dissolved: 1863; 163 years ago
- Type: Paramilitary
- Purpose: Expansion of slavery; Imperialism; Annexation of the "golden circle"; Secession
- Headquarters: Cincinnati, Ohio, United States
- Official language: English
- Leader: George W. L. Bickley

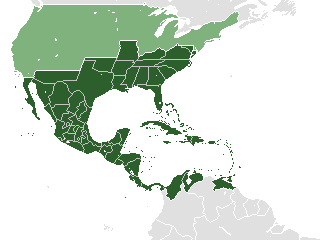
Map of the proposed "Golden Circle" in dark green. Light green designates the remnants of the United States.

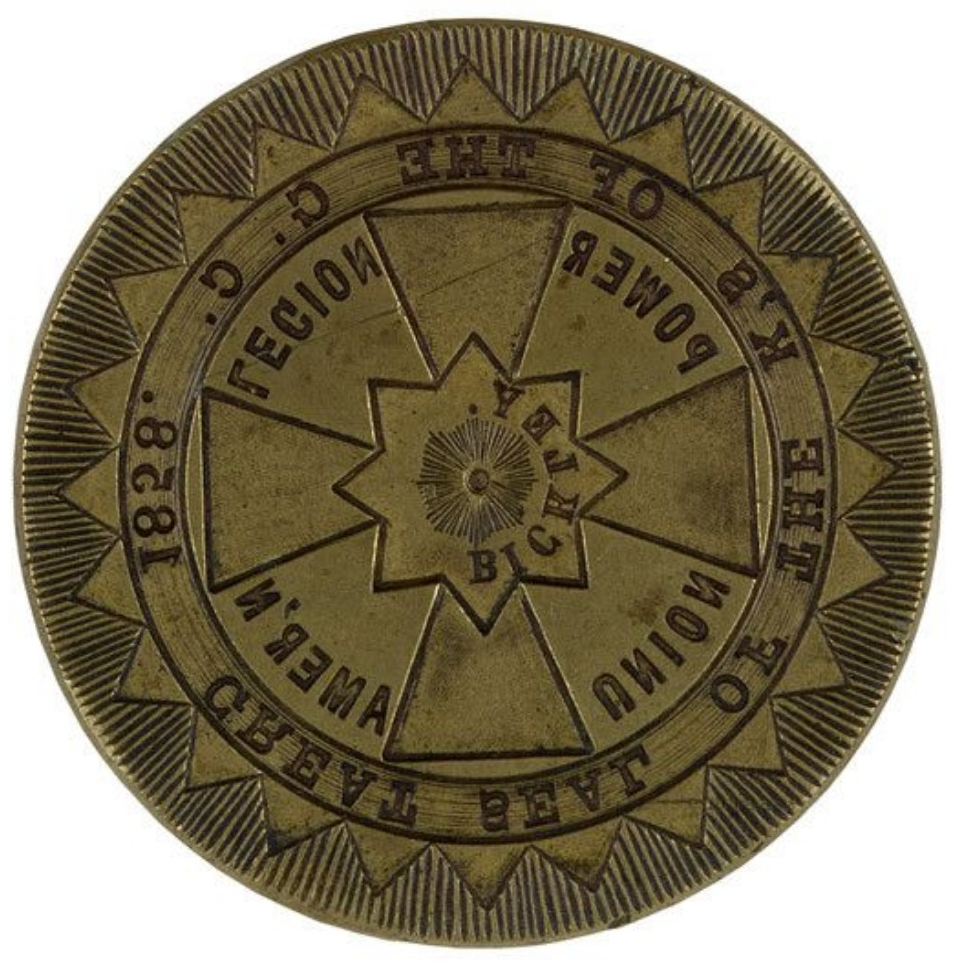
Seal of the president of the Knights of the Golden Circle, National Archives

The Knights of the Golden Circle (KGC) was a secret society founded in 1854 by American George W. L. Bickley. Its objective was initially to expand the United States into Latin America, adding slave states and ensuring the permanent continuance of slavery. This later became a plan for the southern states to secede and then add Latin American territory. The "golden circle" referred to a circle of 16 degrees radius (about 2400 miles) centered on Havana, and covering territories whose climate was suitable for large-scale plantation agriculture. It would have consisted of the Southern United States, Mexico, Central America, Cuba, Haiti, the Dominican Republic, Caribbean South America and most other islands in the Caribbean, resulting, according to Bickley, in 25 new slave states.

The KGC's proposal grew out of previously unsuccessful proposals to annex Cuba (the Ostend Manifesto), parts of Central America (the Filibuster War), and all of Mexico (the All of Mexico Movement). In Cuba, the issue was complicated by the desire of many in the colony for independence from Spain. Mexico and Central America had no interest in being part of the United States. Initially, the KGC advocated that the United States should annex the new territories to increase the number of slavery states vastly, and thus the power of slaveholders.

In response to the increased anti-slavery agitation that followed the Dred Scott decision (1857), the Knights changed their position: the Southern United States should secede, forming their own confederation, and then invade and annex the other areas of the Golden Circle. The proposed new country's northern border would roughly coincide with the Mason–Dixon line, and within it were included such cities as Washington, D.C., St. Louis, Mexico City, and Panama City. In either case, the goal was to increase slavers' political and economic power irreversibly.

During the American Civil War, some Southern sympathizers in Old Northwest states such as Ohio, Illinois, Indiana, Minnesota, and Iowa, proposed the creation of a "Northwest Confederacy" which would make peace with the South and recreate the Union without the New England states. The KGC formed new chapters in the Midwest to encourage this.

The KGC was later renamed first the Order of American Knights, and then, in a deliberate reference to the Sons of Liberty of the American Revolution, the Order of the Sons of Liberty.

The KGC has been called a "model" for the Ku Klux Klan. Although nominally secret societies, the actual existence of the Knights of the Golden Circle and the Order of the Sons of Liberty were never considered a secret.

== Background ==
European colonialism and dependence on slavery had declined more rapidly in some countries than in others. The Spanish possessions of Cuba and Puerto Rico and the Empire of Brazil continued to depend on slavery, as did the Southern United States. In the years before the American Civil War, the rise of support for the abolition of slavery was one of several divisive issues in the United States. The slave population there had continued to grow due to natural increase even after the ban on international trade. It was concentrated in the Deep South on large plantations devoted to cotton and sugar cane commodity crops. Still, it was the basis of agricultural and other labor throughout the southern states.

Prior to the formal foundation of the KGC, as early as 1834, there were numerous unaffiliated so-called "Southern Rights Clubs" throughout the South. These clubs created programs for the development of the South, advocated for the reopening of the slave trade – one went so far as to man and equip a slaver ship – and pushed for the extension of slavery into the organized territories of the United States. The clubs, which met regularly, had secret signs by which members could recognize each other.

== Early history ==
George Washington Lafayette Bickley, a doctor, newspaper editor, adventurer, and "somewhat itinerant promoter" who was born in Virginia and lived in Cincinnati, Ohio, founded the association, organizing the first castle, or local branch, in Cincinnati in 1854. However, records of the KGC convention held in 1860 state that the organization "originated at Lexington, Kentucky, on the fourth day of July 1854, by five gentlemen who came together on a call made by Gen. George Bickley". Hounded by creditors, Bickley left Cincinnati in the late 1850s and traveled through the eastern and southern United States, promoting an armed expedition to Mexico.

The KGC's original goal was to colonize the northern part of Mexico and add it to the U.S. as multiple states, either by negotiation with Mexican President Benito Juarez, or by force; part of the West Indies would also be annexed. This would expand the power of the slavery states, which was felt to be jeopardized by the growing population and power of the northern states. Potentially 25 new slave states could be added to the U.S. If the northern states refused to acquiesce to these annexations, the new territory could be added to the Southern states, creating a tropical empire, a "golden circle".

The membership of the KGC, scattered from New York to California and into Latin America, was never large. Bickley received little encouragement on this journey, except in Texas, since attention in the South was focused on the 1860 United States presidential election and the possible election of a slave-owning Democrat, John C. Breckinridge.

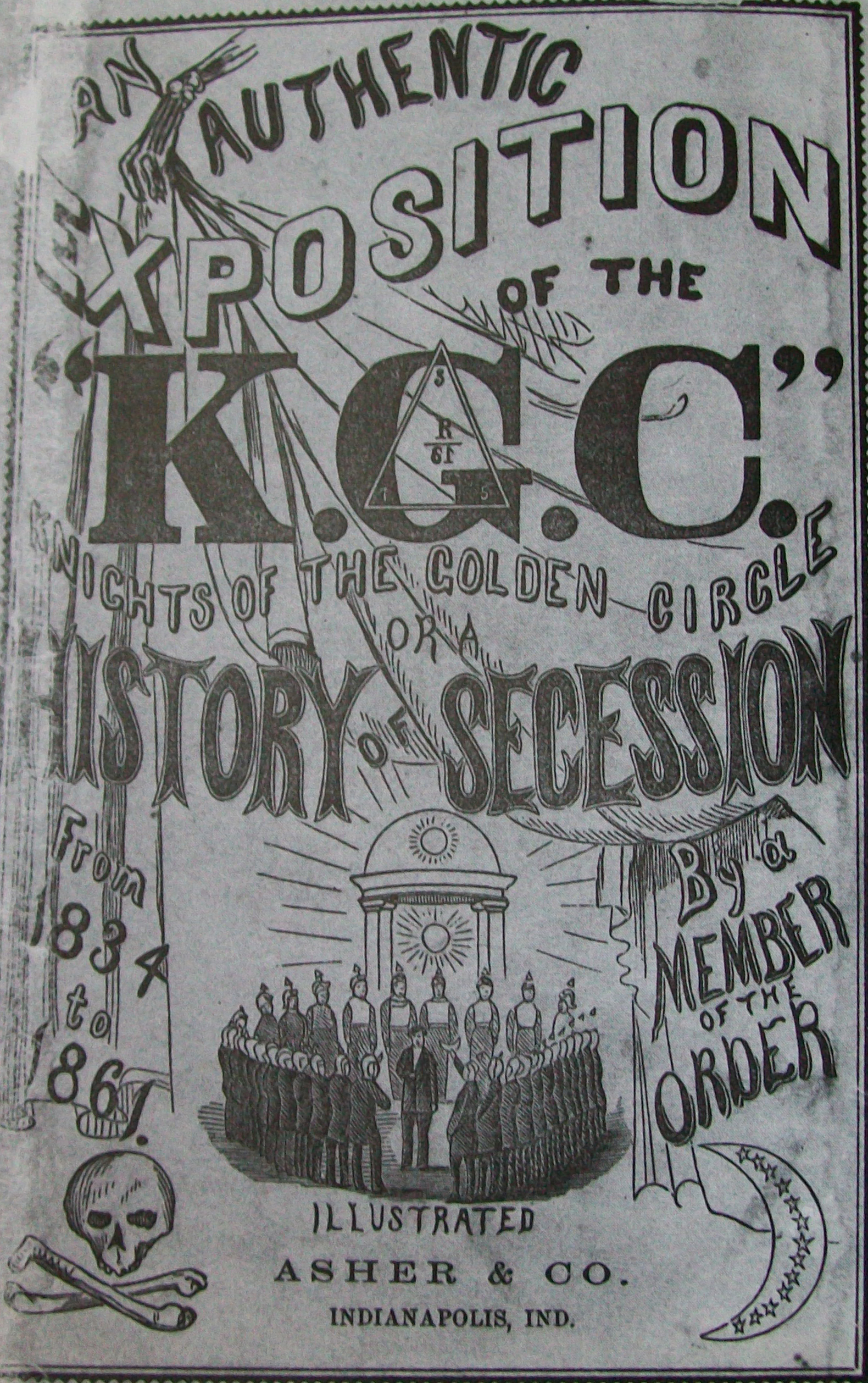
An alleged secret history of the Knights of the Golden Circle published in 1863

The KGC remained fairly obscure until 1858, when it began to be heavily promoted. An organizational meeting was held in White Sulphur Springs, Virginia in August 1859, and the group began to grow quickly afterwards, so that by October 1860 it had spread throughout the South and claimed a membership of 65,000, including some members of President James Buchanan's cabinet and all except three of the slave state governors.

Other meetings were held in Raleigh, North Carolina in May 1860, at which time rumors that Bickley was a fraud and an imposter were put to rest. Another meeting in Atlanta, Georgia, also in 1860, generated much enthusiasm for the KGC. Bickley, styling himself "President General of the American Legion, K.G.C.", continued to tour the South making speeches, holding meetings, and proselytizing for the group.

Since it was a secret society, its actual numbers cannot be known with any accuracy. In November 1860, Bickley claimed 115,000 members for the group, but historians believe this number is exaggerated. Bickley also claimed that it contained most of the important men and leading citizens of the South, and some former members support this claim, with John C. Breckenridge, Robert Toombs, and John B. Floyd being touted as members. At least one historian, Ollinger Crenshaw, has debunked the claim that the membership was prominent, and another former member described the membership as "broken down hacks, gamblers, and drunkards." William L. Yancey, however, is known to have joined around the time of the 1860 Democratic National Convention in Charleston, South Carolina.

Sympathy for the goals of the KGC was widespread in the South, even by people who were not necessarily members of the group. A few days after Lincoln's election, Robert Barnwell Rhett, who has been called "the father of secession", said:

We will expand, as our growth and civilization shall demand—over Mexico—over the isles of the sea—over the far-off Southern tropics—until we shall establish a great Confederation of Republics—the greatest, freest and most useful the world has ever seen.

In August 1861, The New York Times described the order as a successor to the Order of the Lone Star, which had been organized to conquer Cuba and Nicaragua, succeeding in the latter cause in 1856 under William Walker before being driven out by a coalition of neighboring states. At that time, the order's prime objective was said to be to raise an army of 16,000 men to conquer and "Southernize" Mexico, which meant making slavery, not legal in Mexico, again legal while supporting the "Knights of the Columbian Star"—those in the KGC's highest level of membership—for public office.

In the North, the KGC was cited by a Senator from Wisconsin as an exemplar of "Southern fanaticism", an exposé of the organization was published in Indiana in 1861, and its secret rituals were publicized in Boston in that year as well. Some members active in northern states, such as Illinois, were accused of anti-Union activities after the Civil War began in 1861.

Historian David M. Potter commented that the KGC played no role in either forming or supporting the Confederate States of America.

=== Name ===
The name "Knights of the Golden Circle" was based on the concept of a "Golden Circle", with its center at Havana and a radius of 16 degrees, which would contain the source of much of the world's cotton, tobacco, and sugar, and some of the best coffee and rice. This "golden" land of precious commodities was conceived to be the center of slavery in the world as well, as the slaves were needed to produce these riches.

=== Organization ===
The KGC was organized in three overall degrees, as well as into local "castles". At the top was the political degree, the Knights of the Colombian Star, the ruling leaders of the group. Below them was the financial degree, the True Faith, those responsible for funding the organization. Entry-level members were part of the Knights of the Iron Hand, the military degree. These men would be the troops that would fight for the KGC in the insurrections and invasions they intended to mount, and provide defense when necessary. The South would be divided into military districts headed by a Colonel, who was responsible for raising a quota of men to make up the 4,200 planned for the invasion of Mexico. Each local "castle" was required to perform military drills in preparation.

=== Membership requirements ===
The initiation ritual of the KGC began: "the first field of our operations is in Mexico; but we hold it to be our duty to offer our services to any Southern State to repel a Northern army ... The Southern States must foster any scheme having for its object the Americanization and Southernization of Mexico. ..." Numbers were used to represent important places and phrases.

It was specified that candidates must have been born in a Slave State, or if born in a Free State must live in the South and be a whole-hearted supporter of the Constitutional rights of the Southern slaveholders. The candidate must be a citizen, and a Protestant. A candidate who was born in a Slave State need not be a Slaveholder "provided he can give Evidence of character as a Southern man." Initiates had to swear that "should my State or any other Southern State be invaded by Abolitionists I will muster the largest force I can, and go to the scene of the danger."

== Plot to replace Lincoln with Breckinridge ==
Several members of President James Buchanan's administration were members of the order, as well as Virginia's secessionist Senator James M. Mason. The Secretary of War, John Floyd and of Treasury, Howell Cobb, were members of the circle, in addition to Vice President John Breckinridge.

Floyd received instructions from the Order to "seize Navy-yards, Forts, etc. while KGC members were still Cabinet officers and Senators". The plan was to prevent Lincoln from reaching Washington by capturing him in Baltimore, a city with strong Southern sympathies, where the transfer of Lincoln's train from one railroad line to another had to be done by having horses pull the train cars through the street, presenting an opportunity to kill or kidnap Lincoln. Having disposed of the president-elect, the District of Columbia would be occupied, and Breckinridge installed as president.

This plot was just one of the various conspiracies investigated by the Pinkerton Detective Agency, acting as railroad security for part of Lincoln's trip from Springfield, Illinois to Washington to be inaugurated.

== Civil War ==
With the onset of the American Civil War, it was difficult for the KGC to garner support for their filibustering schemes, since the South needed to expend its resources on preparing for war with the Union. Several KGC "castles" joined the Confederate Army as a group, and in early 1863 Bickley gave up his leadership of the organization to become a surgeon in a regiment from North Carolina. He also attempted to organize antiwar groups in the North. He was arrested by the Union as a Confederate spy in 1863, and was jailed until October 1865 without being tried.

=== Southwest ===
In 1859, future Confederate States Army brigadier general Elkanah Greer established KGC castles in East Texas and Louisiana. Although a Unionist, United States Senator Sam Houston introduced a resolution in the U.S. Senate in 1858 for the "United States to declare and maintain an efficient protectorate over the States of Mexico, Nicaragua, Costa Rica, Guatemala, Honduras, and San Salvador." This measure, which supported the goal of the KGC, failed to be adopted. In the spring of 1860, Elkanah Greer had become general and grand commander of 4,000 Military Knights in the KGC's Texas division of 21 castles. The Texas KGC supported President of the United States James Buchanan's policy of, and draft treaty for, protecting routes for U.S. commerce across Mexico, which also failed to be approved by the U.S. Senate.

With the election of Abraham Lincoln as President of the United States, the Texas KGC changed its emphasis from a plan to expand U.S. territory into Mexico to focus its efforts on providing support for the Southern States' declared secession from the United States. On February 15, 1861, Ben McCulloch, United States Marshal and former Texas Ranger, began marching toward the U.S. Army arsenal at San Antonio, Texas, with a cavalry force of about 550 men, about 150 of whom were Knights of the Golden Circle (KGC) from six castles. As volunteers continued to join McCulloch the following day, United States Army Brevet Maj. Gen. David E. Twiggs surrendered the arsenal peacefully to the secessionists. Twiggs was appointed a major general in the Confederate States Army on May 22, 1861.

KGC members also figured prominently among those who, in 1861, joined Lt. Col. John Robert Baylor in his temporarily successful takeover of southern New Mexico Territory. In May 1861, members of the KGC and the Confederate Rangers attacked a building that housed a pro-Union newspaper, the Alamo Express, owned by J. P. Newcomb, and burned it down. Other KGC members followed Brig. Gen. Henry Hopkins Sibley on the 1862 New Mexico Campaign, which sought to bring the New Mexico Territory into the Confederate fold. Both Baylor and Trevanion Teel, Sibley's captain of artillery, had been among the KGC members who rode with Ben McCulloch.

=== North ===
In early 1862, Radical Republicans in the Senate, aided by Secretary of State William H. Seward, suggested that former president Franklin Pierce, who was exceedingly critical of the Lincoln administration's war policies, was an active member of the Knights of the Golden Circle. In an angry letter to Seward, Pierce denied that he knew anything about the KGC and demanded that his letter be made public. California Senator Milton Latham subsequently did so when he entered the entire Pierce–Seward correspondence into the Congressional Globe.

Appealing to the Confederacy's friends in the North and the border states, the Order spread to Kentucky and Tennessee, as well as the southern parts of such Union states as Indiana, Ohio, Illinois, and Missouri. It became strongest among Copperheads, who were Democrats who wanted to end the Civil War by a settlement with the South. Some supported slavery, and others were worried about the power of the federal government. In the summer of 1863, Congress authorized a military draft, which the administration soon put into operation. Leaders of the Democratic Party opposed to Abraham Lincoln's administration denounced the draft and other wartime measures, such as the arrest of seditious persons and the president's temporary suspension of the writ of habeas corpus.

During the 1863 Gettysburg campaign, scam artists in south-central Pennsylvania sold Pennsylvania Dutch farmers $1 (~$26.00 in 2025) paper tickets purported to be from the Knights of the Golden Circle. Along with a series of secret hand gestures, these tickets were supposed to protect the horses and other possessions of ticket holders from seizure by invading Confederate soldiers. When Confederate Maj. Gen. Jubal Early's infantry division passed through York County, Pennsylvania, they took what they needed anyway. They often paid with Confederate States dollars or with drafts on the Confederate government. The Confederate cavalry commander J. E. B. Stuart also reported the alleged KGC tickets when documenting the campaign.

That same year, Asbury Harpending and California members of the Knights of the Golden Circle in San Francisco outfitted the schooner J. M. Chapman as a Confederate privateer in San Francisco Bay, with the object of raiding commerce on the Pacific Coast and capturing gold shipments to the East Coast. Their attempt was detected and they were seized on the night of their intended departure.

=== Reorganization ===
In late 1863, the KGC faded away after its ties with the Confederacy were disclosed. It reorganized as the Order of American Knights, with membership largely centered in the southern Midwest. In February 1864, it became the Order of the Sons of Liberty, with the Ohio politician Clement Vallandigham, the most prominent of the anti-war Copperheads, as its Supreme Grand Commander. In most areas, only a minority of its membership was radical enough to discourage enlistments, resist the draft, and shield deserters. The organization held numerous peace meetings.

Agents of the Federal government managed to infiltrate the Sons of Liberty, and documented charges against it, including an attempt to capture a Union warship on Lake Erie, attempts to release Confederate prisoners from a number of Midwestern prison camps, planning the Northwest Conspiracy, which plotted regime change uprisings aimed at forcibly bringing Iowa, Ohio, Illinois, and Indiana into the Confederacy, the burning of the Walnut Ridge Friends Meetinghouse in Rush County, Indiana, a plot to burn Northern cities, and generally attempting to create so much chaos in the North that Union troops would have to be removed from the front lines to deal with it. Arrests were made connected with these and other schemes, especially in Indiana, including that of Lambdin Milligan whose conviction by a military tribunal was reversed by the United States Supreme Court in 1868 on the basis that civilians could not be tried by military courts while civil courts were operating.

The charges against the Sons of Liberty were widely publicized and used against the Democrats in the 1864 Presidential campaign. In Republican speeches, newspapers and pamphlets, Democrats were linked to these treasonous activities, with headlines such as "Rebellion in the North!! Extraordinary Disclosure! Val[landigham]'s Plan to Overthrow the Government! Peace Party Plot!" and pamphlets with titles like Copperhead Conspiracy in the North-West: An Expose of the Treasonable Order of the Sons of Liberty. In this way, Republicans managed to associate the entire Democratic party with its Copperhead anti-war faction. Although the Republicans undoubtedly exaggerated or even invented some of their claims for propaganda purposes, and some historians go so far as to discount them entirely, official reports of Confederate agents in captured Confederate archives support a number of the allegations, including Southern money paying for peace conferences, bribes to candidates, and a caches of weapons found in the homes of Copperheads. In addition, Sterling Price, who was the "Military Commander" of the Order of the American Knights, invaded Missouri from Arkansas in September 1864 with 12,000 men.

== Influence ==
In The Idea of a Southern Nation (1979), historian John McCardell called the KGC "that most bizarre offshoot of Southern expansionism." He wrote:

In reality, the influence of the K.G.C. was practically nonexistent. ... Viewed in isolation, the K.G.C. would seem to be an aberration hardly deserving attention. But viewed in the context of the developments of the 1850s, the organization seems perhaps the logical extension of Southern expansionist rhetoric."

== Members and alleged members ==
George W. L. Bickley founded the KGC, is therefore a known member, but as a secret society, its membership cannot be known with accuracy. The following people have been suggested as possibly having been members, with varying degrees of certainty. (Note: only reliably sourced names can be included in this list):

- Asbury Harpending, a San Francisco financier, who joined in a failed conspiracy to create a "Pacific Republic" in California and Oregon, and with other members of the KGC outfitted a schooner as a Confederate privateer.
- John Wilkes Booth, assassin of Abraham Lincoln; other conspirators may also have been members.
- John C. Breckinridge, Vice President of the United States before the Civil War, and the candidate of the Southern Democrats in the 1860 presidential election won by Lincoln.
- Howell Cobb, Secretary of the Treasury under U.S. President James Buchanan.
- John B. Floyd, 31st Governor of Virginia and U.S. Secretary of War under James Buchanan, who preceded Lincoln as president; after secession, he became a Confederate General.
- Nathan Bedford Forrest, a slave trader who became a Confederate General, and later the first Grand Wizard of the Ku Klux Klan.
- Parker H. French, adventurer, entrepreneur, swindler and spy for the confederacy. French had interest in the KGC and was tried, but was not convicted, of being a member.
- Elkanah Greer, an antebellum cotton planter and merchant, and then a general in the Confederate States Army.
- Sam Houston, a leader of the Americans in the war for Texas' independence from Mexico, later a U.S. Senator and governor of the state of Texas at the time of secession.
- Jesse James, Confederate "bushwhacker" who after the Civil War robbed trains and banks. Other members of the James-Younger Gang may also have been involved in the KGC.
- Lambdin P. Milligan, an extreme Northern states rights advocate and opponent of Lincoln's conduct of the Civil War; a leader of the Order of American Knights, a successor to the KGC. He was arrested in 1864 on numerous charges in connection with a conspiracy to obstruct the war effort and raise rebellion in Indiana, and was found guilty by a military tribunal and sentenced to death. The conviction was overturned by the U.S. Supreme Court on the grounds that civil courts were in operation, so trial by military tribunal was unconstitutional.
- John S. Marmaduke, an officer in the antebellum U.S. Army, he became a Confederate general of cavalry in the Trans-Mississippi; later he was the 25th Governor of Missouri.
- James M. Mason, secessionist U.S. Senator from Virginia, later a Confederate diplomat assigned to encourage Britain and France to recognize the Confederacy as an independent nation.
- Cynthia Charlotte "Lottie" Moon, a Confederate spy who lived in Ohio, she was active in supporting the KGC and other similar organizations, but as a woman it was unlikely that she was an actual member.
- Buckner Stith Morris, a Chicago politician who opposed the Civil War, and appeared to sympathize with the Copperheads, anti-war Democrats.
- Albert Pike, an American author, poet, orator, editor, lawyer, jurist and Confederate States Army general who served as an associate justice of the Arkansas Supreme Court in exile from 1864 to 1865.
- Joseph O. Shelby, a wealthy businessman from Kentucky who participated in Bleeding Kansas as an advocate of slavery; after secession he became a Confederate officer who commanded cavalry in the Trans-Mississippi.
- John Surratt, a Confederate spy who was accused of plotting with John Wilkes Booth to kidnap U.S. President Abraham Lincoln; he was also suspected of involvement in the Lincoln assassination.
- Robert Toombs, a U.S. Senator, who became the first Secretary of State of the Confederacy, and later a Brigadier General in the rebel army.
- John Allen Wilcox, a politician who served in the U.S. House of Representatives and, after secession, in the Confederate Congress.
- William L. Yancey, a well-known and influential "fire-eater" who campaigned vigorously for Southern independence.

== In popular culture ==
- In November 1950, the anthology radio drama Destination Freedom recapped the early history of the Knights in the episode "The Golden Circle".
- In the novel Bring the Jubilee (1953) by Ward Moore, a victorious Confederacy annexes all of Latin America in the late 19th century (renaming Mexico City as "Leesburg"), leading to a mid-20th-century cold war with the German Empire, the world's only other superpower.
- The Night of the Iron Tyrants (1990–1991), written by the novelist Mark Ellis and drawn by Darryl Banks, is a four-part comic book miniseries based on The Wild Wild West television series. It features the Knights of the Golden Circle in an assassination plot against President Ulysses S. Grant and Emperor Pedro II of Brazil during the Philadelphia Centennial Exposition of 1876.
- In the Southern Victory Series (1997–2007) by Harry Turtledove, the Confederacy's post-war territorial expansion into Latin America amounts only to the purchase of Cuba from Spain in 1878 and the purchase of Sonora and Chihuahua from the Second Mexican Empire in 1881, to construct a transcontinental railway and establish a Confederate naval presence in the Pacific. In the 1890s, the Confederacy attempted to build the Panama Canal but was dissuaded by an ultimatum from Union President Alfred Thayer Mahan.
- The KGC are the villains of the 2003 graphic novel Batman: Detective No. 27 by Michael Uslan and Peter Snejbjerg.
- The 2004 film C.S.A.: The Confederate States of America explores the results of a Southern victory in the Civil War and posits the Golden Circle as a plan enacted after the war.
- The KGC are portrayed as conspirators in the Lincoln assassination in the 2007 Disney movie National Treasure: Book of Secrets.
- The History Channel Show Brad Meltzer's Decoded features an episode, "Confederate Gold" (season 1, episode 5, first broadcast December 30, 2001), that focused on the KGC and their possible connection to hiding $20 million worth of missing coins from the Confederate treasury in or near Danville, Virginia. Four year later, in 2014, the Los Angeles Times noted that one theory, among many, on the origin of the Saddle Ridge Hoard of gold coins is that it was cached by the KGC, which "some believe buried millions in ill-gotten gold across a dozen states to finance a second Civil War".
- In the 2012 film Lincoln, the KGC is indirectly alluded to by President Lincoln to Thaddeus Stevens of the Radical Republicans. Lincoln specifically states that slavery would "spread out of the American South into South America” had Stevens' policies been pursued.
- In the William Martin novel The Lincoln Letter (2012), the KGC is a group of conspirators in Washington, DC during the Civil War.
- The KGC and their potential involvement in President Lincoln's assassination are discussed in the episode "Lincoln's Secret Assassins" of the History Channel series America Unearthed (season 2, episode 12, first broadcast February 15, 2014).
- The KGC are the antagonists in a story that is featured in the Atomic Robo webcomic in 2015.
- The KGC is referenced during a discussion concerning a potential assassination plot in the second season of the PBS television series Mercy Street in 2017.
- The KGC is the subject of a historical fiction novel by Steve Berry, The Lost Order, published on April 4, 2017.
- The KGC are the subject of the "Gold Diggers" episode of the TV show FBI: Most Wanted (season 4, episode 4, first broadcast October 11, 2022), when the team hunts a gang looking for the KGC's secret treasure.

== See also ==
- Adams-Onís Treaty
- All of Mexico Movement
- American imperialism
- American Mediterranean Sea
- Antebellum South
- Judah P. Benjamin
- Camp Douglas Conspiracy
- Confederados
- Confederate colonies
- Filibuster (military)
- Linconia
- Manifest Destiny
- Ostend Manifesto
- Republic of Sonora
- Republic of Yucatán
- Second Mexican Empire
- Slave Power
- Slavery in the United States
- Walker affair
