= San Antonio Express-News =

American newspaper, founded 1865

- The January 18, 2012, front page of the San Antonio Express-News
- Type: Daily newspaper
- Format: Broadsheet
- Owner: Hearst Communications
- Publisher: Mark Medici
- Editor: Marc Duvoisin
- Founded: 1865
- Language: English
- Headquarters: Avenue E and Third Street; San Antonio, Texas 78205; United States
- Circulation: 15,600 Average print circulation
- ISSN: 2690-7143
- OCLC number: 61312326
- Website: expressnews.com

The San Antonio Express-News is a daily newspaper in San Antonio, Texas, founded in 1865. It is owned by the Hearst Corporation and has offices in San Antonio and Austin, Texas. The Express-News is the third largest newspaper in the state of Texas, with a daily circulation of nearly 100,000 copies in 2016. The newspaper's online presence can be found at Expressnews.com. Hearst also owns MYSanAntonio.com, which shares office space with the Express-News but maintains a separate newsroom and website. MYSanAntonio.com, or MySA, is editorially independent of ExpressNews.com.

From 1881, the San Antonio Express-News' main competitor was the San Antonio Evening Light, which became a Hearst publication in 1924 and was shut down, in 1993, when Hearst bought the Express-News.

== History ==
The paper was first published in 1865 as a weekly tabloid-style newspaper under the name San Antonio Express. At that time, the city had already had a number of other newspapers in a number of different languages. However, all the other publications went out of business, leaving only the Express to serve the city.

In December 1866, the Express made the move from a weekly paper to a daily newspaper, and expanded into a full newspaper by the early 1870s. The early days of the Express was marked by several leadership changes which almost doomed the paper, until a brand new company, the Express Printing Company, took control in 1875. The Express eventually became a daily morning newspaper in 1878.

In January 1881, a new rival newspaper, the Evening Light, was first published by A. W. Gifford and J. P. Newcomb, who had been an early investor in the Express. The Evening Light was published as an afternoon paper, as opposed to the morning Express. At first, the editors of the Express chose to ignore the upstart paper, but the Light soon grew in popularity at the turn of the 20th century. In 1906 the Daily Light was sold to E. B. Chandler, and in 1909 the Daily Light Publishing Company bought the San Antonio Gazette. From then until 1911 the paper was referred to as the Light and Gazette. Edward S. O'Reilly, known as Tex, was at one time managing editor. In 1911 Harrison L. Beach and Charles S. Diehl, veteran correspondents of national standing, moved to San Antonio and bought the Light and Gazette. Once again it was known as the Light. Diehl was a founder of the AP wire service. Beach and Diehl installed leased wire news service and published the first full stock market reports in a San Antonio paper. The Light became liberal-Democratic in its political views. While Beach and Diehl ran the paper, circulation increased from 11,000 to 25,000 copies daily. In 1918, the Express ownership, now renamed Express Publishing Company, launched its own afternoon paper, the San Antonio Evening News. Soon thereafter, a rivalry developed between workers of the Express and the News. In fact, some News workers dubbed a new office building as the News-Express building. In 1924, however, William Randolph Hearst bought the Light and instituted Hearst policies, and by 1945 the circulation was approximately 70,000.

The 1920s was marked by expansion by Express Publishing as the company started one of the city's first radio stations, WOAI, in 1922. As the two rival publishers entered the 1950s, the Express and the News both had higher readership numbers than the Light. However, the Light skyrocketed to the top of the market when it acquired a number of popular comic strips, like Dick Tracy. The Express Publishing Company diversified further, acquiring two more radio stations and a television station, which they renamed KENS-TV. Those call letters were intended to stand for, K-Express News Station. In the 1960s, Express Publishing was sold to the Harte-Hanks newspaper group.

In 1973, with the Light beating both the Express and the News in circulation numbers, a new ownership group emerged. Australian native Rupert Murdoch of News Corp bought the Express and the News from Harte-Hanks. Murdoch re-formatted the News as a more tabloid-styled paper, while the Express retained its original, conservative format. The Light was now forced to compete against two different styles of newspaper while at the same time trying to combat the growing costs of an afternoon circulation.

By September 1984, the Express and the News merged into the San Antonio Express-News and afternoon service was slowly discontinued, while the Light started getting into the morning circulation business in order to keep up. But under News Corp., the Express-News adopted a more mainstream format and expanded its services to communities outside Bexar County. As a result, the Express-News became San Antonio's leading newspaper for good. By 1992, News Corp had diversified into movies and television and was looking to sell the Express-News. The Hearst Corporation, which still owned the Light, agreed to either sell or close the newspaper and acquire the Express-News in order to keep its stake in the San Antonio market. The Light never found a buyer and published its final edition on January 28, 1993.

In 2019, the Express-News sold its downtown headquarters building. The planned move to another downtown property was delayed as the COVID-19 pandemic led to the staff working remotely. In 2022, the paper relocated to the top two floors of the Light Building, which is named after its former tenant and Hearst property, The San Antonio Light. Following this move, employees began transitioning back to in-person work, and the news organization now operates under a hybrid model.

== See also ==
- Dan Cook
- List of newspapers in Texas

== Sources ==
- Donecker, Frances. "San Antonio Light". Handbook of Texas. Texas State Historical Association.
