= James Pearson Newcomb =

American politician (1837–1907)

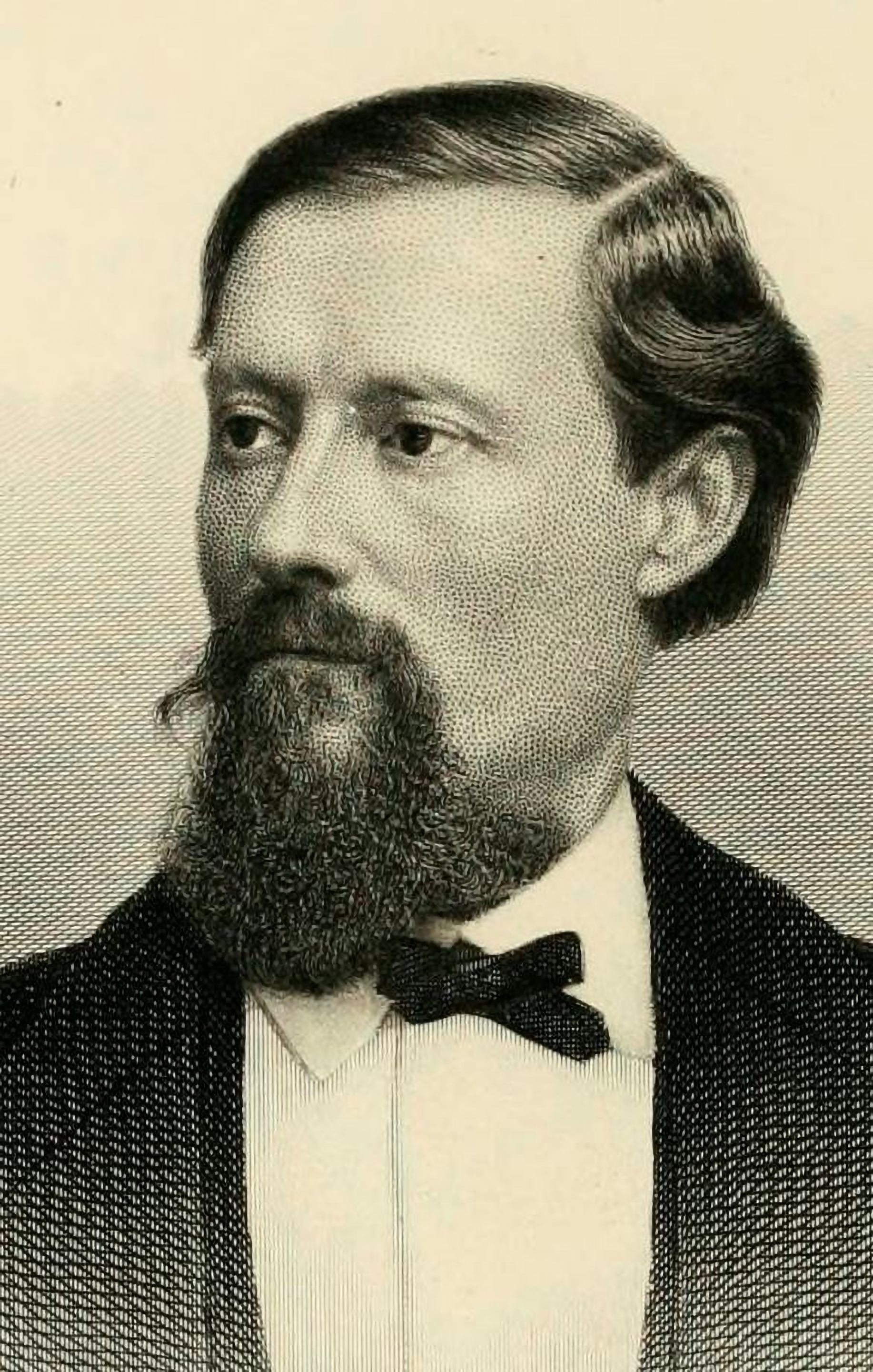

Secretary of State of Texas
- In office January 1, 1870 – January 17, 1874
- Governor: Edmund J. Davis
- Preceded by: D. W. C. Phillips
- Succeeded by: George W. Clark

Personal details
- Born: August 31, 1837; Amherst, Nova Scotia
- Died: October 16, 1907 (aged 70); San Antonio, Texas, U.S.
- Political party: Republican
- Spouse(s): Janie Davis (m. 1864) Antoinette Hitchcock (m. 1872)

James Pearson Newcomb (August 31, 1837 – October 16, 1907) was a journalist and Secretary of State of Texas. He was a Republican. Appointed by Governor Edmund J. Davis, he served between January 1, 1870 and January 17, 1874.

== Life ==
Newcomb was born in Amherst, Nova Scotia and with his parents and a brother, in 1839 he emigrated to Victoria, Texas. His mother died in 1841 and the family relocated to San Antonio. James Newcomb was 12 when his father, who was a lawyer, died of cholera in 1849. He was then apprenticed to a publisher.

As a young man he became a journalist and later publisher and editor of newspapers in Texas and California. One of his first publishing ventures was the Alamo Express. It was a pro-Union newspaper, and in 1861 it was mobbed by anti-union supporters, the Knights of the Golden Circle. Newcomb was forced to flee, traveling first to Mexico and then to California where he remained until 1867. In California, in 1862 he acted as a scout for James Henry Carleton's California Column, the longest trek through desert terrain ever attempted by the U.S. military. Following that campaign, in 1863 he returned to San Francisco where he published Sketch of Secession Times in Texas and Journal of Travel from Texas through Mexico to California in which he provided his theory of the secession movement that led to the American Civil War, blaming it on conspirators. After editing a handful of newspapers in California and starting one, the San Jose Times, which failed, he returned to Texas. There, he purchased an interest in the San Antonio Express, which proved to be highly successful. His positive articles attracted the interest of Governor Davis who appointed him Secretary of State in 1870. After leaving government, he studied law, though he practiced little.

In January 1881, with A. W. Gifford he began publishing the Evening Light, a competitor to the Express. The Light was a popular newspaper for several decades, though Newcomb left it in 1883. In the ensuing years, he ran for public office several times and launched other newspapers. He was appointed postmaster of San Antonio in 1883. He retired to a farm outside San Antonio where he died in 1907.

== Personal life ==
Newcomb was married twice. He married his first wife, Janie Davis, on August 31, 1864. In 1872 he married his second wife, 1872 Antoinette Hitchcock. Children survived him from his second marriage.

Party political offices
Preceded by None	Republican nominee for Texas's 10th congressional district 1886	Succeeded by Augustus Belknap
Political offices
Preceded by D. W. C. Phillips	Secretary of State of Texas; 1870–1874	Succeeded by George W. Clark
