= Crockett Hotel =

- U.S. Historic district – Contributing property
- Location within Texas Location within the United States
- Location: 320 Bonham San Antonio, Texas
- Coordinates: 29.42515°N 98.48515°W
- Built: 1909
- Part of: Alamo Plaza Historic District (ID77001425)
- Designated CP: July 13, 1977

The Crockett Hotel is a hotel in San Antonio, Texas, which overlooks The Alamo, and is a San Antonio historic landmark itself. It was built by the local Oddfellows' Lodge who occupied a portion of the hotel until they sold it in 1978.

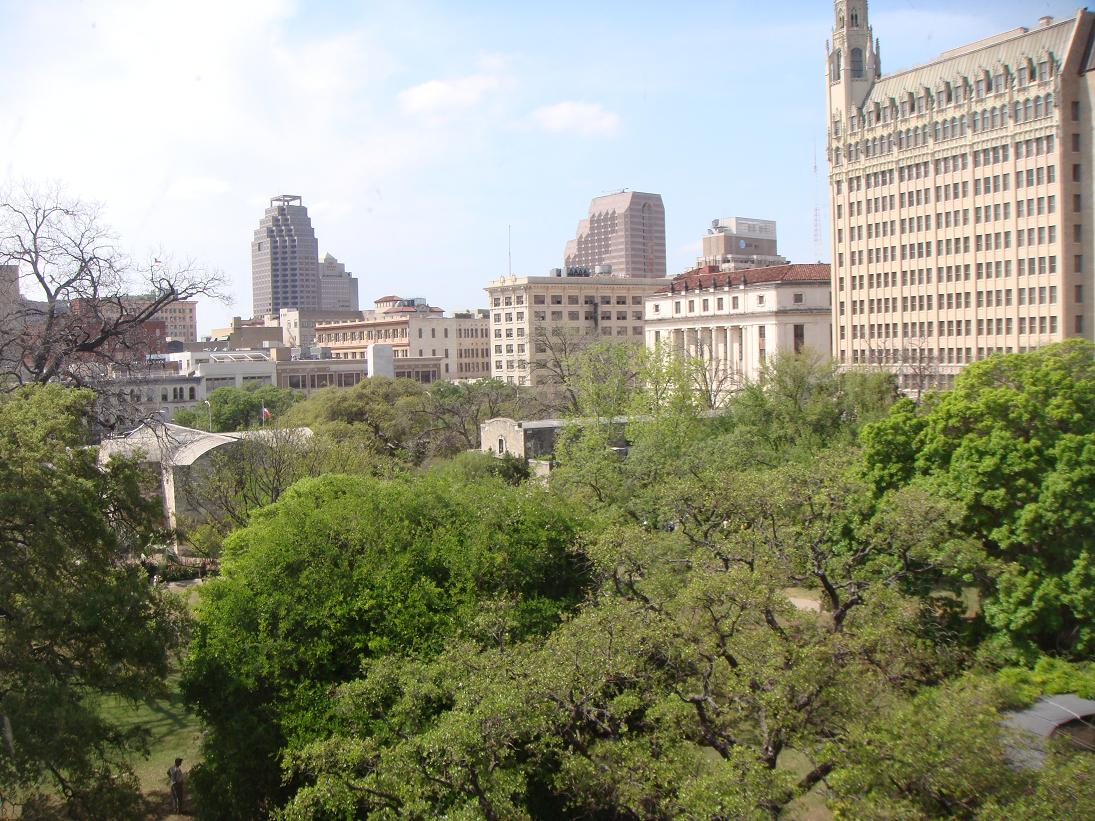
View over Alamo grounds from the hotel

Built in 1909, this was one of the three hotels built in downtown San Antonio.

It is located on the Battle of the Alamo grounds, on part of the original Alamo grounds, on the location of Honore Grenet's store.

Designed by Padgett, it was built with six stories in its main wing, topped by "a cornice with wide modillioned eaves", but a seventh story was added in a 1927 renovation designed by Henry P. Pheltz. There is a rounded corner entrance to the building at Bonham and Crockett streets, and the west facade of the building "is broken into two planes following the configuration of the block."

It was listed on the National Register of Historic Places in 1977 as a contributing building in the Alamo Plaza Historic District. At the time (1977) it was owned by the local Oddfellows' Lodge, which occupied the entire fifth floor, which also housed the Oddfellows' Grand Lodge Museum of Texas since 1961.

It has been a member of Historic Hotels of America since 2010.

== Davy Crockett Hotel in Crockett, Houston County ==
There was a Davy Crockett Hotel located in Crockett, seat of Houston County, Texas, which operated from 1927 until it was destroyed by a fire in 1972. It was owned by the Crockett Hotel Co. A Texas historic plaque, titled "Site of the Crockett Hotel", marks the site.
