= Alamo Plaza Historic District =

Historic district in Texas, United States

- U.S. National Register of Historic Places
- U.S. Historic district
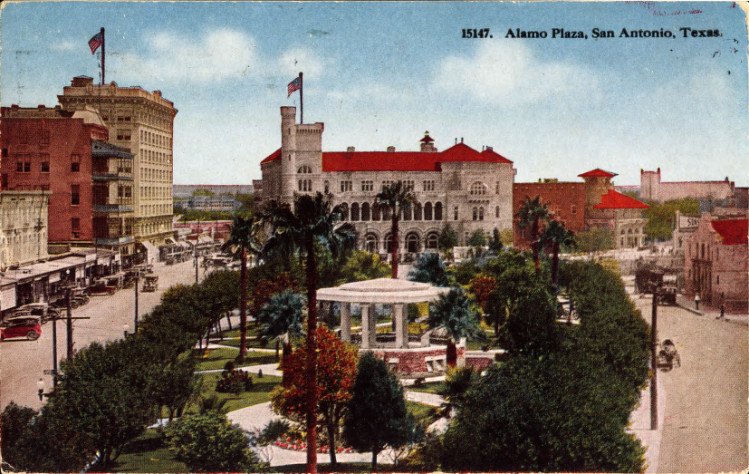
- 1917 Postcard depicting the Alamo Plaza

- Location within Texas Location within the United States
- Location: Roughly bounded by S. Broadway, Commerce, Bonham and Travis Sts. San Antonio, Texas; United States
- Coordinates: 29°25′31″N 98°29′8″W
- Built: 1836
- Architect: Multiple
- Architectural style: Late Victorian
- NRHP reference No.: 77001425
- Added to NRHP: July 13, 1977

The Alamo Plaza Historic District is a historic district of downtown San Antonio in the U.S. state of Texas. It was listed on the National Register of Historic Places in 1977. It includes the Alamo, which is a separately listed Registered Historic Place and a U.S. National Historic Landmark.

In the early eighteenth century, when, upon arrival of Spanish Catholics, local Native Americans asked the Franciscan missionaries for permanent shelter and protection from rival tribes, they were provided shelter within the missions in exchange for conversion to Christianity. They were also given Spanish names.

Alamo Plaza's layout and landscaping were designed and supervised by city alderman Anton Wulff during the late 19th century. In recognition of his work on behalf of the area, local business leaders presented him with a gold-topped walking stick, engraved with words of appreciation.

== Notable contributing properties ==
The district originally included 27 buildings or structures:

1. Menger Hotel, 204 Alamo Plaza. "Built in 1857 the Menger was originally a two-story limestone building designed by John Fries. Located at the southwest corner of the block the building later expanded to a three-story building at this corner. Alfred Giles is responsible for this later design. The west façade of the original building is now a three-story, three -bay structure. The slightly projecting central bay is crowned by a pedimented parapet. The first floor contains a central door flanked by two windows, while the second and third floors each contain three round arched openings. The end bays contain two flat arched windows on each floor and these pavilions are capped by a bracketed cornice. Iron balconies extend at the second and third floor levels. Additions to the north and east have been made several times in the 19th and 20th centuries and the hotel now fills the entire block. A lavish three-story space in the Menger lobby, illuminated by a stained glass, leaded skylight, dominates the old part of the hotel. The solid block of hotel buildings is broken in the center by an interior courtyard of walkways through dense tropical foliage."
2. Dullnig Building (1883), 101-103 North Alamo, a three-story Italianate-style brick building built for George Dullnig to serve as a grocery and dry goods store. A ten-foot false façade tops the building, where a cornice once was.
3. Scholz Palm Garden (before 1891), 105-109 North Alamo, two-story brick building
4. Crockett Hotel (1909), E. Crockett St., originally a six-story building, with a seventh story added in 1927. Overlooks The Alamo. property. Owned by corporation which also owns 1859 Menger Hotel, just across E. Crockett St., also overlooking The Alamo.
5. Vance Building (after 1930), 207-209 Alamo Plaza, a two-story brick building rebuilt after a fire in the 1920s or 1930s.
6. Old Joske's Building (1888 or later), 111-115 North Alamo, originally a two-story, six-bay brick commercial building, designed in 1888 by James Wahrenberger. Its main façade was plastered over in the 1900s.
7. Dreiss, Thompson and Company Building (1872), 117 North Alamo, a two-story, three-bay Victorian commercial building, built to serve as Adolph Dreiss's drugstore. While main façade on Alamo Plaza had been covered, and the first floor had been altered, the Broadway side of building was unaltered. The second floor (on which side? check Google Streetview) "contains three segmental arched windows separated by brick pilasters. A brick corbelled cornice is crowned by an arched parapet of pressed tin containing the company's name. The two adjacent buildings at 119-121 North Alamo are compatible in scale but their façades have been altered."
8. 211-215 North Alamo These three, two-story brick commercial buildings were probably built in the late 19th century. They have been plastered over on the main façade.
9. Reuter Building, 217-219 North Alamo The Reuter Building is a four-story rectangular building with an angled corner on the main facade, which contained the original entrance. The first (1891) two floors on both the Alamo and Crockett façades have been covered with a false front. The narrow façade facing Alamo street contains elaborate classical detail. The third floor windows are the most elaborate with a blind balustrade and a complete entablature above each. The windows on the fourth floor contain transoms. Divided into bays by pilasters, this east façade is crowned by a massive stone and metal cornice. Along the north (Crockett) façade the arches of the second floor windows are visible above the false front. The covered third and fourth floor windows have a flat lintel topped by a segmental arch.
10. Old Chamber of Commerce Building, Southeast corner Broadway and Crockett. This building is a two-story brick early 20th century commercial building with decorative cast concrete vertical members separating the windows on the second floor. Erected in 1919-21, this structure was occupied by the Chamber of Commerce until 1925.
11. H. L. Green's Department Store, 301-305 Alamo Plaza A two-story, nondescript limestone building. Green's was erected in the 1950s. This was formerly the site of the 1886 Grand Opera House, which was destroyed by fire after World War II. The lavish Opera House was a theatre which seated 1500 and an exclusive men's club, the San Antonio Club, kept rooms in the building.
12. 307 Alamo Plaza A three-story masonry building, this vacant structure was probably built in the 1950s, replacing the Old Mexican Consulate.
13. 309-315 Alamo Plaza A series of one-story buildings. Although the main façades are modern, the structures are possibly the same buildings which are visible in early photographs of the Plaza.

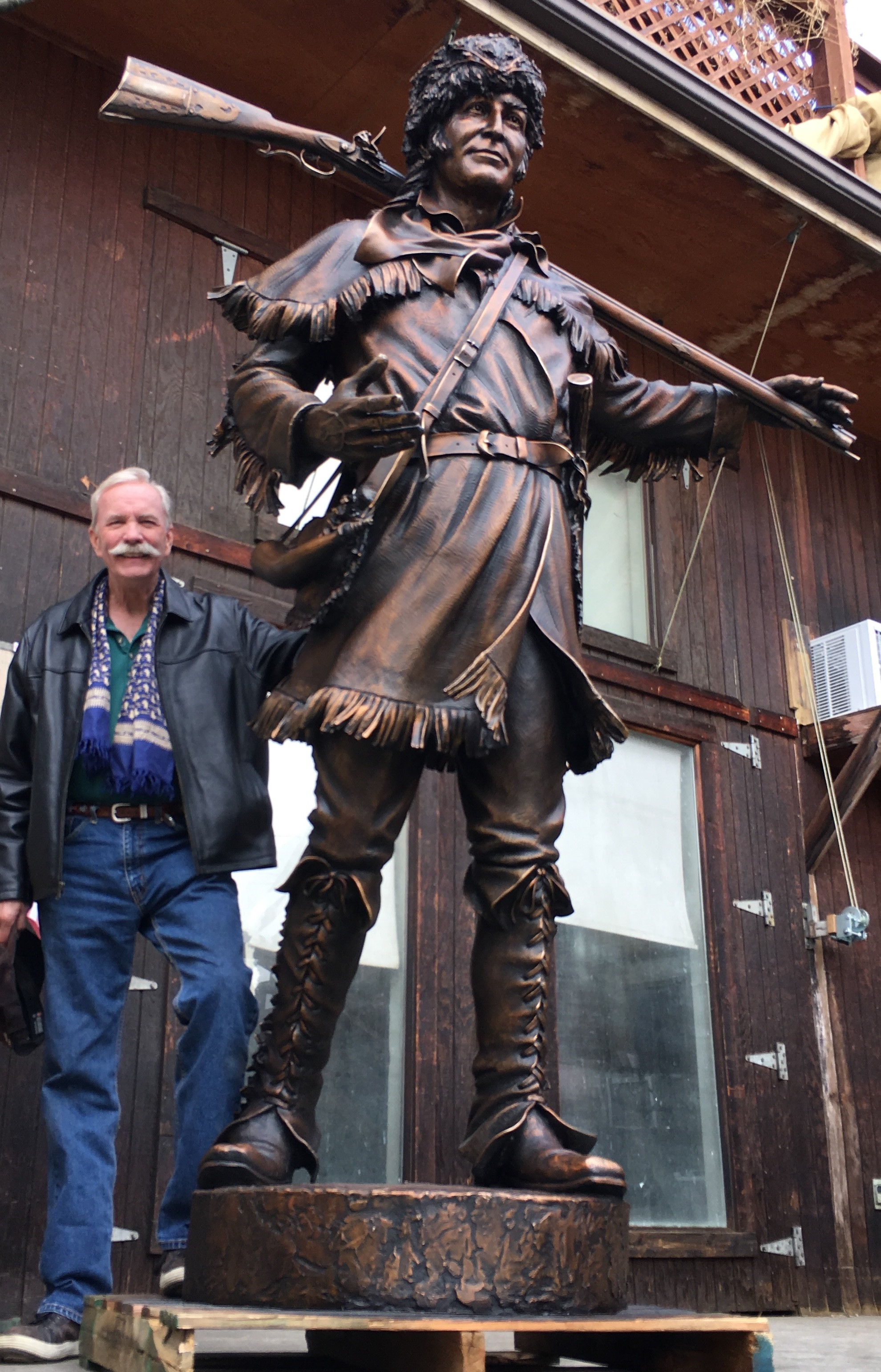
Statue of Davy Crockett installed at the Alamo Plaza, with sculptor George Lundeen on the left

1. Crockett Block, 317-323 Alamo Plaza Designed by Alfred Giles, this row of four limestone buildings were erected in 1882 for William and Albert Maverick. The three-story buildings are joined visually by a pressed tin cornice, but the façades of the two center buildings have been covered by a false front. Although they have been altered on the first floor, the two outside buildings retain their original arched openings on the second and third floors. Pilasters accentuate the corners of the original façades.
2. 327 Alamo Plaza A three-story masonry early 20th century commercial building which replaced the Old Palace Theatre is located on this lot.
3. Woolworth's Department Store, 518 East Houston Woolworth's was a three-story brick building erected in the 1920s to replace the old Maverick Bank Building. Divided into six wide bays on the Alamo Plaza façade the second and third floors utilized fenestration typical of the Commercial Style. Each unit contained a broad central light of plate glass, fixed, and narrow side lights with an opening sash. Each of these lights contained a transom. A frieze and slightly projecting cornice terminated the building. This early 20th century commercial building replaced an elaborate 1886 Victorian structure, designed by Alfred Giles. The bank was the first five-story building in the city and contained continuous balconies on all four levels.
4. Moore Building, Northeast corner of Houston and Broadway The Moore building is a six-story brick building stuccoed and scored to look like stone. Constructed in 1904, the building is basically rectangular with an angled southwest corner to mark the main entrance. Scoring accentuates the angled corner as well as the two flanking bays at the second, third and fourth levels. On both the south (Houston) and west (Crockett) façades fenestration is organized in vertical bands between three-story pilasters that are linked by arches at the top. A small cornice elaborated by terra-cotta swag and cartouche motifs marks the fifth floor, while a dentilled cornice emphasizes the 6th floor. Terra-cotta details further embellish the divisions between the paired windows on the 5th and 6th floors. Crowning the structure is a projecting pressed tin cornice. The building originally had a roof garden above the fifth floor with pavilions at four corners. An alley off Houston provided access to the elevator. In 1909, the addition of the sixth floor replaced the roof garden and expansion to the east closed the Houston Street entrance.
5. Gibbs Building, 521 East Houston An eight-story brick building, the Gibbs buildings, was constructed in 1912. The first two stories are scored and are divided from the shaft of the building by a bracketed cornice at the third floor level. The third through the seventh floors contain little ornamentation, but the top floor is articulated by a string-course and elaborate sculptural detail between the windows. Terminating the building is a bracketed cornice with modillions and dentils. The remainder of the buildings along Houston between Alamo Plaza and Broadway, as well as the buildings along Broadway behind the 300 block of Alamo Plaza, are not significant architecturally or historically, but they are compatible in scale and use.
6. Post Office and Federal Building (San Antonio, Texas), 615 East Houston. The Post Office is a four-story limestone Renaissance Revival building located in the prominent position at the north end of the Alamo Plaza. The building was designed by Ralph Cameron and built in 1937 by the Works Progress Administration. The ground floor is rusticated and contains the entrances, but the dominant feature of the main (south) façade is the classical colonnade in antis on the second and third floor. A cornice divides this level from the final story. The Postal Service first moved to Alamo Plaza in 1877 on the northwest corner of the present Joske's block. In 1886, J. Riely Gordon supervised construction of a Romanesque Revival building at this location. The present building replaced the 1886 Post Office.
7. Old Medical Arts Building (Landmark Building) (1926), 705 East Houston. A 13-story, steel framed, triangular building designed by Ralph Cameron, the old Medical Arts Building was constructed in 1926. The building contains two wings which form a triangular shape and, rising above the angled corner entrance at Houston and Avenue E, is a three-story, hexagonal tower. The first two floors are faced with stone and contain widearched window spaces. The upper portion of the building is brick with terra cotta detailing. The Medical Arts Building represents a commercial example of the Chateauesque style with its corner tower and steeply pitched mansard front at the top floor, surmounted by cresting and containing the wall dormers with high pinnacled gables. Elements of both the Gothic and Renaissance styles are evident in the detailing. Gothic features pre-dominate in the pointed arched openings of the first two floors and in the upper two floors of the tower. Below the dormers, however, the twelfth floor contains a series of round arched windows. The building has recently been purchased and renamed the Landmark Building.
8. San Antonio Turn Verein. The Turn Verein is a two-story brick building constructed in 1891 and designed by James Wahrenberger. The building is made of Chicago pressed brick relieved by stringcourses, lintels and balustrades of Kerrville limestone. A three-part composition of a recessed bay and projecting ends defines the east (main) façade. Within the wide central bay a slightly projecting main entrance is off center and is defined by a rusticated stone arch. The remainder of the first floor openings have stilted arches with a keystone and rusticated voussoirs. On the second floor above the main entrance are polished granite pilasters that frame a window with a pedimented entablature and square transom. An identical window is contained in the southeast projecting pavilion. The remaining windows have round arched windows supported by small granite columns, and are surmounted with a corbel table. The rectangular building displays a two-story bay window on the south façade. A metal, hipped roof shelters the building. The building was restored in 1972 by the U.S. Postal Service employees. The floor is of alternating oak and black walnut stripes. The staircase hall at the back of the building is illuminated through stained glass windows. Covering the staircase landing is a hardwood parquette floor laid in a bright pattern of contrasting colors. The ballroom on the second floor and the gymnasium in the basement have not been restored.
9. Cenotaph (1940), North end of the Plaza. [The cenotaph is a] memorial to the Alamo defenders stands in Alamo Plaza about 200 feet from the Alamo chapel. Dedicated in 1940 the design was conceived by Adams and Adams, architects and the sculptured figures were done by the internationally famed Pompeo Coppini. The sixty-foot monument has a white marble shaft atop a 40x12 foot granite base. On the east and west sides of the shaft are figures of the Alamo heroes, with James Bowie, James Bonham, William Barrett Travis, and Davy Crockett in full relief. On the north side is a female figure representing Texas. To the south is the Spirit of Sacrifice. The names of the Alamo heroes and two memorial sentences are inscribed on the base. The Cenotaph was commissioned by the state of Texas as a Texas Centennial project.
10. Bandstand, South end of the Plaza A recently constructed bandstand by the city which replaces the original bandstand built in the plaza by Wm. Reuter in 1890. The city is also currently covering the entire plaza with paving blocks.
11. The Alamo. This block contains the Alamo chapel building which has been restored and houses a museum. Several other buildings were erected in 1936 and a part of the old wall was reconstructed. The remainder of the block is covered by formally landscaped gardens and reveals part of the old acequia system.
12. Lady Bird Johnson Fountain This fountain honoring Lady Bird Johnson was dedicated in 1974.
13. Crockett Hotel, 201 East Crockett The Crockett Hotel was originally a six-story brick building, but a remodeling in 1927 added the seventh-story. A cornice with wide modillioned eaves surmounts the original six floors. Built in 1909 the hotel was designed by Padgett. The west façade is broken into two planes following the configuration of the block and the corner entrance at Bonham and Crockett is rounded.
14. Joske's Department Store, Commerce at Alamo Encompassing almost the entire south block of the plaza is Joske's Department Store, a four-story, U-shaped concrete structure with a stylized parapet. The present structure incorporates the 1888 brick building, designed by Alfred Giles, that stood at the southeast corner of the block. Joske's shared the north side of the block with the old 1877 Post Office, but in the 1950s Joske's expanded and remodeled, building on the entire block, except for the property of St. Joseph's Church.
15. St. Joseph's Church and Rectory, 623 East Commerce. Designed by G. Friesleben and Theodore Giraud, St. Joseph's Church was erected between 1868 and 1876. The limestone structure is a Gothic Revival, basilican plan church, dominated by a central entrance tower with a slate and copper roof. The third paster of the church. Father Henry Pefferkorm, painted the Stations of the Cross which hang at the sides of the church and the Assumption of Mary and Ascension of Christ that hang at the front. He also designed the first altar and choir loft, replaced the canvas windows with glass, and installed a pipe organ. In 1898, Jacob Wa

In 2019, Alamo Architects firm has designed, for the San Antonio Conservation Society, an Alamo Museum expansion area design utilizing the Woolworth building, the Crockett Block building, and the post office building, "that will interpret the history of the 1836 battle. This concept preserves the Woolworth Building as a visible link to San Antonio’s civil rights history."

== See also ==
- Medical Arts Building (San Antonio)
- Menger Hotel
- Main and Military Plazas Historic District, in San Antonio
- National Register of Historic Places listings in Bexar County, Texas
