= List of museums in Central Texas =

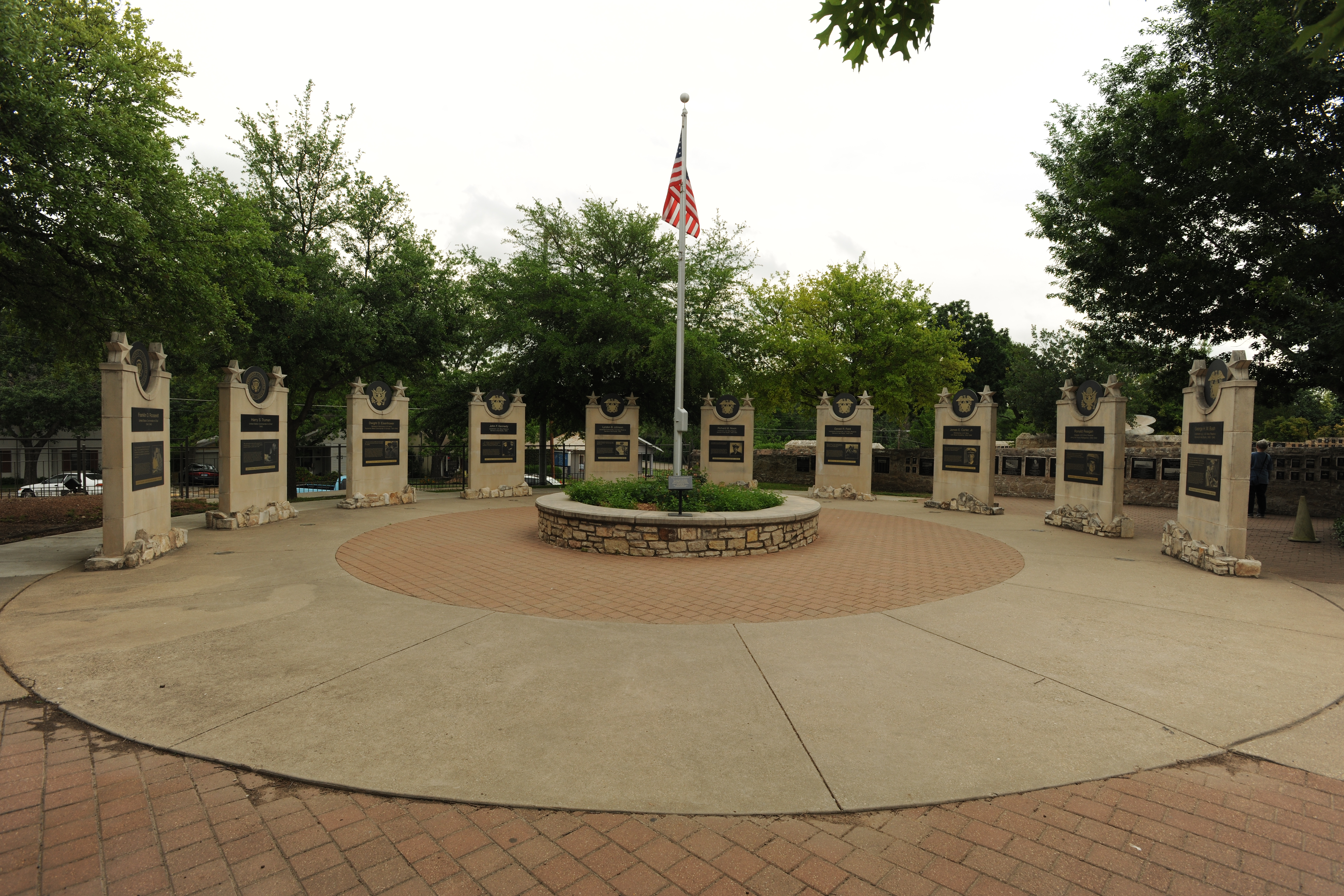
Plaza of the Presidents, National Museum of the Pacific War

The list of museums in Texas encompasses museums defined for this context as institutions (including nonprofit organizations, government entities, and private businesses) that collect and care for objects of cultural, artistic, scientific, or historical interest and make their collections or related exhibits available for public viewing. Also included are non-profit art galleries and exhibit spaces. Closed museums and museums that exist only in cyberspace (i.e., virtual museums) are not included.

== Central Texas ==
Central Texas is a region in the U.S. state of Texas. It is roughly bordered by Greater San Antonio to the Texas Hill Country to McLennan County to Washington County.

Counties included are Bandera, Bastrop, Bell, Bexar, Blanco, Bosque, Brazos, Burleson, Burnet, Caldwell, Comal, Comanche, Coryell, Falls, Fayette, Freestone, Gillespie, Grimes, Hamilton, Hays, Hill, Kendall, Kerr, Kimble, Lampasas, Lee, Leon, Limestone, Llano, Madison, Mason, McLennan, Milam, Mills, Robertson, San Saba, Travis, Washington, Williamson, and Wilson County, Texas.

== Museums in Central Texas, listed by county ==
=== Bandera - Bell ===
List of museums in Bandera - Bell counties, Texas
Museum name	Image	City	County	Notes	Refs
American Legion Post 157 Military Museum		Bandera	Bandera		
Frontier Times Museum	Frontier Times Museum	Bandera	Bandera	Recorded Texas Historic Landmark	
Lone Star Motorcycle Museum		Vanderpool	Bandera	Motorcycles dating from the 1910s to the present	
Bastrop County Historical Society Museum	Bastrop County Historical Society Museum	Bastrop	Bastrop	Recorded Texas Historic Landmark, National Register of Historic Places	
Elgin Depot Museum	Elgin Depot Museum	Elgin	Bastrop	Local history	
James H. Long Railroad Park and Museum	James H. Long Railroad Park and Museum	Smithville	Bastrop	Railroad	
McDade Historical Museum		McDade	Bastrop	Local history	
Rockne Museum	Rockne Museum	Rockne	Bastrop	History of 19th century German immigrants who founded Rockne	
Smithville Heritage House & Museum		Smithville	Bastrop	Operated by the Smithville Heritage Society	
1st Cavalry Division Museum	Howitzer at 1st Cavalry Division Museum	Fort Hood	Bell	History of the 1st Cavalry Division, a rapidly deployable heavy armored division of the United States Army	
3rd Cavalry Museum		Fort Hood	Bell	History of the regiment 1846–present day	
Bell County Museum	Chuckwagon exhibit at Bell County Museum	Belton	Bell	Recorded Texas Historic Landmark, National Register of Historic Places	
Czech Heritage Museum and Genealogical Center		Temple	Bell	Czech culture, history and immigration to America	
Musick Alumni Center and Museum at the Parker House		Belton	Bell	History of the University of Mary Hardin-Baylor	
Salado Museum and College Park	Salado Museum and College Park	Salado	Bell		
Temple Railroad and Heritage Museum	Temple Railroad and Heritage Museum	Temple	Bell	1911 Santa Fe Depot	

=== Bexar ===
List of museums in Bexar County, Texas
Museum name	Image	City	County	Notes	Refs
The Alamo	Alamo Mission in San Antonio	San Antonio	Bexar	Recorded Texas Historic Landmark, National Register of Historic Places	
Alamo Liaison Squadron Flying Museum		San Antonio	Bexar		
Artpace	Artpace	San Antonio	Bexar	Contemporary art center	
Blue Star Contemporary Art Museum	Blue Star Contemporary Art Museum	San Antonio	Bexar	Multiple exhibitions	
Briscoe Western Art Museum		San Antonio	Bexar	Art, history, and culture of the American West	
Buckhorn Saloon & Texas Ranger Museum	Buckhorn Saloon & Museum	San Antonio	Bexar	Old West saloon and museum with wildlife trophy mounts, mounted fish specimens, bird dioramas, the Hall of Texas History Wax Museum and the Texas Ranger Museum	
Casa Navarro State Historic Site	Casa Navarro State Historic Site	San Antonio	Bexar	Recorded Texas Historic Landmark, National Register of Historic Places, 1848 adobe home of Tejano patriot José Antonio Navarro, signer of Texas Declaration of Independence	
Centro de Artes	Centro de Artes	San Antonio	Bexar	City-owned exhibition space for Latino arts and cultures and their influences on the United States	
Culture Commons		San Antonio	Bexar	City-owned exhibit hall that features visual art exhibits, performances, invited speakers, and workshops, located in the Plaza de Armas building	
The DoSeum		San Antonio	Bexar	Childhood learning through creative arts, sciences and literacy	
Edward Steves Homestead	Edward Steves Homestead	San Antonio	Bexar	Late 19th-century Victorian homestead, operated by the San Antonio Conservation Society	
Fort Sam Houston Museum		San Antonio	Bexar	National Register of Historic Places	
Guadalupe Cultural Arts Center		San Antonio	Bexar	Traditional and contemporary Latino arts and culture	
The Guenther House	Guenther House in San Antonio	San Antonio	Bexar	Victorian period house that includes museum room with Pioneer Flour Mills memorabilia, restaurant and store	
Holocaust Memorial Museum of San Antonio		San Antonio	Bexar	aka Holocaust Memorial Museum of the Jewish Federation of San Antonio	
Instituto Cultural de México	Instituto Cultural de México	San Antonio	Bexar	Art and culture of Mexico, operated by the Mexican Cultural Institute	
Magic Lantern Castle Museum		San Antonio	Bexar	Collection of magic lanterns, slides and equipment, open by appointment only	
McNay Art Museum	McNay Art Museum	San Antonio	Bexar	AKA Marion Koogler McNay Art Museum	
Michael and Noemi Neidorff Art Gallery		San Antonio	Bexar	Trinity University	
Northside Independent School District School Museum		San Antonio	Bexar		
O. Henry House Museum	O. Henry House Museum	San Antonio	Bexar	House where author O. Henry worked while living in San Antonio	
Ruby City art center	Ruby City	San Antonio	Bexar	Opened in 2019	
San Antonio Art League Museum		San Antonio	Bexar	Media by Texas artists	
San Antonio Fire Museum		San Antonio	Bexar		
San Antonio Missions National Historical Park	San Antonio Missions National Historical Park	San Antonio	Bexar	Missions: Concepcion, San Jose, San Juan, and Espada	
San Antonio Museum of Art	San Antonio Museum of Art	San Antonio	Bexar	On the River Walk	
San Antonio Scottish Rite Library and Museum		San Antonio	Bexar		
Scobee Education Center at San Antonio College		San Antonio	Bexar		
Southwest School of Art		San Antonio	Bexar	Located in the Ursuline convent	
Semmes Gallery		San Antonio	Bexar	Part of Fine Arts Building at the University of the Incarnate Word	
Spanish Governor's Palace	Spanish Governor's Palace	San Antonio	Bexar	National Register of Historic Places	
Texas Air Museum at Stinson Field		San Antonio	Bexar	Texas and San Antonio's role in the development of military air power	
Texas Transportation Museum	Texas Transportation Museum	San Antonio	Bexar	Transportation	
United States Army Medical Department Museum	United States Army Medical Department Museum	San Antonio	Bexar	Located at Fort Sam Houston, Medical Department from 1775 to present	
University of Texas Institute of Texan Cultures	HemisFair Park	San Antonio	Bexar	HemisFair Park Campus of the University of Texas, San Antonio	
USAF Airman Heritage Museum	USAF Airman Heritage Museum	San Antonio	Bexar	JBSA Lackland Air Force Base, history of the U.S. Air Force, includes USAF Security Forces Museum	
UTSA art galleries		San Antonio	Bexar	Multiple galleries	
Villa Finale	Norton Polk Mathis house	San Antonio	Bexar	Victorian period mansion	
Witte Museum	Witte Museum	San Antonio	Bexar	Natural history, science, art	
Yturri-Edmunds Historic Site	Yturri-Edmunds Historic Site	San Antonio	Bexar	House and operating grist mill, 1840–1860, restored in 1964 by the San Antonio Conservation Society	

=== Blanco - Burnet ===
List of museums in Blanco - Burnet counties, Texas
Museum name	Image	City	County	Notes	Refs
Arthouse		Marble Falls	Blanco	Contemporary art from the collection of Mickey and Jeanne Klein	
Buggy Barn Museum		Blanco	Blanco	Vintage buggies, wagons and carriages	
Lyndon B. Johnson National Historical Park	Lyndon B. Johnson National Historical Park	Johnson City	Blanco	Boyhood home, Texas White House, Johnson family cemetery, Johnson's first school and his grandparents' log cabin	
Old Blanco County Courthouse		Blanco	Blanco	aka Blanco City Square, State Antiquities Landmark	
The Bosque County Collection		Meridian	Bosque	National Register of Historic Places	
Bosque Museum		Clifton	Bosque		
Benz Gallery of Floral Art		College Station	Brazos	Texas A&M University	
Brazos Valley African American Museum	Brazos Valley African American Museum	Bryan	Brazos	African and African American history, art and culture, both nationally and locally	
Brazos Valley Museum of Natural History	Brazos Valley Museum of Natural History	Bryan	Brazos	Natural	
Children's Museum of the Brazos Valley	Children's Museum of the Brazos Valley	Bryan	Brazos	Interactive	
MSC Forsyth Center Galleries		College Station	Brazos	Texas A&M University	
George H.W. Bush Presidential Library and Museum	George Bush Presidential Library	College Station	Brazos	Life and career of President George H. W. Bush	
Museum of the American GI		College Station	Brazos	Restored military vehicles	
Sam Houston Sanders Corps of Cadets Center		College Station	Brazos	Texas A&M University	
J. Wayne Stark Galleries		College Station	Brazos	Texas A&M University	
Wright Gallery		College Station	Brazos	Texas A&M University	
Burleson County Czech Heritage Museum	Burleson County Czech Heritage Museum	Caldwell	Burleson	Heritage and culture of the Czech in Europe and area Czech pioneer settlers	
Burleson County Historical Museum		Caldwell	Burleson	Operated by the Burleson County Historical Society in the Burleson County Courthouse	
Caldwell Visitors Center Museum		Caldwell	Burleson	Local history	
Somerville Area Museum		Somerville	Burleson	Local history	
Fort Croghan	Fort Croghan	Burnet	Burnet	Museum with period antiques and grounds with restored frontier fort buildings	
Falls on the Colorado Museum	Falls on the Colorado Museum	Marble Falls	Burnet	Local history	
Highland Lakes Squadron CAF Museum	Highland Lakes Squadron CAF Museum	Burnet	Burnet	Restored World War II aircraft, weapons, home front items, newspapers, uniforms, helmets, aircraft and ship models, other artifacts, part of the Commemorative Air Force; also known as Highland Lakes Air Museum	
Museo Benini		Marble Falls	Burnet	Established in 2015, on 35 acres in the Texas Hill Country with a 6,500 square foot museum, a fine arts library and outdoor sculptures. The galleries features 60 years of paintings and three-dimensional work of Italian-born Benini.	

=== Caldwell - Coryell ===
List of museums in Caldwell - Coryell counties, Texas
Museum name	Image	City	County	Notes	Refs
Caldwell County Museum	Caldwell County Museum	Lockhart	Caldwell	Located in the former Caldwell County Jail, operated by the Caldwell County Historical Commission	
Luling Oil Museum	Luling Oil Museum	Luling	Caldwell		
Southwest Museum of Clocks and Watches	Southwest Museum of Clocks and Watches	Lockhart	Caldwell	Historic clocks, watches	
Zedler Mill Museum and Park		Luling	Caldwell		
Buckhorn Barber Shop & Museum	Buckhorn Barber Shop & Museum	New Braunfels,	Comal	Miniature circus and pictures made from lapidary stone displays, operated by the New Braunfels Conservation Society	
Conservation Plaza	Conservation Plaza	New Braunfels	Comal	Also known as "Historic Old Town", 18 buildings from mid-19th century German-Texan communities are preserved here, operated by the New Braunfels Conservation Society	
Heritage Museum of the Texas Hill Country	Heritage Museum of the Texas Hill Country	Canyon Lake	Comal		
Lindheimer House	Lindheimer House	New Braunfels	Comal	Operated by the New Braunfels Conservation Society, tours upon request, mid 19th-century home of Ferdinand Lindheimer	
McKenna Children's Museum	McKenna Children's Museum	New Braunfels	Comal	Children's	
Museum of Texas Handmade Furniture		New Braunfels	Comal	Local museum situated on eleven acres, hosting one of the largest collections of Biedermeier-style furniture made by the Texas-German families of the 1800s.	
New Braunfels Conservation Society		New Braunfels	Comal		
New Braunfels Railroad Museum	New Braunfels Railroad Museum	New Braunfels	Comal	Local museum exhibiting the history of train transportation in New Braunfels and Comal County.	
Sophienburg Museum and Archives	Sophienburg Museum & Archives	New Braunfels	Comal	Recorded Texas Historic Landmark. Established in 1933, preserves and details the local history of New Braunfels, Comal County, and the Texas-German Immigration to Central Texas. Located on the site where Prince Carl of Solms-Braunfels first established his headquarters on the behalf of the Adelsverein Immigration Company.	
Comanche County Historical Museum		Comanche	Comanche	19th century setting, including the Comanche saloon	
Terrill Antique Car Museum		De Leon	Comanche		
Coryell Museum and Historical Center		Gatesville	Coryell	Museum also operates First Christian Church	

=== Falls - Freestone ===
List of museums in Falls - Freestone counties, Texas
Museum name	Image	City	County	Notes	Refs
Carmine Depot Museum and Visitors Center		Carmine	Fayette		
Central Texas Rail History Center		Flatonia	Fayette	Railroad memorabilia and information center	
E.A. Arnim Archives & Museum		Flatonia	Fayette	Exhibits of Flatonia history	
Fayette County Old Jail		La Grange	Fayette	AKA Texas Heroes Museum	
Fayetteville Area Heritage Museum		Fayetteville	Fayette	Cultural heritage interest	
La Grange Railroad Museum		La Grange	Fayette	La Grange M-K-T (Katy) Railroad Depot	
Monument Hill and Kreische Brewery State Historic Sites	Monument Hill and Kreische Brewery	La Grange	Fayette	National Register of Historic Places. Art Deco-style Monument to victims of the Dawson Massacre and the Mier Expedition, also Kreische House and tours of the brewery ruins	
N.W. Faison House	N.W. Faison House	La Grange	Fayette	Mid 19th-century house and museum once owned by Nathanel Faison	
Schulenburg Historical Museum	Schulenburg Historical Museum	Schulenburg	Fayette	German, Czech, and Austrian history	
Stanzel Model Aircraft Museum	Stanzel Model Aircraft Museum	Schulenburg	Fayette	History of Stanzel Company and the development of model aircraft, also late 19th century historic house	
Texas Basketball Museum	Texas Basketball Museum	Carmine	Fayette	History of Texas high school basketball	
Texas Czech Heritage and Cultural Center		La Grange	Fayette	Replica of a late 19th and early 20th century Czech Moravian community	
Texas Polka Music Museum	Texas Polka Music Museum	Schulenburg	Fayette	Texas polka music, bands and musicians of Czech, German and Polish ancestry	
Texas Quilt Museum	Texas Quilt Museum	La Grange	Fayette	Historic and contemporary quilts	
Winedale	Winedale	Winedale	Fayette	Complex of 19th-century structures and modern facilities situated on 225 acres, reflects German-American culture, operated by the Dolph Briscoe Center for American History	
B-RI Railroad Museum	B-RI Railroad Museum	Teague	Freestone	Trinity and Brazos Valley Railway Depot and Office Building	
Freestone County Historical Museum		Fairfield	Freestone	Located in a former jail, features telephone collection, two furnished log cabins	

=== Gillespie - Grimes ===
List of museums in Kendall - Kimble counties, Texas
Museum name	Image	City	County	Notes	Refs
Fort Martin Scott	Fort Martin Scott	Fredericksburg	Gillespie	Recorded Texas Historic Landmark, National Register of Historic Places	
Lyndon B. Johnson State Park and Historic Site	Lyndon B. Johnson State Park and Historic Site	Stonewall	Gillespie	Visitor center with memorabilia from President Johnson's presidency, the 1870s-period Behrens Cabin, and the 1918-period Sauer-Beckmann Farmstead, a living history farmstead	
National Museum of the Pacific War	National Museum of the Pacific War	Fredericksburg	Gillespie	Recorded Texas Historic Landmark, history of the Pacific Theater of Operations during World War II, part of Fleet Admiral Chester W. Nimitz State Historic Site	
Pioneer Museum	Pioneer Museum	Fredericksburg	Gillespie	The campus on Main Street preserves multiple historic buildings from the 19th and early 20th centuries of Fredericksburg's and Gillespie County's history, and tells the story of John O. Meusebach and the story of the Texas-German immigration to this area. The Pioneer Museum also manages the nearby Vereins Kirche and Historic County Jail.	
Texas Rangers Heritage Center		Fredericksburg	Gillespie	History of the Texas Rangers	
Vereins Kirche	Vereins Kirche	Fredericksburg	Gillespie	The first public building in Fredericksburg. Because of its unique octagon structure, it is known locally as "Kaffeemühle", the German term for "coffee mill"	
Bedias Museum and Library		Bedias	Grimes		
Blues Alley museum		Navasota	Grimes	Part of Navasota Blues Alley, shops and museum	
Fanthorp Inn State Historic Site	Fanthorp Inn State Historic Site	Anderson	Grimes	Restored 1850s period family home and stagecoach stop	
Horlock House Art Gallery and History Museum		Navasota	Grimes		

=== Hamilton - Hill ===
List of museums in Kendall - Kimble counties, Texas
Museum name	Image	City	County	Notes	Refs
Billy the Kid Museum	Billy the Kid Museum	Hico	Hamilton	American old west	
Hamilton County Historical Museum		Hamilton	Hamilton	Former Hamilton County Jail	
Central Texas Wing of the Commemorative Air Force	Central Texas Wing of the Commemorative Air Force	San Marcos	Hays		
Calaboose African American History Museum	Calaboose African American History Museum	San Marcos	Hays	USO Center for black soldiers in World War II.	
Centro Cultural Hispano de San Marcos		San Marcos	Hays	Hispanic arts, culture, heritage and values	
Charles S. Cock House Museum	Charles S. Cock House Museum	San Marcos	Hays	Operated by the Heritage Association of San Marcos, open for events	
Dr. Pound Historical Farmstead Museum	Pound Historical Farmstead Museum	Dripping Springs	Hays	Restored early 20th century farmstead	
LBJ Museum of San Marcos	LBJ Museum of San Marcos	San Marcos	Hays	College experiences and early political life of President Lyndon B. Johnson, on the town square	
Ofelia T. Vasquez Mexican American Culture Museum		San Marcos	Hays		
Walkers' Gallery		San Marcos	Hays	San Marcos Activity Center	
Wittliff Collections		San Marcos	Hays	Albert B. Alkek Library, exhibits from various collections	
Hill County Cell Block Museum		Hillsboro	Hill	Former county jail and sheriff's residence	
Hubbard Museum		Hubbard	Hill	Local memorabilia, at Hubbard High School	
Itasca Railroad Depot Museum		Itasca	Hill		
Texas Heritage Museum		Hillsboro	Hill	Located at Hill College	
Whitney Area Museum	Whitney Area Museum	Whitney	Hill	Local history	

=== Kendall - Kimble ===
- Treue der Union Monument is in Comfort, Texas in Kendall County, and needs to be added here.

List of museums in Kendall - Kimble counties, Texas
Museum name	Image	City	County	Notes	Refs
Agriculture Heritage Museum	Agriculture Heritage Museum	Boerne	Kendall	Agriculture	
Kerr Arts and Cultural Center		Kerrville	Kerr	Community art center with exhibits	
Museum of Western Art		Kerrville	Kerr	Art of the American West, formerly known as Cowboy Artists of America Museum	
O.C. Fisher Museum		Junction	Kimble	US Congressman O. C. Fisher represented Texas's 21st congressional district for 32 years	
Kimble County Historical Museum	Kimble County Historical Museum	Junction	Kimble		

=== Lampasas - LLano ===
List of museums in Lampasas - LLano counties, Texas
Museum name	Image	City	County	Notes	Refs
Lampasas County Museum		Lampasas	Lampasas		
Dime Box Heritage Society Museum	Dime Box Heritage Society Museum	Dime Box	Lee	Local history	
Giddings Public Library and Cultural Center		Giddings	Lee	Native American artifacts, Negro league baseball memorabilia of Hilton Smith	
Lee County Museum	Lee County Museum	Giddings	Lee	Located in the Schubert-Fletcher Home	
Lexington Log Cabins and Heritage Center		Lexington	Lee	Pioneer furnished log cabin and displays	
Texas Wendish Heritage Museum	Texas Wendish Heritage Museum	Serbin	Lee	Operated by the Texas Wendish Heritage Society, history and heritage of the Texas Wends, Slavic immigrants from Lusatia	
Confederate Reunion Grounds State Historic Site		Mexia	Limestone	Civil War-era cannon, reunion location of families and soldiers	
Limestone County Historical Museum		Groesbeck	Limestone		
Mexia Public Schools Museum		Mexia	Limestone	History of the Mexia Public Schools and Dunbar High School	
Old Fort Parker		Groesbeck	Limestone	Recorded Texas Historic Landmark, restored 1830s fort buildings, site of the Fort Parker massacre	
Llano County Historical Museum	Llano County Historical Museum	Llano	Llano	Recorded Texas Historic Landmark	
Llano Visitor Center and Railroad Museum		Llano	Llano		

=== Madison - Mills ===
List of museums in Madison - Mills counties, Texas
Museum name	Image	City	County	Notes	Refs
Madison County Museum	Madison County Museum	Madisonville	Madison County		
Fort Mason	Fort Mason	Mason	Mason	Established 1851, de-activated 1871. Robert E. Lee's last command with the United States Army. Managed by the Mason County Historical Society	
Mason County Museum		Mason	Mason	Operated by the Mason County Historical Society	
Armstrong Browning Library	Armstrong Browning Library	Waco	McLennan	Baylor University	
Art Center Waco		Waco	McLennan		
Dr Pepper Museum	Dr Pepper Museum	Waco	McLennan	National Register of Historic Places	
Earle-Napier-Kinnard House	Earle-Napier-Kinnard House	Waco	McLennan	Recorded Texas Historic Landmark	
East Terrace House Museum	East Terrace House Museum	Waco	McLennan	Operated by Historic Waco Foundation	
Fort House	Fort House, Waco	Waco	McLennan	Operated by Historic Waco Foundation, Edwardian Greek Revival home	
History of West Museum		Waco	McLennan		
Lee Lockwood Library and Museum		Waco	McLennan		
Martin Museum of Art		Waco	McLennan	Baylor University, the Hooper-Schaefer Fine Arts Center	
Masonic Grand Lodge Library & Museum of Texas		Waco	McLennan	Recorded Texas Historic Landmark	
Mayborn Museum Complex	Mayborn Museum Complex	Waco	McLennan	Baylor University	
McCulloch House	McCulloch House	Waco	McLennan	National Register Listing	
Red Men Museum and Library	Red Men Museum and Library	Waco	McLennan	History of the Fraternal Organization Improved Order of Red Men	
Texas Ranger Hall of Fame and Museum	Texas Ranger Hall of Fame and Museum	Waco	McLennan	History of the Texas Ranger Division	
Texas Sports Hall of Fame	Texas Sports Hall of Fame	Waco	McLennan	Distinguished athletes	
Waco Mammoth National Monument	Waco Mammoth National Monument	Waco	McLennan	Museum and park featuring fossils of twenty-four Columbian mammoths (Mammuthus columbi) and other mammals from the Pleistocene Epoch	
Fort McKavett State Historic Site	Fort McKavett State Historic Site	Fort McKavett	Menard	Recorded Texas Historic Landmark	
Presidio de San Saba	Presidio de San Saba	Menard	Menard		
Milam County Museum		Cameron	Milam	Recorded Texas Historic Landmark, National Register of Historic Places	
Mills County Historical Museum		Goldthwaite	Mills	Local history	

=== Robertson - San Saba ===
List of museums in Robertson - San Saba counties, Texas
Museum name	Image	City	County	Notes	Refs
Katy Hamman-Stricker Library		Calvert, Texas	Robertson	American Woman's League constructed this in 1909	
Camp Hearne Exhibit and Visitor Center		Hearne	Robertson	Camp Hearne was constructed as a World War II prisoner-of-war camp to hold enemy detainees from the Axis powers	
Hearne Railroad Museum Depot		Hearne	Robertson	Hearne depot opened in April 1868	
San Saba County Historical Museum		San Saba	San Saba		

=== Travis County ===
List of museums in Travis County, Texas
Museum name	Image	City	County	Notes	Refs
Anderson Mill and Robinson Museum		Volente	Travis		
Austin Fire Museum		Being relocated	Travis	Operated by the Austin Fire Museum Hook & Ladder Society	
Austin History Center	Austin History Center	Austin	Travis	Austin Public Library, features changing exhibits from its collections	
Austin Museum of Digital Art		Austin	Travis		
Austin Nature & Science Center	Austin Nature & Science Center	Austin	Travis	Zilker Park, hands-on nature exhibits	
Beverly S. Sheffield Education Center		Austin	Travis	"Splash! Into the Edwards Aquifer" exhibit about Barton Springs	
Blanton Museum of Art	Blanton Museum of Art	Austin	Travis	Part of the University of Texas at Austin, collection features European paintings, modern and contemporary American and Latin American art, prints and drawings	
Briscoe Center for American History	Briscoe Center for American History	Austin	Travis	Part of the University of Texas at Austin, exhibits of history from its collections	
Bullock Texas State History Museum	Bullock Texas State History Museum	Austin	Travis	Texas history	
Capitol Visitors Center		Austin	Travis	Exhibits about state history, tours of the Texas State Capitol	
Christian-Green Gallery		Austin	Travis		
The Contemporary Austin	The Contemporary Austin	Austin	Travis	Contemporary art, two locations, one in Clara Driscoll's Laguna Gloria, second in the Jones Center	
Dougherty Arts Center	Dougherty Arts Center	Austin	Travis	Events, exhibits, education	
Elisabet Ney Museum	Elisabet Ney Museum	Austin	Travis	Recorded Texas Historic Landmark, National Register of Historic Places	
Emma S. Barrientos Mexican American Cultural Center		Austin	Travis	Mexican American cultural arts and heritage	
Flower Hill Center		Austin	Travis	Smoot family homestead	
French Legation Museum	French Legation Museum	Austin	Travis	Recorded Texas Historic Landmark, National Register of Historic Places, built in 1841 for the French chargé d'affaires to the Republic of Texas	
George Washington Carver Museum and Cultural Center	George Washington Carver Museum and Cultural Center	Austin	Travis	Recorded Texas Historic Landmarks	
Harry Ransom Center	Harry Ransom Center	Austin	Travis	UT Austin, permanent exhibits include a Gutenberg Bible, the first photograph, Erle Stanley Gardner's Study, changing exhibits of art, photography and history from its collections	
H.J. Lutcher Stark Center for Physical Culture and Sports		Austin	Travis	On the campus off UT Austin	
Jacob Fontaine Religious Museum	Jacob Fontaine Religious Museum	Austin	Travis	Fontaine founded 13 African American Baptist churches in Travis County	
Susanna Dickinson Museum	Susanna Dickinson Museum	Austin	Travis	Susanna Dickinson and her daughter Angelina were civilian survivors of the Battle of the Alamo. Her husband Almaron died during the battle. She later remarried to Joseph Hanning	
Jourdan-Bachman Pioneer Farms		Austin	Travis	Recorded Texas Historic Landmark	
Lady Bird Johnson Wildflower Center	Lady Bird Johnson Wildflower Center	Austin	Travis	Botanical garden with changing art exhibits related to native flowers and nature	
Lyndon Baines Johnson Library and Museum	Lyndon Baines Johnson Library and Museum	Austin	Travis	Presidential library on the University of Texas campus	
Mexic-Arte Museum	Mexic-Arte Museum	Austin	Travis	Traditional and contemporary	
Museum of Magnetic Sound Recording		Austin	Travis	Technology	
Museum of Natural & Artificial Ephemerata		Austin	Travis	Rotating exhibits	
Museum of the Weird	Museum of the Weird	Austin	Travis	Strange and unusual items	
Neill-Cochran House Museum	Neill-Cochran House Museum	Austin	Travis	Recorded Texas Historic Landmark, National Register of Historic Places	
O. Henry Museum	O. Henry Museum	Austin	Travis	National Register of Historic Places, author O. Henry, also known as William Sidney Porter	
Oakwood Cemetery Chapel		Austin	Travis	Oldest city-owned cemetery in Austin, Texas	
Old Bakery and Emporium	Old Bakery and Emporium	Austin	Travis	Lundberg-Maerki Historical Collection museum	
People's Gallery at City Hall		Austin	Travis	Annual exhibit of works by regional artists	
Pump Project Art Complex		Austin	Travis	Non-profit art space to emerging and established artists	
Republic of Texas History Center	Republic of Texas History Center	Austin	Travis	Operated by the Daughters of the Republic of Texas	
South Austin Popular Culture Center	South Austin Popular Culture Center	Austin	Travis	Pop art related to Austin, focusing on the art and ephemera of Austin's live music scene from the 1960s through today.	
Texas Department of Public Safety Historical Museum and Research Center		Austin	Travis		
Texas Governor's Mansion	Texas Governor's Mansion	Austin	Travis	Home of every governor since 1856	
Texas Medical Association Robert G. Mickey History of Medicine Gallery		Austin	Travis		
Texas Memorial Museum	Texas Memorial Museum	Austin	Travis	Part of the University of Texas at Austin	
Texas Military Forces Museum	Texas Military Forces Museum	Austin	Travis	Camp Mabry	
Texas Music Museum	Texas Music Museum	Austin	Travis	Texas music legacy	
Texas Toy Museum		Austin	Travis		
The Thinkery	The Thinkery	Austin	Travis	Children's museum	
Umlauf Sculpture Garden and Museum	Umlauf Sculpture Garden and Museum	Austin	Travis	Sculpture by 20th century American sculptor Charles Umlauf and other contemporary sculptors	
Visual Arts Center		Austin	Travis		
Women & Their Work	Women & Their Work	Austin	Travis	Gallery for women artists	

=== Washington - Wilson ===
List of museums in Central Texas
Museum name	Image	City	County	Notes	Refs
Barrington Plantation		Washington	Washington	Recorded Texas Historic Landmark, Subject Marker	
Blue Bell Creameries Visitor's Center		Brenham	Washington		
Brenham Heritage Museum		Brenham	Washington		
Chappell Hill Historical Society Museum		Chappell Hill	Washington	National Register of Historic Places	
Giddings Wilkin House Museum 1843		Brenham	Washington		
Independence Hall		Washington	Washington		
Star of the Republic Museum		Washington	Washington		
Texas Baptist Historical Museum		Independence	Washington		
Texas Cotton Gin Museum		Burton	Washington	National Register of Historic Places	
Texas High School Baseball Coaches Association Museum		Brenham	Washington		
Washington-on-the-Brazos State Historic Site	Washington on the Brazos Monument	Washington-on-the-Brazos	Washington	Recorded Texas Historic Landmark	
Austin Steam Train Association Museum		Cedar Park	Williamson		
Moody Museum	Moody Museum	Taylor	Williamson	Texas Governor Dan Moody	
Round Rock Arts and Culture		Round Rock	Williamson	Area arts council with ArtSpace exhibit gallery	
Williamson Museum		Georgetown	Williamson	History of Williamson County	
La Vernia Heritage Museum		La Vernia	Wilson	Operated by the La Vernia Historical Association	
Sutherland Springs Museum		Sutherland Springs	Wilson		
Wilson County Jailhouse Museum		Floresville	Wilson	Operated by the Wilson County Historical Society, open the first Saturday of the month and for special events	
Dewees Remschel House		Dewees	Wilson	Operated by the Wilson County Historical Society, open by appointment, exhibits of local and ranching history	

== Defunct museums ==
- Central Texas Museum of Automotive History, Rosanky, closed in 2012, collections moved to Dick's Classic Garage in San Marcos, Texas
- Dog Museum, Waco, private collection of dog memorabilia located in Antiquibles Antique Mall, reported closed in 2014
- Fort Graham Museum
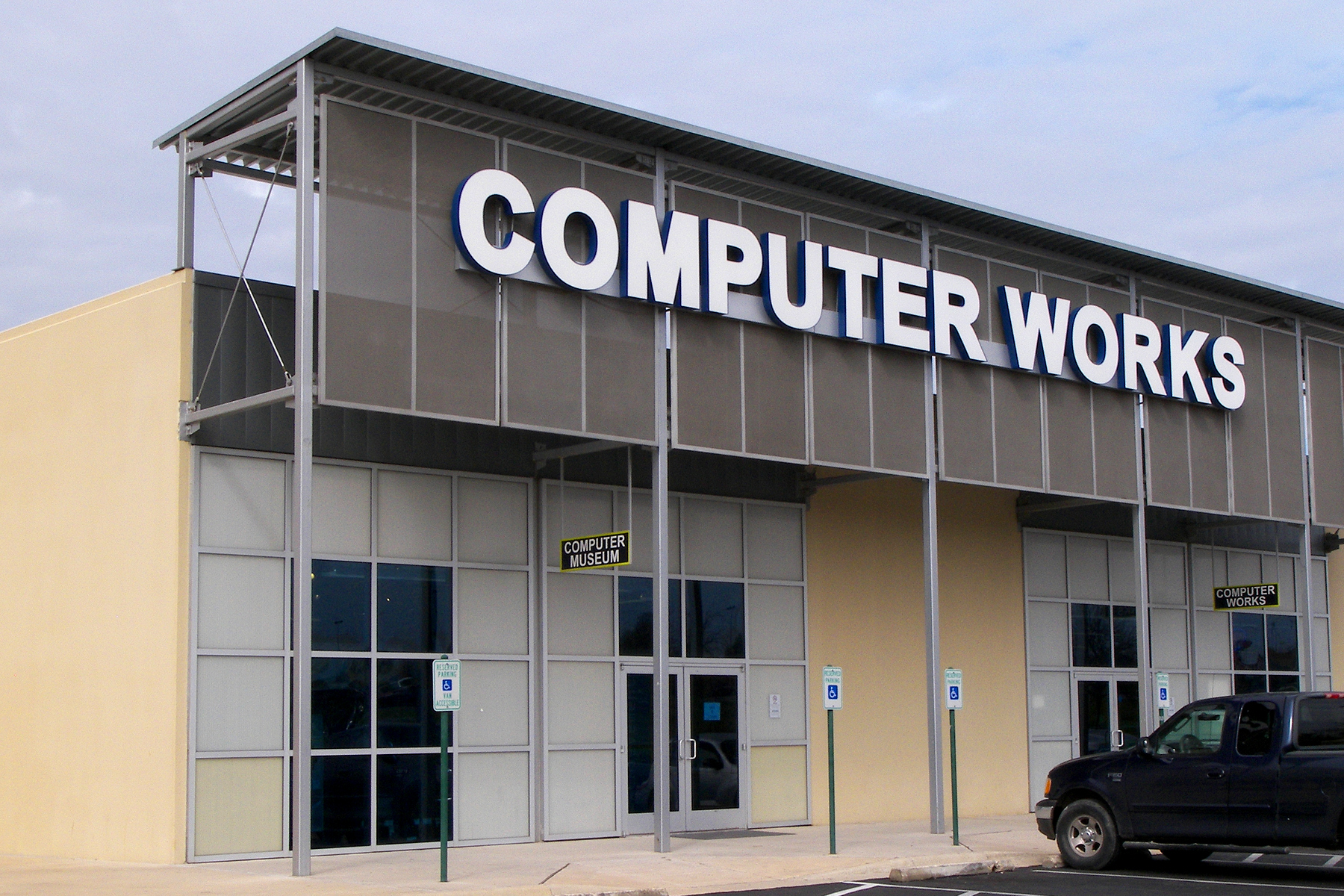
- Goodwill Computer Museum, , Austin, closed in 2015
- Hertzberg Circus Collection and Museum, San Antonio, closed in 2001, collections now at the Witte Museum
- Henkel Square Museum Village, Round Top, authentic restoration of Anglo-American and German-American 19th century homes, now the Henkel Square Market shopping village since 2010
- Hill Country Wildlife Museum, Llano
- Katherine Anne Porter House, Kyle, no longer a museum but now the Katherine Anne Porter Literary Center
- Museo Alameda, San Antonio, closed in 2012, space now the Educational & Cultural Arts Center for Texas A&M San Antonio
- Museum of Aerospace Medicine, San Antonio, closed in 2011
- USAF Security Forces Museum, San Antonio, history of the U.S. Air Force Security Forces, closed in 2014 and being consolidated with the USAF Airman Heritage Museum
- Texas Pioneers, Trail Drivers, Rangers Memorial Museum, San Antonio, moved to the Texas Ranger Museum at the Buckhorn Saloon & Museum
- Texas Museum of Science and Technology, closed in 2020
- Palm House Museum, Austin, closed 2021

== See also ==
- List of museums in Texas
- List of museums in East Texas
- List of museums in the Texas Gulf Coast
- List of museums in North Texas
- List of museums in the Texas Panhandle
- List of museums in South Texas
- List of museums in West Texas

== Resources ==
- Texas Association of Museums
- Historic House Museums in Texas
