= O. Henry House Museum (San Antonio) =

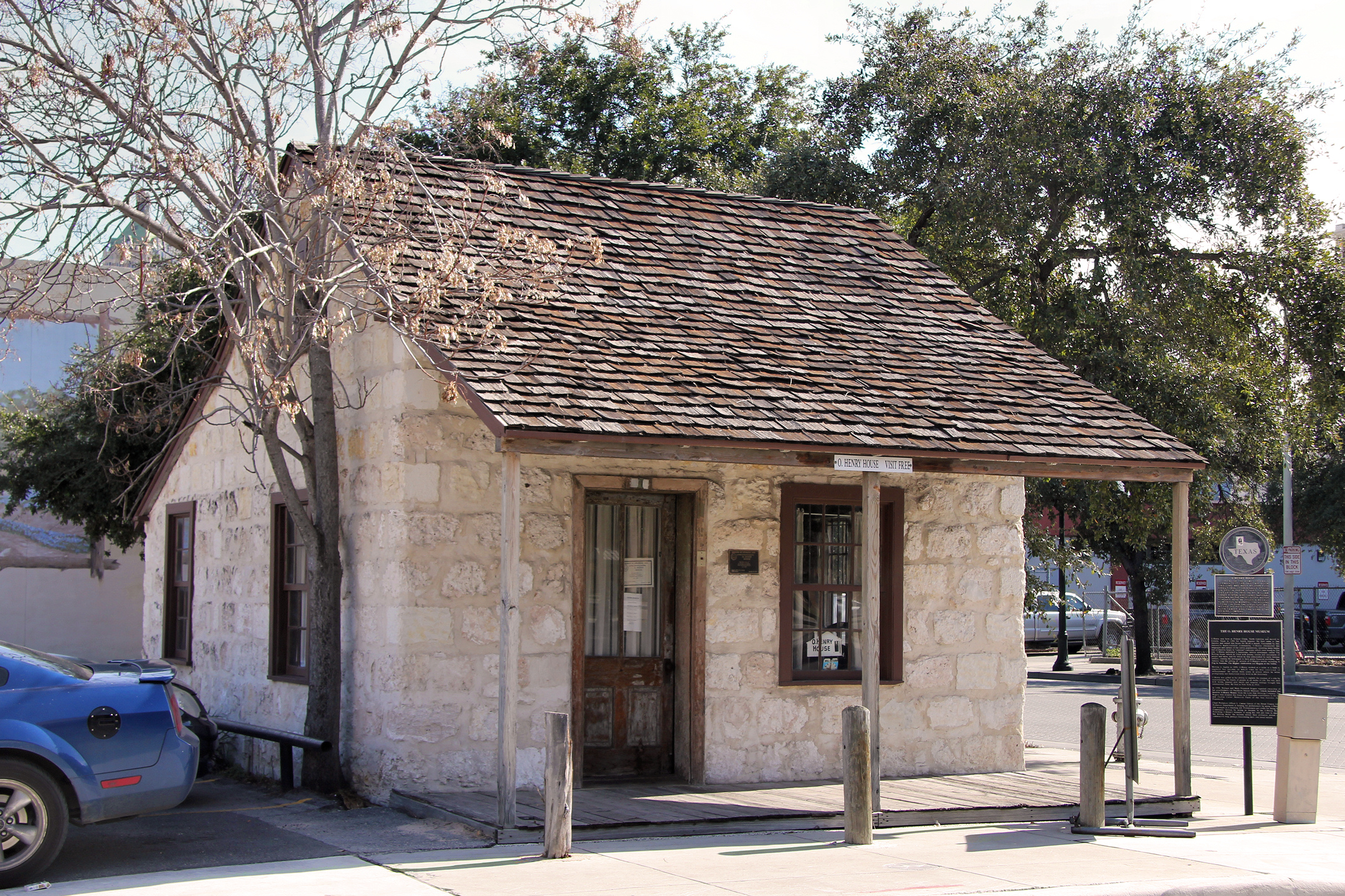
- The O. Henry House Museum in San Antonio

- O. Henry House (the United States)
- Interactive map showing the location of O. Henry House Museum
- Established: 1959 (reopened May 1999)
- Location: 601 Dolorosa St., San Antonio, Texas
- Coordinates: 29°25′28″N 98°29′50″W
- Type: Historic house museum
- Website: O. Henry House Museum
- O. Henry House
- U.S. Historic district – Contributing property
- Recorded Texas Historic Landmark
- Built: 1855
- Built by: John Kush
- Part of: Main and Military Plazas Historic District (ID79002914)
- RTHL No.: 2453

Significant dates
- Designated CP: June 11, 1979
- Designated RTHL: 1964

The O. Henry House Museum is a historic house museum located in San Antonio, Texas. It is named for the American writer, William Sydney Porter, better known by his pen name O. Henry, who lived in the house in 1885.

== History ==
The structure that became the O. Henry House museum was initially built by John Kush, a German settler in 1855. The house, built in adobe brick, was originally located at 904 South Presa Street.

William Sydney Porter, better known as O. Henry, lived in San Antonio from 1883 to 1885 after being accused of embezzlement at his job at a bank in Austin. In San Antonio, he founded a humorous magazine he named Rolling Stone. Porter rented this two-room house for $6 a month.

In 1959, the San Antonio Conservation Society, working with both the Lone Star Brewing Company and the descendants of John Kush, the original owner, purchased the home for a symbolic one dollar. This included the responsibility of moving the home within 60 days to save it from demolition. It was moved to the location of the Lone Star Brewing Company where it was part of the Buckhorn Museum collection until the breweries closure in 1997. In 1998, David Carter and the MLP partnership moved the house once more, this time to its present location at the corner of Dolorosa and Laredo Street in Downtown San Antonio.

After restoration, the home as a museum in 1999. It contains period furniture and items related to Porter's life and writings.

== Works written here ==
While living here, Porter wrote several short stories set in San Antonio. These included "Fog in Santone", "The Higher Abdication", and "Hygeia at the Solito".

== See also ==
- William Sidney Porter House
- List of museums in Central Texas
- National Register of Historic Places listings in Bexar County, Texas
- Recorded Texas Historic Landmarks in Bexar County
