= Empire (1910 automobile) =

Defunct American motor vehicle manufacturer

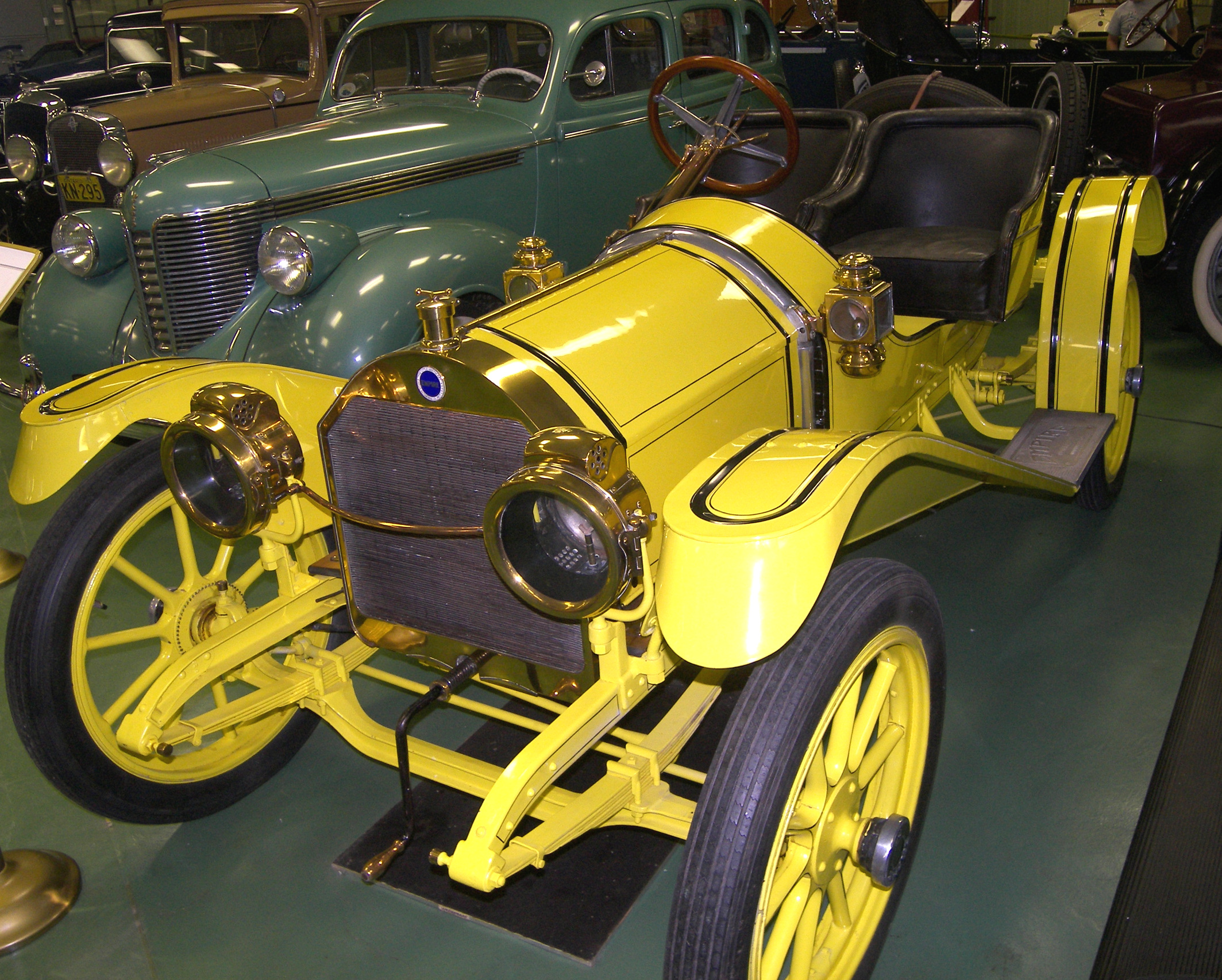
- A 1910 Empire 20 "B" model on display at the Central Texas Museum of Automotive History in Texas.

Overview
- Manufacturer: Empire Motor Car Company, Greenville Metal Products Co.
- Model code: A, B
- Production: 1910–1919
- Assembly: Indianapolis, Indiana, United States; Greenville, Pennsylvania, United States

Body and chassis
- Body style: 3-passenger runabout; 5-passenger touring car; 4-door roadster

Powertrain
- Engine: 3865 cc 4-cylinder; 3670 cc 6-cylinder

Empire Model 31 (1913).jpg

The Empire was an American automobile manufactured from 1910 until 1919. Marketed as "the little aristocrat", the Empire 20 was a four-cylinder shaft-driven runabout built in Indianapolis. The model "A" was a conventional runabout for three passengers with a rumble seat. The Model A had a four-cylinder engine with 2523 cc, a bore of 88.9 mm, and a stroke of 101.6 mm. The engine power was 20 hp. The Engine was water cooled by natural circulation without pump. It had a two speed Gearbox. The gasoline capacity was 11 gallon = 47 liter. The wheelbase was 96 inches = 2438 mm. The vehicle weight was 1350 pounds = 612 kilograms. The model "B" had two bucket seats, a longer hood and was geared higher to attain faster speeds.

More conventional bodywork was later offered; in April 1915 the marque announced production of a 35 hp for 1916. The company's final products were a four of 3865 cc and a six of 3670 cc.

The business, Empire Motor Car Company, founded in 1909 was a project of Arthur Newby, Carl Fisher, James Allison and shock absorber manufacturer Robert Hassler who built the Indianapolis Motor Speedway in 1909. Their first car was designed by Harry C. Stutz.

From 1912 to 1919, the Greenville Metal Products Co. of Greenville, PA, also produced the Empire. After 1912, 4 different models were produced, a five-passenger touring car and four-passenger four-door roadster with 6-cylinder engines. In addition were 4-cylinder five-passenger touring cars and two-passenger roadsters. A Greenville-made Empire is in the Waugh House, the Greenville Area Historical Society Museum.

== Gallery ==
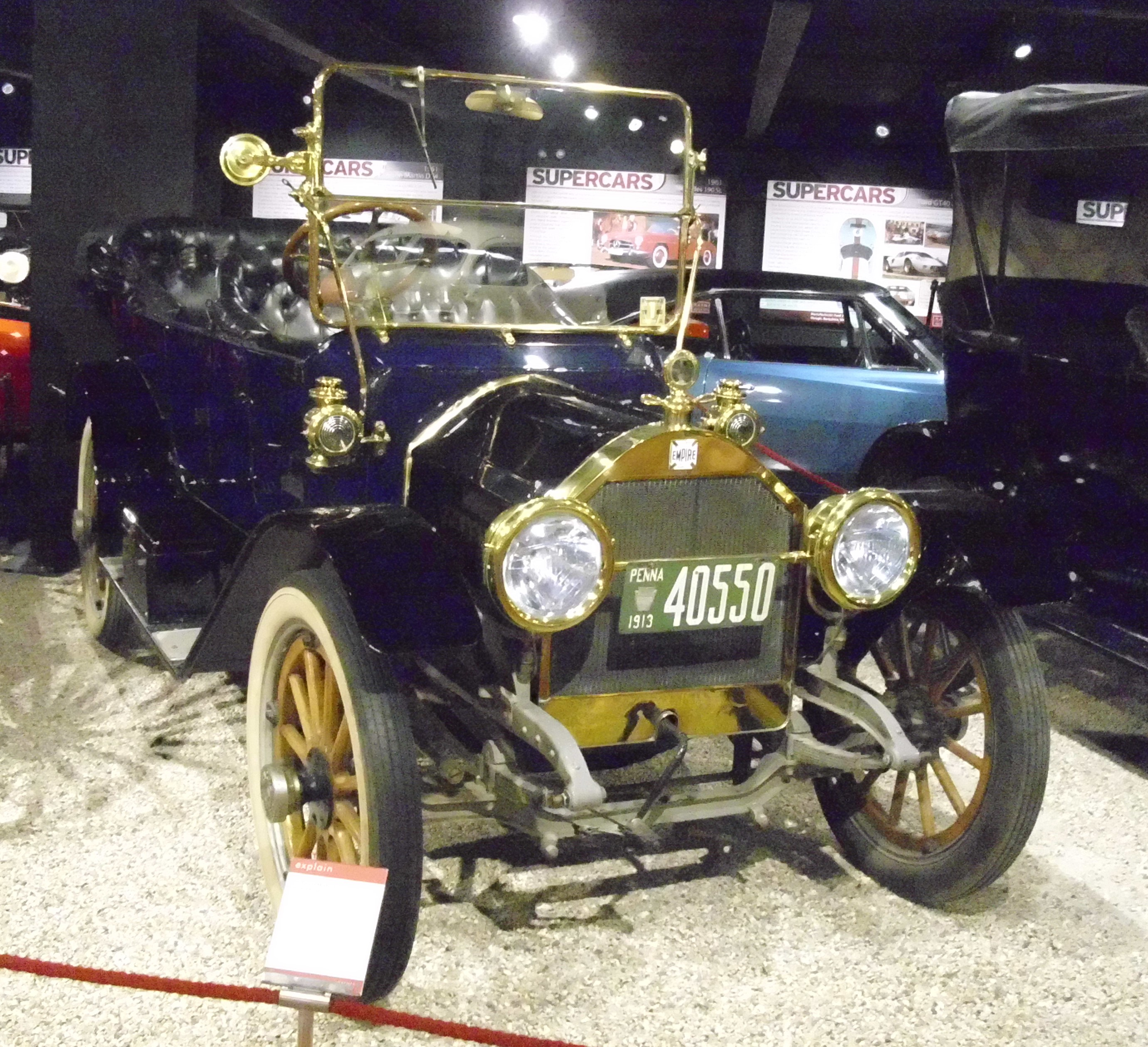
A 1913 Empire model 31 "Little Aristocrat", a five-seat tourer at the Haynes International Motor Museum in the UK

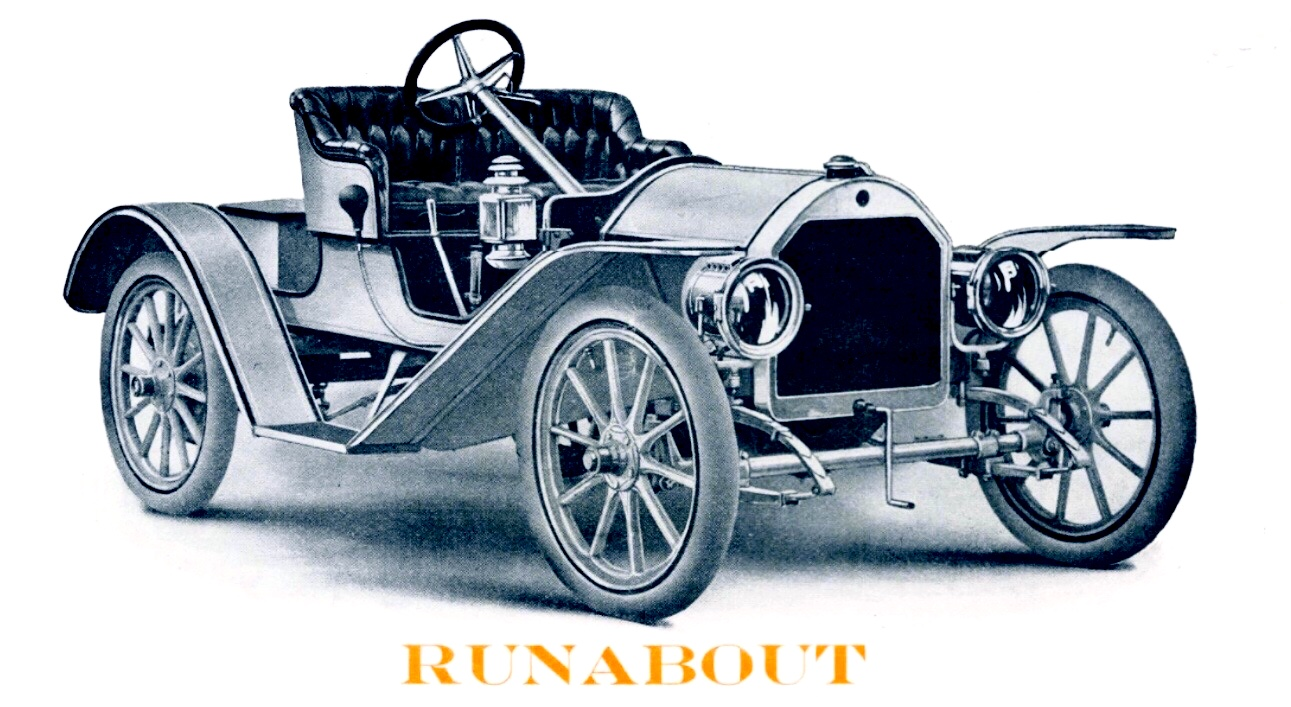
Empire 20 Runabout Model A (1909–1912)

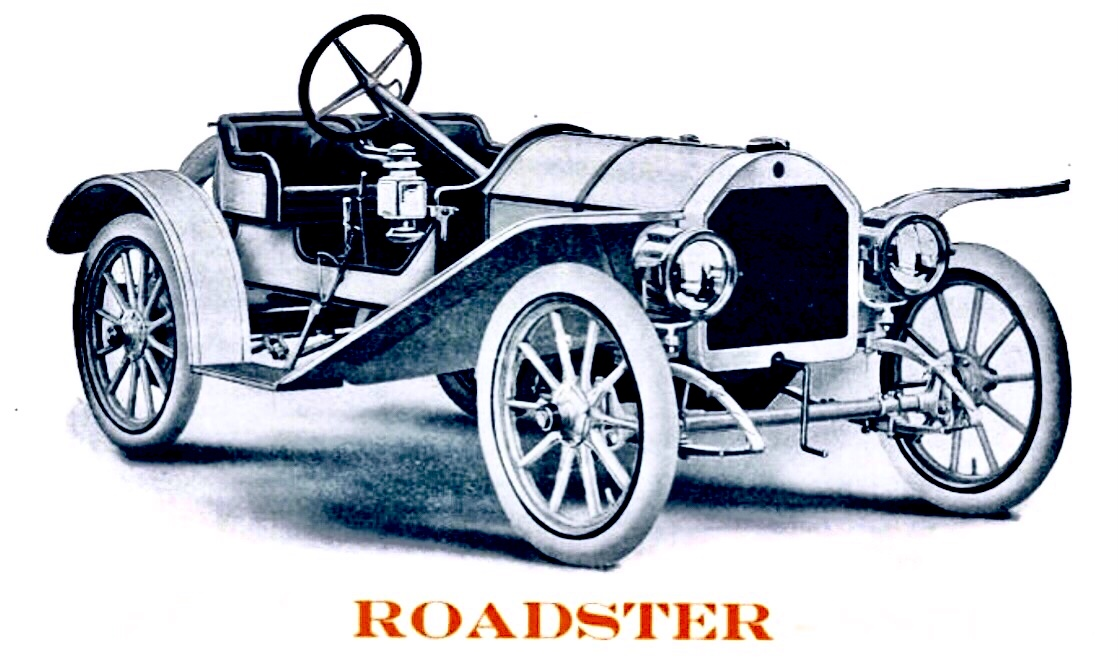
Empire 20 Runabout Model B (1909–1912)
