= Buckhorn Saloon & Museum (San Antonio) =

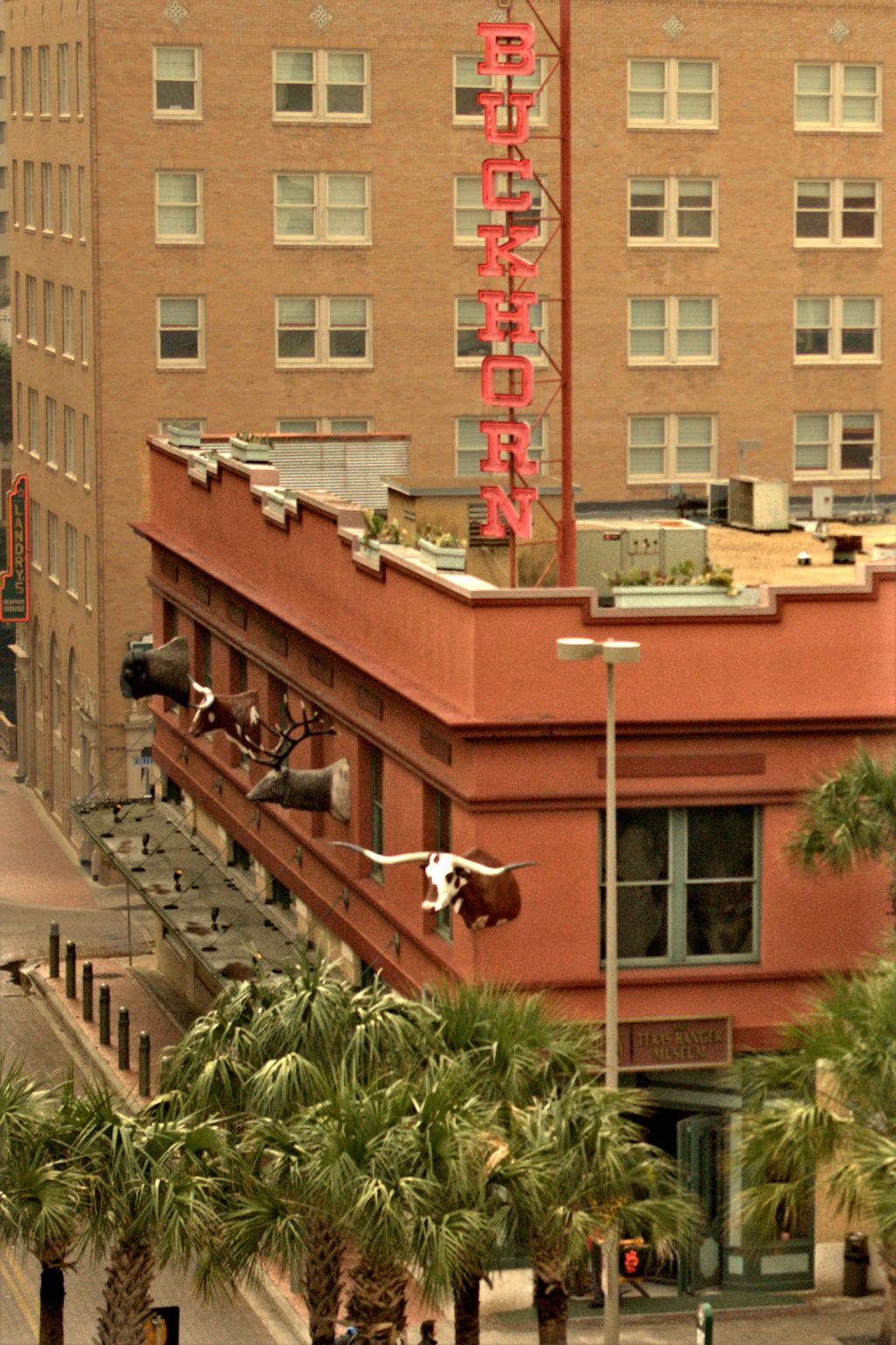

- Location within Texas
- Established: 1881
- Location: 318 E. Houston Street, San Antonio, Texas, US
- Coordinates: 29.426232°N 98.489692°W
- Type: Wildlife exhibits Shooting gallery Texas Rangers exhibit
- Founder: Albert Friedrich
- Website: Buckhorn Museum

The Buckhorn Saloon & Museum is a privately run museum located at 318 E. Houston Street in Downtown San Antonio, Texas, U.S. Originally privately owned by Albert Friedrich, the Buckhorn became a tourist attraction for its unique collections. Theodore Roosevelt and his Rough Riders were reputed to frequent the establishment. Housed in 1956 in the Old Lone Star Brewery, the collection passed to Friedrich's heirs who had it moved to its current location.

== Albert Friedrich ==
The Buckhorn Saloon & Museum began as a private collection of Albert Friedrich (1864–1928) in 1881. He was the youngest son of Wenzel and Agnes Urbaneck Friedrich. The elder Friedrich was an award-winning cabinetmaker who expanded into horn furniture and included Queen Victoria, Otto von Bismarck and Kaiser Wilhelm I among those who owned his creations.

== First business establishment ==
Friedrich eventually acquired a saloon on Dolorosa Street and opened his collection for display in the saloon. The name and date of the first saloon is undocumented. In 1890–95, Friedrich purchased a seventy-eight point buck that remains on display in the museum. By 1896, Friedrich opened the first Buckhorn Saloon on the corner of Soledad and West Houston streets. Friedrich amassed his collection from his own hunting trips, and from other hunters and trappers, eventually acquiring the collection of a hunter named Capt. Ernest Dosch. In its early years, Friedrich would swap a drink for anyone who would bring in a set of horns to be displayed. The collection became known as the Buckhorn Hall of Horns. A collection of firearms and a mirrored bar were added to the collection of horns. The saloon was reputed to be frequented by Theodore Roosevelt and his Rough Riders during the time period that the Rough Riders were deployed to San Antonio.

== Lone Star Brewery ==
When Prohibition went into effect, Friedrich could no longer sell alcohol. In 1922, he relocated his business to 400 W. Houston Street, renaming it Albert's Curio Store and eventually the Buckhorn Curio Store and Cafe. In 1956, the Buckhorn Saloon and the Buckhorn Hall of Horns collection were restored at the Lone Star Brewery. The collection added a 1964 Hall of Fins, as well as a 1973 Hall of Feathers.

== SA Live- KSAT-TV ==
The Buckhorn Museum hosts the SA Live television show.

== Museums and Displays ==
When Lone Star Brewing Company changed owners in 1977, the Buckhorn collection was sold off. Mary Friedrich Rogers, granddaughter of Albert Friedrich, and her husband Wallace Rogers, acquired the collection in 1997. The collection was moved to 318 E. Houston Street and became managed by Twisthorn Holdings and the Buckhorn Museum and Saloon Limited.

=== Buckhorn Museum ===
The Buckhorn Museum features mounted wildlife from all over the world, including mammals, birds and fish. The animals represent over 520 species of wildlife, including fish from the seven seas and animals from every continent.

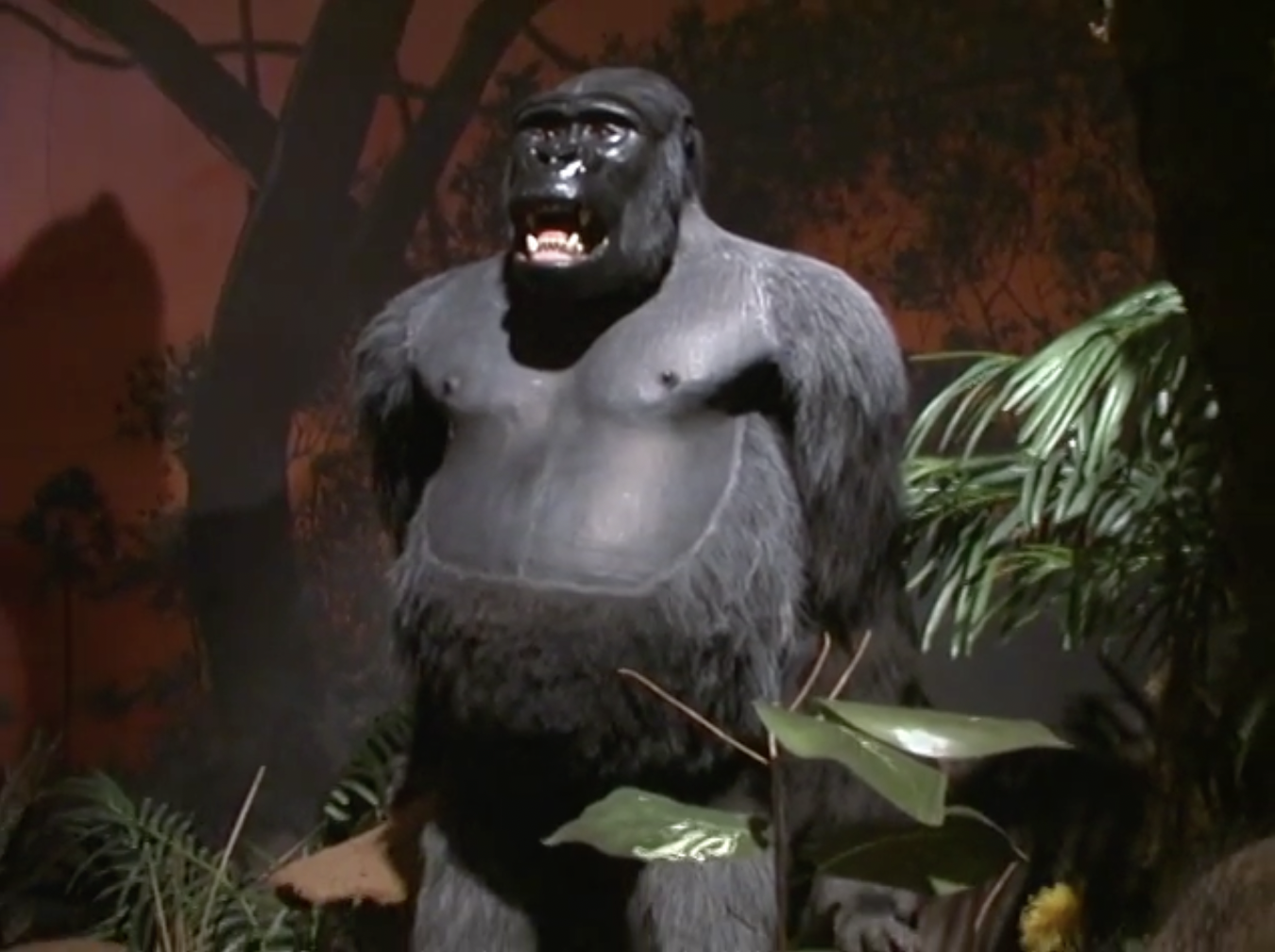
Gorilla on display at the Buckhorn Museum

Highlights of the museum include a 78 Point Brady Buck, a world record holding 1,056-pound black marlin, a longhorn with an 8-foot spread, and the first gorilla ever on public display in the United States. Comedian and San Antonio native Carol Burnett claimed to have been frightened by the gorilla as a child.

=== Texas Ranger Museum ===
The Texas Ranger Museum features authentic Texas Ranger Division artifacts including automatic handguns, shotguns, badges, photographs and more. The museum also features Ranger Town, a recreation of San Antonio at the turn of the century which includes a replica Buckhorn Saloon, jail cell, blacksmith shop and a replica of the 1934 Ford V8 Deluxe — the famous Bonnie & Clyde getaway car. The Texas Ranger Museum is not affiliated with the official Texas Ranger Hall of Fame and Museum in Waco.

=== Other displays ===
In addition to the horn collection, a visitor will also find rattlesnake art, and memorabilia of both Native Americans and the cowboy culture. Some of the exhibits include the "Carnival of Curiosities" and the "American Sideshow".

=== Hall of Texas History Wax Museum ===
The Hall of Texas History Wax Museum portion of the Buckhorn depicts historic events in Texas.

== Gallery ==
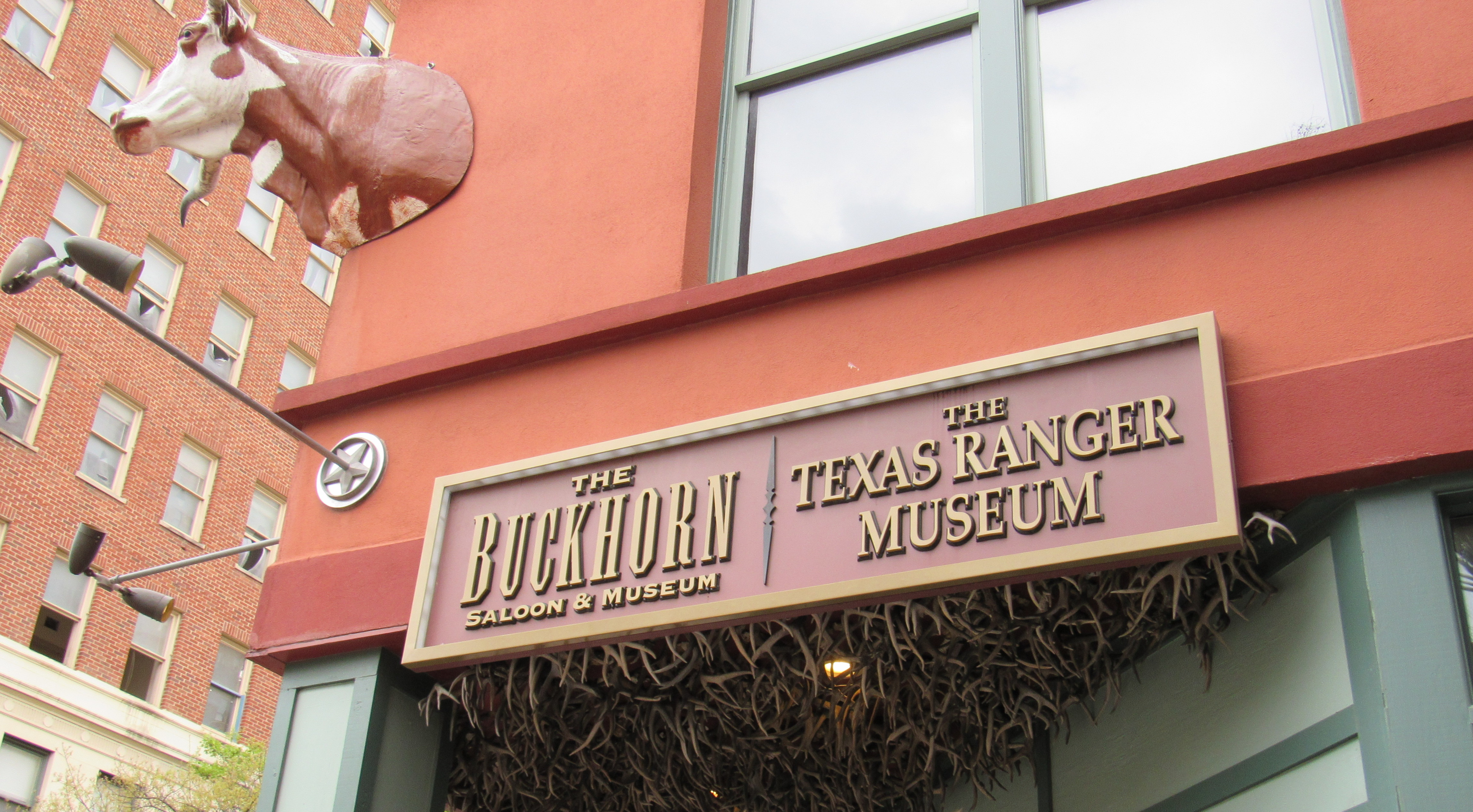
Museum entrance

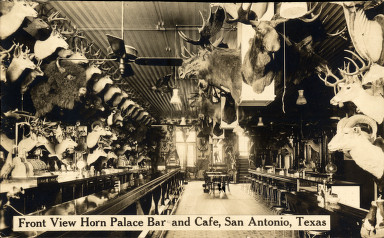
Postcard, circa 1904–1918

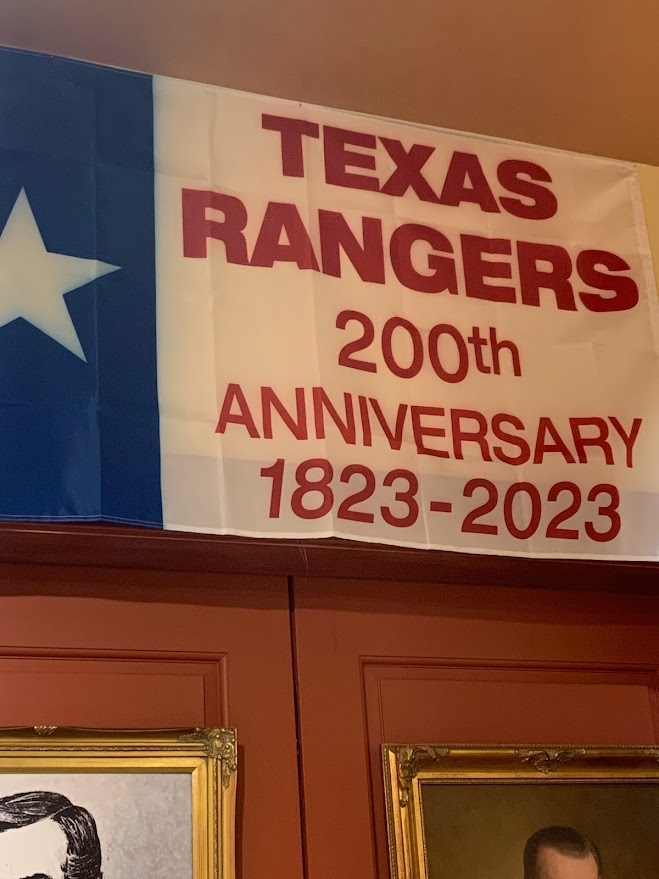
Flag Commemorating Bicentennial of the Texas Rangers hang in Texas Ranger Museum

== See also ==
- List of museums in Central Texas
- San Antonio Sporting District
