= Main and Military Plazas Historic District =

Historic district in Texas, United States

- U.S. National Register of Historic Places
- U.S. Historic district
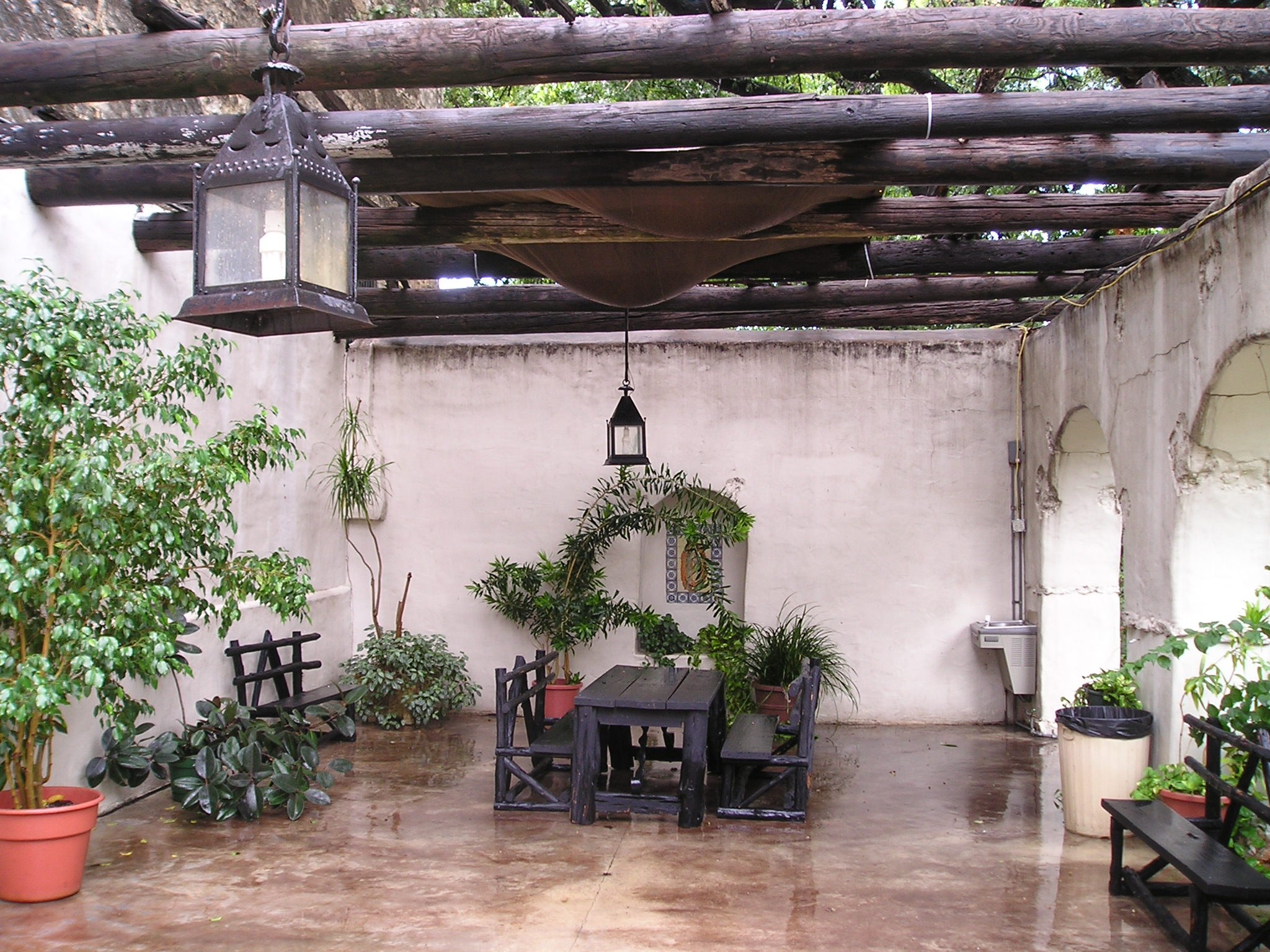
- Spanish Military Governor's Palace

- Location within Texas Location within the United States
- Location: Roughly bounded by San Antonio River, E. Nueva, Laredo, and Houston Streets, San Antonio, Texas
- Coordinates: 29°25′27″N 98°29′37″W
- Built: 1722
- Architect: Multiple
- Architectural style: Early commercial, Late Victorian, Spanish Colonial
- NRHP reference No.: 79002914 (original); 100004489 (increase)

Significant dates
- Added to NRHP: June 11, 1979
- Boundary increase: October 7, 2019

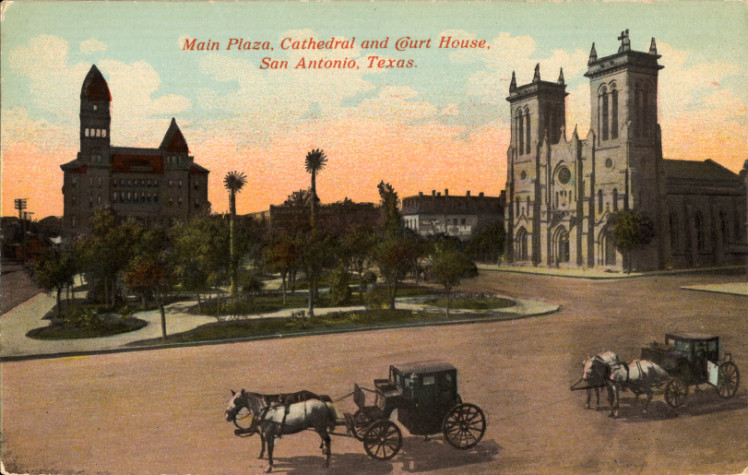
Main Plaza, Cathedral, and Court House, San Antonio, Texas (postcard, circa 1901-1914)

Main and Military Plazas Historic District is a historic district in San Antonio, Texas. It was listed on the National Register of Historic Places in 1979, with a boundary increase in 2019.

The area encompasses the old Presidio San Antonio de Béxar, where the Spanish troops and the military governor of Texas were stationed.

It includes the following separately-listed Registered Historic Places, one or more of which are National Historic Landmarks:

- Spanish Governor's Palace,
- Vogel Belt Building Complex (restored for city offices),
- Church of Nuestra Señora de la Candelaria y Guadalupe, also known as the Cathedral of San Fernando
- Bexar County Courthouse

== See also ==
- O. Henry House Museum
- Holiday Inn Express Riverwalk Area, a contributing structure, formerly the county jail
- Alamo Plaza Historic District

== Citations ==
- Edmondson, J.R. (2000), The Alamo Story-From History to Current Conflicts, Plano, TX: Republic of Texas Press, ISBN 1-55622-678-0
