= Holiday Inn Express Riverwalk Area =

Coordinates: 29°25′33″N 98°29′44″W

- Holiday Inn Express San Antonio N-Riverwalk Area
- U.S. National Register of Historic Places
- U.S. Historic district – Contributing property
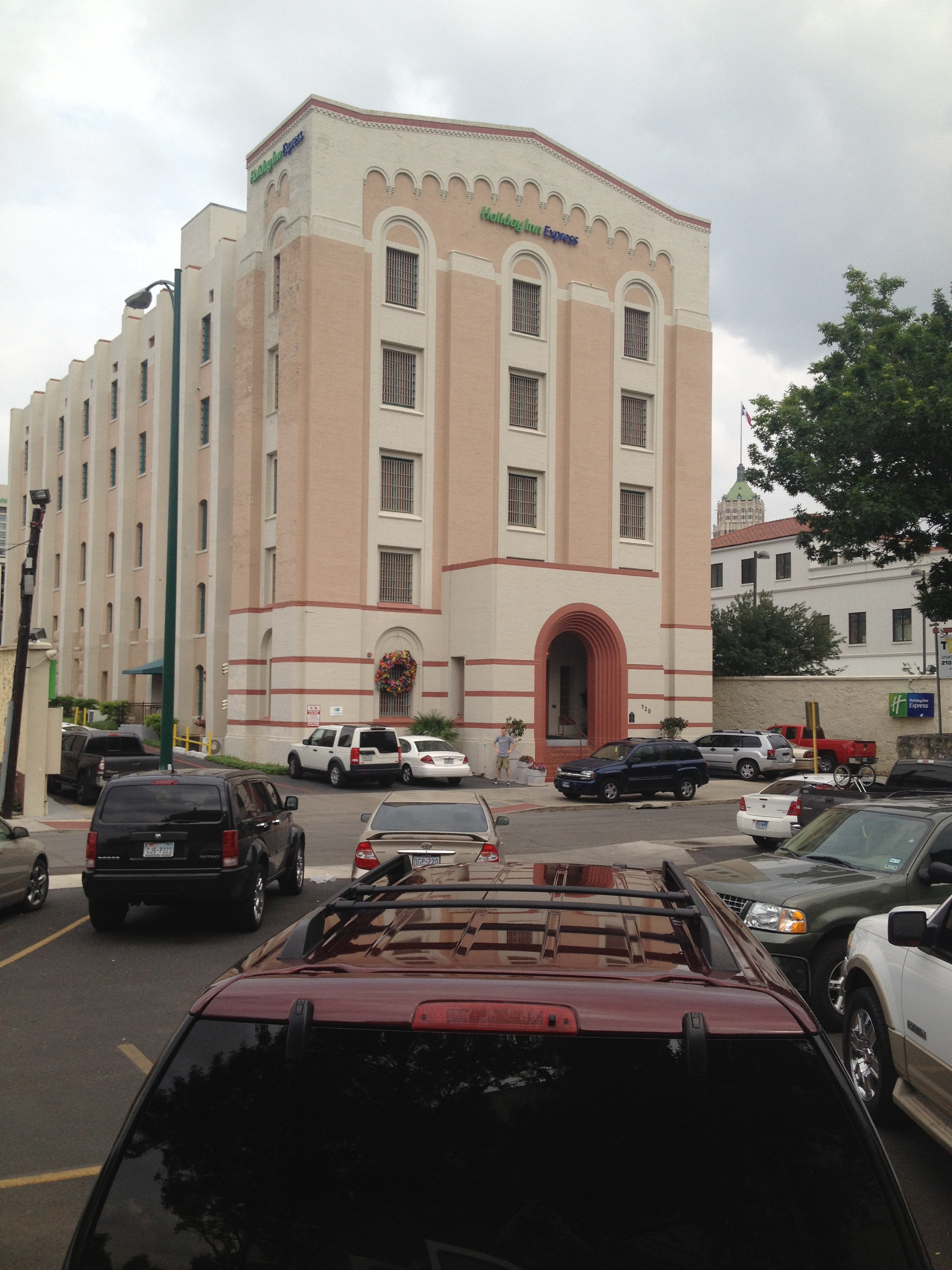
- Location: San Antonio, Texas; United States
- Built: 1878
- Architect: Alfred Giles
- Architectural style: Mission Revival
- Part of: Main and Military Plazas Historic District
- NRHP reference No.: 79002914
- Added to NRHP: 1979

The Holiday Inn Express San Antonio N-Riverwalk Area (formerly the Comfort Inn Alamo/Riverwalk) is a hotel in downtown San Antonio, Texas, USA.

Built in 1878, the five-story building is rich in history and served as the San Antonio Bexar County Jail until 1962. In recent years, before becoming a hotel, the building was a records depot for both the city and county and is currently listed on the National Register of Historic Places.

The five-story stone and brick structure was originally designed by prominent architect Alfred Giles as a two-story limestone facility containing twenty jail cells. Because of a rapid increase in the city's population, Henry T. Phelps designed a third-floor addition and remodeled the building in 1912, transforming it to the Mission Revival style.

In 1926, a second expansion was designed by Atlee and Robert Ayres, a father-and-son team and leading architects of their time. The entire appearance of the building was changed, with the addition of two floors, a reconfiguration of window openings, and a projecting entry with an arched entrance porch. The present façade's appearance dates to that design, when the structure was faced in brick.

A new jail was constructed in 1962; the old jail became the County Election Center and Archives Building. In 1983, it was used as a private records storage facility and later a city records storage facility, until 2000. In a 2002 rehabilitation, the building was repainted to emphasize the façade's brick detail.

The jail was once known as the Shrimp Hotel. The double entendre came about because the jail was located on Camaron Street (Calle del Camarón), named using the Spanish word for shrimp—which the locals applied to the crawfish in nearby San Pedro Creek—plentiful during the Spanish colonial period.
