= Old Lone Star Brewery =

- U.S. National Register of Historic Places
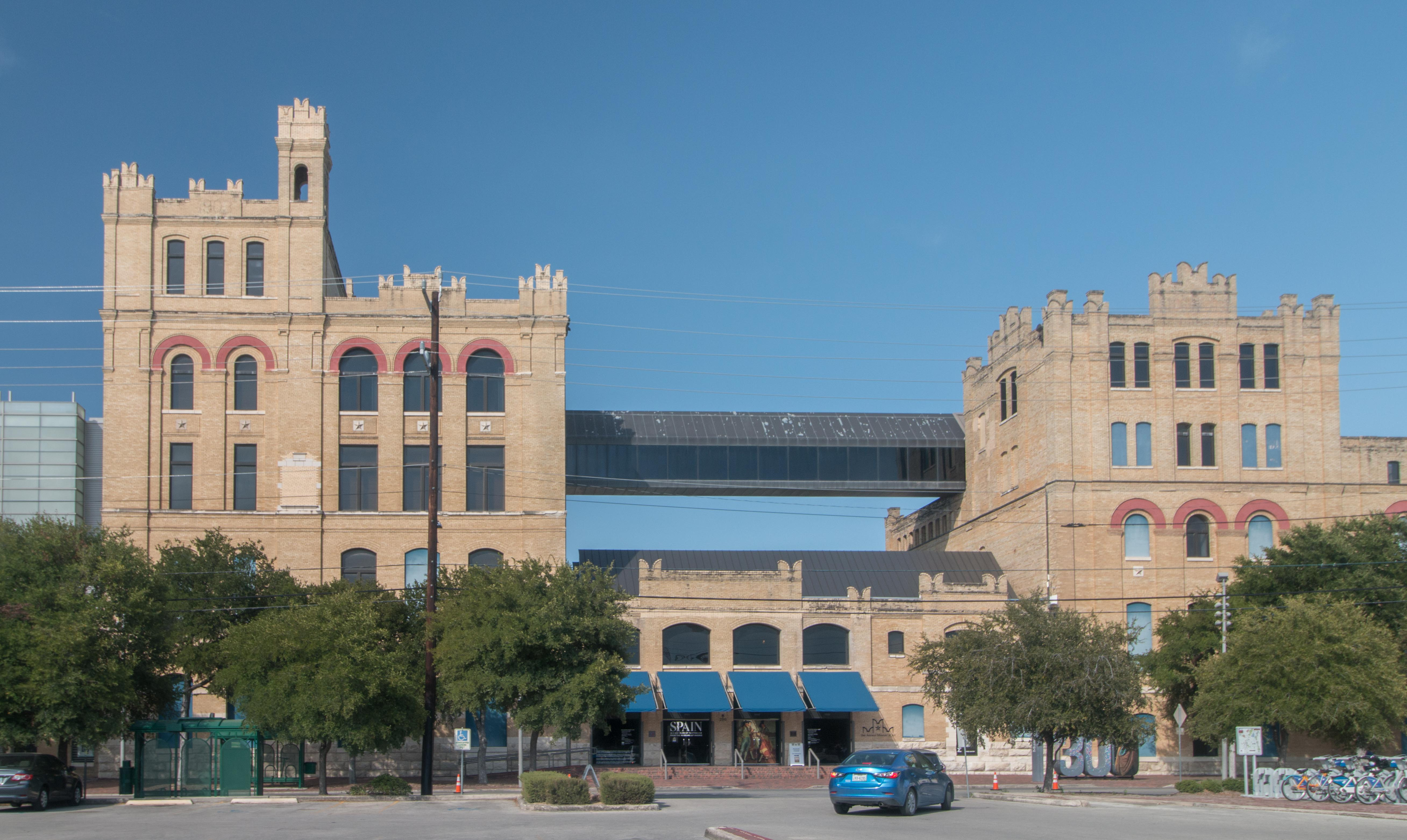
- Old Lone Star Brewery

- Location within Texas Location within the United States
- Location: 200 West Jones Ave, San Antonio, Texas; United States
- Coordinates: 29°26′13″N 98°28′53″W
- Built: 1895–1905
- NRHP reference No.: 72001354 (original); 79003544 (increase)
- Added to NRHP: October 26, 1972; Boundary increase September 25, 1979

The Old Lone Star Brewery complex is located at 200 West Jones Avenue, downtown San Antonio, county of Bexar, in the U.S. state of Texas. It was added to the National Register of Historic Places in 1972.

== History ==
The design of the complex has been described as "...done up with turrets and battlements the way Mad King Ludwig of Bavaria might have done it, if he had been a St. Louis beer brewer." It was built with funding from San Antonio businessmen John H. Kampmann and Edward Hope, as well as St. Louis businessman Adolphus Busch, who was president of the Lone Star Brewing Company.

In 1920 the 18th Amendment to the U.S. Constitution and the resulting Volstead Act prohibited alcoholic beverages in the country. During this period, the brewery housed the Lone Star Cotton Mills. Prohibition ended in the United States in 1933 when the 21st Amendment to the U.S. Constitution repealed the 18th Amendment. However, by that time the building had been temporarily abandoned, and the original brewery owners never occupied it again. The Lone Star name was taken over by a new company that opened a plant at 400 Lone Star Boulevard in San Antonio. The complex was occupied by several different businesses for three decades until it was sold to the San Antonio Museum Association in the 1970s. It is currently home to the San Antonio Museum of Art.

== Building details ==
Albert Beckmann and James Wahrenberger were supervising architects for E. Jugenfeld and Company when it designed and oversaw the construction of the brewery. The complex on the original NRHP designation is the 2-story attached central building, with an overhead 4th story bridge joining the east and west wings The attached east wing is a 5-story building, attached to a 4-story building. The attached west wing is more complex, with a 4-story building, attached to a 5-story building with a tower rising from the top of it. Next to that are two 1-story buildings joined in the middle by a 3-story building. There is a 2-story detached office building. To the rear of the main building are detached service buildings and a courtyard for employees and visitors.

A National Register of Historic Places boundary increase in 1979 added four structures that had been left off the 1972 designation due to resistance from the owner of the property. When the owner sold the property to the San Antonio Museum Association, the National Register of Historic Places was cleared to add the increase. Included in the increase were the 2 1/2-story boiler and equipment room, the 2-story ice manufacturing plant, the 2-story horse stable and vehicle storage, and the 1-story employee wash house.

== Gallery ==
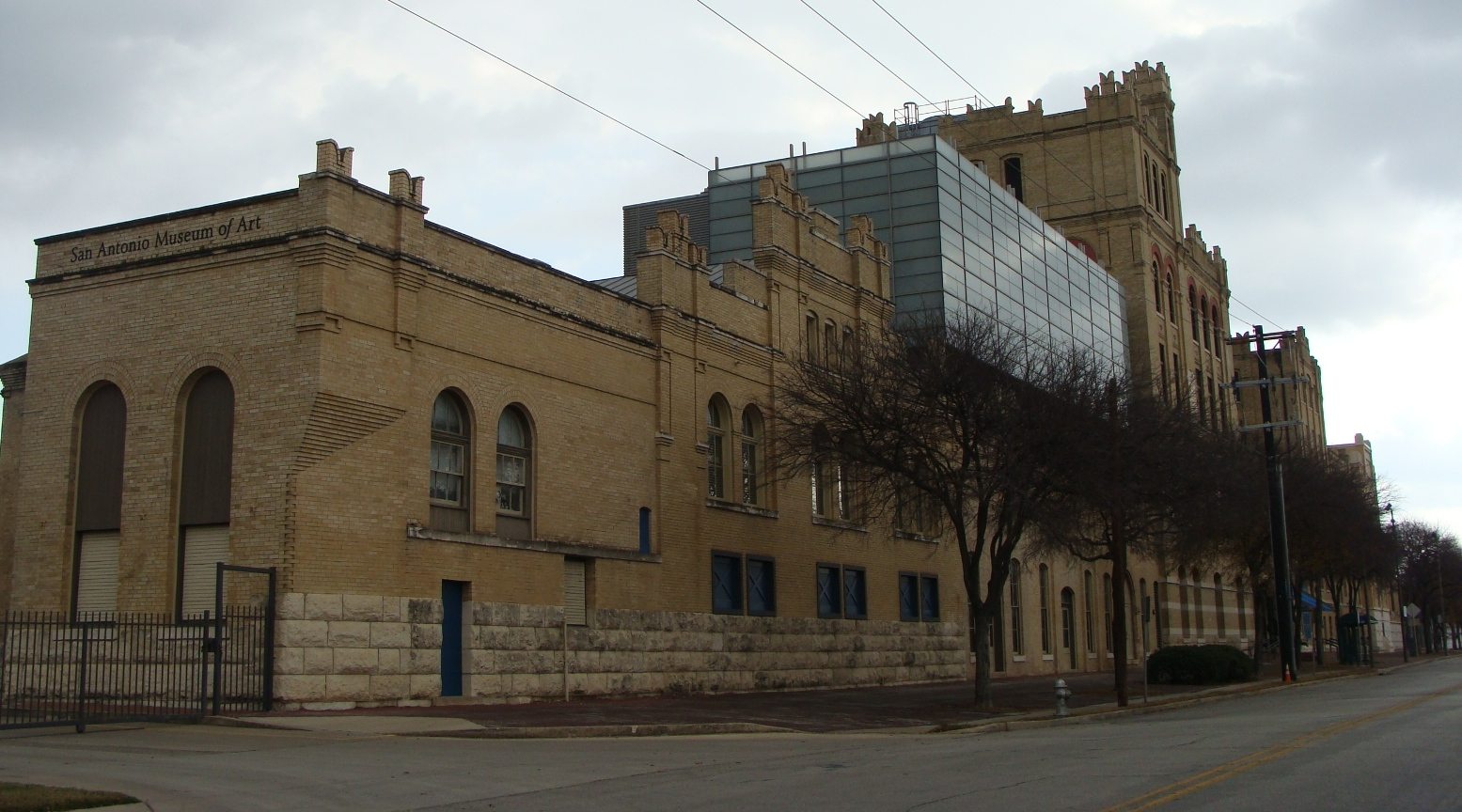
Old Lone Star Brewery taken from west side of building

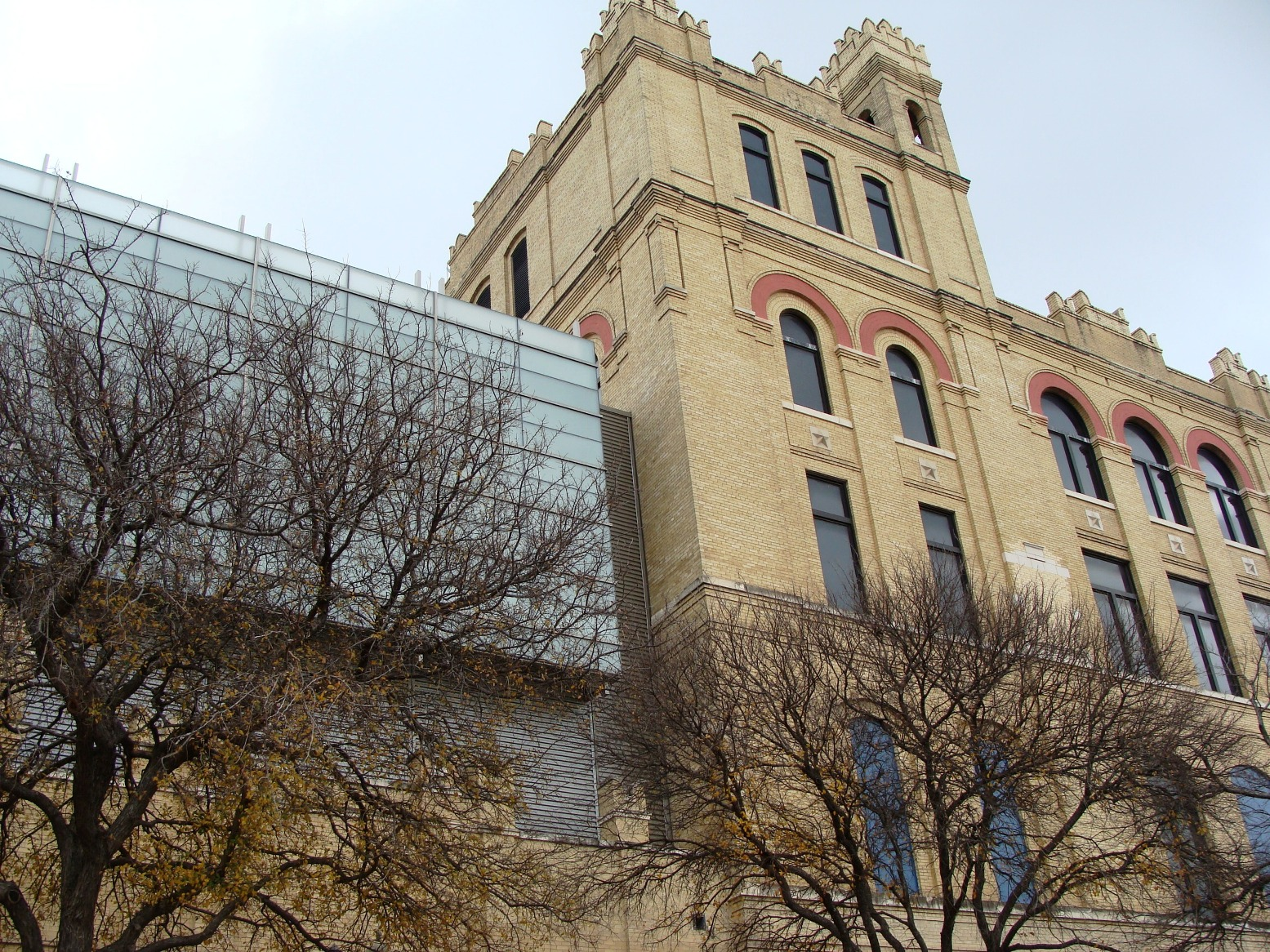
Old Lone Star Brewery west wing showing tower

== See also ==
- Lone Star Brewing Company
