= Lone Star Brewing Company =

Brewery in Texas, US

Coordinates: 29.402166°N 98.488294°W

- Industry: Alcoholic beverage
- Founded: 1884; 142 years ago (as Alamo Brewing Company of San Antonio)
- Founder: Adolphus Busch
- Headquarters: San Antonio, Texas, U.S.A
- Products: Beer
- Owner: Pabst Brewing Company

Lone Star Brewing Company was established in 1884, in San Antonio, Texas, and brewed Alamo Beer. It ceased operations in 1919. In 1940, also in San Antonio, a new and unrelated company was founded with the same name, and brewed Lone Star Beer.

As of 1999, Lone Star Brewing Company is owned by Pabst Brewing Company, and as of 2025 their beer is produced in Texas by Anheuser-Busch. The castle-like Old Lone Star Brewery building in San Antonio, which was built between 1895 and 1904, has been used since 1925 to house the art collection that is now the San Antonio Museum of Art.

== History ==
It was made in San Marcos before the Alamo Brewing Company of San Antonio in 1874, the company was purchased by Anheuser-Busch in 1895, when it was housed in the Old Lone Star Brewery located on 200 West Jones Avenue. The original Lone Star Bottling Works opened in San Antonio in the 1890s, and by 1903 was selling 65,000 barrels of beer annually.

With the end of Prohibition in 1933, a new brewery under the name Sabinas Brewing Company was constructed at 600 Lone Star Boulevard and operated under the Sabinas name until 1939. The company then operated under name to the Champion Brewing Company until 1940, when it was purchased by the Muchlebach Brewing Company of Kansas City, Missouri. The company rebranded itself as the Lone Star Brewing Company and began officially producing Lone Star Beer that year. The brewery also produced Lone Star Light, low-calorie Lime Lager (1970), and Brut Super Premium (1969).

In 1940, brewer Peter Kreil from Munich created the formula for the first beer to actually be called Lone Star beer. In 1949, under the leadership of Harry Jersig, Lone Star went public. By 1960, the brewery had 651 employees and by 1965, annual sales exceeded 1 million barrels.

In 1956, the Lone Star Brewery purchased the Buckhorn Saloon and Museum collection. Harry Jersig, president of the brewery and a friend of the Friedrich's, continued to add to the collection and had a special building erected on the Lone Star grounds to house the collection.

In the 1970s, Lone Star's sales benefited from Jerry Retzloff, former marketing and promotions manager for Lone Star Beer and his close association with Willie Nelson, the Austin music scene and their Giant Armadillo. The beer is mentioned frequently in the title track of Red Steagall's 1976 album "Lone Star Beer and Bob Wills Music".

Olympia Brewing Co. of Washington bought Lone Star in 1976, and it changed hands again in 1983 when Wisconsin's G. Heileman bought Olympia.

Detroit-based Stroh Brewery Co. then bought Heileman and closed the San Antonio brewery in 1996, moving beer production to Longview, Texas, and signaling the end of San Antonio as a major brewing town. In the 1990s, Lone Star introduced Lone Star Ice and Lone Star Dry for a short period of time.

Milwaukee-based Pabst bought most of the Stroh brands, including Lone Star, in 1999, and began brewing Lone Star at the San Antonio Pearl Brewery to great fanfare. In 1999, the company began to sponsor Texas singers and musicians, such as Two Tons of Steel, with the beer's "It's a Texas Thing" advertising campaign. In 2000, the Pearl Brewery was closed because it was outdated and would have been too expensive to continue to operate or to bring up to date. Production of Lone Star is currently contracted out to non-Pabst-owned breweries (e.g. Miller Brewing Company in Fort Worth and, beginning in early 2025, Anheuser-Busch in Houston).

== In popular culture ==
=== Television ===
- Due to similarities, the Alamo Beer pictured in the television series King of the Hill is thought to be a winking tribute to Lone Star.
- In series 2, episode 2 of the UK TV series Skins, Michelle wears a shirt with the company's logo.
- J. R. Ewing is seen at a bar with a bottle of Lone Star in season 12, episode 20 (originally aired March 31, 1989), of Dallas.
- Lone Star Beer was the underwriter for the PBS music program Austin City Limits from 1976 to 1983 (seasons 1–8).
- It is also featured in the first episode of the third season, and 18th episode of the seventh season of The Big Bang Theory.
- Lone Star Beer is the favorite beer of George Cooper, Sr., (played by Lance Barber), in Young Sheldon, the spin-off program from The Big Bang Theory that premiered in 2017.
- Detective Rust Cohle, played by Matthew McConaughey, drinks a six pack during his interview in True Detective. The beer can also be seen numerous times throughout the first season.
- Carter and her friends are seen drinking Lone Star Beer in the third episode of Finding Carter.
- This beer is also presented in almost every bar scene of the sixth season of The Mentalist.
- It is the beer of choice for Tim Riggins in NBC's Friday Night Lights.
- Lone Star is one of the beers of choice of horror host Joe Bob Briggs in many of his shows.
- In season 7, episode 13 of Mad Men Don Draper, played by Jon Hamm, is seen drinking the beer with several war veterans at a fundraiser.

=== Theatre ===
- Lone Star Beer is a central theme of the one-act play Lone Star by James McLure.

=== Film ===
- Lone Star Beer is featured prominently in the Houston-based film Urban Cowboy of 1980.
- The beer is featured in the diner scene of the 1982 film, Six Pack.
- The beer is also shown in the movie Deep Impact in the bar scene when the crew of the Messias are having drinks.
- In the 2014 biographic film American Sniper, Chris Kyle and his brother are shown drinking Lone Star and a case of the beer is shown next to the TV.
- In the 2016 film Everybody Wants Some!!, Lone Star Beer is referenced and regularly seen.
- Lone Star Beer is also seen in the 2018 film Galveston starring Ben Foster.
- In 'X' (2022), the canned beer is seen during diner - and a guitar session - at around 45 minutes into the movie.
- Lone Star Beer is featured in the 2022 film Pearl.
- Lone Star Beer is drunk by Sailor and Bobby at a bar in David Lynch's Wild at Heart (1990)

=== Music ===
- Actor and country singer-songwriter-actor Christian Kane references Lone Star Beer in his song "American Made".
- Country singer Whitey Morgan references Lone Star Beer in his 2009 song "Buick City".
- The Charlie Daniels Band references Lone Star Beer in their song "Texas".
- Terry Allen's song "Amarillo Highway" from the album Lubbock (On Everything) (1979) makes reference to a "trunk full of Pearl and Lone Star."
- Country music singer-songwriter Pat Green references Lone Star beer in his song "Here We Go", singing, "There's Lone Star beer in my cereal..."
- The beer is referenced in the Johnny Paycheck song "11 Months and 29 Days"; the lyrics include: "Keep the Lone Star cold, the dance floor hot while I'm gone."
- In the David Allen Coe song "Spotlight" there is a line saying "Tell Lone Star Beer that I'm dry."
- Country-western singer-songwriter Red Steagall's song "Lone Star Beer and Bob Wills' Music" from the album of the same name from 1976 references Lone Stone Beer in its chorus which goes: "Lone Star Beer and Bob Wills' music, when I hear faded love I feel at home. Lone Star Beer and Bob Will's music have kept my heart alive since you've been gone."
- Texas indie rock band Lift to Experience mention Lone Star Beer as a signifier with a prophecy in the lyrics to the song "Just As Was Told" on the 2001 album "The Texas Jerusalem Crossroads."
- Country artist Vinny Tovar references Lone Star Beer in his song "Leaving With My Heart."
- Texas Country artist Gary P. Nunn references Lone Star Beer in the chorus of his song "It's A Texas Thing".
- Country artist Dale Watson (whose band is named "The Lone Stars") always refers to Lone Star as "his favorite beer". He carries it on tour and always plays a short musical jingle introducing the beer and extolling its virtues.
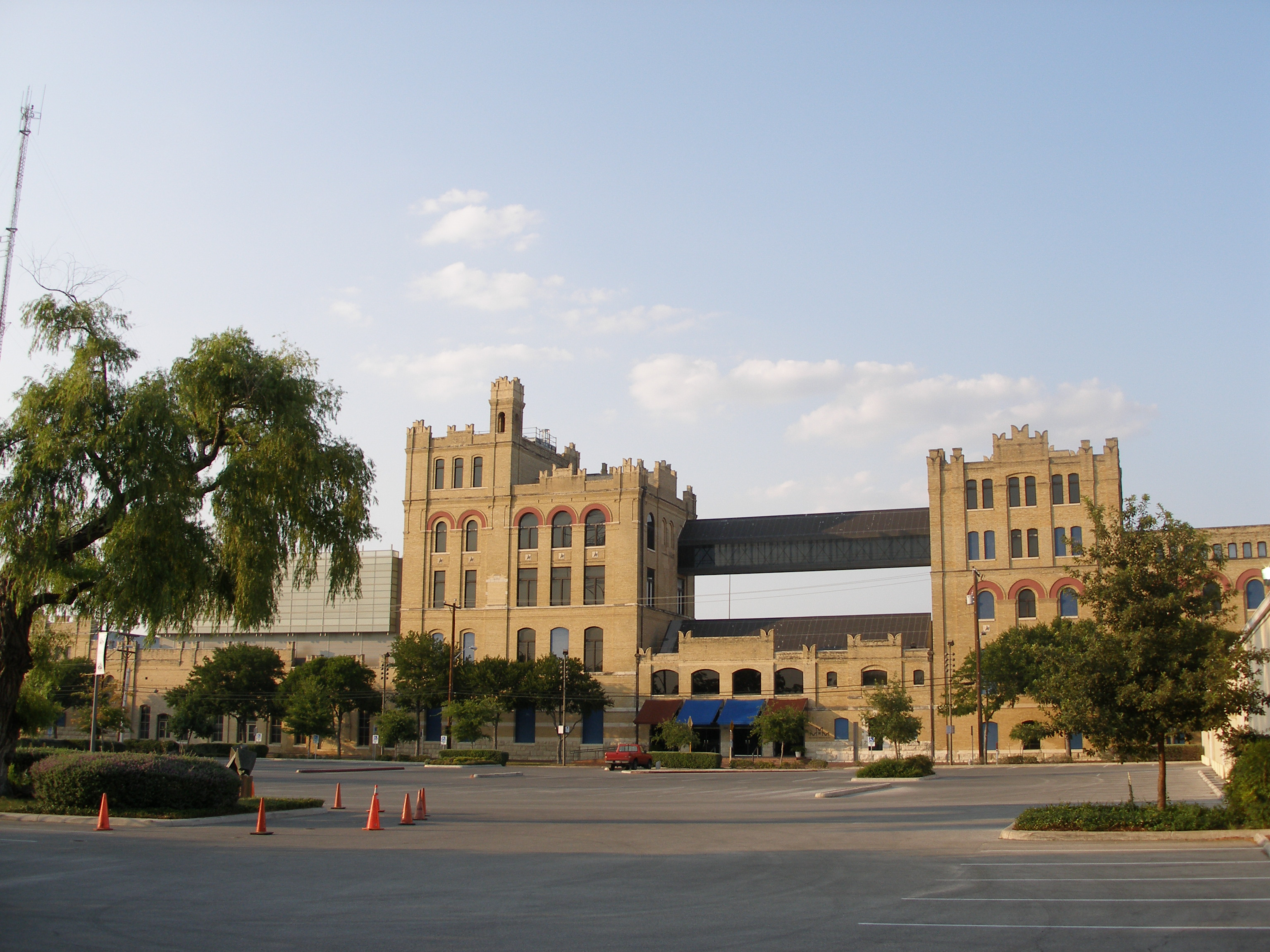
1884 Lone Star Brewery, 200 West Jones Avenue, San Antonio, TX

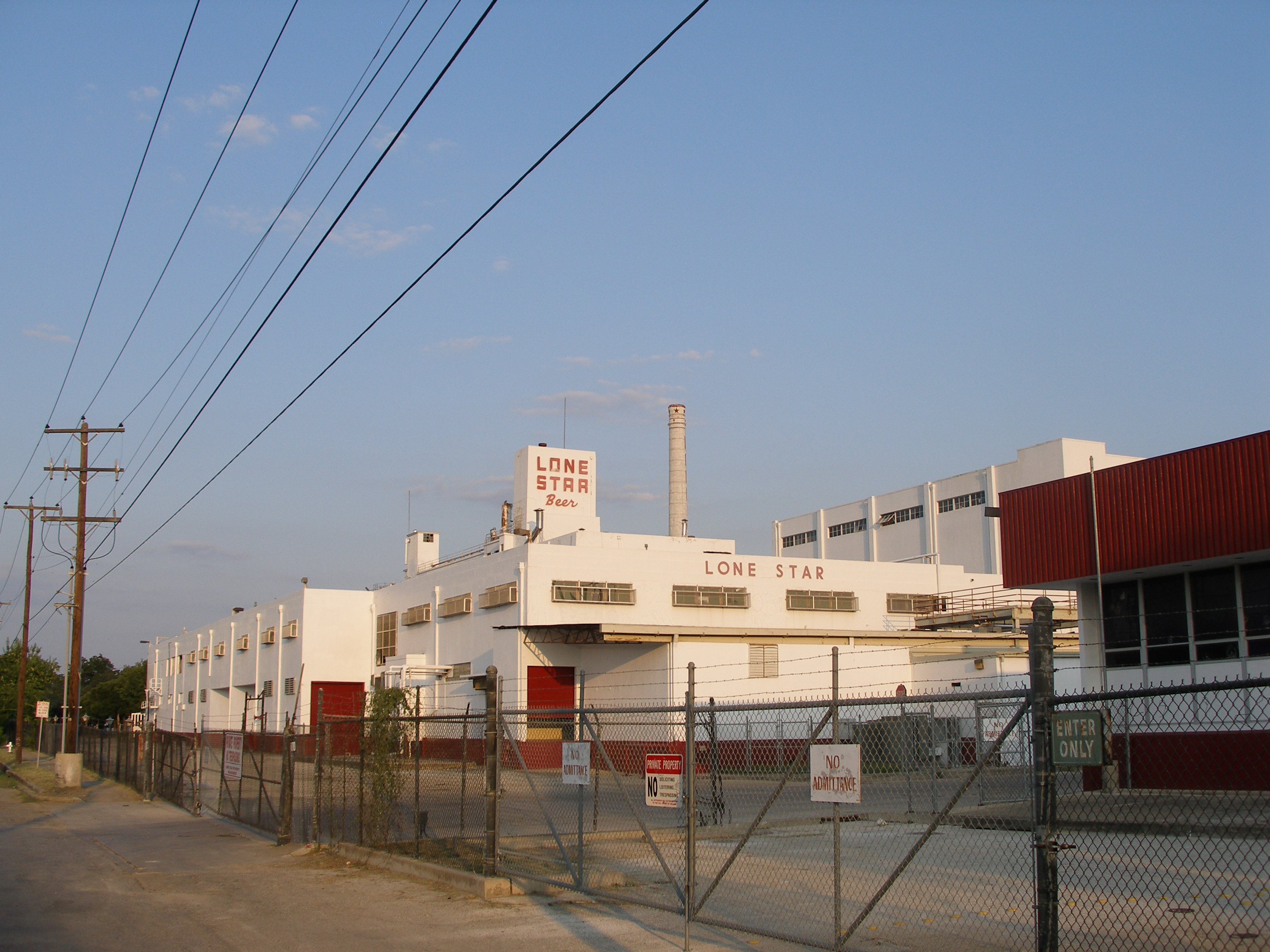
1933 Lone Star Brewery, 600 Lone Star Boulevard, San Antonio, TX

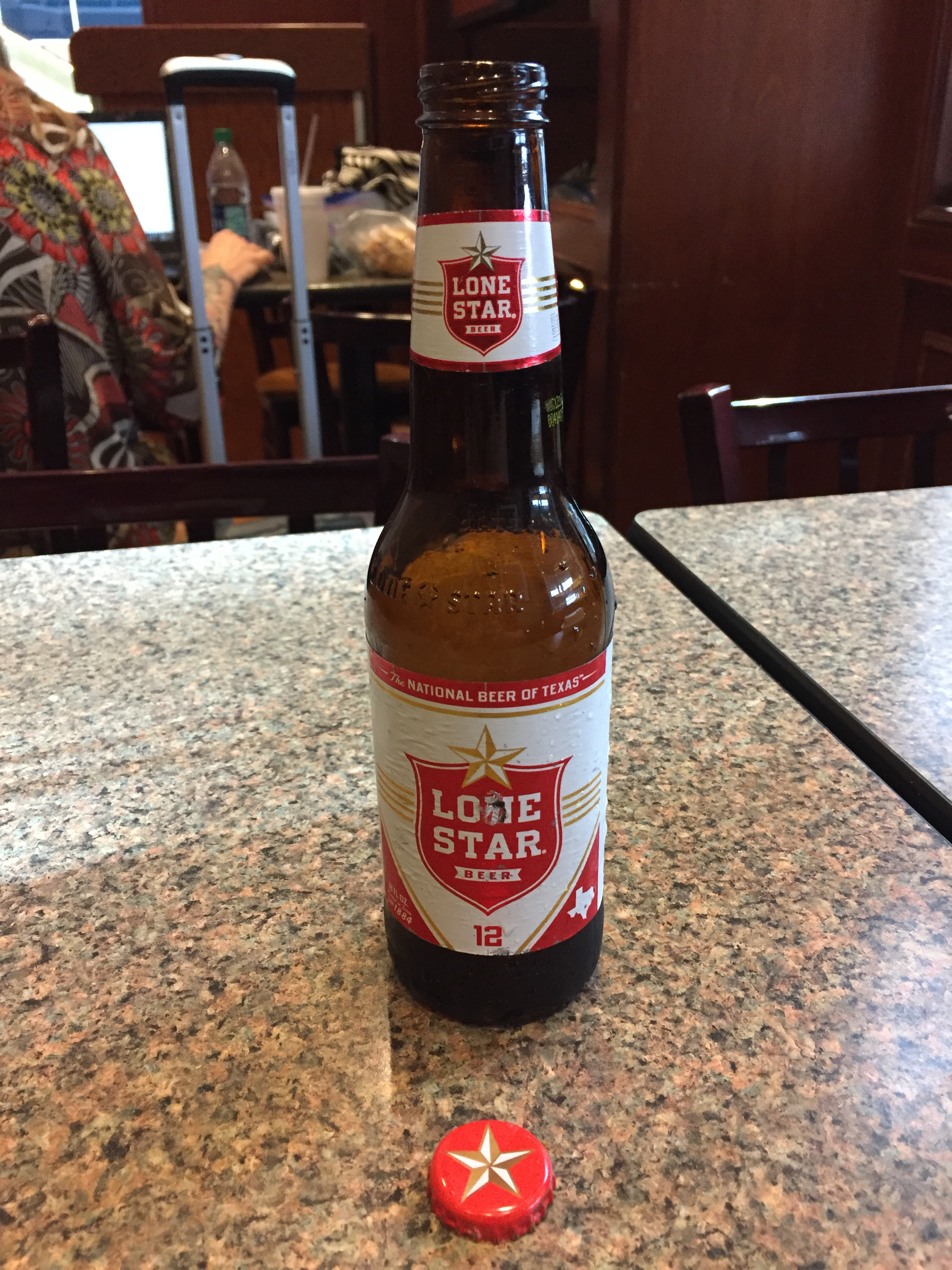
Lone Star Beer Bottle

== See also ==
- List of defunct breweries in the United States
