= Texas Museum of Science and Technology =

Texas Museum of Science & Technology
- Established: 2015
- Dissolved: TXMOST is now CLOSED due to a lack of funding.
- Location: Cedar Park, Texas
- Coordinates: 30.541603°N 97.776136°W
- Type: Science museum
- Director: Ed Slane
- Website: www.txmost.org at the Wayback Machine (archived November 12, 2020)

The Texas Museum of Science & Technology (TXMOST) opened in March 2015 in an interim facility in Cedar Park, Texas.

The museum houses the Austin area’s first planetarium, traveling exhibitions, and the permanent Timewalk exhibit, created from a gift of fossil and dinosaur bone collections which has toured the world. Plans for the interim facility include expanding the mobile planetarium outreach programs, conducting field trips and summer/holiday camps, and building a collection of permanent exhibits about science and technology.

== History ==
Founded initially as the "Friends of the Austin Planetarium," then later shortened to Austin Planetarium, the project began its operations in the area by offering an outreach program through its mobile planetarium project. Due to the success of the program, support developed for a permanent facility for science and technology education.

On March 20, 2015, an interim facility (~30,000 sq ft) was opened to the public and the organization's name was changed to the Texas Museum of Science & Technology. The museum is the first of its kind in Central Texas, an area that is home to many companies and organizations related to science and technology.

== Exhibits ==
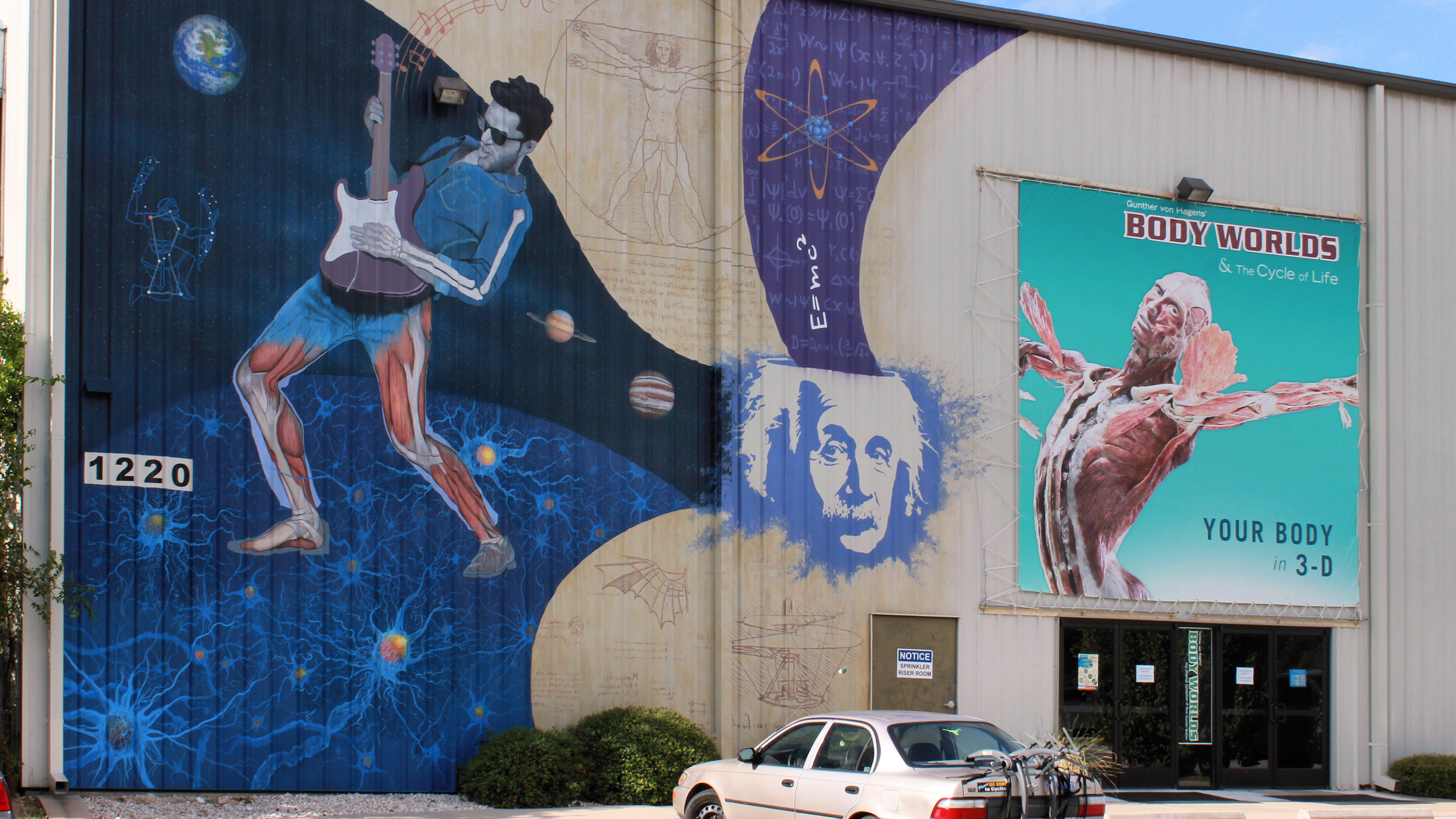
Museum exterior in 2015

=== Current ===
TXMOST is now CLOSED due to a lack of funding by the Board of Directors.

TXMOST’s two permanent exhibit spaces contain the 33 ft geodesic dome planetarium, with live star shows and pre-rendered movies running throughout the day; and the Timewalk exhibit, which showcases life on Earth from the earliest fossils to the Age of Mammals.

The museum also hosts traveling special exhibits. In late 2017, there were two traveling exhibits. Leonardo da Vinci: Machines in Motion features interactive machines created from his original designs. This exhibition gives you the chance to explore some of da Vinci’s works as recreated by modern-day engineers and artisans, including his visionary glider, armored tank, ornithopter, and more. Drugs: Costs and Consequences is an exhibit from the Drug Enforcement Administration Museum that began a national tour in 2002.

=== Past ===
The traveling exhibit Tutankhamun: “Wonderful Things” from the Pharaoh’s Tomb was on display from November 2016 through September 2017.

Body Worlds - the Cycle of Life was the main exhibit at the opening of the museum, and remained until November, 2015. In addition, TXMOST, in partnership with the Exploratorium, displayed a number of hands-on science exhibits demonstrating aspects of physics such as light or sound. The museum also hosted a traveling exhibit from NASA’s Johnson Space Center that explored space exploration and celebrated the opening of the museum’s 33 ft digital planetarium, and displayed the Nikon Small World Microphotography Competition winners for 2015.

== Affiliations ==
The Texas Museum of Science & Technology is a member of:

- Association of Science-Technology Centers (ASTC)
- Austin Museum Partnership (AMP)
- Texas Association of Nonprofit Organizations
