= Dick's Classic Garage =

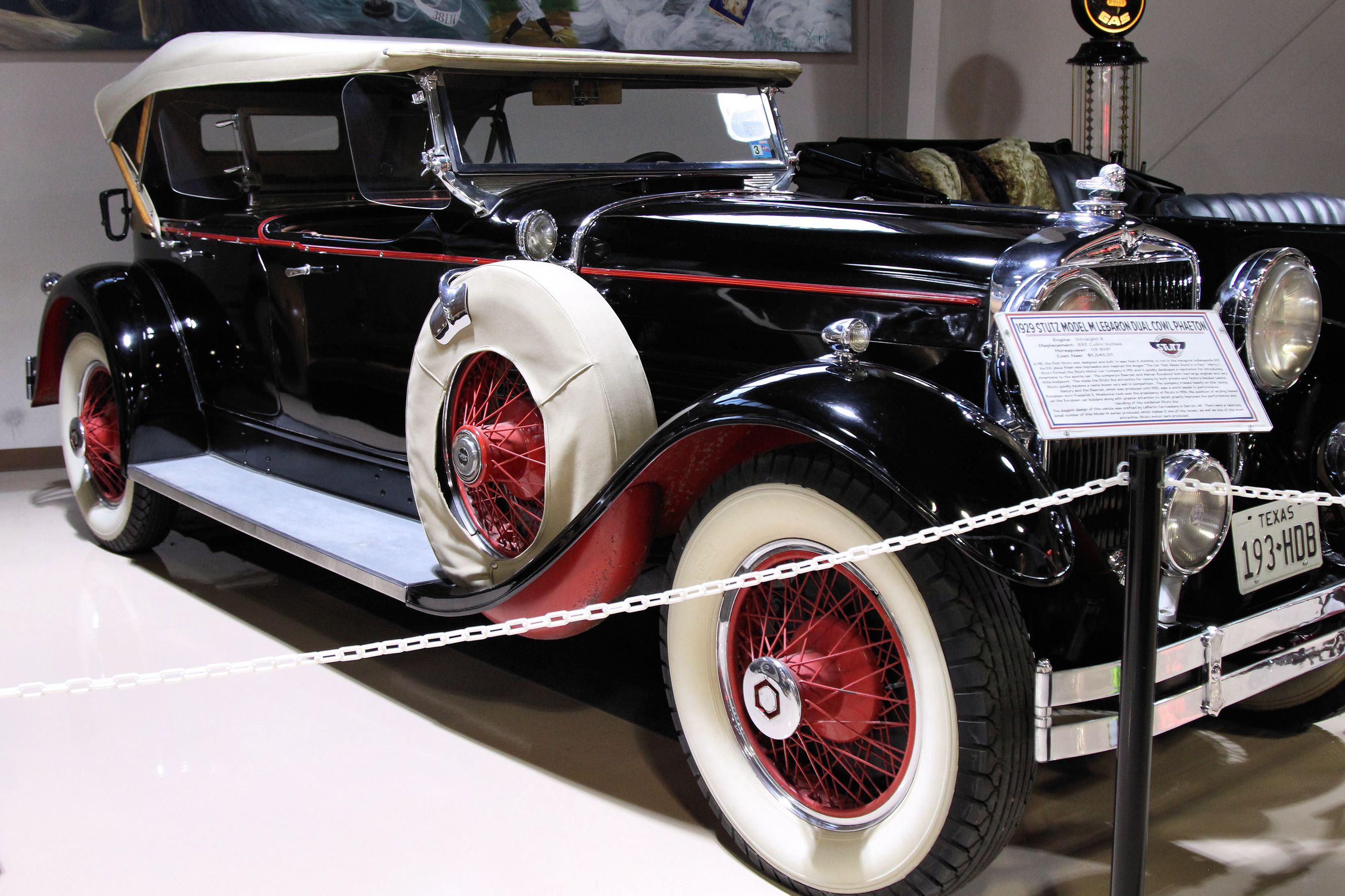
- A 1929 Stutz Model M LeBaron at Dick's Classic Garage

- Location within Texas
- Established: 1980
- Location: San Marcos, Texas
- Coordinates: 29°51′53.12″N 97°57′55.38″W
- Type: Automobile museum
- Collection size: American cars, automobilia
- Website: www.dicksclassicgarage.com

Dick's Classic Garage was an automobile museum in San Marcos, Texas. It was founded in 2009 by Dick Burdick, a Texas businessman and car collector, who also operated the now defunct Central Texas Museum of Automotive History in Rosanky, Texas. Dick's Classic Garage was inaugurated in 2009. It closed to the public on December 31, 2018.

The museum showcases American vehicles and memorabilia from the 1930s though the 1950s and displays a 1948 Tucker Sedan (chassis number 1050; this is the lowest mileage Tucker with 0.4 miles on the odometer). The museum also includes a restoration area.

== Central Texas Museum of Automotive History ==
Central Texas Museum of Automotive History
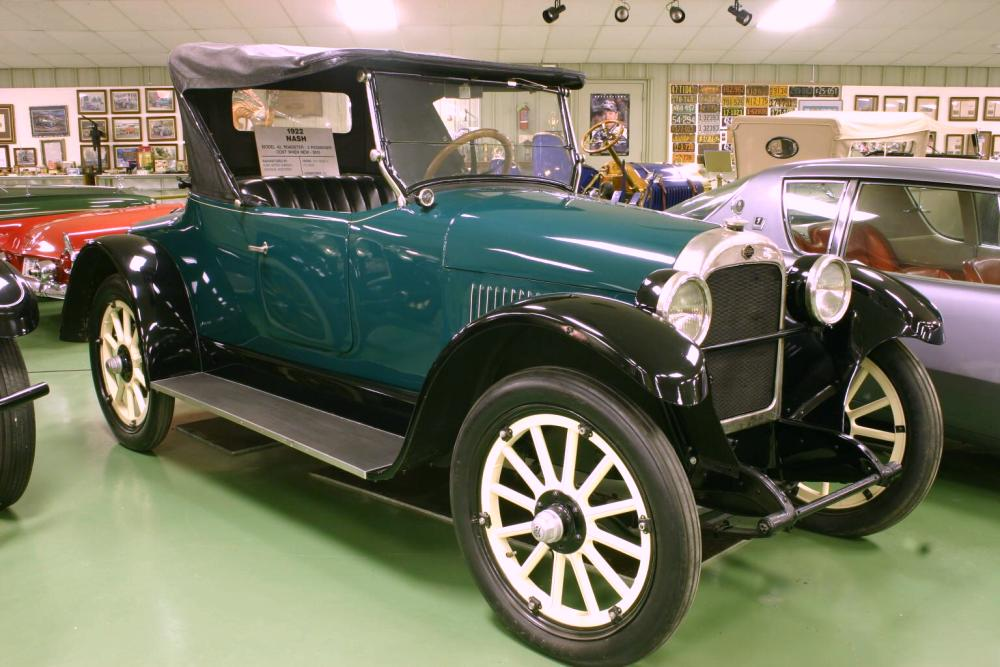
- 1922 Nash roadster Model 42

- Location within Texas
- Established: 1980
- Dissolved: 2012
- Location: Rosanky, Texas
- Coordinates: 29°57′44.25″N 97°18′3.49″W
- Type: Automobile museum
- Collection size: 250 cars, automobilia
- Website: www.ctmah.org www.dicksclassicgarage.com

The Central Texas Museum of Automotive History was an automobile museum located in Rosanky, Texas and was also founded by Dick Burdick. This museum operated from 1980 until 2012.

=== Collection ===
The museum had a collection of American and European cars from the 20th century, focussing on European and American cars before 1929. Included in its 125 fully restored cars were: Stanley Steamers, Duesenbergs and Jaguars. The facility also included an extensive automobile library.

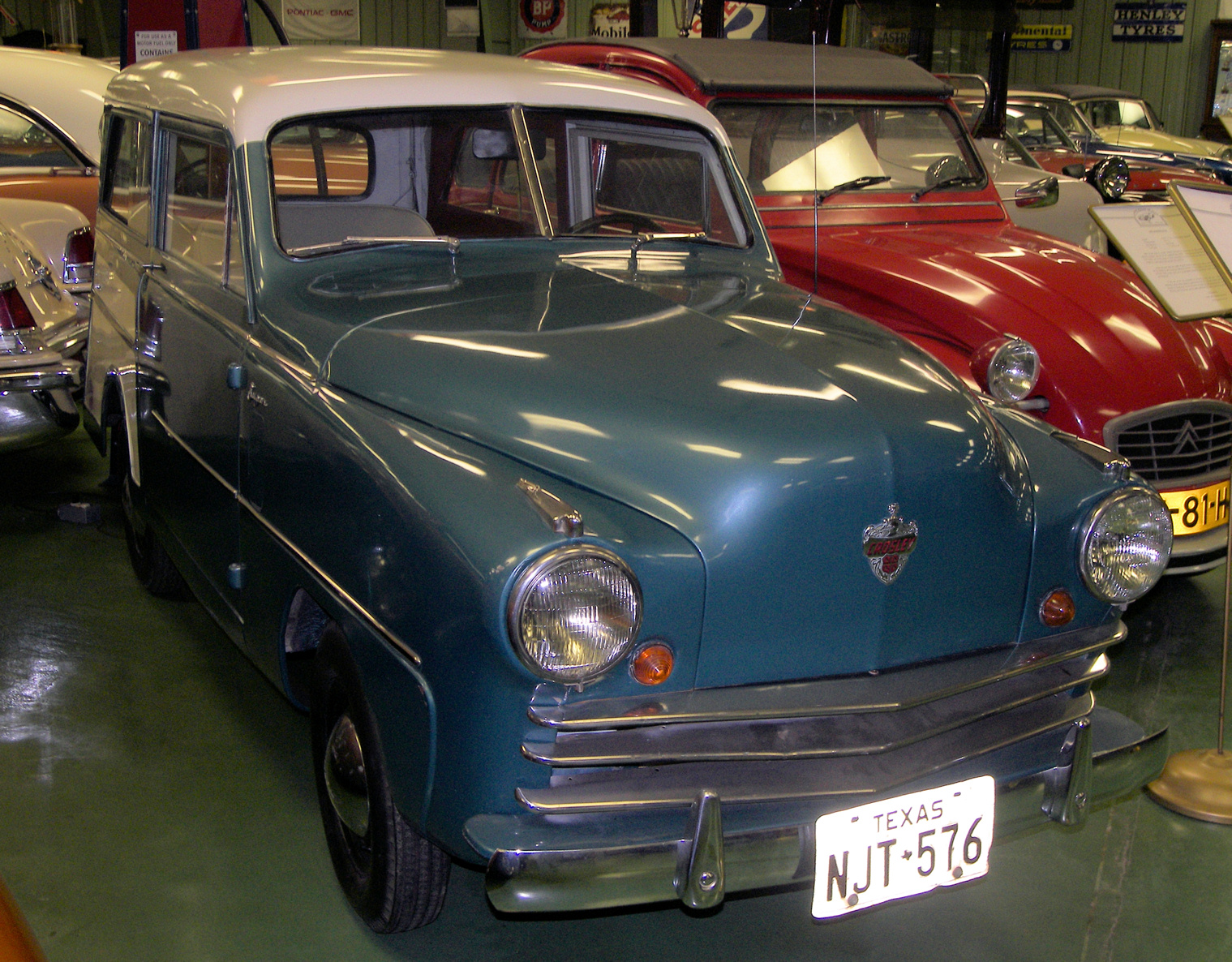
A 1950 Crosley station wagon

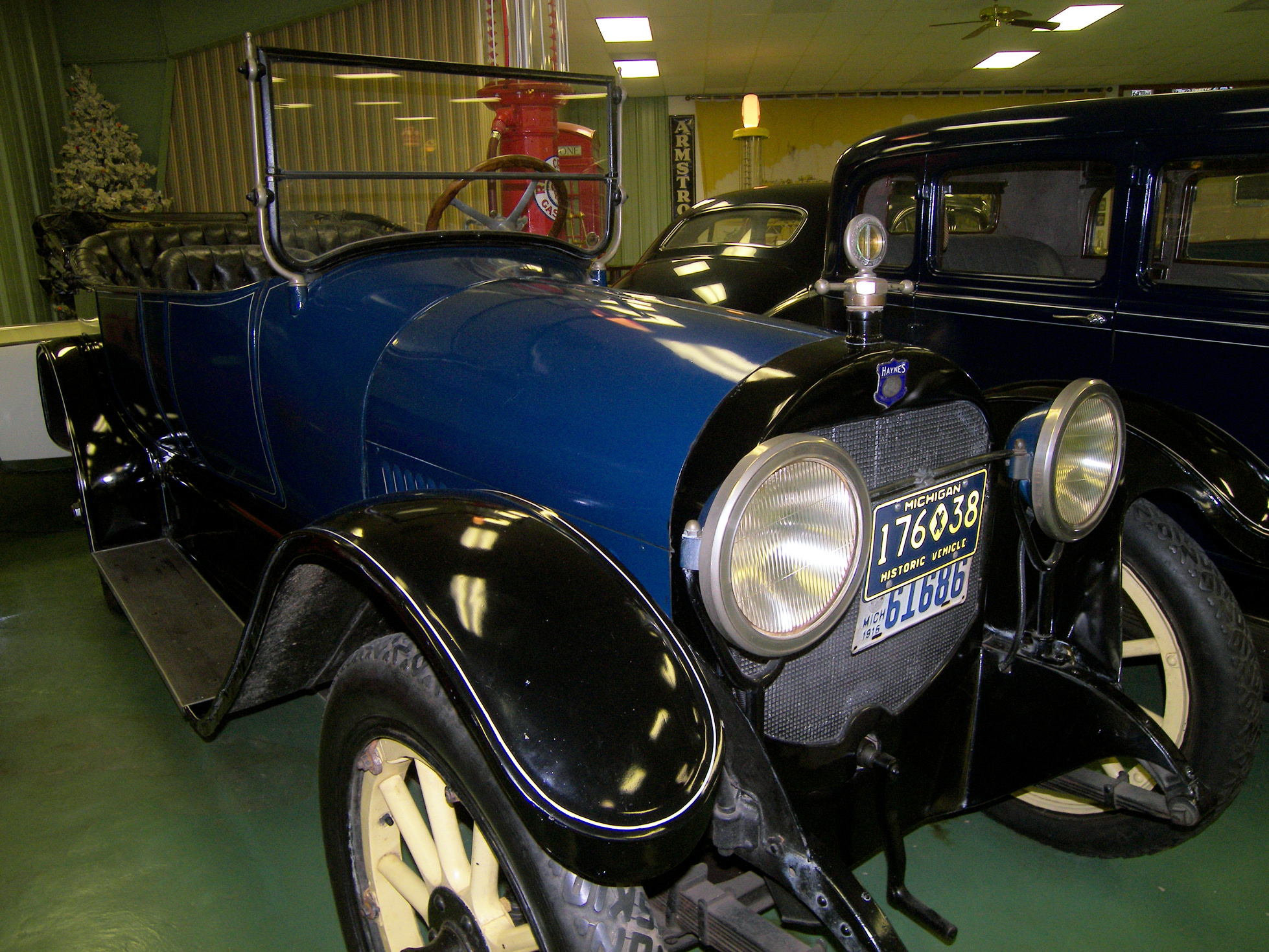
1916 Haynes

=== Closure ===
In 2018 the museum announced that it would close it doors. The reason given for its closing was to help provide funding for the newly established division Dick's Classic Garage. Ninety of the cars were taken to auction. The remainder of the cars in the collection were moved to Dick's Classic Garage. The plan was to be able to provide funding for the new museum much longer than income from admissions taken would sustain.
