= San Antonio Downtown and River Walk Historic District =

Historic district in Texas, United States

- U.S. National Register of Historic Places
- U.S. Historic district
- Location within Texas Location within the United States
- Coordinates: 29°24′40″N 98°29′34″W
- Architect: Multiple
- NRHP reference No.: 100002128
- Added to NRHP: February 23, 2018

The San Antonio Downtown and River Walk Historic District is an amalgamation of residential and commercial sites. 197 contributing properties and 50 non-contributing properties were taken into consideration when evaluating the area for the National Register of Historic Places (NRHP) and also for the Recorded Texas Historic Landmarks (RTHL). The more than a century of economic growth and business/tourist development beginning in the mid-19th century is reflected in the city's architecture.

The commercial buildings showcase a wide variety of architectural styles and movements. Among the prominent architects who were involved in designing this area of San Antonio were Atlee Ayres, Alfred Giles, James Riely Gordon, Robert H.H. Hugman, Herbert M. Greene, Adams & Adams (Carleton W. Adams and his uncle Carl C. Adams) and Millard Sheets.

Listed below are 37 properties denoted as significant to the designation of the National Register of Historic Places listings in Bexar County, Texas. Four of the properties are also included on La Villita historic district. The 214-acre geographical boundaries covered by this NRHP designation are the San Antonio River Walk and surrounding blocks, bounded by Cameron, Augusta, Sixth, Bonham, losoya and Tolle Place.

San Antonio Downtown and River Walk Historic District
Property	Image	Address	NRHP	RTHL	Notes	Ref(s)
(Old) Alamo National Bank Building		314 / 316 E Commerce St. (Old) Alamo National Bank Bldg. 1984.	101807			
Alamo National Bank Building		105 S. St. Mary's St	1046455			
Aztec Theater and Building		104 N St. Marys St.	101332			
Barr Building		213 Broadway	104134			
Otto Bombach House		231 S Alamo St.	101625		(La Villita) 1972 – Built by German immigrant Bombach in the mid-19th century. Acquired and restored by the San Antonio Conservation Society.	
Brady Building. – Empire Theater		200 / 204 E Houston St.	103857		Built in 1913 as a vaudeville venue, and currently dba the Charline McCombs Empire Theatre.	
Builders Exchange Building		152 E Pecan	103832			
Burns Building		401 E Houston St.	104123			
Calcasieu Building		202–214 Broadway	104149			
Central Trust Company Building		603 Navarro St.	1061705			
City Public Service Company Building		201 N St. Marys St.	103841			
Cos House		503 Villita St.	101628	5029001072	(La Villita) Home of Mexican general Martín Perfecto de Cos, who therein signed the Articles of Capitulation on Dec. 9, 1835, ending the Siege of Béxar.	
Jeremiah Dashiell House		511 Villita St.	101627		(La Villita) Built ca.1840 by Jeremiah Yellott Dashiell, one of the physicians who built Louisville Medical College in Kentucky.	
First National Bank Building		239 E Commerce St. 1972	1013635			
Garcia-Garza House		214 W Salinas	101734			
Gunter Hotel		205 E Houston St	103872			
Havana Apts.		1015 Navarro St.	1150388			
Henshaw House		515 Villita St.	101626		Formerly Martinez house, (La Villita) 1972 The Fig Tree Restaurant operated for a number of years at this address.	
Robert E Lee Hotel		111 W Travis St.	101211			
Majestic Theatre		224 E Houston St.	103861	5029005972	Also a National Historic Landmark	
Maverick Building		606 N. Presa/400 E Houston St.	104056			
Maverick-Carter House		119 Taylor	103953			
Milam Building 2014		115 E Travis	101393			
The St. Anthony Hotel		300 E Travis St. Hotel St.	104033		Built in 1909 by affluent cattlemen, as a luxury hotel for wealthy tourists.	
St. Mark's Episcopal Church		315 E Pecan	104030 A	5029005056	Claudia Alta "Lady Bird" Taylor and Lyndon B. Johnson were married at St. Mark's by Rev. Arthur R. McKinstry on November 17, 1934.	
San Antonio Casino Club Building		102 W Crockett St.	139008	5029000752	Built by German immigrants in 1854, and chartered in 1857, notable guests included Robert E. Lee and Ulysses S. Grant.	
San Antonio Drug Company		432 W Market St	101255			
San Antonio Loan and Trust Building		235 E Commerce St.	101338			
San Antonio Municipal Auditorium		100 Auditorium Cir.	1179658			
Scottish Rite Cathedral		308 Avenue E	104214	5029004612		
Smith-Young Tower		310 S St. Marys St.	110964			
Staacke Brothers Building		309 E Commerce St.	101679 A	5029005085		
Stevens Building		315 E Commerce St.	8400614	5029005116		
Thiele House and Thiele Cottage		411 E 6th St.	104287	5029005461	Designed by architect J. Riely Gordon for German immigrant August Thiele.	
Toltec Apartments		131 Taylor	103954	5507017893		
Traveler's Hotel		220 Broadway	104152220			
Ursuline Academy		300 Augusta Street	102071	5029003828		

== See also ==
- National Register of Historic Places listings in Bexar County, Texas

== Additional sourcing ==
- Wolfe, Mark (2017). "San Antonio Downtown and River Walk Historic District" (PDF). United States Department of the Interior.
