= National Register of Historic Places listings in Bexar County, Texas =

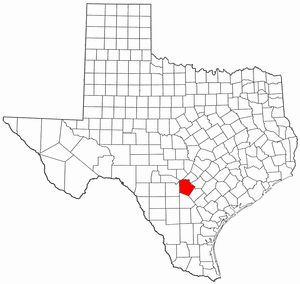
Location of Bexar County in Texas

This is a list of the National Register of Historic Places listings in Bexar County, Texas.

This is intended to be a complete list of properties and districts listed on the National Register of Historic Places in Bexar County, Texas. There are 27 districts, 142 individual properties, and one former property listed on the National Register in the county. Two districts and seven individually listed properties are National Historic Landmarks. One district is a National Historical Park, and one property is a National Historic Site. One property is a State Historic Site. Two districts and 15 individually listed properties are State Antiquities Landmarks while six districts contain several more. Two districts are Recorded Texas Historic Landmarks (RTHLs) while 33 individual properties are also designated RTHLs or contain one or more. Ten districts contain many more RTHLs.

This National Park Service list is complete through NPS recent listings posted May 1, 2026.

== Current listings ==
The publicly disclosed locations of National Register properties and districts may be seen in a mapping service provided.

	Name on the Register	Image	Date listed	Location	City or town	Description
1	Alamo Methodist Church	Alamo Methodist Church	June 11, 1979 (#79003446)	1150 S. Alamo St. 29°24′41″N 98°29′35″W	San Antonio	Part of South Alamo Street-South Mary's Street Historic District
2	Alamo National Bank Building	Alamo National Bank Building	January 5, 1984 (#84001574)	316 E. Commerce St. 29°25′26″N 98°29′21″W	San Antonio	Part of San Antonio Downtown and River Walk Historic District
3	Alamo National Bank Building	Alamo National Bank Building	May 10, 2006 (#06000364)	105 S. St. Mary's St. 29°25′27″N 98°29′30″W	San Antonio	Part of San Antonio Downtown and River Walk Historic District
4	Alamo Plaza Historic District	Alamo Plaza Historic District	July 13, 1977 (#77001425)	Roughly bounded by S. Broadway, Commerce, Bonham and Travis Sts. 29°25′31″N 98°29′08″W	San Antonio	Includes National Historic Landmarks, State Antiquities Landmarks, Recorded Texas Historic Landmarks
5	Alamo Portland and Roman Cement Works	Alamo Portland and Roman Cement Works	December 12, 1976 (#76002005)	Brackenridge Park; 29°27′38″N 98°28′36″W	San Antonio	State Antiquities Landmark; part of Brackenridge Park
6	The Alamo	The Alamo	October 15, 1966 (#66000808)	Alamo Plaza; 29°25′32″N 98°29′10″W	San Antonio	State Antiquities Landmark, Recorded Texas Historic Landmark; part of Alamo Plaza Historic District
7	Alamo Stadium and Gymnasium	Alamo Stadium and Gymnasium	September 8, 2011 (#11000651)	110 Tuleta Drive; 29°27′46″N 98°28′42″W	San Antonio	State Antiquities Landmark
8	Aue Stagecoach Inn	Aue Stagecoach Inn	August 1, 1979 (#79002912)	Boerne Stage Rd. and I-10; 29°39′55″N 98°37′43″W	Leon Springs	
9	Aurora Apartment Hotel	Aurora Apartment Hotel	July 14, 2021 (#100006722)	509 Howard St. 29°26′29″N 98°29′44″W	San Antonio	
10	Aztec Theater	Aztec Theater	October 22, 1992 (#92001403)	104 N. St. Mary's St. 29°25′28″N 98°29′27″W	San Antonio	Part of San Antonio Downtown and River Walk Historic District
11	Joseph, Jr. and Salome Ball Homestead	Joseph, Jr. and Salome Ball Homestead	July 23, 2018 (#100002696)	Address restricted	Lytle	Historic Farms and Ranches of Bexar County MPS
12	Barnes-Laird House	Barnes-Laird House	July 28, 1988 (#88001146)	103 W. Ashby Pl. 29°26′58″N 98°29′40″W	San Antonio	Part of Monte Vista Historic District
13	Barr Building	Barr Building	April 11, 1985 (#85000766)	213-219 Broadway; 29°25′41″N 98°29′15″W	San Antonio	Part of San Antonio Downtown and River Walk Historic District
14	Base Administration Building	Base Administration Building	August 27, 1987 (#87001434)	Randolph AFB; 29°32′09″N 98°16′57″W	Universal City	Part of Randolph Field Historic District
15	Charles V. Bellinger House and Greater Corinth Baptist Church and Community Center		September 24, 2025 (#100012298)	500-522 S. New Braunfels Ave. 29°24′51″N 98°27′40″W	San Antonio	
16	Bexar County Courthouse	Bexar County Courthouse	August 29, 1977 (#77001426)	Main Plaza; 29°25′23″N 98°29′36″W	San Antonio	State Antiquities Landmark, Recorded Texas Historic Landmark; part of Main and Military Plazas Historic District
17	Blue Star Street Industrial Historic District	Blue Star Street Industrial Historic District	June 24, 1994 (#94000627)	1432 S. Alamo St. 29°24′35″N 98°29′44″W	San Antonio	
18	Borden's Creamery		December 28, 2021 (#100007273)	875 East Ashby Pl. 29°26′49″N 98°28′57″W	San Antonio	
19	Buick Motor Company		October 16, 2025 (#100012349)	931 Broadway Street; 29°26′03″N 98°28′51″W	San Antonio	
20	James Butler Bonham Elementary School	James Butler Bonham Elementary School	November 17, 1978 (#78002890)	925 S. St. Mary's St. 29°24′50″N 98°29′20″W	San Antonio	Part of South Alamo Street-South Mary's Street Historic District
21	Brackenridge Park	Brackenridge Park	August 4, 2011 (#11000513)	Roughly bounded by Hildebrand Ave., Broadway & Ave. B, Josephine St., US 281, River Rd., Alpine Dr., N. St. Mary's St. 29°27′21″N 98°28′23″W	San Antonio	State Antiquities Landmark; includes additional State Antiquities Landmarks, Recorded Texas Historic Landmarks
22	Brady Building-Empire Theater	Brady Building-Empire Theater	March 17, 1999 (#99000283)	204 E. Houston St.-226 N. St. Mary's St. 29°25′34″N 98°29′28″W	San Antonio	Part of San Antonio Downtown and River Walk Historic District
23	Brooke Army Medical Center	Brooke Army Medical Center	November 30, 2001 (#01001281)	Building 1000, Stanley Rd., Fort Sam Houston; 29°27′58″N 98°26′57″W	San Antonio	
24	Buckeye Park Gate	Buckeye Park Gate	October 22, 2004 (#04001169)	1600 W. Wildwood; 29°28′45″N 98°31′17″W	San Antonio	Sculpture by Dionicio Rodriguez in Texas MPS
25	Builders Exchange Building	Builders Exchange Building	November 16, 1994 (#94001335)	152 Pecan St. 29°25′42″N 98°29′30″W	San Antonio	Part of San Antonio Downtown and River Walk Historic District
26	Bungalow Colony Historic District	Bungalow Colony Historic District	July 8, 2003 (#03000627)	Roughly bounded by General Hudnell Dr., General McMullen Dr. and Robins Dr. 29°22′48″N 98°33′39″W	San Antonio	
27	Burns Building	Burns Building	March 18, 1999 (#99000284)	401 E. Houston St. 29°25′35″N 98°29′18″W	San Antonio	Part of San Antonio Downtown and River Walk Historic District
28	Bushnell	Bushnell	August 26, 1982 (#82004491)	240 Bushnell; 29°27′44″N 98°29′16″W	San Antonio	Part of Monte Vista Residential Historic District
29	Calcasieu Building	Calcasieu Building	May 24, 1996 (#96000588)	202-214 Broadway; 29°25′40″N 98°29′14″W	San Antonio	Part of San Antonio Downtown and River Walk Historic District
30	George Washington Carver Library and Auditorium	George Washington Carver Library and Auditorium	November 15, 2003 (#03001162)	226 N. Hackberry St. 29°25′19″N 98°28′21″W	San Antonio	
31	Casa de Dios (House of God)		August 6, 2024 (#100010651)	910 E. Mistletoe Avenue; 29°27′12″N 98°29′01″W	San Antonio	
32	Central Trust Company Building	Central Trust Company Building	August 11, 1982 (#82004492)	603 Navarro St. 29°25′36″N 98°29′24″W	San Antonio	Part of San Antonio Downtown and River Walk Historic District
33	Chinese Sunken Garden Gate	Chinese Sunken Garden Gate	October 22, 2004 (#04001167)	Brackenridge Park, 4000 N. St. Mary's St. 29°27′45″N 98°28′38″W	San Antonio	Part of Brackenridge Park; Sculpture by Dionicio Rodriguez in Texas MPS
34	Church of Nuestra Senora de la Candelaria y Guadalupe	Church of Nuestra Senora de la Candelaria y Guadalupe	February 25, 1975 (#75001949)	115 Main Ave. 29°25′28″N 98°29′39″W	San Antonio	Recorded Texas Historic Landmark; part of Main and Military Plazas Historic District
35	City of San Antonio Municipal Auditorium	City of San Antonio Municipal Auditorium	September 14, 1981 (#81000624)	100 Auditorium Circle; 29°25′50″N 98°29′20″W	San Antonio	Part of San Antonio Downtown and River Walk Historic District
36	City Public Service Company Building	City Public Service Company Building	December 7, 1995 (#95001422)	201 N. St. Mary's St. 29°25′31″N 98°29′30″W	San Antonio	Part of San Antonio Downtown and River Walk Historic District
37	L. B. Clegg House	L. B. Clegg House	December 7, 1979 (#79002913)	123 W. Park Ave. 29°26′39″N 98°29′43″W	San Antonio	Recorded Texas Historic Landmark
38	Dionicio Rodriguez Bridge in Brackenridge Park	Dionicio Rodriguez Bridge in Brackenridge Park	October 22, 2004 (#04001166)	4000 N. St. Mary's St. 29°27′53″N 98°28′06″W	San Antonio	Part of Brackenridge Park; Sculpture by Dionicio Rodriguez in Texas MPS
39	Dubuis Hall		May 22, 2023 (#100009010)	4301 Broadway St. (University of the Incarnate Word); 29°28′04″N 98°27′53″W	San Antonio	
40	Emil Elmendorf House	Emil Elmendorf House	May 19, 1980 (#80004077)	509 Burleson St. 29°25′58″N 98°28′22″W	San Antonio	Recorded Texas Historic Landmark
41	Espada Aqueduct	Espada Aqueduct	October 15, 1966 (#66000809)	Espada Rd., E of U.S. 281S; 29°19′56″N 98°27′40″W	San Antonio	Recorded Texas Historic Landmarks; part of San Antonio Missions National Historical Park
42	The Fairmount Hotel	The Fairmount Hotel	June 30, 1988 (#88000753)	401 S. Alamo; 29°25′14″N 98°29′18″W	San Antonio	
43	Fence at Alamo Cement Company	Fence at Alamo Cement Company	August 9, 2005 (#05000861)	7300 Jones Maltsberger Rd. 29°29′51″N 98°28′44″W	San Antonio	Sculpture by Dionicio Rodriguez in Texas MPS
44	First National Bank of San Antonio	First National Bank of San Antonio	March 16, 1972 (#72001348)	239 E. Commerce St. 29°25′28″N 98°29′25″W	San Antonio	Recorded Texas Historic Landmark; part of San Antonio Downtown and River Walk Historic District
45	Floore Country Store	Floore Country Store	December 6, 2005 (#05001402)	14492 Old Bandera Rd. 29°34′40″N 98°41′26″W	Helotes	
46	Fort Sam Houston	Fort Sam Houston	May 15, 1975 (#75001950)	N edge of San Antonio; 29°26′52″N 98°27′52″W	San Antonio	Includes Recorded Texas Historic Landmark
47	Fort Sam Houston National Cemetery	Fort Sam Houston National Cemetery	March 8, 2016 (#16000065)	1520 Harry Wurzbach Road; 29°28′36″N 98°25′58″W	San Antonio	
48	Fountain at Alamo Cement Company	Fountain at Alamo Cement Company	August 9, 2005 (#05000862)	7300 Jones Maltsberger Rd. 29°29′51″N 98°28′45″W	San Antonio	Sculpture by Dionicio Rodriguez in Texas MPS
49	Fourth Ward School	Fourth Ward School	November 17, 1978 (#78002891)	141 Lavaca St. 29°25′02″N 98°29′12″W	San Antonio	Part of Lavaca Historic District
50	Thomas H. Franklin House	Thomas H. Franklin House	May 22, 1986 (#86001135)	105 E. French Pl. 29°27′02″N 98°29′37″W	San Antonio	Part of Monte Vista Historic District
51	Friedrich Complex	Friedrich Complex	September 26, 2002 (#02001059)	1617 E. Commerce St. 29°25′14″N 98°28′14″W	San Antonio	
52	Garcia-Garza House	Garcia-Garza House	July 7, 1983 (#83003091)	214 W. Salinas St. 29°25′41″N 98°29′42″W	San Antonio	Part of San Antonio Downtown and River Walk Historic District
53	Goad Motor Company Building	Goad Motor Company Building	December 8, 1997 (#97001530)	317 Lexington Ave. 29°26′00″N 98°29′25″W	San Antonio	
54	Robert B. Green Memorial Hospital	Robert B. Green Memorial Hospital	February 13, 2018 (#100002127)	903 W Martin St. 29°25′48″N 98°30′06″W	San Antonio	
55	Carl Hilmar Guenther House	Carl Hilmar Guenther House	October 11, 1990 (#90001539)	205 E. Guenther St. 29°24′41″N 98°29′45″W	San Antonio	Part of the King William Historic District
56	Gunter Hotel	Gunter Hotel	January 9, 2007 (#06001233)	205 E. Houston St. 29°25′36″N 98°29′28″W	San Antonio	Part of San Antonio Downtown and River Walk Historic District
57	A. H. Halff House	A. H. Halff House	September 4, 1986 (#86002180)	601 Howard St. 29°26′31″N 98°29′45″W	San Antonio	Recorded Texas Historic Landmark
58	Hangar 9	Hangar 9	May 21, 1970 (#70000895)	Brooks Air Force Base Inner Circle Rd. 29°20′38″N 98°26′39″W	San Antonio	Recorded Texas Historic Landmark
59	Ethel Wilson Harris House	Ethel Wilson Harris House	April 3, 2001 (#01000325)	6519 San Jose Dr.-San Antonio Missions NHP; 29°21′48″N 98°28′50″W	San Antonio	Part of San Jose Mission National Historic Site, San Antonio Missions National Historical Park
60	John S. Harrison House	John S. Harrison House	June 29, 2006 (#06000551)	14997 Evans Rd. 29°34′32″N 98°18′19″W	Selma	State Antiquities Landmark
61	The Havana	The Havana	April 10, 1986 (#86000725)	1015 Navarro St. 29°25′51″N 98°29′23″W	San Antonio	Part of San Antonio Downtown and River Walk Historic District
62	Hays Street Bridge	Hays Street Bridge	September 10, 2012 (#12000787)	Hays St. over UPRR, N. Cherry, & Chestnut Sts. 29°25′49″N 98°28′40″W	San Antonio	Historic Bridges of Texas, 1866-1945 MPS
63	Heermann Store	Heermann Store	January 20, 2023 (#100008551)	4738 West Loop 1604; 29°13′54″N 98°35′51″W	Von Ormy	
64	Heidemann Ranch		July 6, 2011 (#11000423)	26090 Toutant Beauregard Rd. 29°41′18″N 98°42′13″W	San Antonio	Historic Farms and Ranches of Bexar County MPS
65	Johann and Anna Heidgen House	Johann and Anna Heidgen House	June 9, 2004 (#04000591)	121 Starr St. 29°25′34″N 98°28′56″W	San Antonio	Recorded Texas Historic Landmark
66	Heimann Building	Heimann Building	January 27, 2005 (#04001396)	118 N. Medina St. 29°25′37″N 98°30′17″W	San Antonio	
67	Herrera Ranch		September 9, 2010 (#10000737)	Old Somerset Rd. at Medina River; 29°16′59″N 98°36′51″W	Von Ormy	Historic Farms and Ranches of Bexar County MPS
68	Huebner-Onion Homestead and Stagecoach Stop	Huebner-Onion Homestead and Stagecoach Stop	August 10, 2005 (#05000860)	6613 Bandera Rd. 29°29′39″N 98°37′00″W	Leon Valley	
69	Hugo & Schmeltzer Company Warehouse		January 25, 2024 (#100009887)	1226 E. Houston Street; 29°25′30″N 98°28′41″W	San Antonio	
70	Institute of Texan Cultures	Institute of Texan Cultures	April 18, 2024 (#100010249)	801 E. Cesar Chavez; 29°24′57″N 98°28′57″W	San Antonio	
71	International & Great Northern Railroad Passenger Station	International & Great Northern Railroad Passenger Station	September 9, 1975 (#75001951)	Medina and Houston Sts. 29°25′37″N 98°30′19″W	San Antonio	
72	Jacala Restaurant	Jacala Restaurant	October 22, 2004 (#04001168)	2702 N. St. Mary's St. 29°27′01″N 98°29′13″W	San Antonio	Sculpture by Dionicio Rodriguez in Texas MPS
73	Kelly Field Historic District	Kelly Field Historic District	July 10, 2003 (#03000626)	Roughly encompassing the 1600 and 1700 Areas of Kelly AFB; 29°22′57″N 98°34′15″W	San Antonio	
74	King William Historic District	King William Historic District	January 20, 1972 (#72001349)	Roughly bounded by Durango, Alamo, Guenther Sts. and the San Antonio River; 29°24′51″N 98°29′34″W	San Antonio	Includes Recorded Texas Historic Landmarks
75	Otto and Emma Koehler House		May 8, 2026 (#100012979)	310 West Ashby Place; 29°26′57″N 98°29′49″W	San Antonio	
76	Krause House	Krause House	July 19, 2010 (#10000469)	8551 Old Pearsall Road; 29°18′20″N 98°39′56″W	San Antonio	Recorded Texas Historic Landmark; Historic Farms and Ranches of Bexar County MPS
77	La Villita Historic District	La Villita Historic District	January 20, 1972 (#72001350)	Bounded by Durango, Navarro, Alamo Sts. and San Antonio River; 29°25′17″N 98°29′20″W	San Antonio	Includes State Antiquities Landmarks, Recorded Texas Historic Landmarks
78	Lavaca Historic District	Lavaca Historic District	July 5, 2000 (#00000773)	Roughly bounded by S. Alamo St., S. Presa St., alley bet. Camargo St., Callahan Ave., Labor St., and Garfield Alley; 29°24′47″N 98°29′14″W	San Antonio	
79	Robert E. Lee Hotel	Robert E. Lee Hotel	February 16, 1996 (#96000063)	111 Travis St. 29°25′39″N 98°29′39″W	San Antonio	Part of San Antonio Downtown and River Walk Historic District
80	Lerma's Nite Club	Lerma's Nite Club	March 21, 2011 (#11000135)	1602-1612 N Zarzamora; 29°26′40″N 98°31′29″W	San Antonio	
81	Light House	Light House	March 21, 2011 (#11000131)	300 Argyle Ave; 29°28′32″N 98°28′10″W	Alamo Heights	
82	Live Oak Park Site	Live Oak Park Site	December 15, 1978 (#78002889)	Address restricted	Live Oak	Smithsonian trinomial: 41BX435
83	Livingston-Hess House	Livingston-Hess House	February 16, 1996 (#96000036)	228 W. Huisache Ave. 29°27′21″N 98°29′46″W	San Antonio	Part of Monte Vista Residential Historic District
84	Main and Military Plazas Historic District	Main and Military Plazas Historic District	June 11, 1979 (#79002914)	Roughly bounded by San Antonio River, E. Nueva, Laredo, and Houston Sts. 29°25′27″N 98°29′37″W	San Antonio	Includes National Historic Landmark, State Antiquities Landmarks, Recorded Texas Historic Landmarks; boundary increased October 7, 2019.
85	Majestic Theatre	Majestic Theatre	October 1, 1975 (#75001952)	230 E. Houston St. 29°25′35″N 98°29′26″W	San Antonio	Recorded Texas Historic Landmark; part of San Antonio Downtown and River Walk Historic District
86	Maverick Building	Maverick Building	January 24, 1995 (#94001593)	606 N. Presa; 29°25′35″N 98°29′18″W	San Antonio	Part of San Antonio Downtown and River Walk Historic District
87	Maverick-Altgelt Ranch and Fenstermaker-Fromme Farm	Maverick-Altgelt Ranch and Fenstermaker-Fromme Farm	April 12, 1979 (#79002915)	Address restricted	San Antonio	Smithsonian trinomials: 41BX493, 41BX494, 41BX495, 41BX496, 41BX497, 41BX498
88	Maverick-Carter House	Maverick-Carter House	July 21, 1998 (#98000844)	119 Taylor St. 29°25′48″N 98°29′16″W	San Antonio	Recorded Texas Historic Landmark; part of San Antonio Downtown and River Walk Historic District
89	Otto Meerscheidt House	Otto Meerscheidt House	July 4, 1980 (#80004488)	332 Adams St. 29°24′30″N 98°29′25″W	San Antonio	Part of South Alamo Street-South Mary's Street Historic District
90	Menger Soap Works	Menger Soap Works	December 12, 1973 (#73001958)	400 block of N. Laredo St. 29°25′45″N 98°29′48″W	San Antonio	Recorded Texas Historic Landmark
91	Merchants Ice and Cold Storage Company	Merchants Ice and Cold Storage Company	September 26, 2002 (#02001060)	1305 E. Houston St. 29°25′31″N 98°28′38″W	San Antonio	
92	Meyer Pottery Archeological Complex		March 9, 1990 (#90000299)	Address restricted	Atascosa	Smithsonian trinomial; 41BX128, also known as Black Hill Pottery
93	Milam Building	Milam Building	May 18, 2014 (#15000246)	115 East Travis Street; 29°25′40″N 98°29′35″W	San Antonio	Part of San Antonio Downtown and River Walk Historic District
94	Ben Milam Statue	Ben Milam Statue	August 27, 2020 (#100005535)	500 West Houston St. (Milam Park); 29°25′34″N 98°29′57″W	San Antonio	
95	Miraflores Park	Miraflores Park	June 14, 2006 (#04001176)	800 Hildebrand; 29°27′55″N 98°28′03″W	San Antonio	State Antiquities Landmark; part of Brackenridge Park; Sculpture by Dionicio Rodriguez in Texas MPS
96	Mission Concepcion	Mission Concepcion	April 15, 1970 (#70000740)	807 Mission Rd. 29°23′27″N 98°29′28″W	San Antonio	State Antiquities Landmark, Recorded Texas Historic Landmark; part of San Antonio Missions National Historical Park
97	Mission Parkway	Mission Parkway	October 6, 1975 (#75001953)	Along San Antonio River; 29°21′06″N 98°28′11″W	San Antonio	Part of San Antonio Missions National Historical Park; includes State Antiquities Landmark
98	Mission San Francisco de la Espada	Mission San Francisco de la Espada	February 23, 1972 (#72001351); January 28, 1974 boundary increase (#74002324)	Espada Rd. 29°19′03″N 98°27′00″W	San Antonio	State Antiquities Landmark; part of San Antonio Missions National Historical Park
99	Mission San Juan Capistrano	Mission San Juan Capistrano	February 23, 1972 (#72001352)	Mission Rd. 29°19′55″N 98°27′16″W	San Antonio	State Antiquities Landmark, Recorded Texas Historic Landmark; part of San Antonio Missions National Historical Park
100	Billy Mitchell Village		December 29, 2022 (#100008496)	201-245 Croyden Ave., 201-435 Cropsey Ave., 101-160 Camelot Ct., 102-132 General Ent Ct. 29°23′09″N 98°33′28″W	San Antonio	
101	Monastery of Our Lady of Charity	Monastery of Our Lady of Charity	June 25, 1999 (#99000719)	1900 Montana; 29°25′05″N 98°26′56″W	San Antonio	
102	Monkey House/Commissary (San Antonio Zoo)		April 3, 2024 (#100010141)	3903 North St. Mary's Street; 29°27′45″N 98°28′24″W	San Antonio	
103	Monte Vista Residential Historic District	Monte Vista Residential Historic District	December 10, 1998 (#98001421)	Roughly bounded by Hildebrand, Stadium, N. St. Mary's, Asby, and San Pedro Sts. 29°27′27″N 98°29′26″W	San Antonio	Includes Recorded Texas Historic Landmarks
104	William J. Morrison, Jr. House	William J. Morrison, Jr. House	July 12, 1990 (#90001078)	710 N. Olive St. 29°25′41″N 98°28′16″W	San Antonio	
105	Jose Antonio Navarro Elementary School	Jose Antonio Navarro Elementary School	November 29, 1978 (#78002892)	623 S. Pecos St. 29°25′11″N 98°30′08″W	San Antonio	State Antiquities Landmark
106	Jose Antonio Navarro House Complex	Jose Antonio Navarro House Complex	March 24, 1972 (#72001353); December 23, 2016 NHL designation (#100000830)	228-232 S. Laredo St. 29°25′23″N 98°29′51″W	San Antonio	State Historic Site, State Antiquities Landmark, Recorded Texas Historic Landmark
107	Old Lone Star Brewery	Old Lone Star Brewery	October 26, 1972 (#72001354); September 25, 1979 boundary increase (#79003544)	200 West Jones Ave. 29°26′13″N 98°28′53″W	San Antonio	
108	Our Lady of Mount Carmel and St. Therese Church	Our Lady of Mount Carmel and St. Therese Church	July 9, 1998 (#98000843)	906 Kentucky; 29°26′45″N 98°31′30″W	San Antonio	
109	Hiram Partee House	Hiram Partee House	September 20, 1984 (#84001576)	605 Belknap Pl. 29°27′08″N 98°29′52″W	San Antonio	Part of Monte Vista Residential Historic District
110	Perez Rancho Site and Delores Crossing		November 26, 2014 (#14000099)	Address restricted	San Antonio	Historic Resources of El Camino Real de los Tejas National Historic Trail MPS; Lt. Col. Ygnacio Perez Stone Rancho Site, Smithsonian trinomial: 41BX274
111	Pershing House	Pershing House	July 30, 1974 (#74002058)	Staff Post Rd., Fort Sam Houston; 29°26′42″N 98°28′09″W	San Antonio	Part of Fort Sam Houston
112	Plehwe Complex	Plehwe Complex	December 15, 1983 (#83003755)	W of Leon Springs on Boerne Stage Rd. 29°39′53″N 98°38′20″W	Leon Springs	
113	Poe Motor Company	Poe Motor Company	November 5, 2018 (#100003073)	900 Broadway St. 29°26′00″N 98°28′53″W	San Antonio	
114	Post Chapel, Fort Sam Houston	Post Chapel, Fort Sam Houston	May 17, 1974 (#74002057)	Bldg. 2200, Wilson St. 29°26′54″N 98°27′31″W	San Antonio	Part of Fort Sam Houston
115	Presnall-Watson Homestead	Presnall-Watson Homestead	April 10, 2012 (#12000192)	Address restricted	San Antonio	Historic Farms and Ranches of Bexar County MPS
116	Prospect Hill Missionary Baptist Church	Prospect Hill Missionary Baptist Church	September 18, 1986 (#86002185)	1601 Buena Vista; 29°25′35″N 98°30′57″W	San Antonio	
117	The Quadrangle	The Quadrangle	July 30, 1974 (#74002059)	Grayson St., Fort Sam Houston; 29°26′40″N 98°27′44″W	San Antonio	Recorded Texas Historic Landmark; part of Fort Sam Houston
118	Randolph Field Historic District	Randolph Field Historic District	July 8, 1996 (#96000753)	Randolph Air Force Base, off Pat Booker Rd., 18 NE of San Antonio; 29°31′56″N 98°16′48″W	Universal City	Randolph Air Force Base MPS
119	Reinbolt Hall at St. Mary's University	Reinbolt Hall at St. Mary's University	February 21, 2017 (#100000668)	1 Camino Santa Maria; 29°27′10″N 98°33′42″W	San Antonio	
120	Sacred Heart Conventual Chapel	Sacred Heart Conventual Chapel	July 26, 2021 (#100006774)	411 SW 24th St. 29°25′32″N 98°32′39″W	San Antonio	
121	Saint Anthony Hotel	Saint Anthony Hotel	September 19, 1986 (#86002186)	300 Travis St. 29°25′38″N 98°29′19″W	San Antonio	Part of San Antonio Downtown and River Walk Historic District
122	St. John's Seminary	St. John's Seminary	May 23, 2018 (#100002470)	222 E Mitchell St. 29°23′29″N 98°29′27″W	San Antonio	
123	St. Louis Hall at St. Mary's University	St. Louis Hall at St. Mary's University	March 24, 2008 (#08000239)	1 Camino Santa Maria; 29°27′10″N 98°33′40″W	San Antonio	
124	St. Mark's Episcopal Church	St. Mark's Episcopal Church	February 12, 1998 (#98000103)	315 E. Pecan St. 29°25′43″N 98°29′19″W	San Antonio	Recorded Texas Historic Landmark; part of San Antonio Downtown and River Walk Historic District
125	Salado Battlefield and Archeological Site	Salado Battlefield and Archeological Site	November 21, 1978 (#78002893)	Address restricted	San Antonio	
126	San Antonio Casino Club Building	San Antonio Casino Club Building	January 8, 1980 (#80004078)	102 W. Crockett St. 29°25′30″N 98°29′19″W	San Antonio	Recorded Texas Historic Landmark; part of San Antonio Downtown and River Walk Historic District
127	Old San Antonio City Cemeteries Historic District	Old San Antonio City Cemeteries Historic District	October 11, 2000 (#00000772)	Roughly bounded by Nevada, New Braunfels, Paso Hondo, Palmetto, Potomac, St. James, Pine, E. Commerce, Dakota, Monumenta; 29°25′08″N 98°27′52″W	San Antonio	
128	San Antonio Downtown and River Walk Historic District	San Antonio Downtown and River Walk Historic District	February 23, 2018 (#100002128)	Roughly bounded by Camaron, Augusta, 6th, Bonham, Losoya, & Tolie Place; also 606-620 Broadway (East of 600 Block); 29°25′29″N 98°29′33″W	San Antonio	Includes Recorded Texas Historic Landmarks; second set of addresses represent a boundary increase approved October 30, 2025.
129	San Antonio Drug Company	San Antonio Drug Company	May 19, 1994 (#94000453)	432 W. Market St. 29°25′25″N 98°29′29″W	San Antonio	Part of San Antonio Downtown and River Walk Historic District
130	San Antonio Loan and Trust Building	San Antonio Loan and Trust Building	July 12, 1976 (#76002006)	235 E. Commerce St. 29°25′25″N 98°29′26″W	San Antonio	Part of San Antonio Downtown and River Walk Historic District
131	San Antonio Missions National Historical Park	San Antonio Missions National Historical Park	November 10, 1978 (#78003147)	Mission and Espada Rds. and San Jose Dr. 29°21′42″N 98°28′49″W	San Antonio	Includes National Historic Site, State Antiquities Landmarks, Recorded Texas Historic Landmarks
132	San Antonio National Cemetery	San Antonio National Cemetery	November 22, 1999 (#99001395)	517 Paso Hondo St. 29°25′20″N 98°28′05″W	San Antonio	Part of Old San Antonio City Cemeteries Historic District; Civil War Era National Cemeteries MPS
133	San Antonio US Post Office and Courthouse	San Antonio US Post Office and Courthouse	September 29, 2000 (#00001174)	615 E. Houston St. 29°25′37″N 98°29′11″W	San Antonio	Part of Alamo Plaza Historic District
134	San Antonio Water Works Pump Station No. 2	San Antonio Water Works Pump Station No. 2	August 21, 1981 (#81000625)	Brackenridge Park; 29°26′55″N 98°28′37″W	San Antonio	Part of Brackenridge Park
135	San Jose Mission National Historic Site	San Jose Mission National Historic Site	October 15, 1966 (#66000810)	6519 San Jose Dr. 29°21′44″N 98°28′47″W	San Antonio	State Antiquities Landmark, Recorded Texas Historic Landmark; part of San Antonio Missions National Historical Park
136	San Pedro Springs Park	San Pedro Springs Park	November 1, 1979 (#79002916)	San Pedro Ave. 29°26′48″N 98°30′05″W	San Antonio	State Antiquities Landmark
137	Schroeder-Yturri House	Schroeder-Yturri House	April 14, 1975 (#75001954)	1040 E. Commerce St. 29°25′20″N 98°28′54″W	San Antonio	State Antiquities Landmark
138	Scottish Rite Cathedral	Scottish Rite Cathedral	February 16, 1996 (#96000068)	308 Ave. E 29°25′39″N 98°29′03″W	San Antonio	Recorded Texas Historic Landmark; part of San Antonio Downtown and River Walk Historic District
139	Selma Stagecoach Stop and Post Office	Selma Stagecoach Stop and Post Office	June 26, 2017 (#100001252)	9374 Valhalla; 29°34′57″N 98°18′20″W	Selma	
140	Smith-Young Tower	Smith-Young Tower	November 13, 1991 (#91001682)	310 S. St. Mary's St. 29°25′22″N 98°29′29″W	San Antonio	Part of San Antonio Downtown and River Walk Historic District
141	Source of the River District	Source of the River District	July 31, 1978 (#78002894)	Address restricted	San Antonio	
142	South Alamo Street-South Mary's Street Historic District	South Alamo Street-South Mary's Street Historic District	October 4, 1984 (#84000026)	Bounded by the San Antonio River, S. Alamo, S. St. Mary's, and Temple Sts. 29°24′29″N 98°29′25″W	San Antonio	Includes Recorded Texas Historic Landmarks
143	Southern Pacific Depot Historic District	Southern Pacific Depot Historic District	February 1, 1979 (#79002917)	Roughly bounded by Crockett, Chestnut, Galveston, and Cherry Sts. 29°25′16″N 98°28′40″W	San Antonio	Includes State Antiquities Landmark
144	Southern Pacific Railroad Passenger Station	Southern Pacific Railroad Passenger Station	May 29, 1975 (#75001955)	1174 E. Commerce St. 29°25′12″N 98°28′40″W	San Antonio	State Antiquities Landmark; part of Southern Pacific Depot Historic District
145	Spanish Governor's Palace	Spanish Governor's Palace	April 15, 1970 (#70000741)	105 Military Plaza; 29°25′30″N 98°29′45″W	San Antonio	State Antiquities Landmark, Recorded Texas Historic Landmark; part of Main and Military Plazas Historic District
146	Specht's Store and Schmidt's Gin	Specht's Store and Schmidt's Gin	July 29, 2020 (#100005384)	106 Specht Rd. 29°44′14″N 98°29′51″W	Bulverde vicinity	
147	Staacke Brothers Building	Staacke Brothers Building	September 2, 1980 (#80004079)	309 E. Commerce St. 29°25′28″N 98°29′22″W	San Antonio	Recorded Texas Historic Landmark; part of San Antonio Downtown and River Walk Historic District
148	State Highway 3-A Bridge at Cibolo Creek	State Highway 3-A Bridge at Cibolo Creek	October 10, 1996 (#96001112)	I-10 at the Bexar and Guadalupe Cnty. line 29°30′05″N 98°11′11″W	Schertz	Historic Bridges of Texas, 1866-1945 MPS; extends into Guadalupe County
149	Stations of the Cross and Grotto at the Shrine of St. Anthony de Padua	Stations of the Cross and Grotto at the Shrine of St. Anthony de Padua	December 23, 2004 (#04001170)	100 Peter Baque Rd. 29°30′04″N 98°28′14″W	San Antonio	Sculpture by Dionicio Rodriguez in Texas MPS
150	Stevens Building	Stevens Building	May 10, 1984 (#84001614)	315 E. Commerce St. 29°25′27″N 98°29′21″W	San Antonio	Recorded Texas Historic Landmark; part of San Antonio Downtown and River Walk Historic District
151	Thiele House and Thiele Cottage	Thiele House and Thiele Cottage	March 3, 1983 (#83003092)	411 and 415 Sixth St. 29°25′47″N 98°28′59″W	San Antonio	Recorded Texas Historic Landmarks; part of San Antonio Downtown and River Walk Historic District
152	Thomas Jefferson High School	Thomas Jefferson High School	September 22, 1983 (#83003093)	723 Donaldson Ave. 29°27′54″N 98°32′15″W	San Antonio	Recorded Texas Historic Landmark
153	The Toltec	The Toltec	July 26, 2010 (#10000498)	131 Taylor Ave. 29°25′49″N 98°29′16″W	San Antonio	Recorded Texas Historic Landmarks; part of San Antonio Downtown and River Walk Historic District
154	Travelers Hotel	Travelers Hotel	September 18, 2015 (#15000617)	220 Broadway; 29°25′42″N 98°29′14″W	San Antonio	Part of San Antonio Downtown and River Walk Historic District
155	Trinity University Historic District	Trinity University Historic District	May 29, 2018 (#100002471)	Roughly bounded by E. Hildebrand, E Mulberry, & Bushnell Aves., Stadium Dr., Kings Ct., Ledge, Shook, & Campus Lns. 29°27′48″N 98°28′58″W	San Antonio	
156	Trolley Stop in Alamo Heights	Trolley Stop in Alamo Heights	October 22, 2004 (#04001165)	4900 blk of Broadway; 29°28′17″N 98°27′48″W	Alamo Heights	Sculpture by Dionicio Rodriguez in Texas MPS
157	U.S. San Antonio Arsenal	U.S. San Antonio Arsenal	December 30, 1969 (#69000200)	Roughly bounded by S. Flores and E. Arsenal Sts., and the San Antonio River; 29°24′28″N 98°29′44″W	San Antonio	Recorded Texas Historic Landmark
158	Gustav Uhl House and Store	Gustav Uhl House and Store	September 26, 2002 (#02001061)	721 Avenue E 29°25′52″N 98°28′52″W	San Antonio	
159	University of the Incarnate Word Administration Building	University of the Incarnate Word Administration Building	May 17, 2010 (#10000267)	4301 Broadway; 29°28′01″N 98°27′54″W	San Antonio	
160	Ursuline Academy	Ursuline Academy	November 25, 1969 (#69000201)	300 Augusta St. 29°25′52″N 98°29′32″W	San Antonio	Recorded Texas Historic Landmark; part of San Antonio Downtown and River Walk Historic District
161	Voelcker Farmstead Historic District		July 11, 2014 (#14000402)	13203 Blanco Rd. 29°33′49″N 98°31′37″W	San Antonio	Historic Farms and Ranches of Bexar County MPS; the site of the Phil Hardberger Park as of 2018.
162	Vogel Belt Complex	Vogel Belt Complex	April 10, 1975 (#75001956)	111-121 Military Plaza; 29°25′28″N 98°29′45″W	San Antonio	Recorded Texas Historic Landmark; part of Main and Military Plazas Historic District
163	Walker Ranch	Walker Ranch	February 24, 1975 (#75001957)	Address restricted	San Antonio	
164	The Wedgwood	The Wedgwood	February 21, 2017 (#100000669)	6701 Blanco Rd. 29°31′04″N 98°30′29″W	San Antonio	
165	R.L. White Ranch		February 24, 1975 (#08000474)	18744 Bandera Rd. E. 29°37′04″N 98°45′02″W	Helotes	Recorded Texas Historic Landmark
166	David J. and May Bock Woodward House	David J. and May Bock Woodward House	February 16, 1996 (#96000069)	1717 San Pedro Ave. 29°27′01″N 98°29′59″W	San Antonio	Recorded Texas Historic Landmark
167	L. T. Wright House	L. T. Wright House	April 1, 1983 (#83003094)	342 Wilkens Ave. 29°23′42″N 98°29′08″W	San Antonio	
168	Ximenes Chapel	Ximenes Chapel	September 8, 1980 (#80004080)	113 Ruiz St. 29°26′03″N 98°30′13″W	San Antonio	
169	Yturri-Edmunds House	Yturri-Edmunds House	August 8, 1996 (#96000870)	257 Yellowstone St. 29°23′53″N 98°29′15″W	San Antonio	Recorded Texas Historic Landmark

== Former listings ==
	Name on the Register	Image	Date listed	Date removed	Location	City or town	Description
1	Daniel J. Sullivan Stable and Carriage House		February 23, 1978 (#78002895)	March 18, 1988	314 Fourth St. 29°25′47″N 98°29′08″W	San Antonio	Delisted after relocation to the San Antonio Botanical Garden 29°27′32″N 98°27′31″W

== See also ==
- National Register of Historic Places listings in Texas
- Recorded Texas Historic Landmarks in Bexar County
- San Antonio Downtown and River Walk Historic District
