= Jeremiah Dashiell House =

Historic house in Texas, United States

- U.S. Historic district – Contributing property
- Recorded Texas Historic Landmark
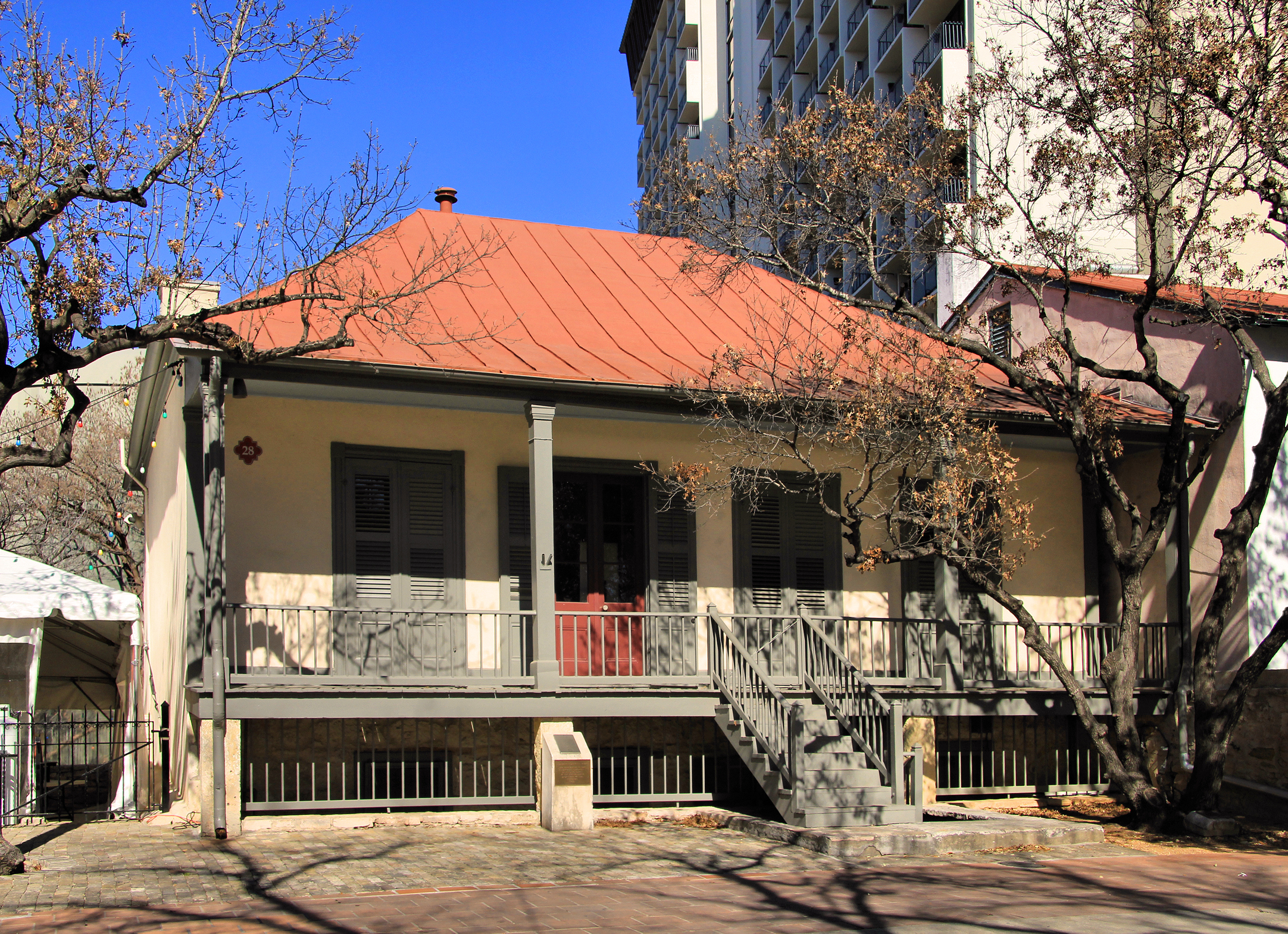
- Dashiell House in 2014

- Location within Texas Location within the United States
- Location: 511 Villita St., San Antonio, Texas
- Coordinates: 29°25′32″N 98°29′26″W
- Built: c. 1840
- Part of: La Villita Historic District (ID72001350); San Antonio Downtown and River Walk Historic District (ID100002128)
- RTHL No.: 13340

Significant dates
- Designated CP: January 20, 1972, February 23, 2018
- Designated RTHL: 1962

The Jeremiah Dashiell House is located in the Bexar County city of San Antonio in the U.S. state of Texas. Also known as Casa Villita, it was designated a Recorded Texas Historic Landmark under that name in 1962. It is listed on the National Register of Historic Places listings in Bexar County, Texas as a contributing structure of the La Villita Historic District.

== House details ==
This two-story limestone house fronts the San Antonio River Walk and was built c1850 by contractor J.H. Kampmann. The San Antonio Conservation Society (SACS) acquired the property in 1942 and did a restoration. Between 1953 and 1974, SACS used it as their headquarters.

Eventually, SACS moved their headquarters to the Anton Wulff House, and used the Dashiell house as the operational office for A Night in Old San Antonio. When the National Park Service designated La Villita as a national historic district in 1972, the Dashiell house was listed as a contributing property.

== Jeremiah Yellot Dashiell ==
Jeremiah Yellott Dashiell (1804–1888) was one of nine physicians who help found Louisville Medical College. Born and educated in Baltimore, Maryland, his earliest practice was in Louisville, Kentucky. His position as a political appointee under President James K. Polk brought him to San Antonio in 1849. He purchased property in the city and had Casa Villita built for himself. During the Civil War he enlisted in the Confederate States Army and served under former Texas Governor Francis R. Lubbock. When the war ended, Dashiell became a newspaper editor in San Antonio.

== See also ==
- National Register of Historic Places listings in Bexar County, Texas
- Recorded Texas Historic Landmarks in Bexar County
