= Yturri–Edmunds Historic Site =

Historic house in Texas, United States

- U.S. National Register of Historic Places
- Recorded Texas Historic Landmark
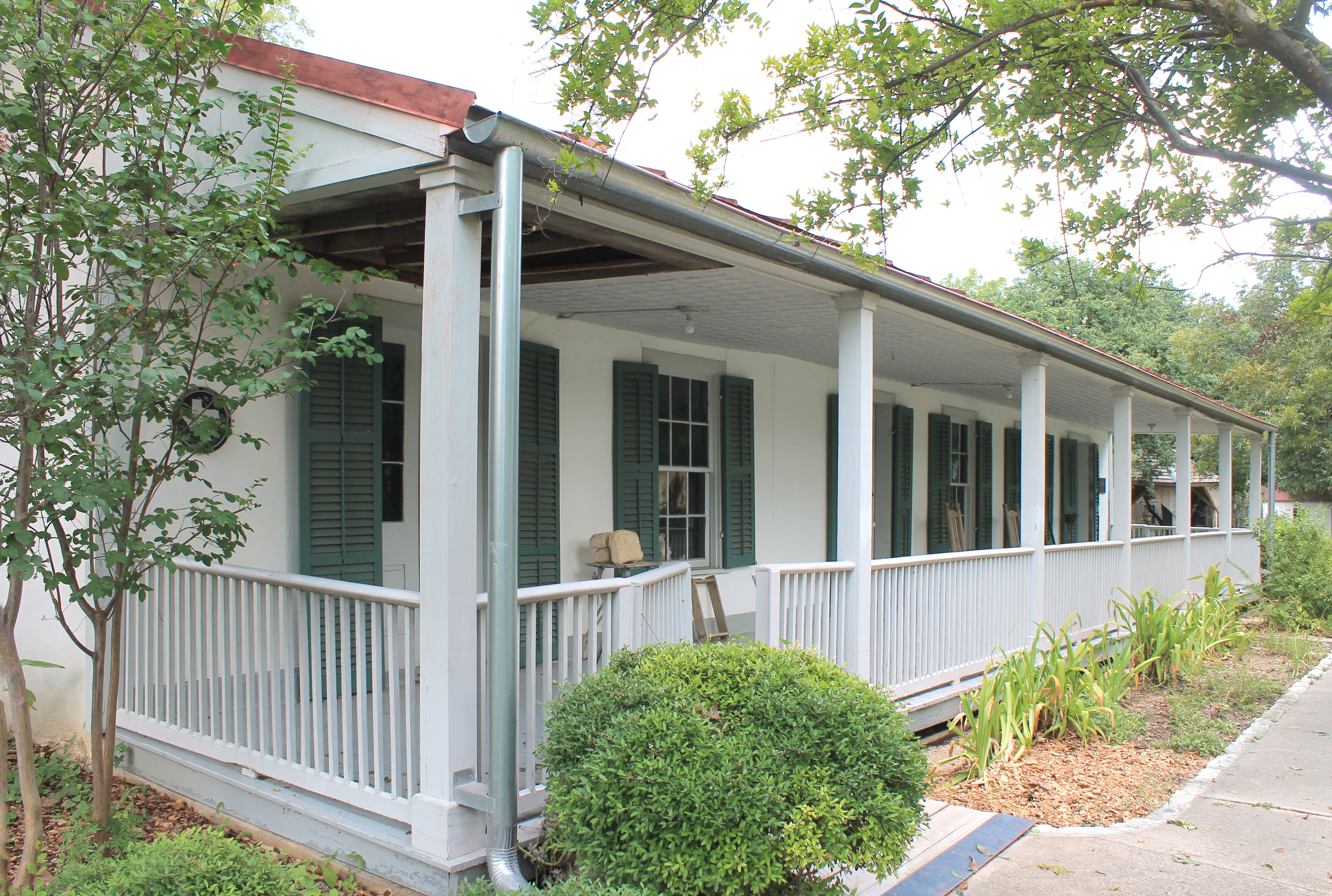
- Yturri–Edmunds House

- Location within Texas Location within the United States
- Interactive map showing the location of Yturri-Edmunds House
- Location: 128 Mission Road (Yellostone at Mission); Bexar County, Texas
- Coordinates: 29°23′53″N 98°29′15″W
- NRHP reference No.: 96000870
- RTHL No.: 5932

Significant dates
- Added to NRHP: August 8, 1996
- Designated RTHL: 1966

The Yturri–Edmunds Historic Site is a historic site in San Antonio, Texas. The house is listed on the National Register of Historic Places listings in Bexar County, Texas. The homestead and mill were designated a Recorded Texas Historic Landmark in 1966.

== History ==
In the early 19th century during the era of Mexico's General Colonization Law, Manuel Yturri de Castillo was given a land grant on property once owned by Mission Concepcion. He was thought to have been born in Spain, but immigrated to Mexico. There, he was employed by Spanish merchants who transferred him to San Antonio. In 1821, he married Maria Josefa Rodriguez, whose family were among the first Canary Islanders to arrive in the area in 1731. Upon his death, his property passed to his heirs. His granddaughter Ernestine Edmunds bequeathed the property in the historic site to the San Antonio Conservation Society (SACS), which took possession of it in 1961.

== Historic site ==
The adobe-block house, which is thought to have been built by Yturri de Castillo 1840–1860, was listed on the National Register of Historic Places listings in Bexar County, Texas, in 1996. SACS began major restoration in 1964, which included repairs, rebuilding of the porch area, re-plastering, and complete interior restoration.

Also on the site is an operational grist mill thought to have existed when Yturri de Castillo bought the property. Former Pioneer Flour Mills executive Ernst Schuchard and architect Marvin Eickenroht oversaw the complete restoration of the mill in 1964. An 1881 two-story carriage house originally on the Oge property was purchased by SACS in 1964, restored and moved to the Yturri–Edmunds site. A caliche and stone home built by Cristof Postert on South Flores was donated to SACS in 1984 and also moved to the Yturri–Edmunds site.

The site is operated as a museum by SACS, on a by-appointment basis, and admission fees apply. With a 2-week notice, visitors are able to see the mill in operation.
