= Kelly Field Historic District =

Historic district in Texas, United States

- U.S. National Register of Historic Places
- U.S. Historic district
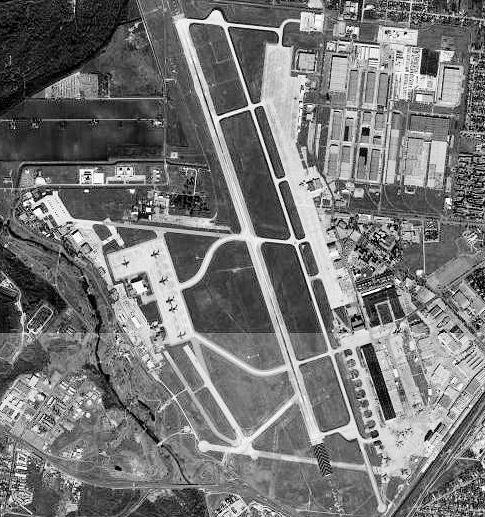
- Kelly Field Historic District, middle right of the runway

- Location within Texas Location within the United States
- Location: San Antonio, Texas, US
- Coordinates: 29°22′57″N 98°34′15″W
- NRHP reference No.: 03000626
- Added to NRHP: July 10, 2003

The Kelly Field Historic District is located in southwestern San Antonio, Bexar County, Texas. It is the center portion of the base, east of the runways. The boundaries of the 1600 buildings are Billy Mitchell Road on the north, Wagner on the east, England on the south and S. Frank Luke Drive on the west. The 1700 block of officer quarters are bounded on the north by Chennault Street, the east and south by Chennault Circle, and Van Nostrand Drive on the west. The historic district contains 58 contributing and non-contributing buildings, structures, objects and sites, and was added to the National Register of Historic Places in 2003.

Camp Kelly was established on May 7, 1917, to be a US Army training facility for pilots and support staff during World War I. The first airplanes arrived on April 5, and on April 6 the United States declared war on Germany. The increased training activities necessitated more facilities and the acquisition of additional land. The original field became Kelly Field No. 1. The new facilities became Kelly Field No. 2. Military cut-backs followed the 1918 Armistice with Germany, and the two facilities ceased training pilots but functioned as supply depots. The two fields were re-designated in 1925 as Duncan Field (Kelly No. 1) and Kelly Field (Kelly No. 2). The latter included the Air Service Advanced Flying School where Charles Lindbergh earned his wings, graduating first in his class on March 14, 1925.

In 1926, the Army Air Corps Act authorized a 5-year period of expansion to begin July 1, 1927. As a result, both Kelly No. 1 and No. 2 began being developed as permanent aviator training facilities. During World War II, the facilities were consolidated as San Antonio Air Depot and was the largest maintenance and supply facility in the United States. The property was renamed Kelly Air Force Base after the National Security Act of 1947 established the United States Air Force as a separate branch of the military. Kelly eventually became the largest employer in San Antonio. In 1995, the United States government began realignment of military facilities. Kelly was closed in 2001, partially combined with Lackland Air Force Base. The remainder was taken over by the Greater Kelly Development Authority of the state of Texas and redeveloped as a commercial and military industrial center.

== Properties ==
The development that began between the two world wars, and continued through post-World War II, is the area designated as Kelly Field Historic District.

National Register criteria for which the following properties qualify are two-fold:

- "Property is associated with events that have made a significant contribution to the broad patterns of our history."
- "Property embodies the distinct characteristic of a type, period, or method of construction or represents a work of a master, or possesses high artistic values, or represents a significant and distinguishable entity whose components lack individual distinction."

The following data is reproduced from Table 1 of NPS Form 10-900 Registration Form dated April 15, 2002. The dates represent the original construction period and subsequent improvements or other alterations to the property.

=== Contributing ===
Number/feature	Significant dates	Notes
Feature A	c.1940	237.5 by 1,100 feet (72.4 m × 335.3 m) esplanade along Goodrich and Mabry drives; Irregularly shaped parcels; Triangular intersection islands
Feature B	c.1940	sidewalks
Feature C	c.1940	streets
Feature D	c.1940	landscaping
1607	1943	weather building, storage
1609	1942	Norden bombsight storage
1610	1940, 1955, 1964, 1966, 1970, 1980, 1987	Air Corps operations hangar
1618	1937, 1953, 1973	oil storage, pump station
1625	1935, 1960s, 1983	miniature range, air conditioning; built by the Works Progress Administration
1627	1942, 1950, 1967, 1981	photo lab
1632	1940, 1950s, 1960s	Quartermaster maintenance
1635	1940, 1947, 1968	signal office, warehouse, Public Affairs Office
1638	1941	water pump house, electric substation
1643	1942	bath house; built by the Works Progress Administration
1644	1942	water filtration building; built by the Works Progress Administration
1645	1942	swimming pool; built by the Works Progress Administration
1650	1940, 1950s–1980s	enlisted men's barracks
1676	1940, 1950s–1980s	cadet barracks
1680	1940, 1943, 1960s–1980s	academic building, Air Depot HQ
1681	1940, 1971	NCO quarters
1682 though 1689	1940, 1973	NCO quarters
1690 through 1694, 1696	1940	NCO quarters
1750, 1752–1753, 1755, 1757–1758	1940, 1973	officer's quarters

=== Non contributing ===
Number	Significant dates	Notes
1600	1942, 1942, 1967, 1973, 1982	Norden bombsight repair shop
1611	1951	bus stop
1621	1940, 1953, 1968, 1969, 1971, 1989	Air Corps warehouse
1622	1987	bus stop
1623	1942, 1966	Quartermaster vehicle repair
1626	1940, 1950s, 1960s, 1971	Quartermaster warehouse
1628	1942, 1994	theater, classrooms
1636	1954	dental clinic, counseling office, housing
1637	1981	Base Exchange
1651	1959	electric substation
1654	1955	baseball diamond
1655	1986	heating plant
1669	1977	chapel
1670	1942, 1960s, 1994	temporary barracks, Judge Advocate
1671	1942, 1960s, 1994	temporary barracks, Judge Advocate
1674	1967	telephone equipment
1697	1972	storage shed
1698	1957	flagpole
