= Staacke Brothers Building =

- U.S. National Register of Historic Places
- Recorded Texas Historic Landmark
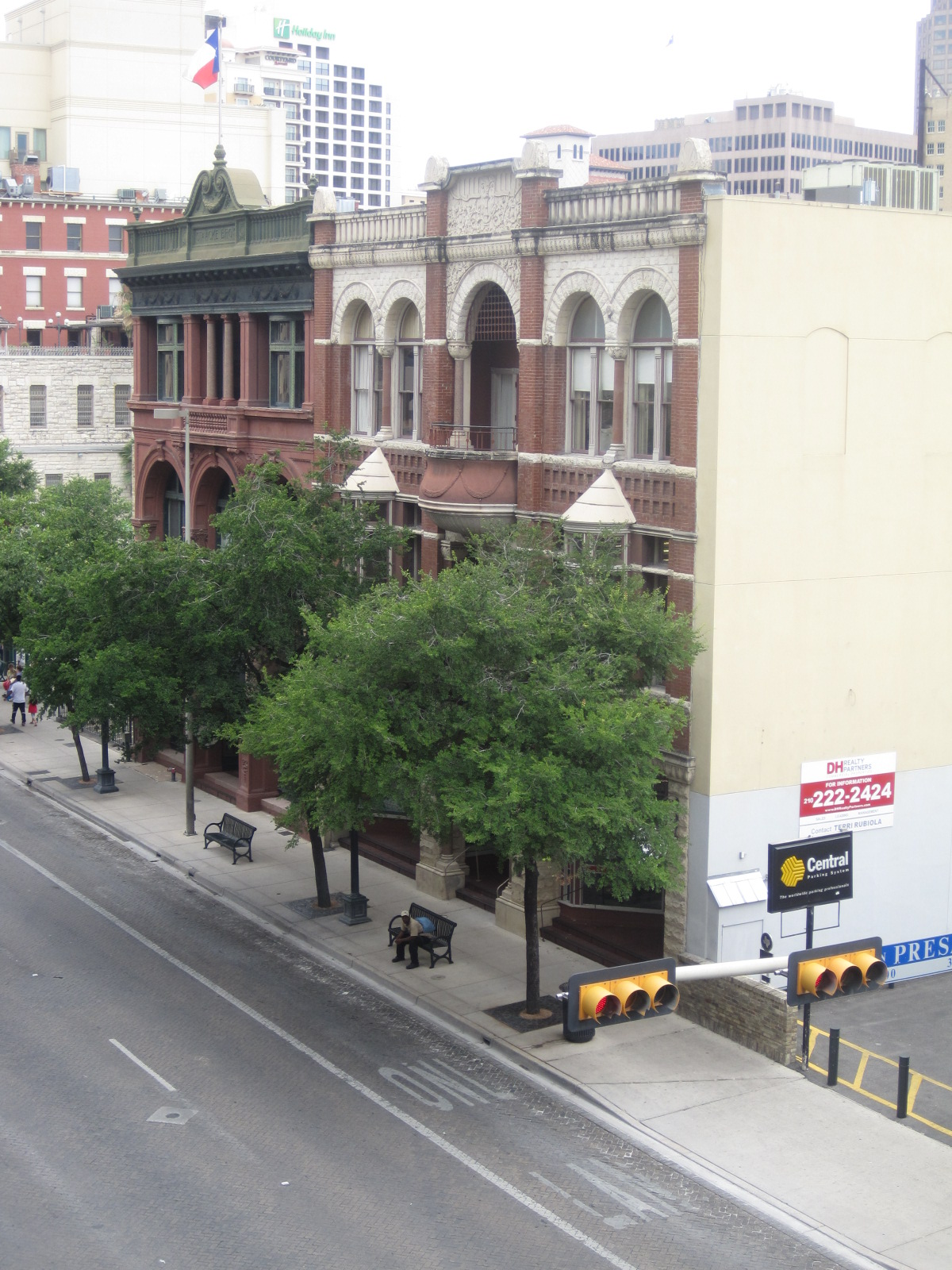
- Staacke Bros. Bldg (green and red-left); Stevens Bldg (white and red-right)

- Location within Texas Location within the United States
- Location: 309 E. Commerce St. San Antonio, Texas
- Coordinates: 29°25′28″N 98°29′23″W
- NRHP reference No.: 80004079
- RTHL No.: 5085

Significant dates
- Added to NRHP: September 9, 1980
- Designated RTHL: 1984

The Staacke Brothers Building is located in the Bexar County city of San Antonio in the U.S. state of Texas. It is listed on the National Register of Historic Places listings in Bexar County, Texas. The structure was designated a Recorded Texas Historic Landmark in 1984.

== Staacke Brothers ==
August F. Staacke (1825–1909) was an immigrant from Hanover, Germany, who developed a successful mercantile business in San Antonio. He carried Studebaker wagons, and imported commercial prairie schooner wagons that were built to withstand the rugged terrain of westward expansion. The "carriage trade" portion of his business was sold to his sons August, Rudolph and Herman, officially being known as the Staacke Brothers in 1889.

== Building ==
Originally the site of a First Presbyterian Church, August F. Staacke bought the lot at 309 E. Commerce in 1869, and hired John H. Kampmann to erect a storehouse on the site. In 1894, James Reily Gordon designed a Renaissance Revival three-story red sandstone and pink granite building that included a basement. The original building was 300 feet by 269.90 feet.

In 1979 a local hospital bought both the Stevens and the Staacke Brothers buildings with the intent of razing the structures to convert the property to a hospital parking lot. The San Antonio Conservation Society stepped in to preserve architectural history and purchased both buildings. In 1982, a group of investors bought and restored the two structures, with a conditional agreement that only preserved the front of both buildings. The rears of the structures were razed for a parking lot. The Staacke building was reduced to its current 42 feet in width and 97.5 feet in depth. Each floor covers an area of 4,000 square feet (370 m^{2}).
