= Francois P. Giraud =

American politician (1818–1877)

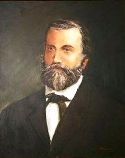

136th Mayor of San Antonio
- In office 1872–1875
- Preceded by: S. G. Newton
- Succeeded by: James H. French

Personal details
- Born: June 1, 1818 Charleston, South Carolina, U.S.
- Died: May 8, 1877 (aged 58) San Antonio, Texas, U.S.
- Resting place: San Fernando Cemetery #1; 29.4152333°N 98.5111286°W
- Spouse: María Apolinaria Treviño
- Occupation: Architect; Surveyor; Engineer; Builder

Francois P. Giraud (June 1, 1818, in Charleston – May 8, 1877, in San Antonio), also known as Francis P. Giraud, was an American politician. He was mayor of the Bexar County city of San Antonio in the U.S. state of Texas.

== Personal life ==
Giraud was born to French immigrants Francois and Adele Giraud in Charleston, South Carolina. The family moved to San Antonio about 1847. He attended Maryland's Mount St. Mary's University and furthered his education in Paris, France. He was married to María Apolinaria Treviño.

== Career ==
Giraud was the architect of Ursuline Academy, St. Mary's University and the reconstruction of the Cathedral of San Fernando. He was the first surveyor for the city of San Antonio and defined the boundaries for San Pedro Springs Park in 1851. He also defined the boundaries for the San Antonio Missions. A 19th century city surveyor book was found in 2011 that contained an 1849 plat map of the city drawn by Giraud.

He was a San Antonio city alderman 1857 – 1858. He became mayor of San Antonio in 1872, succeeding the outgoing Mayor Wilhelm Thielepape, and served in that capacity until 1875.

== Death and legacy ==
Giraud died in San Antonio on May 8, 1877, and is buried at San Fernando Cemetery #1. His biography, F. Giraud and San Antonio, was written by San Antonio artist and civic activist Emily Edwards.

== See also ==
- List of mayors of San Antonio
