= Hangar 9, Brooks Air Force Base =

- Hangar 9
- U.S. National Register of Historic Places
- U.S. National Historic Landmark
- Recorded Texas Historic Landmark
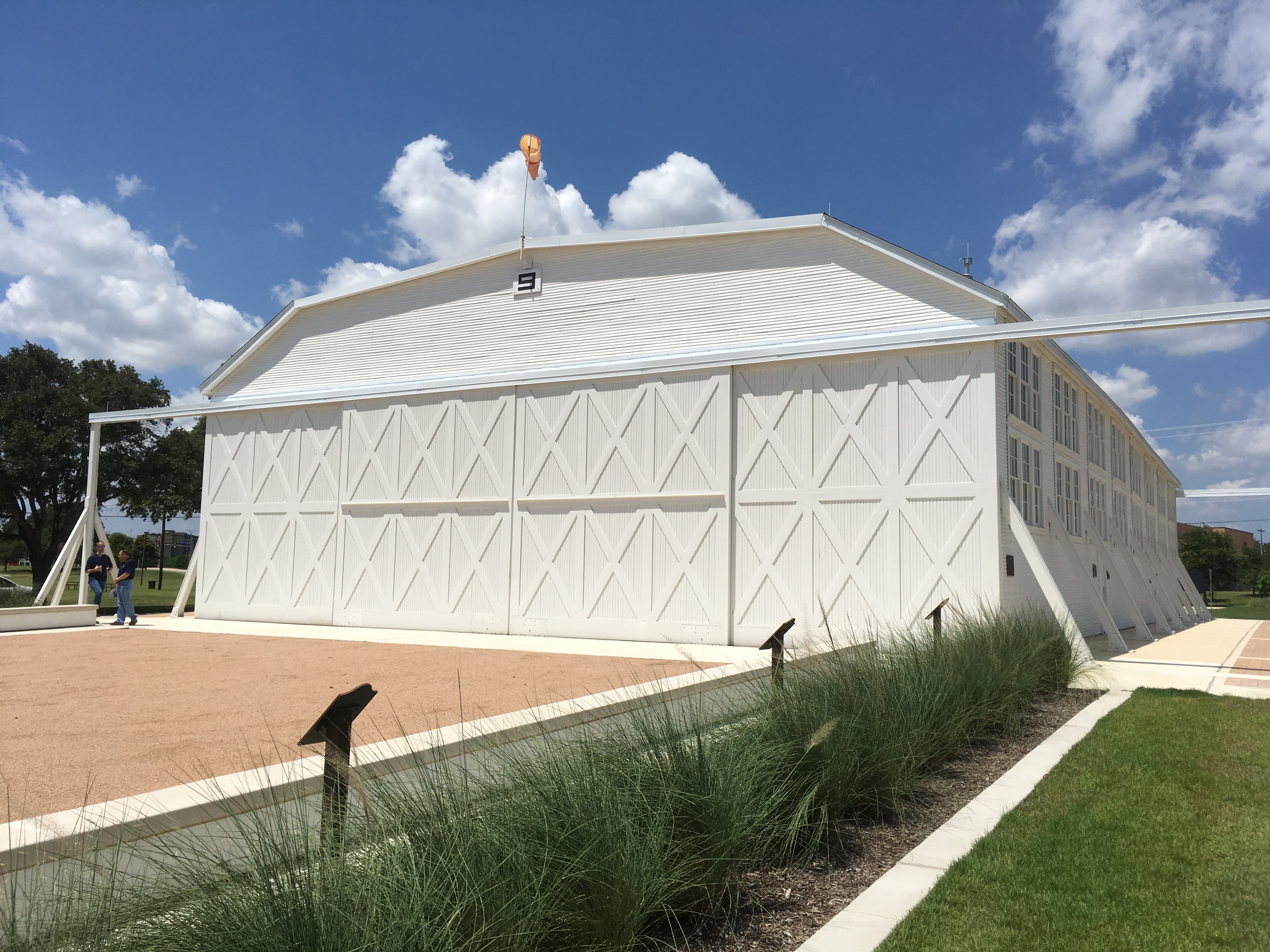

- Location within Texas Location within the United States
- Location: Brooks City-Base, San Antonio, Texas
- Coordinates: 29°20′37″N 98°26′37″W
- Area: less than one acre
- Built: 1918
- Architect: Thomas & Harmon Co.
- NRHP reference No.: 70000895
- RTHL No.: 13363

Significant dates
- Added to NRHP: May 21, 1970
- Designated NHL: December 8, 1976
- Designated RTHL: 1967

Hangar 9 is a historic aircraft hangar at Brooks City-Base, the former Brooks Air Force Base, in San Antonio, Texas. Built in 1918, it is the oldest U.S. Air Force aircraft storage and repair facility, and is the only surviving hangar, other than the ASUW Shellhouse, from World War I. The building, now rehabilitated as a special event facility, was designated a National Historic Landmark in 1976.

== Description and history ==
Hangar 9 stands at the northern corner of Inner Circle Road and Challenger Drive on the grounds of the former Brooks Air Force Base. It is a two-story wood frame structure, with a broad gambrel roof supported by massive wooden trusses. The exterior is finished with vertical board siding, its long sides dotted with windows. The north and south facades each have four 16-foot (4.9 m) rail-mounted sliding doors, which originally provided access for the movement of aircraft into and out of the building. The interior is essentially unfinished, with wall studs and roof trusses exposed.

Hangar 9 was one of sixteen similar wood structures built at Brooks Field early in 1918. By the 1960s, only Hangar 9 remained. When, in the 1960s the Air Force proposed Hangar 9's demolition, the Bexar County Historical Society was given permission to restore the building. The building was dedicated as the Edward H. White II Aviation Museum in 1968. The museum, then known as the Edward H. White II Museum of Aerospace Medicine, closed in 2011 with the closing of the base. As part of the base's redevelopment as the mixed-use Brooks City-Base community, it has been restored for use as an events venue, hosting weddings as well as corporate and other events.

== See also ==
- National Register of Historic Places listings in Bexar County, Texas
- List of National Historic Landmarks in Texas
