= Stevens Building (San Antonio, Texas) =

- U.S. National Register of Historic Places
- Recorded Texas Historic Landmark
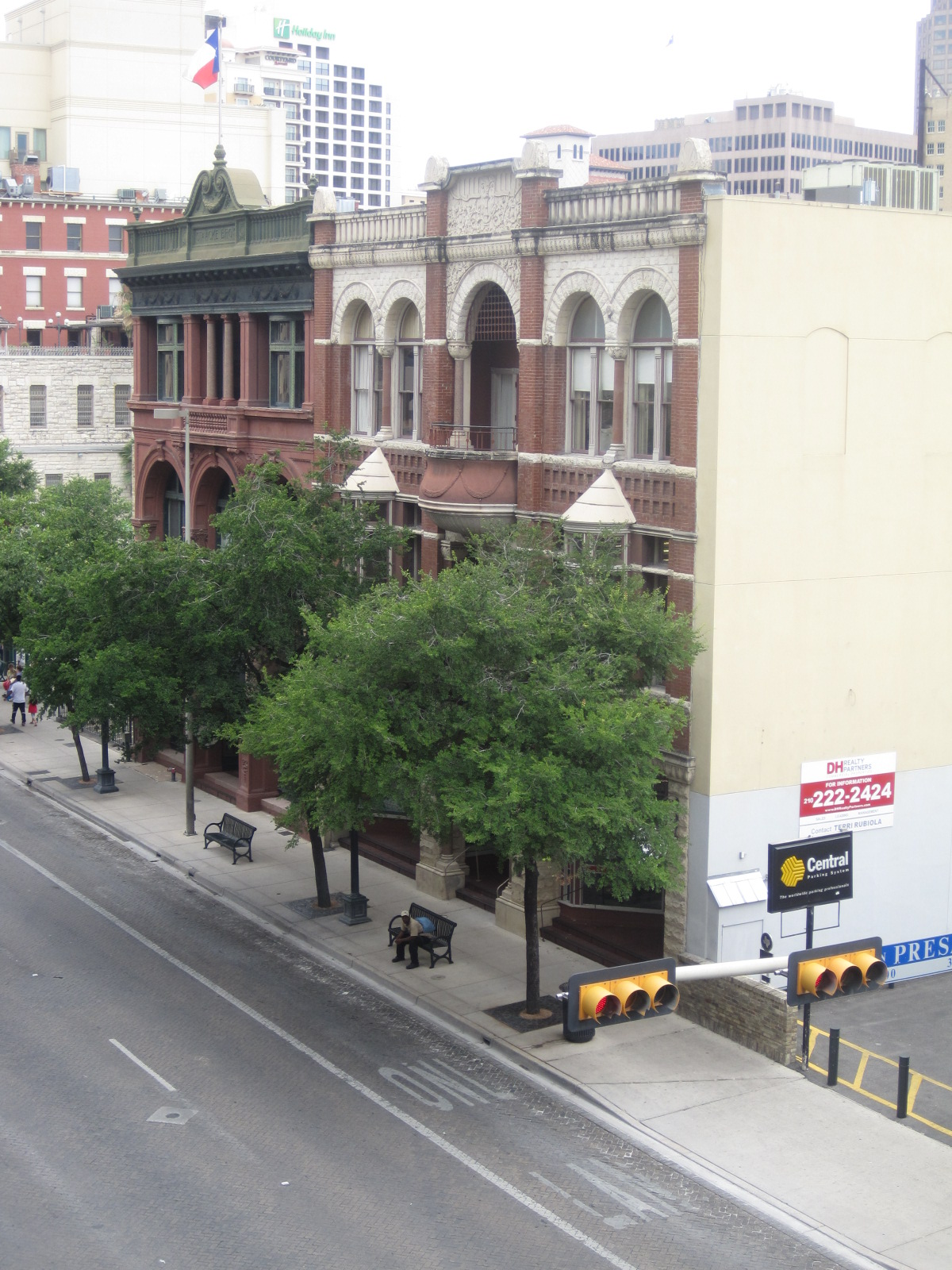
- Stevens Bldg (white and red-right); Staacke Bros. Bldg (green and red-left)

- Location within Texas Location within the United States
- Location: 315 E. Commerce St. San Antonio, Texas
- Coordinates: 29°25′27″N 98°29′21″W
- NRHP reference No.: 84001614
- RTHL No.: 5116

Significant dates
- Added to NRHP: May 10, 1984
- Designated RTHL: 1984

The Stevens Building is located in San Antonio, Texas. Completed in 1891, architect James Riely Gordon designed the building for local businessman John J. Stevens. It is listed on the National Register of Historic Places listings in Bexar County, Texas. The structure was designated a Recorded Texas Historic Landmark in 1984.

== Building ==
The three-story Richardsonian Romanesque Stevens Building at 315 E. Commerce was designed by architect James Riely Gordon for San Antonio businessman John J. Stevens and completed in 1891. The Wagner & Chabot bicycle wholesaler occupied the building for 45 years. Bledsoe Furniture Company was a tenant for 33 years. The University of San Antonio held the lease on the entire third floor for more than half a century.

In 1979, a local hospital bought both the Stevens and the Staacke buildings with the intent of razing the structures to convert the property to a hospital parking lot. The San Antonio Conservation Society stepped in to preserve architectural history and purchased both buildings. In 1982, a group of investors bought and restored the two structures. The building's interior was remodeled for contemporary tenants. Historic photographs were used to restore the exterior as authentically accurate to the original as possible. The facade is detailed with oriel windows, and brick and red granite, finished with carved limestone.
