= Casa Navarro =

Historic site in San Antonio, Texas, U.S.

- Jose Antonio Navarro House Complex
- U.S. National Register of Historic Places
- U.S. National Historic Landmark
- Recorded Texas Historic Landmark
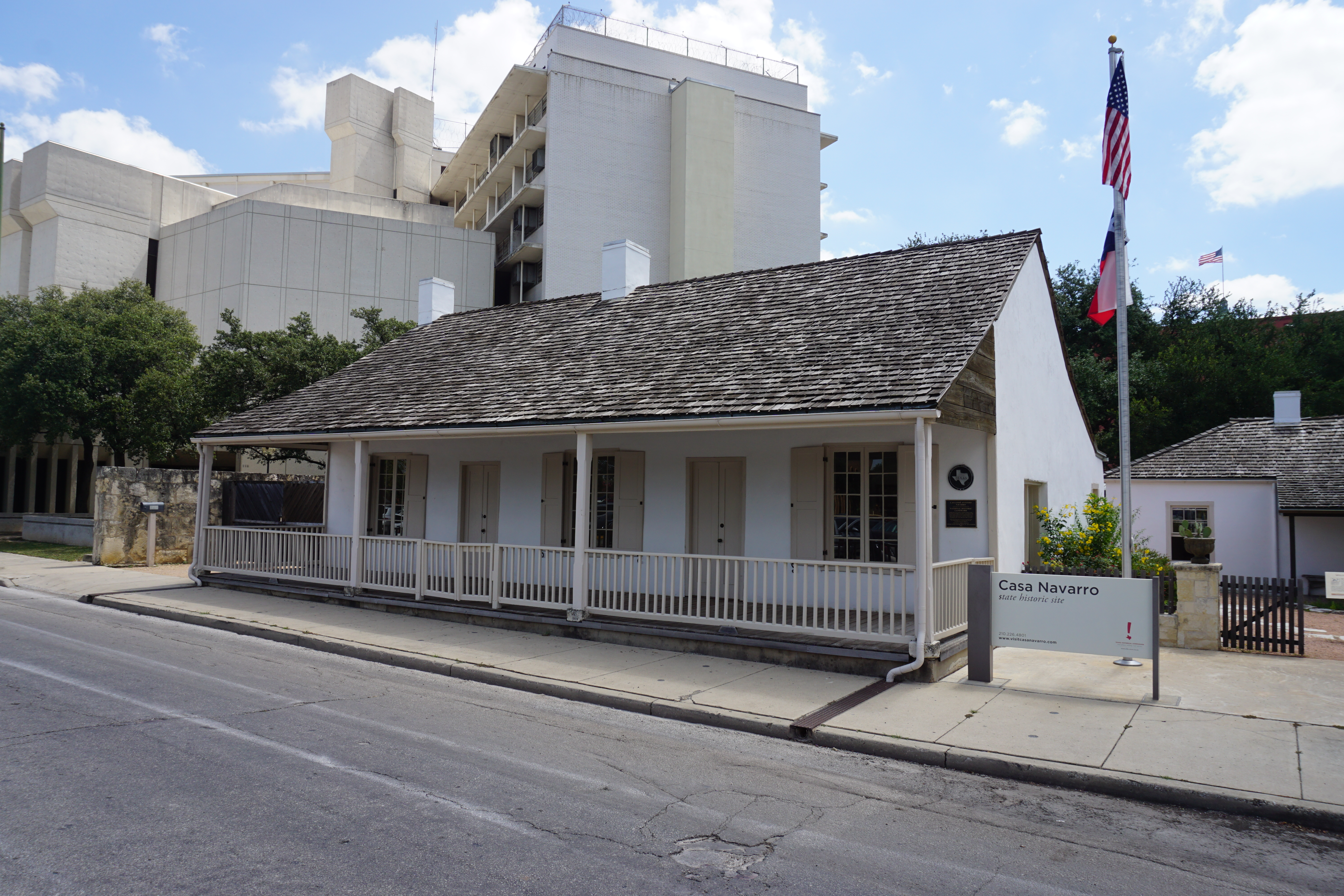
- Casa Navarro State Historic Site in 2017

- Location within Texas Location within the United States
- Interactive map showing the location of Casa Navarro
- Location: 228 S. Laredo St., San Antonio, Texas
- Coordinates: 29°25′22″N 98°29′49″W
- Area: 1 acre (0.40 ha)
- Built: 1855
- NRHP reference No.: 72001353
- RTHL No.: 3555

Significant dates
- Added to NRHP: March 24, 1972
- Designated NHL: December 23, 2016
- Designated RTHL: 1962

Casa Navarro is a historic site in San Antonio, Bexar County, Texas, United States. The original house complex was the residence of Texas patriot José Antonio Navarro (1795–1871), a rancher, merchant, leading advocate for Tejano rights, and one of only two native-born Texans to sign the Texas Declaration of Independence. Navarro first bought the property, about 1.5 acres, in 1832. The limestone, caliche block, and adobe structures were built c. 1832–1855, and Navarro moved onto the property soon after.

The site is situated in the heart of old San Antonio, in what used to be a thriving Tejano neighborhood known as Laredito. The structures were acquired and restored by the San Antonio Conservation Society between 1960 and 1964, and the site was opened to the public in October 1964. The site was designated a Texas State Historic Landmark in 1962, and listed on the National Register of Historic Places in 1972. The San Antonio Conservation Society deeded Casa Navarro to the Texas Parks and Wildlife Department (TPWD) in 1975 who operated it as José Antonio Navarro State Historical Park. On January 1, 2008, the house was transferred from the TPWD to the Texas Historical Commission who renamed it Casa Navarro State Historic Site. It was designated a National Historic Landmark in 2016.

Today, visitors can tour Navarro's one-story limestone house — an example of early-statehood domestic architecture — read copies of his writing and discuss questions of history with informed staff. There is also a two-story square store and office building, noted for its bold quoins, which anchor the edges of the building's walls. The detached adobe and caliche block kitchen is typical of early Texas architecture with front and rear porches.

== See also ==
- List of Texas state historic sites
- List of National Historic Landmarks in Texas
