= Otto Bombach House =

Historic house in Texas, United States

- U.S. Historic district – Contributing property
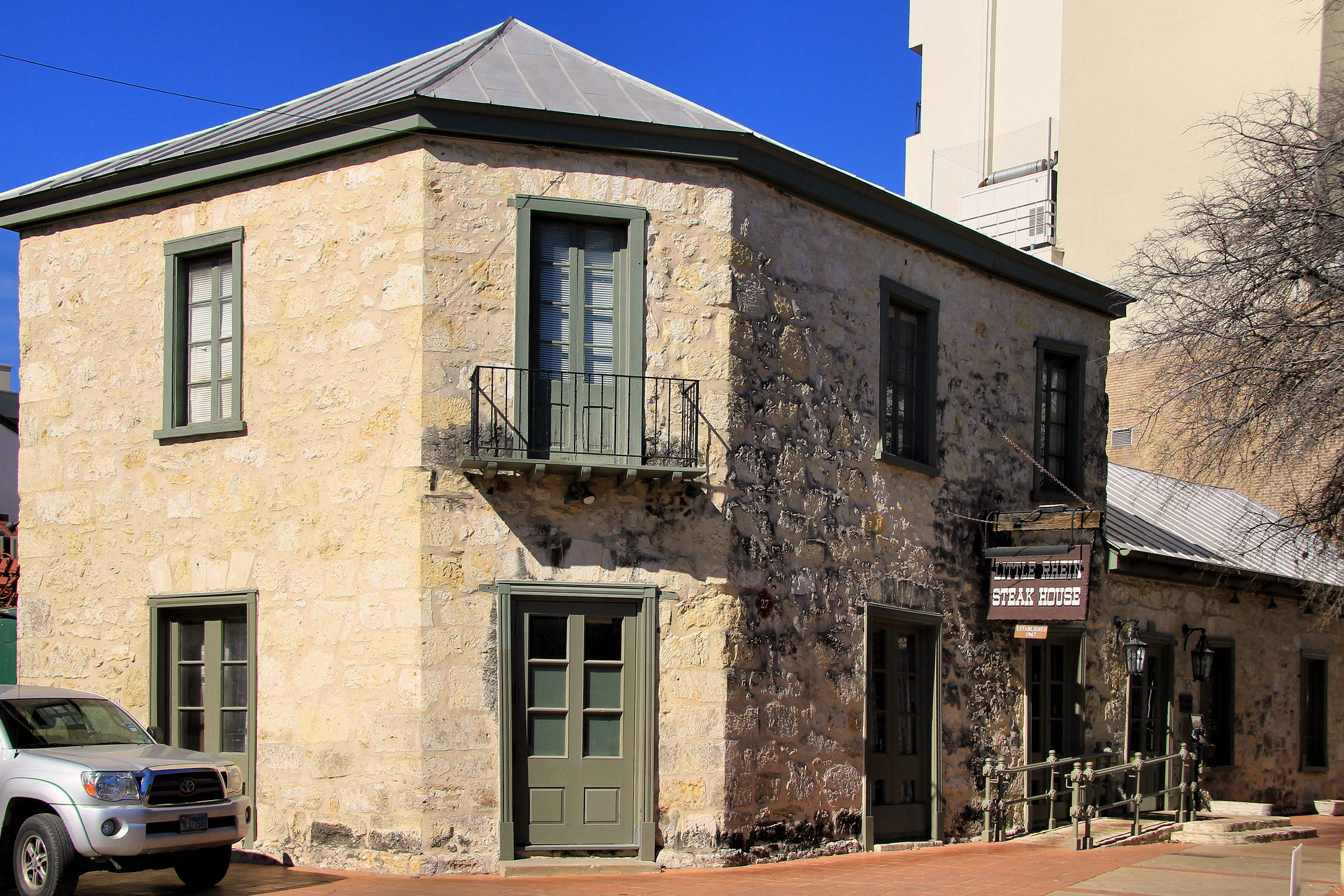

- Location within Texas Location within the United States
- Location: 231 South Alamo Street; Bexar County, Texas
- Coordinates: 29°25′17″N 98°29′18″W
- Part of: La Villita Historic District (ID72001350)
- Designated CP: January 20, 1972

The Otto Bombach House is a contributing structure in the La Villita Historic District of the Bexar County city of San Antonio in the U.S. state of Texas. The one-and-two-story native limestone structure was built by German immigrant Bombach in the mid-19th century. It was acquired and restored by the San Antonio Conservation Society (SACS), which still owns the property. Over the decades, SACS has leased the property to a variety of tenants, including the San Antonio Press Club. Currently, the building houses the Little Rhein Steak House.
