= Ximenes Chapel =

Historic chapel in San Antonio, US

- U.S. National Register of Historic Places
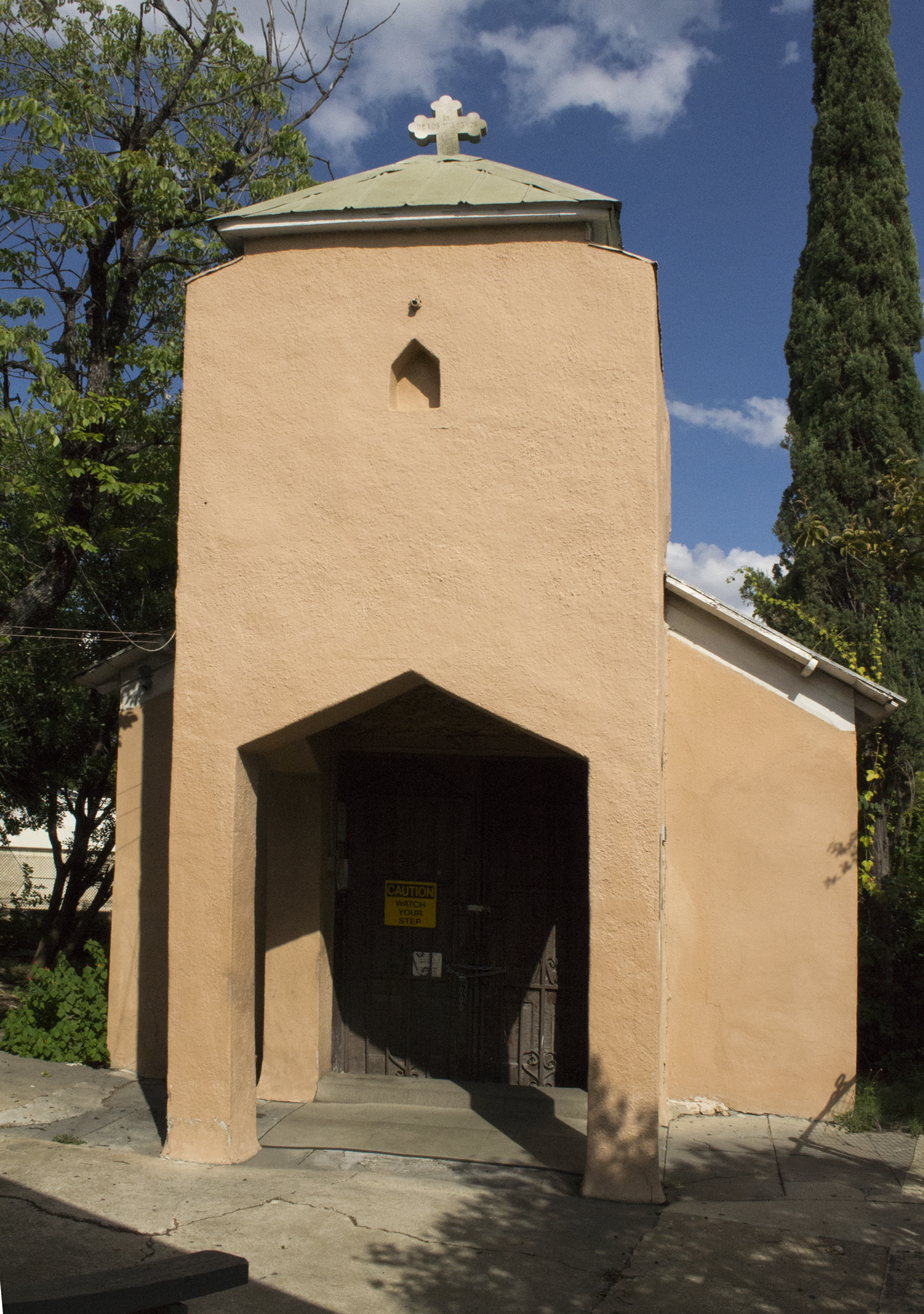

- Location within Texas Location within the United States
- Location: 47 Haven for Hope Way, San Antonio, Texas
- Coordinates: 29°26′3″N 98°30′13″W
- Area: less than one acre
- Built: 1813
- NRHP reference No.: 80004080
- Added to NRHP: September 08, 1980

Ximenes Chapel (Chapel of the Miracles) is a historic chapel at 113 Ruiz Street in San Antonio, Texas.

The chapel has long been an important gathering place for San Antonio's Mexican-American and Hispanic Catholic population.

The chapel was rebuilt in the 1920s to replace the original chapel from 1813, which had been destroyed in a fire. It was added to the National Register of Historic Places in 1980.
