= La Villita =

- La Villita Historic District
- U.S. National Register of Historic Places
- U.S. Historic district
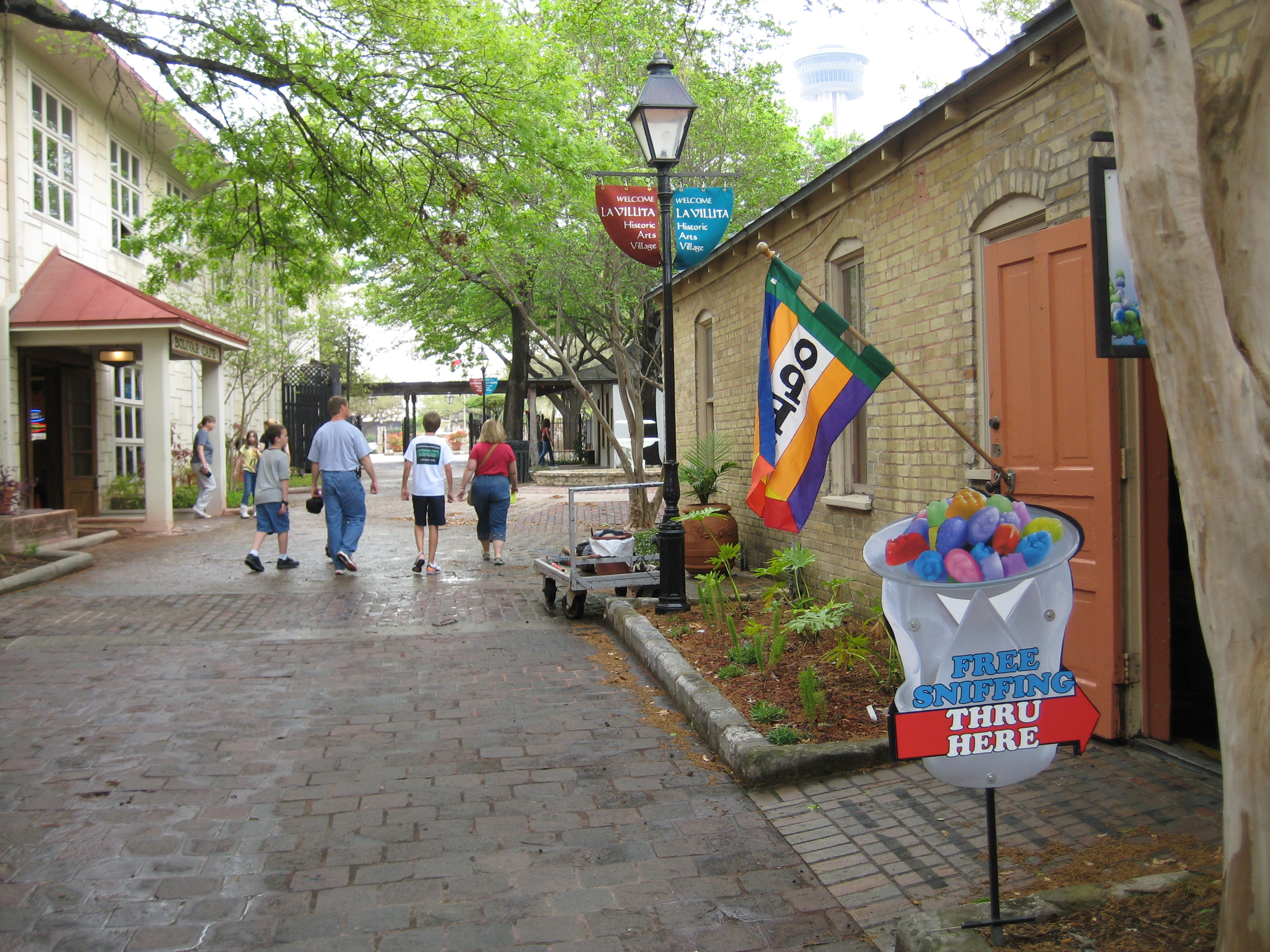

- Location within Texas Location within the United States
- Location: San Antonio, Texas
- Coordinates: 29°25′13″N 98°29′20″W
- Built: 1845
- Architectural style: Mission/Spanish Revival
- NRHP reference No.: 72001350
- Added to NRHP: January 20, 1972

La Villita Historic Arts Village is an art community in downtown San Antonio, Texas, United States. There are art galleries, stores selling souvenirs, gifts, custom jewelry, pottery, and imported Mexican folk art, as well as several restaurants in the district. La Villita connects to the San Antonio River Walk and its outdoor venue, the Arneson River Theatre. It is close to the Alamo, the Henry B. Gonzalez Convention Center, Rivercenter Mall, and HemisFair Park. It is within walking distance of most downtown hotels.

Located on the south bank of the San Antonio River, La Villita was one of San Antonio's first neighborhoods. It was a Native American settlement and then a collection of primitive brush huts, called jacales, for the Spanish soldiers (and their Indian wives and children) stationed nearby at the Mission San Antonio de Valero (an active mission from about 1718 to 1793, now better known as the Alamo). After a flood in 1819 washed away most of the huts, more substantial adobe houses replaced them.

Late in the 19th century, European immigrants from Germany, France, and Italy moved into the area and soon became active in business and trades: retailers, bankers, educators, and craftsmen. The variety of architectural styles seen in La Villita's buildings reflects the cultural mix, from the one-room homes of the poor to the larger houses of the prosperous.

La Villita deteriorated into a slum in the early part of the 20th century. During the Great Depression, work began on the River Walk, a make-work project funded by the Works Progress Administration which came close to La Villita. The project, led by Mayor Maury Maverick, sponsored a companion effort in 1939 by the National Youth Administration to restore and preserve this colorful part of San Antonio's history. The NYA offered classes in arts and crafts as part of its program.

Today La Villita is an arts community, and is included in the National Register of Historic Places listings in Bexar County, Texas. The galleries and shops found in one city block offer art by local and regional artists featuring oil paintings, sculptures, watercolors, metal art, rock art, textiles, copperwares, pottery, jewelry, stained glass, and regional folk art.

During four nights of the Fiesta San Antonio each April, La Villita is host to a Night in Old San Antonio with dozens of booths grouped to offer fifteen areas for various kinds of food, such as Sauerkraut Bend, China Town, Irish Flat, and the Mexican Market. The outdoor festival, with its narrow streets decorated with paper flowers and papel picado (cut paper banners), typically attracts 85,000 celebrants, many wearing costumes and unusual hats. The event is a major fundraiser for the San Antonio Conservation Society.

== Contributing properties ==
Twenty-seven houses or buildings are listed as notable in the district. Some of these are also notable individual listings.

La Villita Historic District Contributing Structures
Structure Name	Image	Address		Date Built	RTHL	Notes
Aldrete House		323 East Nueva		c1818	1966	
Aldrete House (rear house)		323 East Nueva		c1818	1966	
Otto Bombach House	Otto Bombach House	231 South Alamo		1847-1855		Currently Little Rhein Steak House
Canadian House		206 South Presa				
Caxias House		416 B Villita				
Cos House	Cos House	503 Villita	Bldg. 18	Pre-1835	1965	Home of Mexican general Martín Perfecto de Cos, who herein signed the Articles of Capitulation on Dec. 9, 1835, ending the Siege of Béxar.
Jeremiah Dashiell House	Jeremiah Dashiell House	515 Villita			1962	Aka Casa Villita
Diaz House		206 Arciniega				
Elmendorf House		220 Arciniega		c.1811		a.k.a. Elmendorf-Taylor House
Faville (Florian) House		510 Villita	Bldg. 14			Currently River Art Group Gallery (14), B.Link Gallery (14B), and an upstairs event rental venue Florian Hall (14c)
German-English School	German-English School	419 South Alamo	Bldg. 10 & 11	1859,1869	1962	Consists of two buildings erected a decade apart; Currently Bird & Pear (10) and Copper Gallery (11)
Gissi House		Plaza Nueva		c1854, rebuilt 1969		
Louis Gresser House		225 South Presa				Owned by the San Antonio Conservation Society
Jack Hays House		212 South Presa		c1847	1962	John Coffee Hays was a Texas Ranger
Henshaw House (former Martinez property)	Henshaw House	515 Villita				
House		420 Villita				
House		514 Villita				
House		Arciniega and South Alamo				
Kuhn House		218 South Presa				
Little Church of La Villita	Little Church of La Villita	418 Villita		1876	1962	Currently non denominational
McAllister Building	McAllister Building	301-303 South Alamo				
Anton Phillip House		422 South Presa				a.k.a. Staffer House
William Richter House	William Richter House	419 South Presa		c1868		
San Martin House		416 A South Presa				
Walter C. Tynan House		401 South Presa		mid-1880s		
Yturri House		327 South Presa				
Manuel Yturri House		325 South Presa				
