= Ursuline Academy (San Antonio, Texas) =

- U.S. National Register of Historic Places
- Recorded Texas Historic Landmark
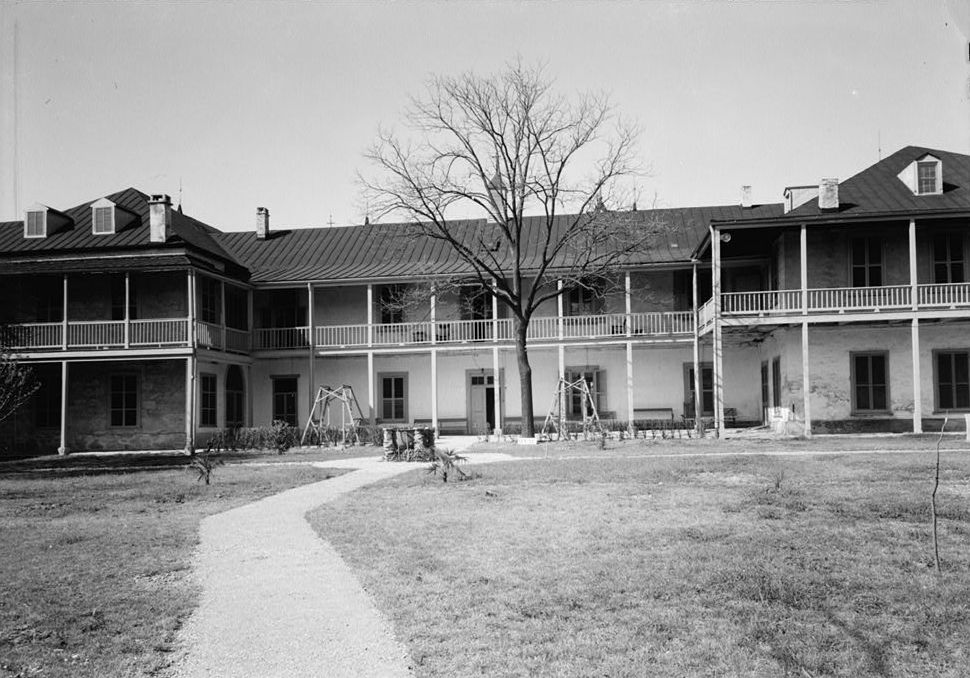

- Location within Texas Location within the United States
- Interactive map showing the location for Ursuline Academy
- Location: San Antonio, Texas, US
- Coordinates: 29°25′52″N 98°29′32″W
- Built: 1851
- Architect: Francois Giraud; Jules Poincard
- Architectural style: Gothic
- NRHP reference No.: 69000201
- RTHL No.: 2069000201
- Added to NRHP: November 25, 1969

Ursuline Academy is a former all-girls Catholic school located at 300 Augusta St. in downtown San Antonio, Texas. The school is now occupied by the UTSA Southwest Campus.

The school was founded in 1851 by Jean-Marie Odin, with construction on the building taking place from 1848 to 1851. It was designed by architects Francois Giraud and Jules Poincard and was built using the rammed earth technique. Over the next several decades, the campus was expanded to include two chapels: one in 1951 and a larger one in 1868, a dorm building in 1866, a priest house in the 1880s and lastly a second school building in 1910.

In 1965, the school was closed and moved to northwest side of San Antonio, with the buildings left abandoned until 1971. The property was then bought by the San Antonio Conservation Society and was restored throughout the next decade. It was then occupied by the Southwest School of Art (SSA). In 2022, the Southwest School of Art integrated into the University of Texas at San Antonio as the UTSA Southwest Campus where it continues much of the work that SSA pioneered including community art classes for both youths and adults. It was added to the National Register of Historic Places in November 1969.
