= Lerma's Nite Club =

- U.S. National Register of Historic Places
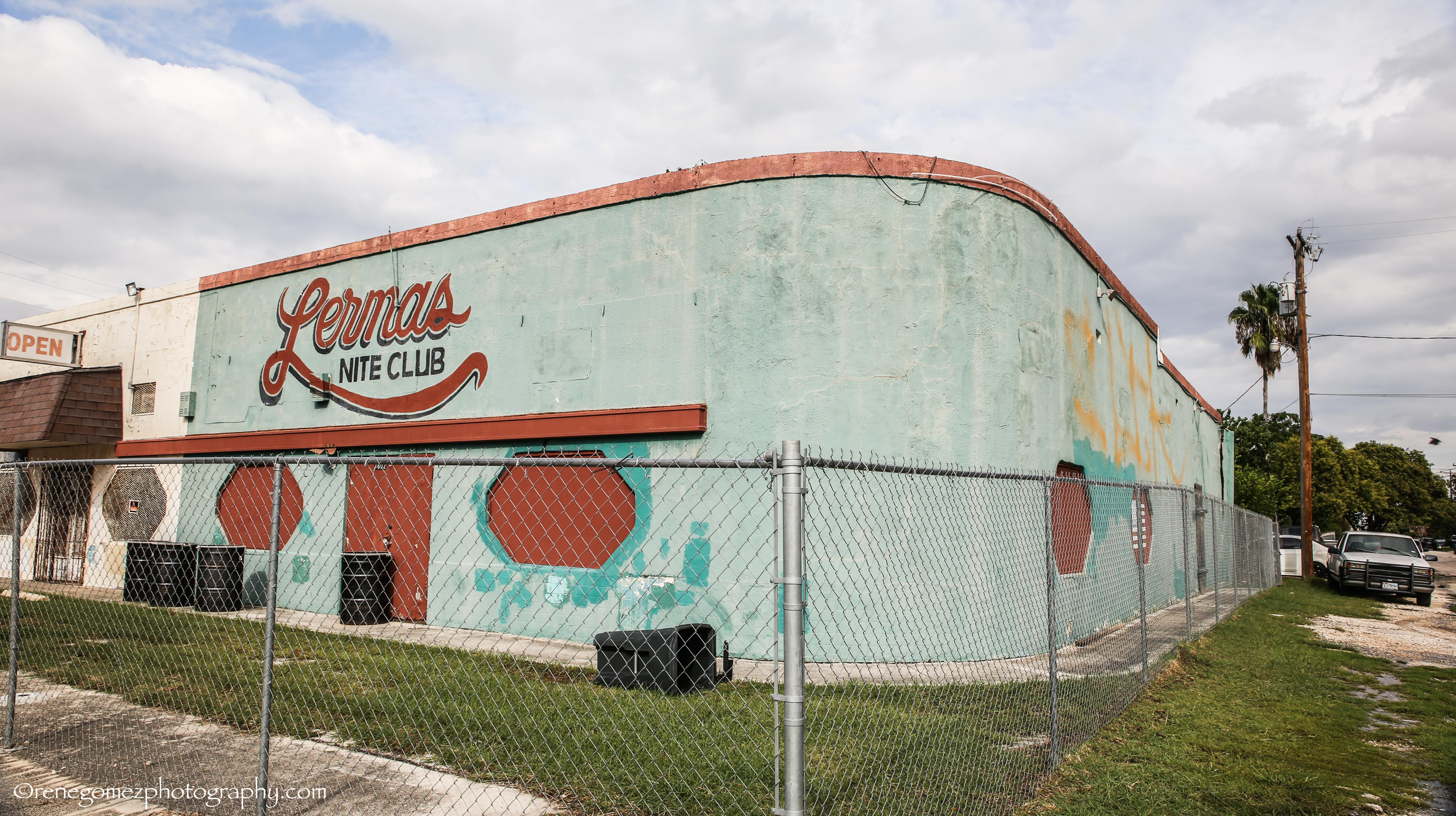

- Location within Texas Location within the United States
- Interactive map showing the location for Lerma's Nite Club
- Location: San Antonio, Texas, US
- Coordinates: 29°26′40″N 98°31′29″W
- Built: 1942
- Architectural style: Streamline Moderne
- NRHP reference No.: 11000135
- Added to NRHP: March 21, 2011

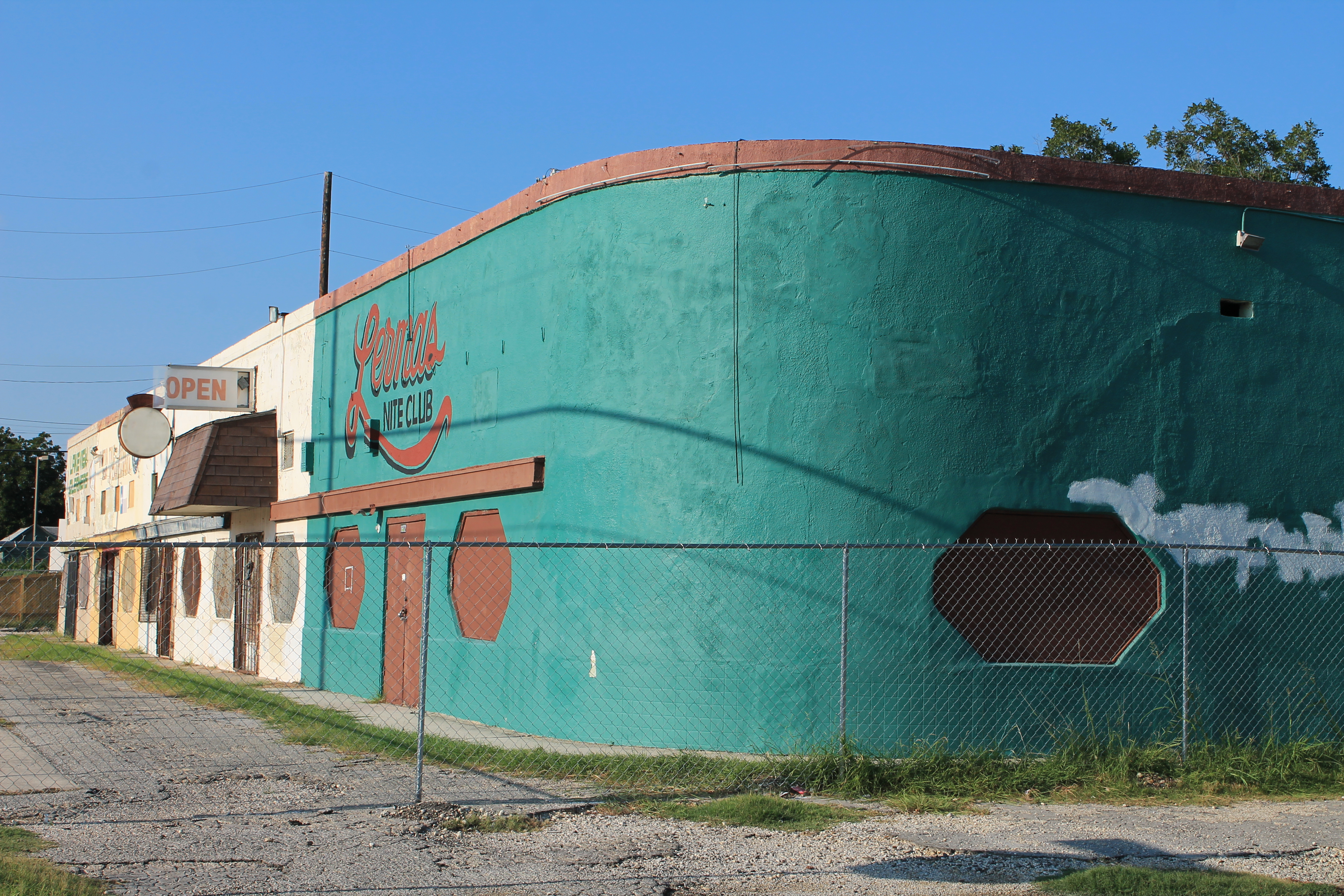

Lerma's Nite Club is a former conjunto music venue located in San Antonio, Texas.

The building was constructed in 1942, with Lerma's first opening in approximately 1948 under the name El Sombrero, taking up the southern end of the building located on 1602–1612 North Zarzamora Street. The club operated until 2010, when it was shut down due to the building violating safety regulations. The venue appeared in the 1997 film Selena. On March 21, 2011, it was added to the National Register of Historic Places due to its significance in the Hispanic community as well as due to being an important entertainment venue.

The building is an example of Streamline Modern architecture.

In 2016, $500,000 was added to San Antonio's city budget dedicated to the renovation of the building.
