= Charline McCombs Empire Theatre =

- Brady Building--Empire Theater; Charline McCombs Empire Theater
- U.S. National Register of Historic Places
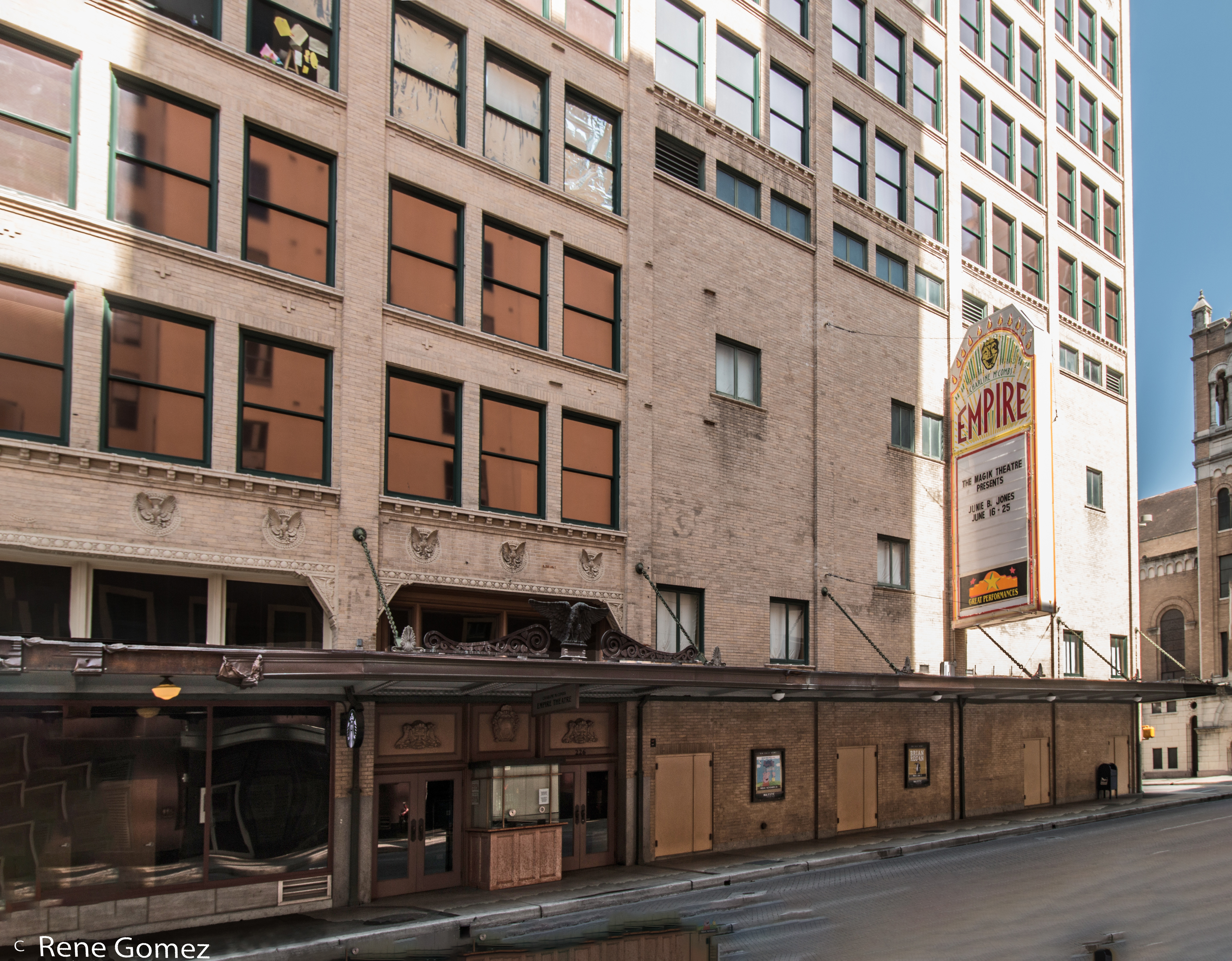
- The building in 2017

- Location within Texas Location within the United States
- Location: 204 E. Houston St.—226 N. St. Mary's St. San Antonio, Texas
- Coordinates: 29°25′33″N 98°29′27″W
- Area: less than one acre
- Built: 1914
- Architect: Mauran, Russell & Crowell
- Architectural style: Classical Revival
- NRHP reference No.: 99000283
- Added to NRHP: March 17, 1999

Charline McCombs Empire Theatre is a performing arts venue in San Antonio, Texas, United States. It hosts a variety of live events — such as comedy shows, music concerts, children's theater, classic productions — and it is also open for private events. It is listed in the National Register of Historic Places.

== History ==
Charline McCombs Empire Theatre was established as Empire Theatre in 1913 where the Rische Opera House once stood. Thomas Brady hired Mauran, Russell & Crowell, an architectural firm from St. Louis, to design the theater. It originally operated as a vaudeville house and later as a movie house.

The Empire was considered as one of the most modern theatres in Texas. Brady ensured that the theatre utilized state-of-the-art lighting system, acoustics, motion pictures and stage equipment. The theatre's walls were decorated with ornamental medallions and intricate paintings with 23-carat gold leafing.

A deluge devastated the Empire Theatre in 1921. The 9-foot (2.7 m) flood damaged the interiors and Brady struggled to restore the Empire. He resorted to covering the walls with thick layers of white paint. The Empire still managed to boom in the 1920s. Hollywood's biggest stars, Charlie Chaplin, Lon Chaney and Mae West, visited the place to promote their films.

The Empire Theatre, however, eventually declined. It turned to a B-movie house and later served adult films until it shut down in 1978.

The city of San Antonio bought the decaying theatre in 1987. There was a cooperation with Las Casas Foundation to raise funds and revive the Empire. Charline McCombs, a native businesswoman, donated $1 million. It was renamed as Charline McCombs Empire Theatre as a tribute. The grand reopening was held in 1998 and Kenny Rogers was the first performer.

The Charline McCombs Empire Theatre was added to the National Register of Historic Places in 1999.
