= Exchange Building (San Antonio) =

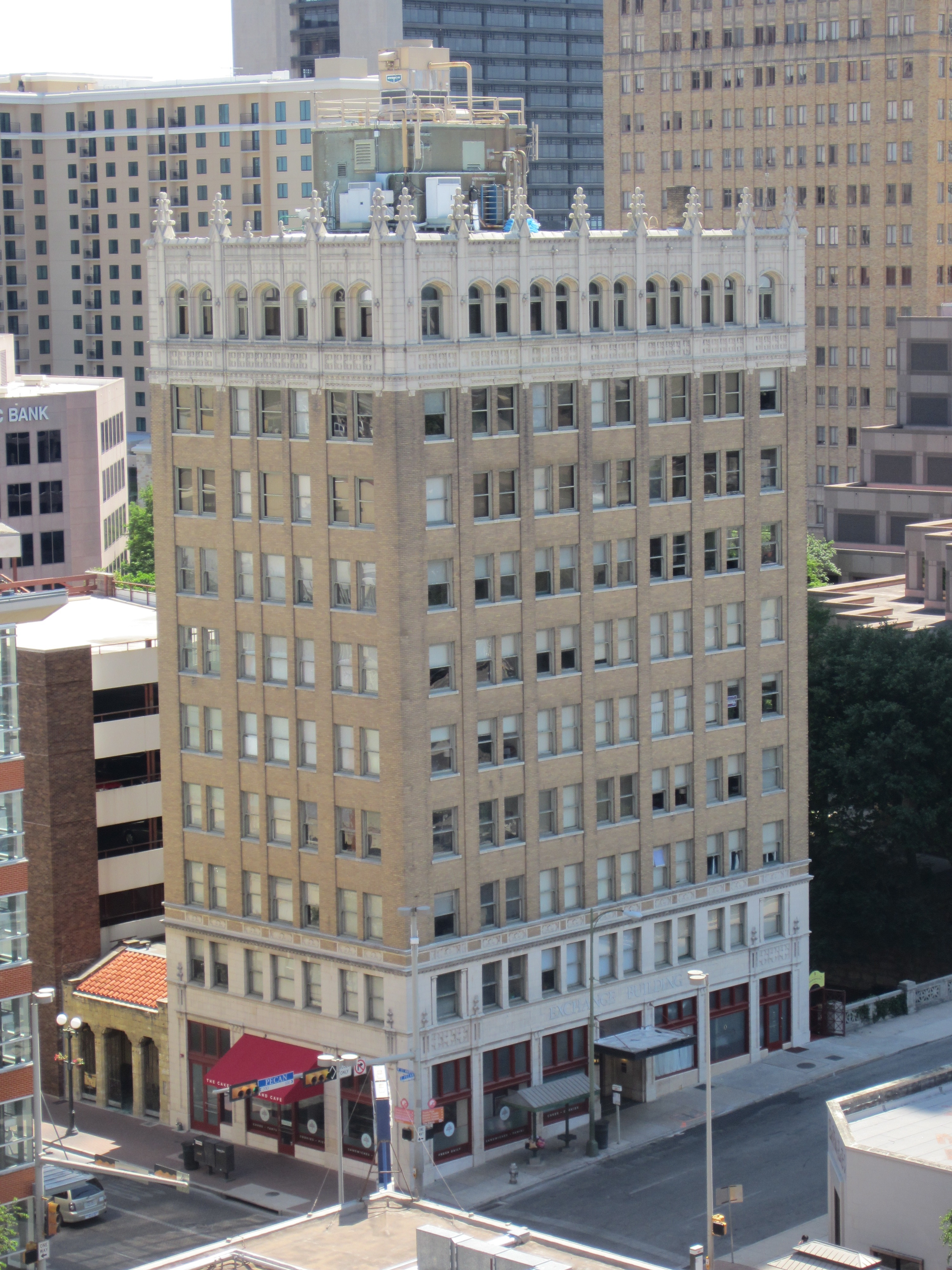
- Exchange Building, seen from across the street to the north on the grounds of the Bank of America Plaza.
- Interactive map of the Exchange Building area
- Alternative names: American Hospital and Life Building, Builders Exchange Building

General information
- Type: Residential
- Location: 152 East Pecan St; San Antonio, Texas; United States
- Coordinates: 29.428432°N 98.491676°W
- Completed: 1925

Height
- Roof: 35.36 m (116.0 ft)

Technical details
- Floor count: 10

Design and construction
- Architects: George Willis, Emmet Jackson, Lake Flato Architects, Rehler Vaughn & Koone

The Exchange Building is a historic 10-story residential building located in Downtown San Antonio in the U.S. state of Texas.

It was listed on the National Register of Historic Places in 1994. In the early 1990s it was renovated into apartments by Lake/Flato Architects.

Originally built for the San Antonio Builder's Exchange, the Exchange Building was later occupied by the American Hospital and Life Insurance Company.
