= Scottish Rite Cathedral (San Antonio, Texas) =

- U.S. National Register of Historic Places
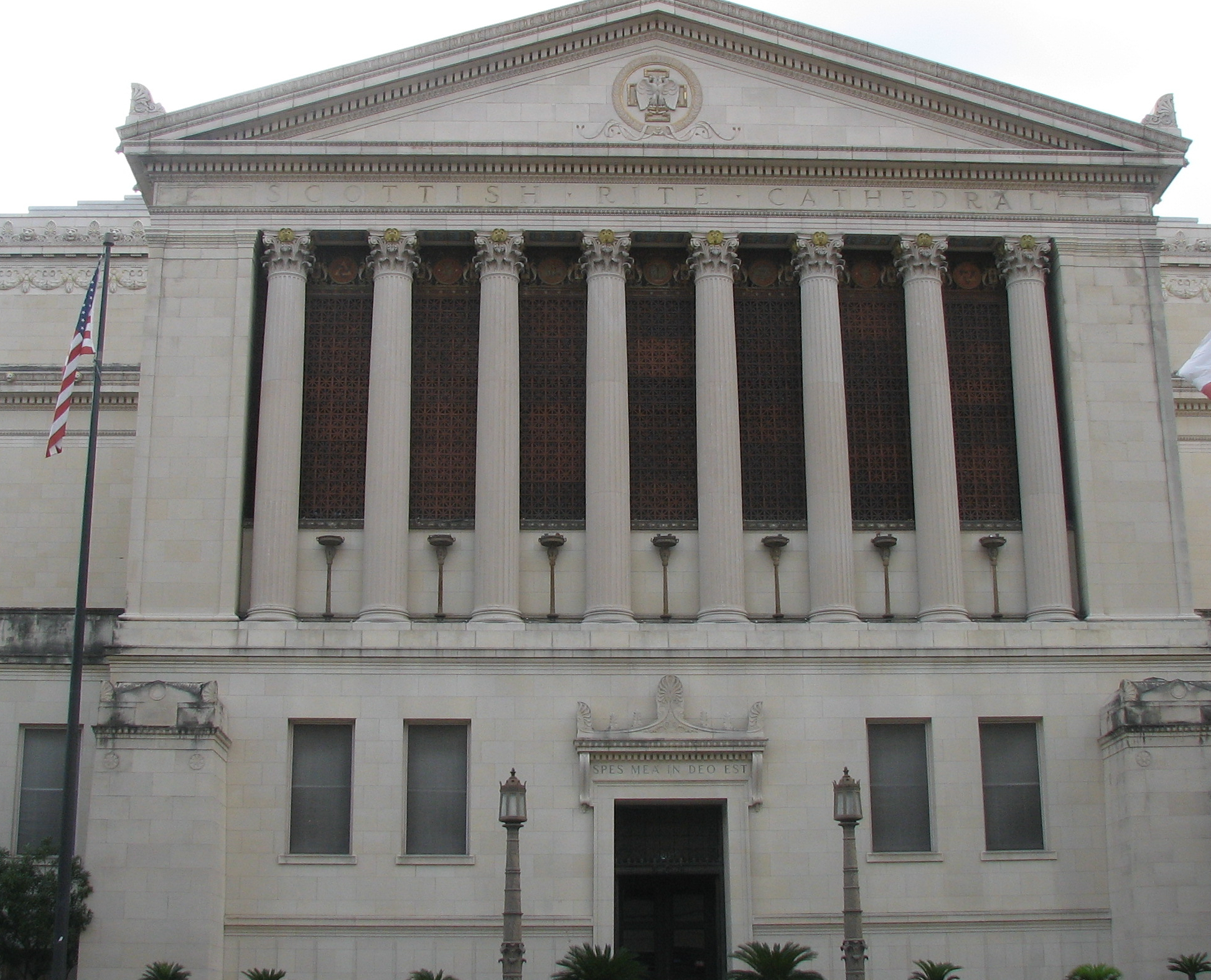

- Location within Texas Location within the United States
- Location: 308 Ave. E, San Antonio, Texas
- Coordinates: 29°25′39″N 98°29′13″W
- Built: 1924
- Architect: Greene, Herbert M.; Cameron, Ralph H.
- Architectural style: Classical Revival
- NRHP reference No.: 96000068
- Added to NRHP: February 16, 1996

The Scottish Rite Cathedral of San Antonio, Texas is located at 308 Avenue E in San Antonio. Construction began on it in 1922 and was completed in 1924, at a cost of $1.5 million.

It is a 5.5-story building in the style of a classic revival temple, and serves as a headquarters and meeting place for Scottish Rite Masonry in San Antonio, and for the South Texas Region. The building also frequently serves as an event hall for performing arts and various cultural events.

The building features notable architectural elements including: gabled front portico, Corinthian columns, a terracotta frieze, and elaborately sculpted bronze front doors featuring George Washington and Sam Houston which were created by Pompeo Coppini. Coppini was a thirty-second degree member of the San Antonio Consistory. In 1926, sculptor Coppini was one of the honored guests who delivered an address at the November 15 dedication and installation of the doors.

The cathedral was listed on the National Register of Historic Places in 1996.

== Partnership with San Antonio Philharmonic ==
In October 2024, it was announced that the 2,200-seat Scottish Rite Auditorium within the Cathedral would become the new home of the San Antonio Philharmonic. In this co-ownership partnership between Scottish Rite leadership and the San Antonio Philharmonic, concerts would take place in the historical venue simultaneous to fundraising efforts for infrastructure modernization estimated to cost between $5 million and $10 million. Necessary improvements include accessibility and ADA compliance, which the building lacked at the time of the agreement, leading to patrons facing challenges in attempting to attend concerts.
