= San Antonio Conservation Society =

Nonprofit organization in Texas, U.S.

Conservation Society of San Antonio
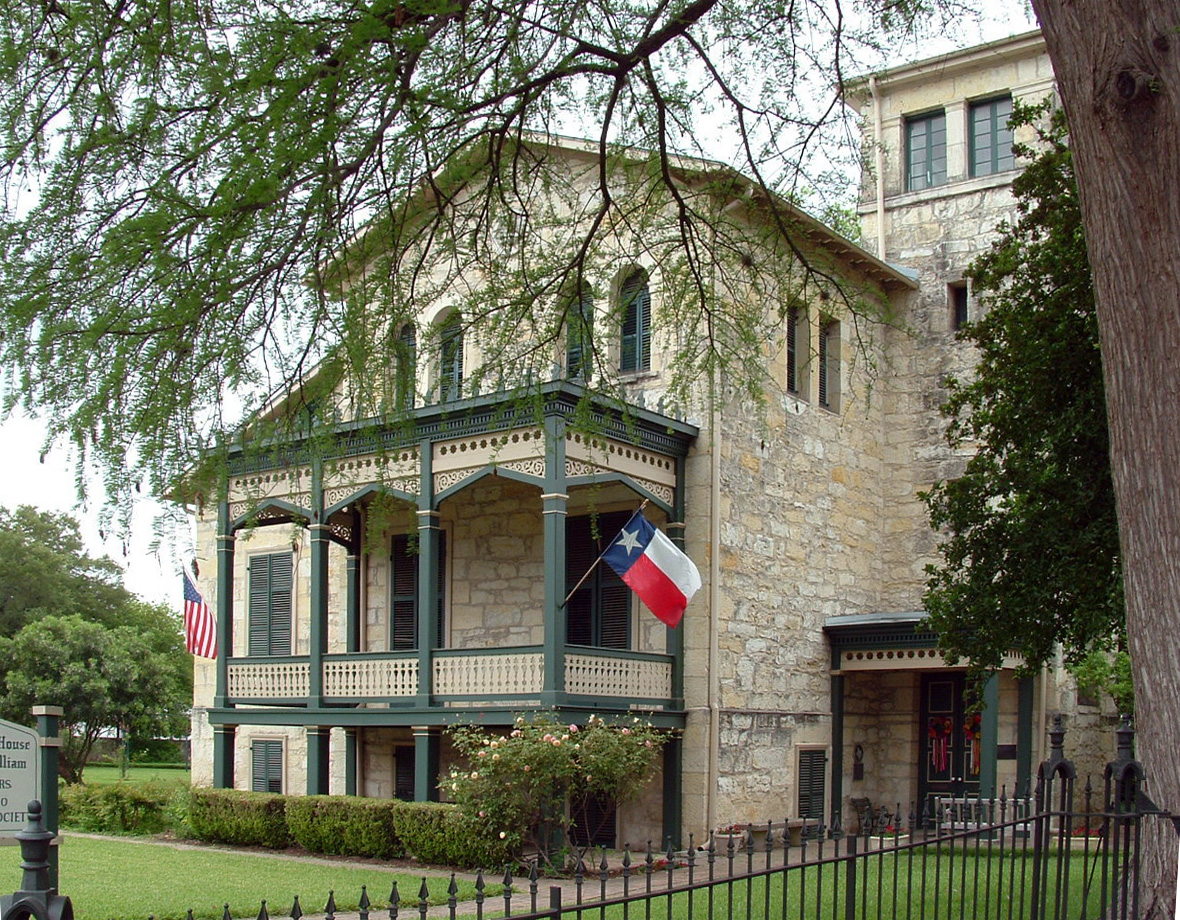
- Former Headquarters; Anton Wulff House
- Formation: March 22, 1924; 102 years ago
- Purpose: Historic preservation
- Location: 1146 South Alamo, San Antonio, Texas 78210
- Website: www.saconservation.org

The Conservation Society of San Antonio (legally incorporated as the San Antonio Conservation Society) is located in the Bexar County city of San Antonio in the U.S. state of Texas. Founding members were Emily Edwards, who became the organization's first president, and Rena Maverick Green. The organization was formed on March 22, 1924, and officially incorporated on July 8, 1925. Although now headquartered in the Courand House at 1146 South Alamo, The Society was previously headquartered in the Anton Wulff House, which they saved from destruction in 1974. The home was built 1869–1870 by German immigrant Anton Wulff, who became the city's first Park Commissioner.

== Purpose ==
The Conservation Society of San Antonio actively endeavors to educate the public about San Antonio's history through its structures. The Conservation Society has been responsible for saving many city structures from destruction. This includes several properties in La Villita and the King William Historic District which are owned, or have been owned, by the Society. At a cost of $325,000 in 1988, the Society had the Daniel J. Sullivan Stable and Carriage House, designed by Alfred Giles in 1896, re-assembled at the San Antonio Botanical Garden. The house re-opened in 1995 at the entrance to the garden.

== A Night in Old San Antonio ==
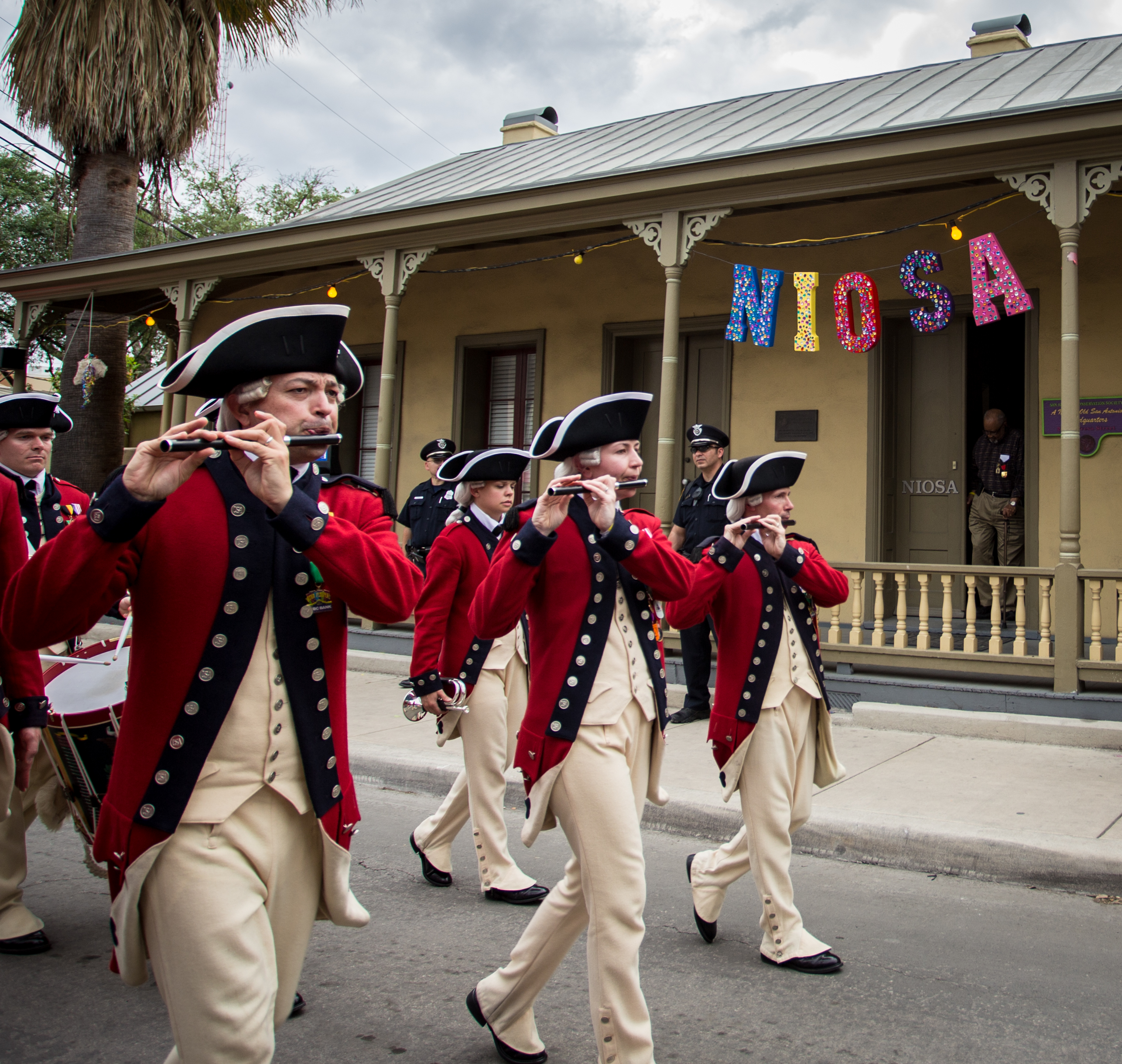
Old Guard Fife and Drum Corps performing at NIOSA

A Night in Old San Antonio (NIOSA) is the organization's annual event to raise funds for historic preservation within the city. The Conservation Society partners with the city to purchase and restore historic structures. The organization also awards restoration-rehabilitation grants to individuals and organizations. Since 2000, the festival has enabled the Society to award over $2 million in grants.

It had its beginning in 1936 as the Indian Harvest Festival. Held at the newly restored Mission San José, the original celebration centered on an historic recreation of the lives of the mission's Indians. In 1940, the event was transformed into the River Jubilee to celebrate the beautification of the San Antonio River. Joining the city's Fiesta San Antonio in 1945, Mary Vance Green was the chairperson in 1948 when the event was officially named A Night in Old San Antonio. That year, the theme had been the city under the Republic of Texas. The celebration had been a one-night event until 1954 when a second night was added. Two years later, SACS added a third night, and by 1958, it became a four-night event. Attendance realized 100,000 by 1976, and realized a profit exceeding $500,000 by 1985. It has attracted such large crowds that SACS has engaged the use of an armored truck to transport the event's money to the bank.

In 2012, the city of San Antonio granted a 10-year extension on their agreement with SACS, and an option for a second 10-year extension, to hold its annual NIOSA in La Villita.

== San Antonio River Walk ==
The Conservation Society was formed in 1924 when Emily Edwards and Remna Maverick Green united to fight the demolition of the Greek Revival Market House, a victim of street-widening throughout downtown. Popular legend has the Society involved in efforts to prevent channelization of the San Antonio River following the devastating flood of September 9, 1921. Area rain falls were recorded in above average amounts, up to 15 inches in one day northwest of the city. Los Olmos Creek breached its banks at 10 p.m., flooding Brackenridge Park. The Olmos flooding merged into the San Antonio River 30 minutes later, followed by rising waters from Martinez and Alazan creeks. Peaks in various areas ranged from five-to-eight feet, with losses of life and property. In the aftermath of the flooding, the city built the Olmos Dam in 1926 to help with future flood control. The recommendation from a city engineer called for draining and cementing over the part of the river that today is known as the San Antonio River Walk. A number of organizations joined with the City Federation of Women's Clubs to successfully stop the proposal. The Conservation Society was involved in efforts to conserve the natural beauty of the river, organizing a tour for city officials in November, 1924. In 1929, architect Robert H.H. Hugman presented the city and The Conservation Society with an idea for developing the area into a tourist-oriented arcade of shops. The arrival of the Great Depression ended the city's possible consideration of his proposal. However, the San Antonio River Beautification Committee later hired Hugman to develop the area with the Works Progress Administration. After initially supporting the plan, The Conservation Society in 1940 criticized Hugman's plan for its "excessive stone work." The River Project Board fired Hugman. The WPA finished the River Walk in 1941, and turned it over to the city.

== San Antonio Missions National Historical Park ==
What is currently the San Antonio Missions National Historical Park is the result of years of efforts involving The Conservation Society and other entities. The Society's involvement began in the 1920s, when they started working with the United States government to preserve the old missions. Between 1926 and 1931, SACS purchased the granary at Mission San José, and worked with the Works Progress Administration (WPA) to restore it, deeding it over to the state of Texas in 1941. SACS also purchased the "Huisache Bowl" gravel pit adjoining Mission San José, and the WPA transformed it into an amphitheater. SACS deeded it over to the State Parks Board in 1940. Renamed the Texas State Historical Theater under Governor Price Daniel, the property was deeded over to the National Park Service in 1983. In 1937, SACS purchased 1.5 acres of the Espada Aqueduct, and in 1978 deeded it to the San Antonio River Authority as part of a flood control project. In 1957, SACS purchased 25 acres of pecan grove in Acequia Park as a land preservation effort. Along with other landowners in 1962, they won a water flow and water rights lawsuit against the San Antonio River Authority. SACS's ownership was deeded to the City of San Antonio in 1975.

== See also ==
- National Register of Historic Places listings in Bexar County, Texas
