= King William Historic District =

- U.S. National Register of Historic Places
- U.S. Historic district
- Location within Texas Location within the United States
- Location: San Antonio, Texas
- Coordinates: 29°24′51″N 98°29′34″W
- Architect: Multiple
- NRHP reference No.: 72001349
- Added to NRHP: January 20, 1972

The King William Historic District of San Antonio, Texas was listed on the National Register of Historic Places listings in Bexar County, Texas on January 20, 1972. The area was originally used as farm acreage by the Spanish priests of the Misión San Antonio de Valero, and eventually parceled off for the local indigenous peoples of the area. In addition to residential homes, the district also includes the King William Park and Bandstand originally built in 1892 on the arsenal grounds, and later moved to its current location. Other features are the Upper Mill Park, the King William River Walk, and the Johnson Street pedestrian bridge.

The subdividing of the area into residential lots dates to 1853–66, coincided with the German diaspora in Texas. San Antonio by then was experiencing an influx of German immigrants, fueled in part by the German Adelsverein colonization efforts of the mid-19th century. Wilhelm Thielepape was one of those colonists, and served as Mayor of San Antonio 1867–1872. Surveyor Ernst Hermann Altgelt relocated to San Antonio in 1866, and built the first home in the area now known as the King William District. Being the first home builder in the area, he named it after King of Prussia William I, German Emperor. What eventually became a German enclave of the King William Historic District continued into the next generations. The 419 King William house was built in 1884 by Smith Ellis, but eventually sold to Otto Meusebach, the son of John O. Meusebach who led the Adelsverein colonization and founded the German town of Fredericksburg, Texas.

The King William Historic District evolved into more of an area for the financially successful, rather than any particular ethnicity. Louis Bergstrom was a successful businessman from Sweden. Several of the homes were designed by British architect Alfred Giles: the Carl Wilhelm August Groos House, the Edward Steves Homestead; Sartor House for jeweler Alexander Sartor Jr. Giles designed the Oge House for business leader and former Texas Ranger Louis Oge. The area was home to the United States Arsenal beginning in 1859. In 1985, the H-E-Bu grocery chain acquired ten acres for their corporation headquarters.

== Property listings ==
Residential homes of the King William Historic District
Property	Image	Address	Notes	Ref(s)
Ernst Altgelt House (1866)		236 King William	Ernst Altgelt (1832–1878) Düsseldorf immigrant who built the first home on King William Street, which he named after King of Prussia William I, German Emperor.	
Ernst Altgelt House (1878)		226 King William	Second house build by Ernst Altgelt. RTHL 5029000134	
John Ball House	John Ball House	120 King William	Built by French immigrant brothers John and Jack Ball.	
Joseph Ball House		116 King William	Built by French immigrant brothers John and Jack Ball.	
Albert Beckmann House		222 E. Guenther	San Antonio architect Albert Beckmann also designed many of the city's commercial buildings.	
Louis Bergstrom House and Cottage		208 and 210 King William	Built 1882–83 by Swedish cotton-wool-hides merchant Louis Bergstrom	
August Biesenbach House		528 King William	RTHL 5507018355	
Blersch-Watson House		213 Washington	Built 1859 for Gustav Blersch	
Blondin House		112 King William	Built 1905	
Henry Boerner House		326 King William	Built 1915	
Elias and Lucy Edmonds House		419 King William	RTHL 5507015407	
Ellis-Meusebach House		414 King William	Built 1884	
Gus Froebel House		525 Madison	Built 1890	
Martin Froebel House		228 Washington	Texas-German Vernacular style	
Alfred Giles House (306 King William)		306 King William	Both 306 and 308 built 1883 as "twin houses" for Alfred Giles, who was a British-born architect responsible for designing many courthouses, homes and buildings in Texas.	
Alfred Giles House (308 King William)		308 King William	Both 306 and 208 built 1883 as "twin houses" for Alfred Giles.	
Carl Griesenbeck House		506 Madison	Built 1909 for Confederate emissary Carl Griesenbeck	
Carl Wilhelm August Groos House		335 King William	RTHL 5029002287	
Gustav Groos House		231 Washington	Built 1875	
Carl H. Guenther House and Pioneer Flour Mills		205 E. Guenther Street	NRHP 2090001539, RTHL5029004808	
H.E.B. Corporate Headquarters - United States Arsenal Site				
Carl Harnisch House		523 King William	Built 1884	
Robert Hanschke House		225 King William	Built 1880	
Adolph Heusinger House		317 King William	Built 1883–85	
Charles Hummel House		309 King William	Built 1884	
Johnson Street Pedestrian Bridge				
Joseph House (San Antonio)				
Alexander Joske House		241 King William	Built 1900	
George Kalteyer House		425 King William	Built 1892	
Johanna Kalteyer House		332 King William	Built 1907	
William Kalteyer House		514 Madison	Built 1895 f	
King William Park and Bandstand				
McDaniel Carriage House		130 King William	Built 1896/1972 for Dr. and Mrs. Alfred McDaniel	
Mitchell-Ogg House		202 Washington	Built 1857–1892 for Newton A. Mitchell and Louis Oge	
J. M. Nix Houses		432 and 434 King William	Built 1900 for the builder of Nix Medical Center	
Norton-Polk-Mathis House		401 King William	RTHL 5029003615	
Max L. Oppenheimer House		316 King William	Built 1900	
Aaron Pancoast Sr. House		203 King William	Built 1891	
Josiah Pancoast House & Cottage		404 and 410 King William	Built 1878–1900	
San Antonio River Walk				
William Sanger House		242 King William	Built 1906-06	
Alexander Sartor, Jr. House		217 King William	Built 1882	
Herman Scuchard House		221 E. Guenther	Built in 1892	
John J. Stevens House		303 King William	Built for San Antonio postmaster John J. Stevens. Later sold to Vinton Lee James	
Albert Steves House		504 King William	Designed by Alfred Giles	
Albert Steves Carriage House		505 Madison	Converted from stable and carriage house to residence ca.1925	
Edward Steves Homestead		509 King William	Edward Steves Sr. house	
Edward Steves Jr. House		431 King William	Built 1884	
Adolph Wagner House		219 E. Guenther	Built 1885	
Ike West Home		422 King William	Built 1887	
Anton Wulff House		107 King William	Saved in 1974 by the San Antonio Conservation Society	
Unknown		325 King William	1940s Art Moderne home currently on property	

52 properties (or 53 if Ball houses counted separately)

== See also ==
- National Register of Historic Places listings in Bexar County, Texas

== Bibliography ==
- "NRHP King William Historic District – Atlas Number 2072001349". Texas Historic Sites Atlas. Texas Historical Commission.
- "TSHA | King William Historic District". www.tshaonline.org.
- "King William". www.sanantonio.gov. City of San Antonio.
