= Norton–Polk–Mathis House =

Historic house in Texas, United States

- U.S. Historic district – Contributing property
- Recorded Texas Historic Landmark
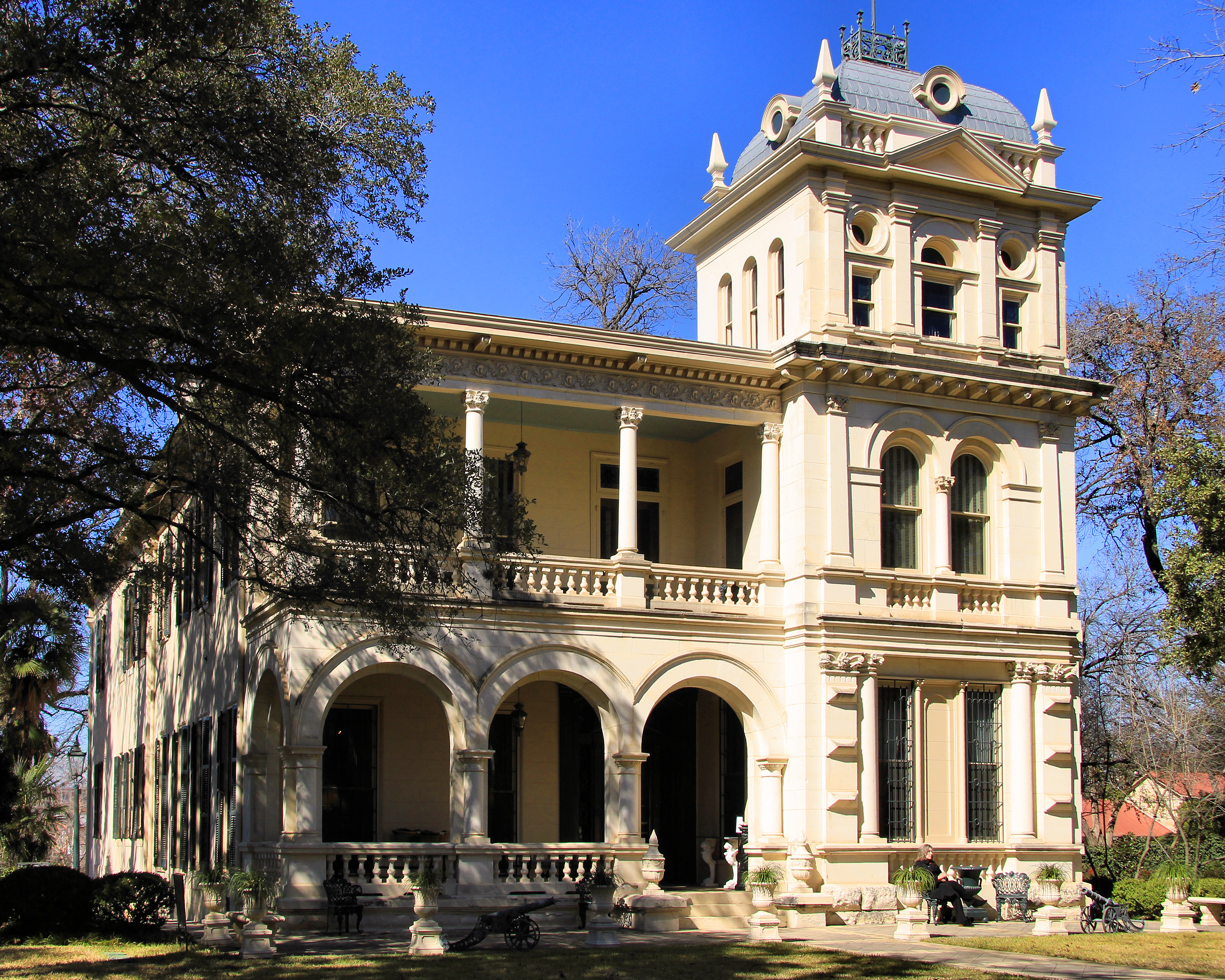
- Norton–Polk–Mathis House in 2014

- Location within Texas Location within the United States
- Interactive map showing the location of Norton-Polk-Mathis House
- Location: 401 King William St., San Antonio, Texas
- Coordinates: 29°24′50″N 98°29′39″W
- Built: 18761898
- Built by: Russel C. Norton, Edwin Polk, Ike T. Pryor
- Architectural style: Italianate (facade and tower)
- Website: Villa Finale: Museum & Gardens
- Part of: King William Historic District (ID72001349)
- RTHL No.: 3615

Significant dates
- Added to NRHP: January 20, 1972
- Designated CP: January 20, 1972
- Designated RTHL: 1971

The Norton–Polk–Mathis House, officially known as Villa Finale Museum & Gardens, is a historic house at 401 King William St. in San Antonio, Texas, United States. The house and its collection of 12,850 objects were donated to the National Trust for Historic Preservation in 2004, which operates the property as a museum. Villa Finale, which opened to the public in 2010, has 6,500 square feet. It was the first National Trust Historic Site in Texas. The home was named by its donor, Walter Nold Mathis (1919-2005), who became an eminent preservationist, both in the immediate King William neighborhood of San Antonio, and in other cities within Texas. Photographs and a virtual tour of the museum are available through Google Arts & Culture.

== The House ==
The house was built in four stages. Local merchant Russel C. Norton began construction on the house in 1876, which originated as a single story dwelling with four rooms, to which he subsequently added a second story. Other owners included rancher Edwin Polk and cattleman Ike T. Pryor. Polk, who bought the property in 1882, erected a two story addition in the rear of equal size. Pryor added the Italianate facade and tower, designed by James Wahrenberger, in 1898.

The property had a number of short term owners. Billy Keilman has been called "its most colorful owner." He used the basement for moonshining, while his wife operated a bordello upstairs. He bought the house in 1924, but met a violent end in 1925. A former lawman, Keilman was, among other things, the publisher of a guide called The Blue Book: For Visitors, Tourists and Those Seeking a Good Time While in San Antonio, Texas, which rated the establishments in San Antonio's red light district.

The neighborhood had declined following a severe flood in 1921. The building served as a boarding house in 1967, when Mathis, who was forced to move due to the construction of a highway, purchased it, with the encouragement of architect O'Neil Ford.

== Mathis as Preservationist ==
Mathis spent two years restoring the house he had named Villa Finale because it was to be his last home. It was the first significant restoration project in the neighborhood. When an undertaker planned to buy a nearby house, Mathis helped to purchase it for the San Antonio Conservation Society. He also bought neighboring distressed houses. “When Mathis moved to King WIlliam, he became a one-man restoration movement,” says Sylvia M. Gonzalez-Pizaña, Deputy Director & Curator of Villa Finale. “He needed to protect the neighborhood in order to protect his own property.” He then purchased fourteen other homes in the King William neighborhood, restored them and sold them to others whom he hoped would continue to preserve them.

Villa Finale was designated a Recorded Texas Historic Landmark in 1971. It is a contributing property to the King William Historic District, listed on the National Register of Historic Places, and it remains the only National Trust Historic Site in Texas. According to Texas Time Travel, Mathis "is widely recognized as the catalyst for the revitalization of the King William neighborhood, now a National Register Historic District."

Mathis, who contributed to other conservation efforts in San Antonio as well as Austin and Rockport, was the recipient of many heritage awards in Texas. He also won the National Trust’s highest award: the DuPont Crowninshield Award.

== The Collection ==
Mathis's interest in collecting was inspired by a book on Napoleon that he read when he was 11 years old. His taste was wide-ranging. His early collections included "shaving mugs, perfume bottles, swords, and pocket watches," and he branched out from there. According to Gonzalez-Pizaña, Mathis enjoyed “the hunt,” and he appreciated objects that were overlooked, “things that told stories.”

His favorite collecting area was Napoleana, and Mathis accumulated over 800 works related to Napoleon, including a bronze cast of his death mask. Most objects in the collection are 19th-20th century, and are from Europe or the US, though he also collected small Mexican retablos and larger, earlier paintings from the school of Cusco.

According to San Antonio Tourist, "Mathis left plenty for visitors to peruse: Napoleonic memorabilia... snuff and match boxes; letter openers; Greek and Russian religious items; sterling silver coffee and tea sets; pewter plates, mugs and serving pieces... bronze statues; Italian paintings; more than 2,000 books; English Wedgwood; and on and on. Mathis was definitely not a minimalist."

Mathis, who was a descendent of the last courier to leave the Alamo, put together a large collection of Texana, including prints of the Mexican-American War, maps of Texas and Mexico, and Texian campaign ceramics. He also collected prints by Mary Bonner and landscapes by Julian and Robert Onderdonk (the former a famous painter of bluebonnets).

Mathis designed his own gardens. He salvaged several tall columns from his home in Monte Vista that had been demolished. Sometime in the 1980s he surmounted the columns with an iron dome of his own design. Villa Finale's garden walls feature several reliefs by Pompeo Coppini, who sculpted the Alamo's cenotaph.

All objects at Villa Finale remain where Mathis put them, with the exception of works in temporary exhibitions in the gallery within the visitor's center, which opened in 2025. The objects in the museum's collection constitute "approximately 20 percent of the collections owned by the National Trust."

== See also ==
- National Register of Historic Places listings in Bexar County, Texas
- Recorded Texas Historic Landmarks in Bexar County
