= Anton Wulff House =

Historic house in Texas, United States

- U.S. Historic district – Contributing property
- Recorded Texas Historic Landmark
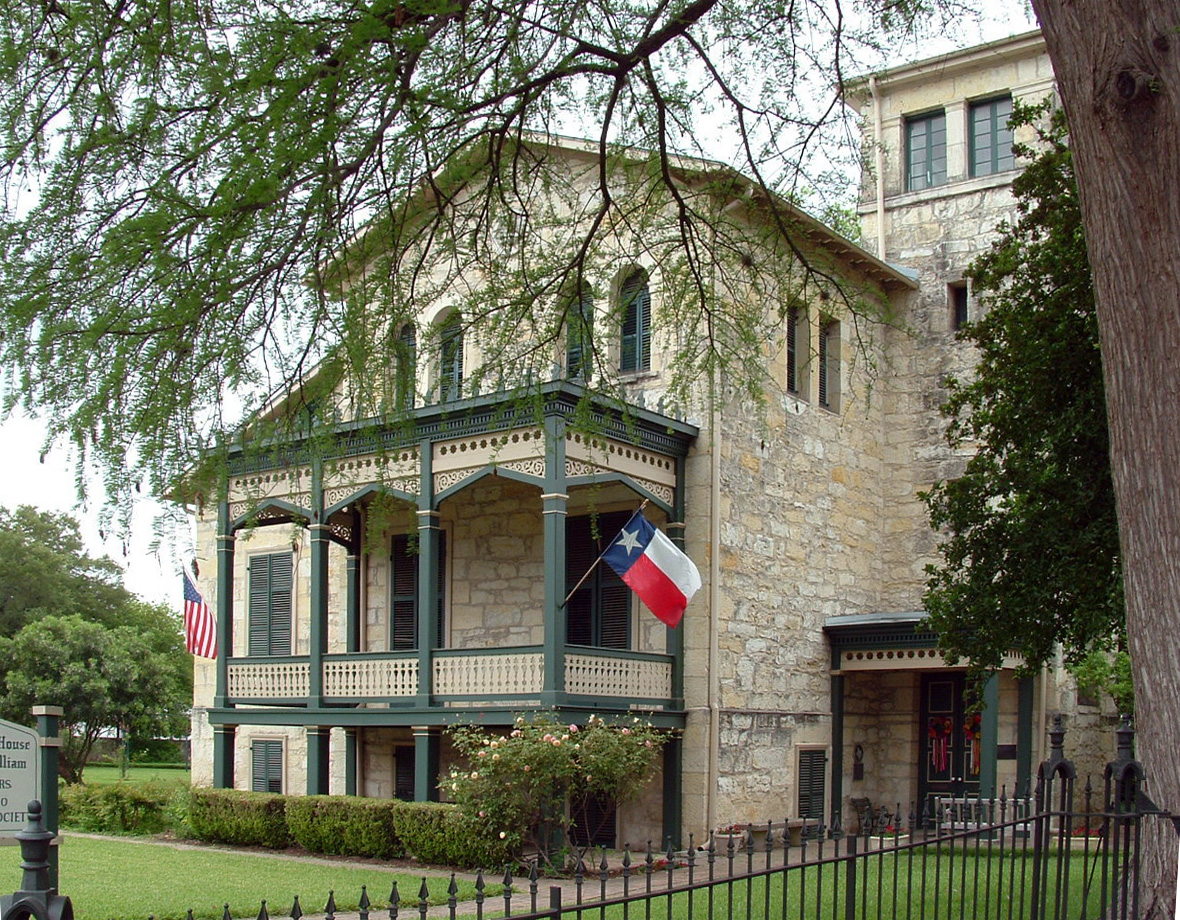
- Anton Wulff House in 2005

- Location within Texas Location within the United States
- Location: 107 King William St., San Antonio, Texas
- Coordinates: 29°25′4″N 98°29′27″W
- Part of: King William Historic District (ID72001349)
- RTHL No.: 5914

Significant dates
- Designated CP: January 20, 1972
- Designated RTHL: 1976

The Anton Wulff House is located in the San Antonio, Bexar County, Texas. The house has been designated a Recorded Texas Historic Landmark; and is listed on the National Register of Historic Places listings in Bexar County, Texas (NRHP). Wulff House was the headquarters of the San Antonio Conservation Society from 1975 to 2022. The original occupant who commissioned its construction was German immigrant and businessman Anton Wulff. He was a city alderman, San Antonio's first park commissioner, and the man who designed the layout of the city's Alamo Plaza.

== House details ==
The multi-story Italianate limestone Anton Wulff House is at located at 107 King William Street in the King William Historic District in San Antonio. It was built 1869–1870 on land originally owned by Pedro Huizar, and which was once part of San Antonio de Valero Mission. In 1902, the Wulff family sold the house to Arthur and Elise Guenther. In the 19th century, the property included a boathouse and a bathhouse. Flooding in 1921 resulted in a 1926 flood-control measure that included re-routing part of the San Antonio River. Prior to that, the Wulff house was adjacent to the river.

After a 1950 sale to F. G. and Kathryn Antonio, the structure was converted into individual apartments. Later, the United Brotherhood of Carpenters and Joiners remodeled the house after they purchased the structure; and in 1968 it received a zoning exemption due to its inclusion in the King William District.

In 1974, the San Antonio Conservation Society (SACS) raised enough funds to purchase the home for $250,000, half of which came from the Sheerin Foundation. The Economic Development Administration provided a grant, 20% of which was matched by SACS's fund raising, to restore the home. In 1975, SACS moved its headquarters into the Wulff home. In honor of the property's original owner, an adjacent lot is named the Pedro Huizar Garden.

== Historic structure ==
The Wulff House was designated a Recorded Texas Historic Landmark in 1976. It is listed on the NRHP in Bexar County, Texas, as a contributing structure of the King William Historic District.

== Anton Wulff ==
Anton Friedrich Wulff (1822–1894) was a native of Hamburg, Germany, who immigrated to Texas in 1848. In 1852, he married San Antonio resident María Guadalupe Olivarri, whose ancestors were among the first Canary Islanders to arrive in the area in 1731. Wulff became a United States citizen in 1854. He clerked in retail stores briefly in San Antonio before opening his first dry-goods store in Fredericksburg. He expanded his business into Coke County, and into the border towns of Laredo and Presidio del Norte.

During the Civil War, Wulff supplied the military units on both sides of the conflict. As a result, Confederate States Army Lt. Colonel John Baylor declared Wulff a spy. Wulff sent his family to Germany for the duration of the war, and he moved to Mexico to wait it out.

Then he and his family returned to San Antonio, where he built his home. He became active in civic work, became the city's first park commissioner, and was elected a city alderman. Wulff designed the layout of Alamo Plaza. His love of horticulture led to his beautification of the plaza, much of it at his own expense. In gratitude, city business leaders presented him with an engraved gold-topped walking cane.

== See also ==
- National Register of Historic Places listings in Bexar County, Texas
- Recorded Texas Historic Landmarks in Bexar County
