= List of Recorded Texas Historic Landmarks (Anderson-Callahan) =

The following is an introductory partial list in a series of Recorded Texas Historic Landmarks (RTHLs) arranged by county as designated by the Texas Historical Commission and local county historical commissions in Texas. This initial page includes RTHLs in the following counties: Anderson, Andrews, Angelina, Aransas, Archer, Armstrong, Atascosa, Austin, Bailey, Bandera, Bastrop, Baylor, Bee, Bell, Bexar, Blanco, Borden, Bosque, Bowie, Brazoria, Brazos, Brewster, Briscoe, Brooks, Brown, Burleson, Burnet, Caldwell, Calhoun, and Callahan.

Recorded Texas Historic Landmarks listed by county
Anderson-Callahan • Cameron-Duval • Eastland-Gray • Grayson-Hudspeth • Hunt-Martin • Mason-Rusk • Sabine-Travis • Trinity-Zavala

KEY

Landmarks with multiple historic designations are colored according to their highest designation within the following hierarchy.

⁕ Listed individually on the National Register of Historic Places (NRHP) as a National Historic Landmark
⁂ Listed on the NRHP as a contributing property of a National Historic Landmark District
† Listed individually on the NRHP
‡ Listed as a contributing property of an NRHP Historic District
§ Listed individually as or as part of a State Historic Site
# Listed individually as or as part of a State Antiquities Landmark

== Anderson County ==
Registered Texas Historic Landmark	Image	Marker number	Physical address	Nearest city	Year designated	Description
Anderson County Courthouse†	More images	8732	500 N. Church St. 31°45′54″N 95°37′34″W	Palestine	1988	courthouse square, corner of Lacy and Church
Col. G. R. Howard House†‡	More images	8766	1011 N. Perry St. 31°46′11″N 95°37′34″W	Palestine	1966	1011 N. Perry St., Palestine
First Presbyterian Church†	More images	8751	410 Ave. A 31°45′45″N 95°37′44″W	Palestine	1966	
Frankston Railroad Depot		8756	159 W. Railroad St. 32°2′58″N 95°30′23″W	Frankston	1977	SH 155, Frankston
Hodges-Darsey House‡		8764	517 E. Hodges St. 31°46′15″N 95°37′36″W	Palestine	1973	517 E. Hodges St., Palestine
I & GN Hospital and Nurses' Quarters‡		8767	919 S. Magnolia St. 31°45′12″N 95°37′54″W	Palestine	1990	919 S. Magnolia St., Palestine
John Starr House		8815	US 287 / SH 19 N of CR 158 31°39′46″N 95°35′4″W	Elkhart	1968	State Highway 19
John and Laura Miller House		7159	3 mi. S on FM 19	Frankston	1999	3 miles south of Frankston on FM 19
Link House, The‡		8774	1003 Link St. 31°46′9″N 95°37′46″W	Palestine	1972	1003 Link St., Anderson
Mount Vernon African Methodist Episcopal Church†	More images	8782	913 E. Calhoun St. 31°46′5″N 95°37′22″W	Palestine	1986	913 E. Calhoun, Palestine
Palestine Carnegie Library†	More images	8788	502 N. Queen St. 31°45′48″N 95°38′4″W	Palestine	1970	502 N. Queen St., Palestine
Palestine High School†	More images	8790	400 Micheaux Ave. 31°45′29″N 95°37′38″W	Palestine	1986	400 Micheaux Ave., Palestine
Pennybacker-Campbell-Wommack House‡		8796	814 S. Sycamore St. 31°45′17″N 95°37′46″W	Palestine	1969	814 S. Sycamore at W. Angelina, Palestine
Pine Lodge Club House		8800	1.5 mi. S on FM 1817	Elkhart	1967	1.5 mi. SE of Elkhart on FM 1817
Sacred Heart Church†	More images	8806	401 W. Oak St. 31°45′45″N 95°38′4″W	Palestine	1964	401 W. Oak St. at Queen, Palestine
Seven Oaks (Mallard-Alexander House)‡	More images	7158	407 E. Kolstad St. 31°46′5″N 95°37′41″W	Palestine	1966	
The Bowers Mansion‡		8739	301 S. Magnolia St. 31°45′36″N 95°37′59″W	Palestine	1973	301 S. Magnolia St.
William and Caroline Broyles House†		8820	1305 S. Sycamore St. 31°44′52″N 95°37′44″W	Palestine	1989	

== Andrews County ==
Registered Texas Historic Landmark	Image	Marker number	Physical address	Nearest city	Year designated	Description
"C" Ranch House		3	FM 1788 10 mi. N of SH 158 32°11′41″N 102°20′32″W	Andrews	1966	From Andrews, 10 mi. from SH 158/FM 1788 intersection; private access
Irwin Ranch House		2653	FM 1967 7 mi. W of US 385 32°24′11″N 102°41′16″W	Andrews	1967	From Andrews, take U.S. 385 north about 7 miles, then go west on FM 1967 about 7 miles.

== Angelina County ==
Registered Texas Historic Landmark	Image	Marker number	Physical address	Nearest city	Year designated	Description
Collins-Shotwell House†		6987	503 N. Raguet St. 31°20′30″N 94°44′8″W	Lufkin	1992	
Gibbs House†		7001	156 Grimes-Flournoy Rd. 31°8′30″N 94°32′26″W	Huntington vicinity	1993	10 miles south of Huntington on FM 844
Kurth Home†	More images	8707	1860 Old Mill Rd. 31°21′30″N 94°44′53″W	Lufkin vicinity	1964	on US 69 in Keltys, one mile north of Lufkin
Masonic Hall		18004	228 Leach St. 31°21′14″N 94°43′39″W	Lufkin	2014	
The Gann House	More images	6999	Off SH 94 near Neches River	Lufkin vicinity	1970	near Hwy. 94, 7.5 mi west of Lufkin

== Aransas County ==
Registered Texas Historic Landmark	Image	Marker number	Physical address	Nearest city	Year designated	Description
Baldwin-Brundrett House		16918	1028 N. Live Oak St. 28°1′57″N 97°3′8″W	Rockport	2011	1028 N. Live Oak
Bracht House		16457	409 N. Magnolia St. 28°1′37″N 97°3′6″W	Rockport	2010	
Fulton-Bruhl House		2084	409 Broadway St. 28°1′36″N 97°3′0″W	Rockport	1988	409 N. Broadway, Rockport.
Fulton Mansion†§#	More images	2083	317 S. Fulton Beach Rd. 28°3′27″N 97°2′5″W	Rockport	1964	Fulton Mansion State Historic Site. Corner of Henderson and Fulton Beach Road, Fulton
Hoopes-Smith House†		2557	417 Broadway St. 28°1′37″N 97°2′59″W	Rockport	1989	417 N. Broadway, Rockport.
Hynes-Balthrope House		18105	801 S. Church St. 28°1′5″N 97°3′21″W	Rockport	2015	
Joe A. and Bertha Harper House		17584	811 N. Live Oak St. 28°1′50″N 97°3′10″W	Rockport	2013	
Mathis House†	More images	3256	621 S. Church St. 28°1′12″N 97°3′18″W	Rockport	1989	621 S. Church Street, Rockport.
Moore House		13692	413 S. Church St. 28°1′18″N 97°3′16″W	Rockport	2006	413 S. Church Street
Richard Henry Wood House		19965	203 N. Magnolia St. 28°1′29″N 97°3′6″W	Rockport	2018	
Rockport School	More images	13653	619 N. Live Oak St. 28°1′43″N 97°3′11″W	Rockport	2006	619 N Live Oak St
Smith-Brundrett House		18009	901 N. Austin St. 28°1′51″N 97°3′3″W	Rockport	2014	West side of N. Austin Street between Orleans and Cedar Streets at 901 N. Austin, Rockport, Texas, Aransas County
Sorenson-Stair Building		15535	406 S. Austin St. 28°1′16″N 97°3′4″W	Rockport	2008	406 S. Austin
Woman's Club of Aransas County		15786	1104 E. Concho St. 28°1′34″N 97°2′59″W	Rockport	2009	
Wood-Jackson House		17218	701 N. Magnolia St. 28°1′46″N 97°3′6″W	Rockport	2012	northeast corner of Magnolia and Nopal

== Archer County ==
Registered Texas Historic Landmark	Image	Marker number	Physical address	Nearest city	Year designated	Description
Archer County Courthouse†#		191	100 S. Center St. 33°35′42″N 98°37′31″W	Archer City	1963	Archer County Courthouse, Highway 79, Center Street, Archer City.
Archer County Discovery Well		192	100 S. Center St.; marker located at sidewalk leading to W courthouse entrance 33°35′43″N 98°37′32″W	Archer City	1967	Courthouse lawn, SH 79 and Center Street, Archer City.

== Armstrong County ==
Registered Texas Historic Landmark	Image	Marker number	Physical address	Nearest city	Year designated	Description
Warner Memorial Community Center		5720	400 Vine St. 35°6′28″N 101°22′0″W	Claude	1962	400 Vine Street, Claude.

== Atascosa County ==
Registered Texas Historic Landmark	Image	Marker number	Physical address	Nearest city	Year designated	Description
Old Rock Baptist Church		3795	Old Rock Road 0.3 mi. S of Roseville Rd. 29°11′27″N 98°40′49″W	Somerset	1971	Old Rock Road; From Somerset take FM 2790 to Rossville Road. Turn left on Rossville Road, then right onto Old Rock Road. The church and cemetery are located about .25 miles on right.

== Austin County ==
Registered Texas Historic Landmark	Image	Marker number	Physical address	Nearest city	Year designated	Description
Austin County Jail†	More images	244	36 S. Bell St. 29°56′58″N 96°15′27″W	Bellville	1976	
Bellville Turnverein Pavilion		11703	966 E. Main St. 29°56′46″N 96°14′49″W	Bellville	1996	on East Main Street (FM 529), Bellville
E. O. Finn Building		6349	301 E. Main St. 29°56′58″N 96°15′19″W	Bellville	1982	
Hackbarth Building		17788	111 & 113 Main St. 29°46′54″N 96°9′20″W	Sealy	2013	Sealy, 111-113 Main Street
Harigel House, The		2378	104 S. Bell St. 29°56′57″N 96°15′28″W	Bellville	1984	
Haynes-Felcman House		11701	305 Hardeman St. 29°46′49″N 96°9′36″W	Sealy	1999	at the intersection of Hardeman and Main streets
Hess-Kollatschny Farm House		2465	14992 Cherry Blossom Ln. 29°53′5″N 96°20′19″W	Cat Spring	1982	Roff Ranch, 2 miles from Cat Spring Agricultural Hall; MARKER REPORTED MISSING 5/2011
Hill House	More images	11704	256 PR 38 29°48′22″N 96°6′3″W	San Felipe	1962	On Park Road 38 just off FM 1458, San Felipe. Medallion may be missing.
Industry Methodist Church		14222	2131 Pilgrim Rest Ln. 29°58′27″N 96°30′20″W	Industry	1967	
John Bell Lewis Home		3079	232 S. Masonic St. 29°56′57″N 96°15′35″W	Bellville	1979	
John Reichle General Merchandise (Welcome Store)		2805	12528 FM 109 30°1′43″N 96°29′16″W	Industry	1992	from Industry, take FM 109 north about 4 miles
Joseph L. Leshikar House		1730	3373 Skalak Rd. 29°56′17″N 96°24′20″W	New Ulm	1965	Nelsonville-New Bremen Rd., 4.5 miles south of Nelsonville off SH 159 (private)
L. A. and Adelheid Machemehl House		3179	621 E. O'Bryant St. 29°56′34″N 96°15′17″W	Bellville	1992	
Lambert House		12402	153 Third St. 29°48′12″N 96°5′54″W	San Felipe	1962	Off FM 1438; MEDALLION REPORTED MISSING 5/2011
Lindemann-Ott House		16481	2207 Main St. 29°58′18″N 96°30′27″W	Industry	2010	
Magruder-Cannon-Bryan Home		3185	Leschper Rd. 29°55′56″N 96°16′27″W	Bellville	1982	S. Holland Street, Bellville
Old Roesler Place, The†		4336	12169 SH 159 W 29°58′32″N 96°26′15″W	Nelsonville	1977	From Nelsonville, take SH 159 west about 2 miles; private.
Paul and Mahala Hackbarth House	More images	2326	325 Sixth St. 29°46′41″N 96°9′28″W	Sealy	1991	
Pitts Place		11705	637 Antonio Martinez St. 29°48′22″N 96°6′9″W	San Felipe	1962	corner of Park Road 38 and Antonio Martinez St., San Felipe
Preibisch Building		12526	207 Main St. 29°46′53″N 96°9′24″W	Sealy	2001	corner of Main and Fowlkes streets
San Felipe Church		11706	3922 FM 1458 29°48′16″N 96°5′53″W	San Felipe	1962	FM 1458 at Park Road 38, San Felipe
San Felipe Town Hall	More images	4535	927 Sixth St. 29°48′0″N 96°5′47″W	San Felipe	1970	Sixth Street, 0.25 miles east of FM 1458, San Felipe. MARKER REPORTED MISSING 5/2011
Shelburne-Reinecker House		4666	402 S. Masonic St. 29°56′49″N 96°15′40″W	Bellville	1994	
The Wesley Brethren Church†		8405	9643 Wesley Church Ln. 30°3′55″N 96°29′53″W	Wesley	1966	From Brenham, take FM 332 about 10 mi. SW to Wesley Church Rd., follow rd. 1/2 mi. E to church. Wesley is in Washington County but the church is in Austin County.
Waddell-Dudensing-Bering Home		5698	5323 Post Oak Point Rd. 29°55′43″N 96°31′35″W	New Ulm	1974	
Witte-Schmid House†		18687	2650 Witte-Schmid Rd. 30°0′7″N 96°33′38″W	Shelby	2017	near Shelby, TX FM 1457 off of State Highway 159

== Bailey County ==
Registered Texas Historic Landmark	Image	Marker number	Physical address	Nearest city	Year designated	Description
Cookhouse - Muleshoe Ranch		3531	2000 W. Ash Ave. 34°14′20″N 102°44′47″W	Muleshoe	1965	Relocated to Muleshoe Heritage Complex 1986

== Bandera County ==
Registered Texas Historic Landmark	Image	Marker number	Physical address	Nearest city	Year designated	Description
Bandera County Courthouse	More images	291	504 Main St. 29°43′36″N 99°4′21″W	Bandera	1972	504 Main Street (Highway 16)
Bandera County Jail†#	More images	3755	End of 12th St. SE of Cypress St. 29°43′30″N 99°4′9″W	Bandera	1965	One block southeast of SH 16, Bandera.
Bandera Methodist Church		292	406 11th St. 29°43′30″N 99°4′23″W	Bandera	1967	Corner of Eleventh and Hackberry Sts., Bandera.
Bandera's First Bank		294	315 11th St. 29°43′27″N 99°4′21″W	Bandera	1965	Corner of Cedar Street and Eleventh, Bandera.
Benjamin Franklin and Mary Hay Langford, Jr. Home†	More images	12931	415 14th St. 29°43′41″N 99°4′12″W	Bandera	2002	407 Fourteenth St
First Bandera County Courthouse†#	More images	1599	End of 12th St. SE of Cypress St. 29°43′29″N 99°4′9″W	Bandera	1979	County agricultural offices, one block southeast of Highway 16, next to old jail, Bandera.
Hix Ranch House		2500	Windmill Dr. N of FM 3240 29°47′57″N 99°9′34″W	Bandera vicinity	1965	From Bandera, take FM 3240 about 8 miles northwest to Ranch entrance, south side of road, just before junction with FM 2828.
Jureczki House†		2890	607 Cypress St. 29°43′13″N 99°4′31″W	Bandera	1964	Northwest corner of Seventh and Cypress, Bandera.
Old Buck Ranch		3694	Wharton's Dock Rd. at San Julian Creek 29°41′48″N 99°3′1″W	Bandera vicinity	1966	From Bandera, take FM 689 SE about 1 mile to Wharton's Dock Rd. & follow east about 2 miles to San Julian Creek. (Pass Flying L. Ranch)
Old English-Crist House		3725	3 mi. S of Pipe Creek on FM 1283	Pipe Creek vicinity	1968	From Pipe Creek, take FM 1283 South about 3 mile (house is just before Bottle Creek Rd.)
Old Huffmeyer Store		3750	301 Main St. 29°43′28″N 99°4′16″W	Bandera	1967	Corner of Main Street and Cypress, Bandera.
Old Stanard Home		3820	E edge of town on SH 16 29°47′48″N 99°14′20″W	Medina	1965	Hwy. 16, E city limits, Medina
Pilot's Lounge at Bandera Airpark		18353	141 Airport Rd. 29°42′50″N 99°2′45″W	Bandera	2016	
Polly's Chapel	More images	4067	359 Polly's Chapel Rd. 29°46′26″N 98°59′26″W	Bandera vicinity	1965	From Bandera, take SH 16 about 8 miles northeast to Privilege Creek Bridge. Go north on County Road about 3 miles to Polly's Chapel.
Schmidtke-Callahan House	More images	4601	285 SH 16 29°43′35″N 99°4′7″W	Bandera	1981	Corner of Cypress (SH 16) and Main, Bandera.
Spettel Riverside House		5008	Off Spettel Rd. in Bandera County Park 29°43′35″N 99°4′7″W	Lakehills	1981	Off Park Road 37, Lakehills. Take Ten Thousand Trails Road to recreational area, house is just inside gates - here road changes to Spettel Road.
St. Stanislaus Catholic Church		5081	300 Seventh St. 29°43′15″N 99°4′31″W	Bandera	1962	
St. Stanislaus Convent and First Catholic School	More images	5082	302 Seventh St. 29°43′17″N 99°4′31″W	Bandera	1975	Corner of Seventh Street and Cedar Street, Bandera.

== Bastrop County ==
Registered Texas Historic Landmark	Image	Marker number	Physical address	Nearest city	Year designated	Description
Aldridge-Fitzwilliam Home		9146	1 mi. S on SH 304 from SH 21 / SH 71	Bastrop	1968	2 mi. W off highway 204
Allen-Fowler House†	More images	15623	1404 Wilson St. 30°6′55″N 97°19′22″W	Bastrop	2008	
B. D. Orgain House	More images	9215	1508 Church St. 30°6′59″N 97°19′18″W	Bastrop	1981	1508 Church St., Bastrop
Bastrop Christian Church‡		9150	1106 Church St. 30°6′43″N 97°19′17″W	Bastrop	1965	New England Victorian architecture design
Bastrop County Courthouse†#	More images	9153	804 Pecan St. 30°6′33″N 97°19′5″W	Bastrop	1964	Courthouse Square, Pine/Walnut/Pecan/Water streets, Bastrop
Bastrop County Jail†#	More images	9154	801 Pine St. 30°6′33″N 97°19′7″W	Bastrop	1977	Corner of Pine and Waters Streets, Bastrop
Bastrop Opera House‡	More images	9158	711 Spring St. 30°6′41″N 97°19′10″W	Bastrop	1984	711 Spring St., Bastrop
Burger Home‡		9162	703 Farm St. 30°6′45″N 97°19′11″W	Bastrop	1979	703 Farm St., Bastrop
Calvary Episcopal Church‡		9167	605 Spring St. 30°6′41″N 97°19′15″W	Bastrop	1962	Spring Street, Bastrop
Chancellor House‡		9170	201 Ramona St. 30°0′30″N 97°9′40″W	Smithville	1994	201 Ramona, Smithville
Crocheron-McDowall House†	More images	9174	1502 Wilson St. 30°6′58″N 97°19′22″W	Bastrop	1996	1502 Wilson, Bastrop
D. O. Hill House‡		9197	502 Olive St. 30°0′36″N 97°9′26″W	Smithville	1962	502 Olive St., Smithville
Dr. I. B. Nofsinger House‡	More images	9214	310 N. Main St. 30°21′1″N 97°22′19″W	Elgin	1982	310 N. Main St., Elgin
Dr. Sayers' Office‡		7162	1003 Main St. 30°6′39″N 97°19′11″W	Bastrop	1968	1003 Main St., Bastrop
Elgin Methodist Church		9182	216 W. Third St. 30°21′0″N 97°22′25″W	Elgin	1988	216 W. 3rd St., Elgin
First Christian Church (Disciples of Christ) of Smithville‡		9186	400 Burleson St. 30°0′29″N 97°9′21″W	Smithville	1979	4th and Burleson, Smithville
First Methodist Church of Smithville‡		9187	400 Olive St. 30°0′32″N 97°9′28″W	Smithville	1988	corner of Olive and 4th St.
Governor Sayers House†	More images	9226	1703 Wilson St. 30°7′4″N 97°19′20″W	Bastrop	1971	1703 Wilson St.
H. P. Luckett House†	More images	16996	1402 Church St. 30°6′54″N 97°19′18″W	Bastrop	2011	1402 Church St., Bastrop
Haralson House†		9193	1006 Chestnut St. 30°6′39″N 97°18′57″W	Bastrop	1963	1006 Chestnut St., Bastrop
Hartford Jenkins Home†		9200	1302 Pecan St. 30°6′50″N 97°19′4″W	Bastrop	1971	1302 Pecan St., Bastrop
Henry N. Bell House†		9160	1408 Church St. 30°6′57″N 97°19′18″W	Bastrop	1962	1408 Church St., Bastrop
Hopewell Rosenwald School†	More images	23683	690 Hwy 21 West 30°5′55″N 97°27′41″W	Cedar Creek	2022	
Hubbard - Trigg House†		9198	1508 Pecan St. 30°7′0″N 97°19′4″W	Bastrop	1964	1508 Pecan St., Bastrop
Jung - Pearcy House†		9203	909 Pecan St. 30°6′38″N 97°19′2″W	Bastrop	1964	909 Pecan St., Bastrop
Kesselus Building‡		9204	912 Main St. 30°6′35″N 97°19′13″W	Bastrop	1985	912 Main St., Bastrop
Kleinert Building‡	More images	13158	910 Main St. 30°6′35″N 97°19′13″W	Bastrop	2003	Bastrop, 910 Main Street
Kleinert - Hoppe House†		9205	806 Jefferson St. 30°6′32″N 97°18′59″W	Bastrop	1990	806 Jefferson St., Bastrop
Leshikar House†		18896	301 Mills Street 30°0′22.5″N 97°9′14″W	Smithville	2018	301 Mills St, Smithville
Margaret Chambers Home†		9169	502 Elm St. 30°7′9″N 97°19′20″W	Bastrop	1962	502 Elm St., Bastrop
Meeks - Maynard Cabin		9210	8 mi. S on Upper Elgin River Rd. 30°15′53″N 97°26′21″W	Elgin	1965	8 mi. south of Elgin on CR 127, upper Elgin River Rd.
Miller - Gillum House	More images	9211	100 N. Ave. B 30°20′53″N 97°22′23″W	Elgin	1987	
Mina - Bastrop Pioneers Home†		9212	1005 Hill St. 30°6′41″N 97°18′54″W	Bastrop	1964	1005 Hill, Bastrop
Mt. Olive Baptist Church		14151	250 Mt. Olive Rd. 30°6′18″N 97°25′46″W	Bastrop	2008	
Murray Burleson Home‡		9164	207 NE Eighth St. 30°0′45″N 97°9′22″W	Smithville	1962	207 E. 8th St., Smithville
Old Bastrop Academy Bell		9149	1201 Main St. 30°6′47″N 97°19′10″W	Bastrop	1966	1201 N. Main St., Bastrop
Old Cornelson-Fehr House†		9173	702 Main St. 30°6′26″N 97°19′11″W	Bastrop	1967	702 S. Main St., Bastrop
Old Jenkins Home†		9201	1710 Main St. 30°7′8″N 97°19′14″W	Bastrop	1964	1710 N. Main St., Bastrop
P. O. Elzner House†		9183	802 Main St. 30°6′31″N 97°19′12″W	Bastrop	1976	802 S. Main St., Bastrop
Pfeiffer Home†		9218	1802 Main St. 30°7′9″N 97°19′14″W	Bastrop	1978	1802 Main St., Bastrop
R. L. Perkins Home†		9217	1307 Church St. 30°6′52″N 97°19′16″W	Bastrop	1965	1307 Church St., Bastrop
Rabb House‡		12765	401 Colorado St. 30°0′47″N 97°9′12″W	Smithville	2002	401 Colorado Street
Richard J. and Annie Brieger House†		9161	1508 Hill St. 30°7′0″N 97°18′55″W	Bastrop	1994	1508 Hill St., Bastrop
Rock Front Saloon, 1870	More images	9222	557 Old Hwy. 20 30°17′13″N 97°14′24″W	McDade	1963	in McDade, intersection of Loop 323 and US 290 on Main St. - in McDade Historical Museum
Scottie Chambliss Jenkins House†		9229	801 Pecan St. 30°6′31″N 97°19′2″W	Bastrop	1963	801 Pecan St., Bastrop
The A. A. Erhard Home†		9184	1205 Pecan St. 30°6′48″N 97°19′2″W	Bastrop	1963	1205 Pecan St. Marker reported missing May 2009.
Trigg Home (Henry E. McGehee House)		9234	5 mi. S on SH 304	Bastrop	1964	5 mi. S of Bastrop on FM 304
Wallace - Holme House		9237	907 Pine St. 30°6′34″N 97°19′0″W	Bastrop	1991	907 Pine St., Bastrop
White - Turner House†		9238	1307 Main St. 30°6′52″N 97°19′11″W	Bastrop	1983	1307 Main St., Bastrop
Wilbarger House†	More images	7161	1403 Main St. 30°6′55″N 97°19′12″W	Bastrop	1967	1403 N. Main St., Bastrop
Wiley Hill House†	More images	9195	Hills Prairie Rd. E of SH 304 30°2′53″N 97°18′28″W	Bastrop	1962	5 mi. S of Bastrop on SH 304 county road, cutoff to Hills Prairie
Yerge-Hill Family Home‡		9241	401 Main St. 30°0′35″N 97°9′33″W	Smithville	1965	400 Main St., Smithville

== Baylor County ==
Registered Texas Historic Landmark	Image	Marker number	Physical address	Nearest city	Year designated	Description
Early Community Building		1	200 N. East St. 33°35′21″N 99°15′32″W	Seymour	1969	S. East and E. Morris streets, Seymour
First Christian Church of Seymour		1717	401 N. East St. 33°35′29″N 99°15′34″W	Seymour	1970	401 N. East St., Seymour

== Bee County ==
Registered Texas Historic Landmark	Image	Marker number	Physical address	Nearest city	Year designated	Description
A. C. Jones Home		7126	611 E. Jones St. 28°24′46″N 97°44′50″W	Beeville	1967	611 E. Jones St., Beeville
Bee County Courthouse†#	More images	12317	105 W. Corpus Christi St. 28°24′4″N 97°44′53″W	Beeville	2000	
Beeville Post Office†		15808	111 N. St. Mary's St. 28°24′10″N 97°44′55″W	Beeville	2009	
Camp-Ezell House		683	1313 W. Flournoy St. 28°24′14″N 97°45′51″W	Beeville	1971	1313 W. Flournoy, Beeville
Cook Home		1050	E edge of town on private road	Beeville	1966	W. Cook 1001 St., Beeville
First Christian Church		1698	220 N. Commerce St. 28°37′13″N 97°48′4″W	Pettus	1965	Corner of Commerce and Walton streets, First Christian Church of Pettus.
George Home		2155	801 N. Adams St. 28°24′34″N 97°44′57″W	Beeville	1966	801 N. Adams, Beeville
Jim Little Homestead		2754	0.25 mi. S of FM 799 4 mi. W of town	Beeville	1966	W. Cadiz Rd., on private property
McClanahan House		3840	206 E. Corpus Christi St. 28°24′9″N 97°44′47″W	Beeville	1964	206 E. Corpus Christi St., Beeville
Medio Creek		3315	Marker located 0.2 mi. E of U.S. 59 bridge over Medio Creek 28°29′10″N 97°39′12″W	Beeville	1967	From Beeville, take US 59 about 4 mi NE to junction of US 59 & Medio Creek, then continue east O.2 mi.
Medio Creek Bridge†		3316	CR 241 over Medio Creek 28°31′46″N 97°47′39″W	Normanna	1987	From Normanna, take county road 241 about 1 mile west
Park Hotel		3936	US 181 N end of town 28°34′18″N 97°48′6″W	Tuleta	1994	US 181 North, Tuleta (private property)
Praeger Building†	More images	4104	110 W. Corpus Christi St. 28°24′6″N 97°44′57″W	Beeville	1981	110 W. Corpus Christi St., Beeville (Marker fales Washington St.)
Rialto Theater†	More images	13965	112-114 N. Washington St. 28°24′8″N 97°44′57″W	Beeville	2007	
Rountree Rock House		4364	6 mi. S on FM 1349 from U.S. 59 28°16′47″N 97°48′16″W	Beeville	1971	From Beeville, take US 59 west about 4 mi. Then go south on FM 1349 about 6 mi.
Saint Philip's Episcopal Church		4487	311 E. Corpus Christi St. 28°24′13″N 97°44′44″W	Beeville	1967	Corner of N. Adams and Corpus Christi Sts., Beeville
Thompson Building (First Brick Building on Square)		1692	108 W. Corpus Christi St. 28°24′7″N 97°44′56″W	Beeville	1971	108 W. Corpus Christi, Beeville
William E. Madderra Home		5824	401 N. Adams St. 28°24′23″N 97°44′50″W	Beeville	1983	401 N. Adams St.

== Bell County ==
Registered Texas Historic Landmark	Image	Marker number	Physical address	Nearest city	Year designated	Description
Anderson Place, Old†	More images	159	35 S. Main St. 30°56′46″N 97°32′12″W	Salado	1965	
Armstrong-Adams House†		205	2 N. Main St. 30°56′49″N 97°32′14″W	Salado	1985	Main and Thomas Arnold Streets, Salado.
Avenue D School†	More images	251	101 N. College St. 31°7′16″N 97°44′0″W	Killeen	1981	
Bell County Courthouse†‡#	More images	12460	101 E. Central Ave. 31°3′21″N 97°27′49″W	Belton	2000	Central Ave. at Main St.
Belton Farmers Co-op Gin†	More images	17122	219 S. East St. 31°3′18″N 97°27′45″W	Belton	2012	One block south east of the Belton Courthouse, backing up to the Nolan Creek
Berry-Vickrey House†		380	680 N. Main St. 30°57′4″N 97°32′11″W	Salado	1962	Horsefeathers (2007)
Bethel Primitive Baptist Church		391	400 S. Gray St. 31°6′51″N 97°43′46″W	Killeen	1990	
C. L. Walker Home		6491	1206 N. Third St. 31°6′34″N 97°20′20″W	Temple	1978	
Capt. Robert Bonner Halley Home†		2343	681 N. Main St. 30°57′15″N 97°31′57″W	Salado	1962	
Carnegie Library Building‡†	More images	733	201 N. Main St. 31°3′27″N 97°27′48″W	Belton	1981	
Christ Episcopal Church of Temple‡		842	300 N. Main St. 31°6′0″N 97°20′25″W	Temple	1976	NW corner of Calhoun & Main
Clark House†		905	520 S. Main St. 31°3′10″N 97°27′56″W	Belton	1982	
Dr. John S. and Mary McCelvey House		11728	804 N. 11th St. 31°6′22″N 97°20′40″W	Temple	1999	
Early Bell County Jail		1336	210 N. Pearl St. 31°3′29″N 97°27′53″W	Belton	1967	
Ele B. Baggett Home†		1445	1019 N. Main St. 31°3′57″N 97°27′36″W	Belton	1983	
Fellrath Building‡		1586	126 N. East St. 31°3′25″N 97°27′45″W	Belton	1984	corner of East and 1st
Ferguson Home†		1591	518 N. Seventh St. 31°6′12″N 97°20′36″W	Temple	1967	MARKER REPORTED MISSING 5/2011
First United Methodist Church of Belton		1882	205 N. East St. 31°3′31″N 97°27′42″W	Belton	1978	N. East St. at 3rd Ave, Belton
First United Methodist Church of Temple‡		1896	102 N. Second St. 31°5′52″N 97°20′24″W	Temple	1979	
Fowler House†		2044	1301 N. Stagecoach Rd. 30°57′30″N 97°31′58″W	Salado	1968	US 81, 1 mile north of Salado.
George Washington Baines House†		279†	316 Royal St. 30°56′31″N 97°31′59″W	Salado	1981	Royal Street, Salado.
Grace United Methodist Church		2237	601 S. Main St. 31°5′26″N 97°20′36″W	Temple	1983	
Home of Captain A. J. Harris†	More images	2527	1001 W. Tenth Ave. 31°4′2″N 97°28′9″W	Belton	1966	Corner of 10th and Harris Sts., Belton
James A. Fletcher House		1918	504 W. Nugent Ave. 31°6′44″N 97°20′27″W	Temple	1981	
John and Ettie Mayfield House		3268	400 W. Travis St. 30°52′49″N 97°24′26″W	Holland	1994	
Luther Memorial†	More images	13713	Vann Cir., University of Mary Hardin-Baylor 31°3′59″N 97°27′51″W	Belton	2004	University of Mary Hardin-Baylor campus, Vann Circle Drive
M. H. Denman Cabin	More images	3161	601 N. Main St. 30°57′5″N 97°32′4″W	Salado	1968	Behind Salado Civic Center at corner of Main and Van Bibber Sts., Salado
Major A.J. Rose House†		4349	101 Rose Way 30°56′26″N 97°31′46″W	Salado	1979	Corner of William Rose Way at Royal Street, Salado.
Maxdale Bridge		3263	Maxdale Rd. over of Lampasas River S of FM 2670 30°59′21″N 97°49′46″W	Killeen	1990	10 mi. S on SH 195, 3.7 mi. W on FM 2670, 0.3 mi. S on Maxdale Road, south side of bridge. Marker was stolen 2005; recovered and in possession of BCHC
Messer-Limmer Farmhouse		12391	1717 Eberhardt Rd. 31°7′18″N 97°21′28″W	Temple	1989	Texas Early Day Tractor and Engine Association grounds, Eberhardt Rd.; relocated to Temple from Bartlett area ca. 2006; former location=3.8 miles east of Bartlett on FM 487, then 1.6 miles south on Aubrey Messer Rd., then 0.6 miles north on drive to house
MKT of Texas Railway Passenger Depot		23306	620 Central Ave. 31°3′5″N 97°27′57″W	Temple	2021	
Muehlhause House		3524	620 S. Main St. 31°3′5″N 97°27′57″W	Belton	1994	Corner of S Main and Ave F
Norton-Orgain House†	More images	3614	7 N. Main St. 30°56′50″N 97°32′11″W	Salado	1991	Thomas Arnold and Main Streets, Salado.
Omar L. Fletcher Home		1919	1314 N. Ninth St. 31°6′41″N 97°20′29″W	Temple	1979	
Robertson Home†	More images	4305	646 S. Robertson Rd. 30°56′32″N 97°32′34″W	Salado	1967	on west side of IH-35, just south of Salado Creek, Salado
Salado Methodist Church†		4494	650 Royal St. 30°56′30″N 97°31′44″W	Salado	1969	relocated from corner of Stage Coach & Church Streets in 2005
Sanderford Log Cabin		4562	Paddy Hamilton Rd. near FM 93 31°4′38″N 97°32′19″W	Belton	1967	Private property near FM 93 and Paddy Hamilton Road
Stagecoach Inn†	More images	5091	401 S. Stagecoach Rd. 30°56′31″N 97°32′15″W	Salado	1962	Main Street (old US 81) at College Hill, Salado.
Steakley Home		5102	2207 Marlandwood Rd. 31°4′0″N 97°22′46″W	Temple	1964	2207 Marland Wood Road, Temple.
Stinnett's Mill		5123	10195 Stinnett Mill Rd. 30°57′48″N 97°30′8″W	Salado vicinity	1962	About 4.5 miles NE of Salado on Stinnett's Mill Rd via Rose Rd.
Summers' Mill		5147	FM 1123 at Salado Creek 30°58′13″N 97°25′59″W	Belton vicinity	1965	5 miles east of Belton on FM 1123 @ Salado Creek; MARKER REPORTED MISSING 5/2011
Temple Public Library‡		5223	101 N. Main St. 31°5′52″N 97°20′26″W	Temple	1978	former Temple Post Office building
The Curtis Mansion†		1137	1004 N. Main St. 31°3′56″N 97°27′38″W	Belton	1977	NW corner of N. Main & E. Tenth
Twelve Oaks†		5577	628 Center Cir. 30°56′45″N 97°31′55″W	Salado	1962	Center Circle, Salado
Wedemeyer House†		6108	404 E. Ninth Ave. 31°3′49″N 97°27′28″W	Belton	1975	MARKER REPORTED MISSING 5/2011

== Bexar County ==
Registered Texas Historic Landmark	Image	Marker number	Physical address	Nearest city	Year designated	Description
Acequia Madre de Valero (Main Irrigation Ditch of Valero Mission)‡	More images	78	HemisFair Park, 434 S. Alamo St. 29°25′9″N 98°29′11″W	San Antonio	1968	Log in Hemis Fair Plaza, S. Alamo St., San Antonio
Aldrete Houses‡	More images	13326	526 E. Nueva St. 29°25′14″N 98°29′20″W	San Antonio	1966	
Alexander and Alma Oppenheimer Halff House†	More images	112	601 Howard St. 29°26′31″N 98°29′45″W	San Antonio	1997	601 Howard Street, San Antonio at West Laurel
Alfred Giles Home‡		18172	308 King William St. 29°24′53″N 98°29′34″W	San Antonio	2015	
Altgelt-Isbell House‡	More images	134	226 King William St. 29°24′56″N 98°29′31″W	San Antonio	1962	[house also has Historic American Buildings Survey marker]
Anna Barbara and Johann Engelbert Heidgen House†	More images	12947	121 Starr St. 29°25′34″N 98°28′56″W	San Antonio	2003	121 Starr
Anton Wulff House‡	More images	5914	107 King William St. 29°25′4″N 98°29′27″W	San Antonio	1976	107 King William St., San Antonio
Aqueduct⁕†‡	More images	177	Between Espada Rd. and San Antonio River 29°19′56″N 98°27′40″W	San Antonio	1962	Mission Aqueduct, Espada Rd., San Antonio
Arsenal Magazine†	More images	212	646 S. Main Ave. 29°24′28″N 98°29′44″W	San Antonio	1977	
Benjamin Grossenbacher House	More images	13360	321 N. Alamo St. 29°25′44″N 98°29′8″W	San Antonio	1962	
Biesenbach House‡		18355	528 King William St. 29°24′43″N 98°29′43″W	San Antonio	2016	
Boldtville Schoolhouse		447	6634 New Sulpher Springs Rd. 29°21′46″N 98°21′36″W	San Antonio	1984	Loc. at Boltville community, at intersection of Sulphur Springs and Foster roads, San Antonio
Book Building‡		450	140 E. Houston St. 29°25′35″N 98°29′33″W	San Antonio	1978	140 East Houston, San Antonio; MARKER REPORTED MISSING 5/2011 (may be inside building)
Bullis House	More images	568	621 Pierce Ave. 29°26′34″N 98°27′53″W	San Antonio	1983	
Caile House‡	More images	622	526 E. Nueva St. 29°25′14″N 98°29′20″W	San Antonio	1966	
Carl Wilhelm August Groos House‡		2287	335 King William St. 29°24′52″N 98°29′38″W	San Antonio	1977	335 King William St., San Antonio
Casa Villita‡	More images	13340	511 Villita St. 29°25′19″N 98°29′18″W	San Antonio	1962	
Chabot House‡		796	403 Madison St. 29°24′48″N 98°29′36″W	San Antonio	1978	
Christ Episcopal Church‡		841	301 W. Russell Pl. 29°27′5″N 98°29′49″W	San Antonio	1986	Russell Pl. at Belknap
Christopher Columbus Italian Society Hall		848	201 Piazza Italia 29°25′51″N 98°29′55″W	San Antonio	1992	
Cos House‡	More images	1072	503 Villita St. 29°25′19″N 98°29′20″W	San Antonio	1965	503 Villita St., San Antonio; MEDALLION REPORTED MISSING 5/2011
David J. and May Bock Woodward House†		13398	1717 San Pedro Ave. 29°27′1″N 98°29′59″W	San Antonio	1994	
Dominguez-Micheli Houses		13344	228 Arciniega St. 29°25′10″N 98°29′23″W	San Antonio	1967	
Dr. Claudius E. R. King House		2952	819 Augusta St. 29°26′7″N 98°29′15″W	San Antonio	1973	819 Augusta St., San Antonio
Eagar House#		1324	434 S. Alamo St. 29°25′10″N 98°29′17″W	San Antonio	1962	434 S. Alamo, San Antonio
Elias and Lucy Edmonds House‡		15407	419 King William St. 29°24′49″N 98°29′40″W	San Antonio	2008	
Emil Elmendorf House†		1467	509 Burleson St. 29°25′58″N 98°28′22″W	San Antonio	1982	509 Burleson St., San Antonio; MARKER REPORTED TO BE INSIDE HOUSE 5/2011
Engleman-Muench House†‡		1483	415 E. Sixth St. 29°25′47″N 98°28′59″W	San Antonio	1984	415 Sixth St., San Antonio
Ernst Homestead	More images	1498	411 S. Presa St. 29°25′9″N 98°29′24″W	San Antonio	1983	411 S. Presa, San Antonio; MARKER REPORTED MISSING 5/2011
Fest-Steves Block†‡		13349	111-121 Military Plaza 29°25′28″N 98°29′45″W	San Antonio	1977	MARKER REPORTED MISSING 5/2011
Fiesta House‡		13350	231 S. Alamo St. 29°25′19″N 98°29′17″W	San Antonio	1962	
Fort Sam Houston, 4th U.S. Army Headquarters Quadrangle⁂†‡	More images	2014	E. Grayson St. at N. New Braunfels Ave. 29°26′40″N 98°27′44″W	San Antonio	1964	Grayson Street Gate, quadrangle on New Braunfels Rd.; MARKER REPORTED MISSING 5/2011
George Isbell Home‡	More images	13366	226 King William St. 29°24′56″N 98°29′31″W	San Antonio	1962	
German-English School‡		2178	421 S. Alamo St. 29°25′13″N 98°29′19″W	San Antonio	1962	421 S.Alamo St., San Antonio
Gilbeau Slave Quarters		13354	526 S. Main Ave. 29°25′10″N 98°29′42″W	San Antonio	1965	
Gould-Onderdonk House‡		13355	128 W. French Pl. 29°26′59″N 98°29′43″W	San Antonio	1973	
Gugger Homestead		14737	14464 Old Bandera Rd. 29°34′40″N 98°41′25″W	Helotes	2008	
Gustav Blersch House‡		16997	213 Washington St. 29°25′1″N 98°29′35″W	San Antonio	2011	
Halff House#		2333	HemisFair Park, 434 S. Alamo St. 29°25′14″N 98°29′13″W	San Antonio	1966	Hemisfair Park, S. Alamo St., San Antonio Carcross from La Vallia)
Hangar Nine⁕†	More images	13363	8030 Challenger Dr. 29°20′38″N 98°26′39″W	San Antonio	1967	N of intersection of Challenger Dr. and Inner Circle Rd., Brooks Air Force Base; MARKER REPORTED MISSING 6/2011
J.M. and Birdie Nix House‡	More images	13658	434 King William St. 29°24′46″N 98°29′40″W	San Antonio	2006	434 King William
Jack Hays House‡		13365	212 S. Presa St. 29°25′18″N 98°29′23″W	San Antonio	1962	South Presa at Nueva
Jay Adams House‡	More images	17233	505 Belknap Pl. 29°27′5″N 98°29′52″W	San Antonio	2012	Northwest corner of Belknap Place and Russell Place
Krause House/Mann's Crossing Post Office†		11747	8551 Old Pearsall Rd. 29°18′20″N 98°39′56″W	San Antonio	1999	
L. B. Clegg House†	More images	916	123 W. Park Ave. 29°26′39″N 98°29′43″W	San Antonio	1978	
La Quinta de las Piedras (Miguel Menchaca House)		12539	19801 Scenic Loop Rd. 29°37′43″N 98°41′6″W	Helotes	1965	
La Villita†	More images	3006	W of S. Alamo St. from E. Chavez Blvd. to Riverwalk 29°25′17″N 98°29′20″W	San Antonio	1962	Villita Rd., San Antonio
Little Church of La Villita‡	More images	3096	508 La Villita St. 29°25′18″N 98°29′19″W	San Antonio	1962	508 La Villita. Medallion reported missing Dec. 2005
Locke Hill Auditorium		17996	11937 I-10 W 29°33′18″N 98°35′11″W	San Antonio	2014	East side of IH-10 W. between Huebner Road and DeZavala Road
Madison Square Presbyterian Church		13368	319 Camden St. 29°26′7″N 98°29′30″W	San Antonio	1977	
Majestic Theatre⁕†‡	More images	5972	212 E. Houston St. 29°25′35″N 98°29′26″W	San Antonio	1991	212 E. Houston St., San Antonio
Marnoch Homestead		16488	15350 Scenic Loop Rd. 29°35′9″N 98°41′13″W	Helotes	2010	15350 Scenic Loop Road
Maverick-Carter House†‡	More images	16377	119 Taylor St. 29°25′48″N 98°29′16″W	San Antonio	2010	
Menger Hotel‡	More images	3334	204 Alamo Plaza 29°25′29″N 98°29′10″W	San Antonio	1965	Menger Hotel, 204 Alamo Plaza, San Antonio
Menger Soap Works†	More images	3336	500 N. Santa Rosa St. 29°25′45″N 98°29′48″W	San Antonio	1983	500 N. Santa Rosa-backs to Martin St., San Antonio
Mission Concepcion⁕†‡#	More images	13372	807 Mission Rd. 29°23′27″N 98°29′28″W	San Antonio	1964	MARKER REPORTED MISSING 5/2011
Mission San Francisco de la Espada Dam, Ditch and Aqueduct⁕†‡	More images	3412	Between Espada Rd. and San Antonio River 29°19′56″N 98°27′40″W	San Antonio	1969	Espada Road
Mission San Jose†‡#	More images	3415	6701 San Jose Dr. 29°21′44″N 98°28′47″W	San Antonio	1962	Mission San Jose, Mission Dr. San Antonio; MARKER REPORTED MISSING 6/2011
Mission San Juan Capistrano†‡#	More images	14071	9101 Graf Rd. 29°19′55″N 98°27′16″W	San Antonio	1962	MARKER REPORTED MISSING 6/2011
Moos Homestead	More images	3466	14610 I-10 W 29°34′50″N 98°35′53″W	San Antonio	1964	northwest corner of IH-10 and Utex Blvd. (Gunn Honda property). Marker reported missing Jan. 2012.
Navarro Houses⁕†§#	More images	3555	228 S. Laredo St. 29°25′23″N 98°29′50″W	San Antonio	1962	228 S. Laredo St., San Antonio
Norton-Polk-Mathis House‡	More images	3615	401 King William St. 29°24′50″N 98°29′39″W	San Antonio	1971	401 King William St., San Antonio
O. Henry House‡	More images	2453	601 Dolorosa St. 29°25′28″N 98°29′50″W	San Antonio	1964	corner of Laredo and Dolorosa Sts.
Old Edward Steves (Stevens) House‡	More images	5117	509 King William St. 29°24′46″N 98°29′43″W	San Antonio	1970	509 King William St., San Antonio
Old S. J. Brooks Home‡		526	155 Croften Ave. 29°24′26″N 98°29′37″W	San Antonio	1969	(King William District)
Old San Antonio National Bank Building†‡	More images	3804	239 E. Commerce St. 29°25′28″N 98°29′25″W	San Antonio	1979	239 East Commerce St. San Antonio
Old St. Mary's College‡		3819	112 College St. 29°25′32″N 98°29′26″W	San Antonio	1969	located En Route to Riverwalk. 112 College St., San Antonio
Oscar and Rachel Berman House‡		13621	338 Madison St. 29°24′48″N 98°29′33″W	San Antonio	2006	
Otto Koehler House	More images	2972	310 W. Ashby Pl. 29°26′55″N 98°29′49″W	San Antonio	1975	310 W. Ashby Place, San Antonio
Pereida House#		3987	510 S. Alamo St. 29°25′8″N 98°29′17″W	San Antonio	1962	502 S. Alamo St., San Antonio; MEDALLION REPORTED MISSING 5/2011
Perrin Home		13380	4101 Swans Landing 29°31′30″N 98°24′49″W	San Antonio	1968	MARKER REPORTED MISSING 5/2011
Petty House		18597	10 Tenth St. 29°26′8″N 98°28′56″W	San Antonio	2017	End of Tenth Street at San Antonio River
R.L. White Ranch†		17310	18744 Bandera Rd. 29°37′4″N 98°45′2″W	Helotes	2012	on highway approximately in front of Rancho Blanco sign inside fence
Rechel-Stumpf House	More images	4215	311 Howard St. 29°26′20″N 98°29′45″W	San Antonio	1962	311 Howard St., San Antonio
Rincon / Douglass School	More images	4269		San Antonio	1989	
Robert B. Evans Home		1510	7830 E. Evans Rd. 29°36′33″N 98°20′10″W	Selma	1969	Evans Rd., 4 mi of Fm 1604 (or Anderson Loop), San Antonio
Roy and Madge Hearne House‡		18444	300 W. French Pl. 29°26′59″N 98°29′50″W	San Antonio	2016	Southeast corner of West French Place and Belknap Place
Ruiz House‡	More images	4384	3801 Broadway St. 29°27′43″N 98°28′5″W	San Antonio	1966	Brackenridge Park at the Witte Museum, Broadway, San Antonio
Saint Mark's Episcopal Church†‡	More images	4463	315 E. Pecan St. 29°25′43″N 98°29′19″W	San Antonio	1962	
San Antonio Casino Club Building†‡	More images	752	102 W. Crockett St. 29°25′30″N 98°29′19″W	San Antonio	1979	
San Fernando Cathedral†‡	More images	4538	126 E. Main Plaza 29°25′28″N 98°29′39″W	San Antonio	1966	Main Ave., at main plaza; MARKER REPORTED MISSING 5/2011
San Francisco Di Paola Catholic Church		4539	205 Piazza Italia 29°25′51″N 98°29′56″W	San Antonio	1991	
Sartor House‡	More images	4595	217 King William St. 29°24′58″N 98°29′32″W	San Antonio	1983	
Schultze Hardware Store		13388	300 S. Alamo St. 29°25′19″N 98°29′17″W	San Antonio	1967	
Schulze-Schilo House		4609	221 Adams St. 29°24′35″N 98°29′30″W	San Antonio	1986	
Scottish Rite Cathedral†‡		4612	308 E. Ave. E 29°25′39″N 98°29′3″W	San Antonio	1987	
Site of Old St. Mary's‡		3818	202 N. St. Mary's St. 29°25′32″N 98°29′28″W	San Antonio	1969	corner of St.Mary's and College, San Antonio
Site of Original Building, First Baptist Church		13352	407 E. Travis St. 29°25′40″N 98°29′17″W	San Antonio	1967	SE corner of Travis and Jefferson
Spanish Governor's Palace⁕†‡#	More images	5001	105 Military Plaza 29°25′30″N 98°29′45″W	San Antonio	1962	Military Plaza, San Antonio
St. Anthony Catholic School‡		14596	205 W. Huisache Ave. 29°27′22″N 98°29′45″W	San Antonio	2008	
St. John's Lutheran Church, "the Rooster Church"		5045	502 E. Nueva St. 29°25′14″N 98°29′22″W	San Antonio	1962	502 E. Nueva St., San Antonio; MARKER REPORTED MISSING 5/2011
St. Joseph's Church‡	More images	5049	623 E. Commerce St. 29°25′25″N 98°29′11″W	San Antonio	1962	623 E. Commerce St., San Antonio
St. Mark's Episcopal Church†‡	More images	5056	315 E. Pecan St. 29°25′43″N 98°29′19″W	San Antonio	1992	
St. Paul's Episcopal Church		5073	1018 E. Grayson St. 29°26′35″N 98°28′5″W	San Antonio	1962	1018 E. Grayson, San Antonio
Staacke Brothers Building†‡	More images	5085	309 E. Commerce St. 29°25′28″N 98°29′22″W	San Antonio	1984	309 E. Commerce, San Antonio
Stevens Building†‡		5116	315 E. Commerce St. 29°25′27″N 98°29′21″W	San Antonio	1984	315 E. Commerce, San Antonio
Steves Homestead‡	More images	15493	509 King William St. 29°24′46″N 98°29′43″W	San Antonio	1970	
The Alamo⁕†‡#	More images	13324	300 Alamo Plaza 29°25′32″N 98°29′10″W	San Antonio	1962	Alamo Plaza; MARKER REPORTED MISSING 5/2011
The Argyle	More images	197	934 Patterson Ave. 29°28′32″N 98°28′19″W	Alamo Heights	1972	934 Patterson Ave., Alamo Heights, San Antonio (at doorway)
The Bexar County Courthouse†‡#	More images	399	100 Dolorosa St. 29°25′23″N 98°29′36″W	San Antonio	1976	Main Plaza, San Antonio
The Oge House‡	More images	3680	209 Washington St. 29°25′2″N 98°29′34″W	San Antonio	1971	209 Washington St., San Antonio
Thiele Cottage†‡	More images	5461	411 E. Sixth St. 29°25′47″N 98°29′0″W	San Antonio	1984	411 Sixth St., San Antonio
Thomas Jefferson High School†	More images	5470	723 Donaldson Ave. 29°27′54″N 98°32′15″W	San Antonio	1983	723 Donaldson Ave., San Antonio (Marker inside)
Toltec Apartments†‡		17893	131 Taylor St. 29°25′49″N 98°29′16″W	San Antonio	2014	131 Taylor Street (also known as 110 Auditorium Circle)
Twohig House‡	More images	5585	3801 Broadway St. 29°27′44″N 98°28′4″W	San Antonio	1962	Witte Museum Brackenridge Park, Broadway St., San Antonio
Ursuline Convent and Academy†‡	More images	3828	300 Augusta St. 29°25′52″N 98°29′32″W	San Antonio	1962	Southwest School of Art and Craft, 300 Augusta, San Antonio
Vollrath Building		13397	712 S. Alamo St. 29°25′1″N 98°29′18″W	San Antonio	1964	
W. B. Teagarden House		14565	408 Dwyer Ave. 29°25′9″N 98°29′38″W	San Antonio	2008	408 Dwyer Ave.
William and Mary Ann Richter House‡#	More images	13156	419 S. Presa St. 29°25′8″N 98°29′24″W	San Antonio	2002	San Antonio, 419 S Presa; MARKER REPORTED MISSING 5/2011
Wolfson House‡		5887	415 Broadway St. 29°25′49″N 98°29′9″W	San Antonio	1969	415 Broadway, San Antonio
Yturri Homestead and Mill†		5932	128 Mission Rd. 29°23′53″N 98°29′15″W	San Antonio	1966	
Zambrano House		5938	104 Anastacia Pl. 29°27′18″N 98°28′48″W	San Antonio	1966	104 Anastacia Place, San Antonio (near Breckinridge Park)
Zion Lutheran Church		11752	9944 Leslie Rd. 29°32′8″N 98°41′6″W	San Antonio	1997	

== Blanco County ==
Registered Texas Historic Landmark	Image	Marker number	Physical address	Nearest city	Year designated	Description
Adrian Edwards Conn Home†‡		6385	503 3rd Street 30°5′49″N 98°25′22″W	Blanco	1966	corner of Main and 3rd
Blanco County Courthouse	More images	427	101 E. Pecan Dr. 30°16′41″N 98°24′41″W	Johnson City	1983	located on courthouse square (7th and G street) in Johnson City
Blanco Methodist Church		431	61 Pecan St. 30°5′41″N 98°25′22″W	Blanco	1967	corner of 1st and Pecan Street in Blanco
Goeth Ranch House		2195	0.125 mi. N of RM 962 on CR 304 30°24′13″N 98°15′11″W	Round Mountain	1972	from Round Mountain (or US 281) to east on RR 962 then north on CR 304; 1/8 mile down CR 304
Hye Post Office	More images	2607	10261 W. US 290 30°14′33″N 98°34′13″W	Hye	1966	US 290 west in Hye, marker is on post office, the only building currently open and operating in the town of Hye.
Joseph and Eliza Bird Residence	More images	13484	265 Bird Ln. 30°25′51″N 98°20′33″W	Round Mountain	2005	265 Bird Lane, off FM 962
L. B. J. Boyhood Home‡	More images	2828	200 E. Elm St. 30°16′32″N 98°24′38″W	Johnson City	1965	9th and G Sts. in Johnson City
Old Blanco County Courthouse‡#	More images	428	300 Main St. 30°5′50″N 98°25′19″W	Blanco	1972	Corner of 3rd and Main Street (on public square) in Blanco
Saint Mary's Help of Christians Catholic Church		4471	1 mi. E of US 281 on CR 473 29°59′32″N 98°23′33″W	Blanco vicinity	1965	from Blanco, take US 281 south 6 miles, then go east on CR 473 about one mile; one north side of road

== Borden County ==
Registered Texas Historic Landmark	Image	Marker number	Physical address	Nearest city	Year designated	Description
Borden County Jail		457	Courthouse Square along 100 blk S. Elm St. 32°46′12″N 101°26′40″W	Gail	1967	Courthouse Square

== Bosque County ==
Registered Texas Historic Landmark	Image	Marker number	Physical address	Nearest city	Year designated	Description
Bosque County Courthouse†#	More images	464	110 S. Main St. 31°55′22″N 97°39′26″W	Meridian	1965	at courthouse square, SH 22, Meridian
Clifton College Administration Building		919	215 S. College Hill Dr. 31°46′36″N 97°35′13″W	Clifton	1982	west 9th Street and South Avenue Q
Clifton Whipple Truss Bridge	More images	920	CR 3265 over North Bosque River 31°47′35″N 97°34′21″W	Clifton	1996	CR 3265 and FM 1991, northeast part of Clifton
First Methodist Church of Valley Mills		1774	501 Ave. C 31°39′33″N 97°28′15″W	Valley Mills	1991	SH 6 at 5th Street
First United Methodist Church of Morgan		1892	907 Charles St. 32°0′59″N 97°36′29″W	Morgan	1983	Louise and Charles Streets, Morgan
Graves-Payne House		13078	CR 1140 SE of SH 174 32°3′25″N 97°33′11″W	Morgan	2004	5.3 mi. NE on SH 174, then right on CR 1140
John and Mary Colwick House†		2825	Jack Branch Rd. N of CR 4235 31°42′37″N 97°41′50″W	Clifton	1989	from Clifton take FM 219 8 miles west; take CR 4230 south 1 mile; take CR 4235 1.1 miles west to house (first on the right)
Odle Log Cabin		3672	Odle Ln. near McClennan County line 31°36′36″N 97°32′26″W	Valley Mills	1978	5 miles west of Valley Mills via FM 217 to CR 3155 west to Odle Ln. (200 yards north of intersection of Odle Ln and CR 401)
Omenson House†		3859	At Norway Mill 3 mi. S of FM 219 on FM 182 31°41′31″N 97°39′31″W	Clifton	1962	from Clifton take FM 219 west about 7 miles; take FM 182 south about 3 miles; house is located on southeast side of the highway as road turns to the west, through gate reading "Norway Mill"
Our Savior's Lutheran Church		3889	152 CR 4145 31°46′21″N 97°40′43″W	Clifton	1965	from Clifton take FM 219 west about 6.8 miles; take FM 182 2.8 miles north to church
Searsville Baptist Church		4625	686 FM 217 31°39′29″N 97°30′19″W	Valley Mills	1962	from Valley Mills take FM 217 west about 2 miles to church
St. James Episcopal Church		13712	514 N. Bosque St. 31°55′40″N 97°39′31″W	Meridian	2004	514 N. Bosque
St. Olaf Lutheran Church‡	More images	18219	2680 CR 4145 31°47′32″N 97°46′27″W	Cranfills Gap	2015	
The Bertelsen House‡		5292	1 mi. W on CR 4145 from Old St. Olaf Church 31°47′8″N 97°48′2″W	Cranfills Gap	1979	2.5 miles northeast of Cranfills Gap via SH 22 north to Old Meridian Creek Road (1 mile before Rock Church) (Private residence)
Valley Mills Santa Fe Railway Depot		5630	401 Fifth St. 31°39′26″N 97°28′16″W	Valley Mills	1973	Valley Mills Park, 5th to 6th Streets on Avenue D, 2 blocks west of SH 6, Valley Mills

== Bowie County ==
Registered Texas Historic Landmark	Image	Marker number	Physical address	Nearest city	Year designated	Description
"Ace of Clubs" House†	More images	9493	420 Pine St. 33°25′27″N 94°2′39″W	Texarkana	1964	
Black Cherry Tree		12405	US 62 on Red River Army Depot	New Boston vicinity	1969	6 miles east of New Boston on US 62 (on U.S. Government reservation)
Central Christian Church	More images	9471	903 Walnut St. 33°25′47″N 94°2′39″W	Texarkana	1987	
Cervini House		9472	524 Spruce St. 33°25′25″N 94°2′53″W	Texarkana	1988	
Dalby Springs Methodist Church		9474	CR 4507 at Dalby Rd. 33°22′2″N 94°40′52″W	DeKalb	1965	11 miles south of DeKalb on US 259, 1 mi. E on FM 561
Dr. A. H. A. and Ruby Jones House		12938	1121 S. Lake Dr. 33°24′36″N 94°3′37″W	Texarkana	2002	1121 South Lake Dr
Earl-Rochelle House†		11760	1920 Magnolia St. 33°26′8″N 94°2′37″W	Texarkana	1997	
Ellis House		11761	716 Olive St. 33°25′38″N 94°2′41″W	Texarkana	1997	
Home of Eli H. Moores		13374	1609 New Boston Rd. 33°26′5″N 94°3′37″W	Texarkana	1964	
Howell W. Runnels Home		9506	1402 W. Ninth St. 33°25′32″N 94°3′27″W	Texarkana	1964	
Hubbard Home		9487	108 Magnolia St. 33°27′47″N 94°25′8″W	New Boston	1967	
John F. Floyd House		9481	1203 Wood St. 33°25′54″N 94°2′48″W	Texarkana	1989	
Jones-Tyson House		9489	211 Magnolia St. 33°27′45″N 94°25′21″W	New Boston	1965	
Moores-Burke-Ragland Home		9494	802 Main St. 33°25′37″N 94°2′50″W	Texarkana	1978	
Offenhauser Building†	More images	9497	219 N. State Line Ave. 33°25′20″N 94°2′36″W	Texarkana	1965	Texarkana Historical Museum; State Line Ave. and Third St.
Old Rialto Building†	More images	9503	317 N. State Line Ave. 33°25′24″N 94°2′36″W	Texarkana	1966	
Phillip A. Dalby Homestead		12406	CR 4315 near county line 33°21′34″N 94°44′49″W	DeKalb vicinity	1966	11 miles south of DeKalb on US 259, then 3.3 mi. west on County Line Rd.
Rochelle Place		9504	595 Myrtle Springs Rd. 33°28′52″N 94°9′59″W	Texarkana vicinity	1966	9 miles northwest of Texarkana on Myrtle Springs Rd./Birdwell David Dr.
Saenger Theatre†#	More images	9507	219 Main St. 33°25′18″N 94°2′41″W	Texarkana	1982	
St. James Episcopal Church	More images	9509	417 Olive St. 33°25′28″N 94°2′38″W	Texarkana	1964	
The Jamison Building		9488	513 W. Third St. 33°25′14″N 94°2′51″W	Texarkana	1983	523.5 W. Third St.
United States Post Office and Courthouse†	More images	9512	500 N. State Line Ave. 33°25′32″N 94°2′35″W	Texarkana	1970	
Whitaker House†		9514	517 Whitaker St. 33°25′19″N 94°3′25″W	Texarkana	1973	

== Brazoria County ==
Registered Texas Historic Landmark	Image	Marker number	Physical address	Nearest city	Year designated	Description
Aldridge-Smith Home		9518	533 Main St. 29°8′23″N 95°37′5″W	East Columbia	1983	
Allen Place		9519	622 Burnett St. 28°56′6″N 95°18′25″W	Quintana	1964	Burnett St. near Quintana Beach Park
Bethel Presbyterian Church		9529	119 Main St. 29°8′36″N 95°36′44″W	East Columbia	1966	Duval and Main St.
Birchfield - McCown House		9530	404 S. Beauregard St. 29°25′15″N 95°15′7″W	Alvin	1972	SE corner of Lang and Beauregard St.
Brazoria Bridge†	More images	9531	Immediately W of SH 332 bridge over Brazos River 29°3′15″N 95°33′25″W	Brazoria vicinity	1991	SH 332 and FM 521 interchange, 1 mi. east of Brazoria in roadside park
Cummings-Smith House		9550	503 W. Lang St. 29°25′15″N 95°14′53″W	Alvin	1977	
Freeport National Bank (Freeport Sulphur Company Building)		9563	226 W. Park Ave. 28°56′59″N 95°20′48″W	Freeport	1997	corner of Board and Park St.
James & Selina Phillips House		14761	104 Main St. 29°8′38″N 95°36′44″W	West Columbia	2008	
Levi Jordan Plantation§		9570	7234 FM 521 28°59′57″N 95°38′54″W	Brazoria	1967	4 mi. SW of Brazoria on FM 521 just past intersection of FM 521 and FM 524 (Four Corners)
Liverpool Cemetery		9571	S end of St. Anne St. 29°17′43″N 95°15′56″W	Liverpool	1966	end of St. Anne St., off CR 171
M. L. Weems House‡		9613	716 Main St. 29°8′16″N 95°37′9″W	East Columbia	1962	Main St., East Columbia
Masonic Oak		9573	Pleasant St. across from Masonic Oak Park 29°3′21″N 95°34′12″W	Brazoria	1966	Pleasant St., across from Masonic Oak Park
Munson Cemetery		9577	Jimmy Phillips Blvd. W of Munson Ranch Rd. 29°8′48″N 95°31′21″W	Bailey's Prairie	1966	SH 35
Old Brazoria County Courthouse†#		9533	100 Cedar St. 29°10′8″N 95°25′52″W	Angleton	1983	currently Brazoria Co. Historical Museum, corner of Cedar and SH 288, Angleton
Peach Point House		9580	SH 36 28°58′31″N 95°28′8″W	Jones Creek	1964	on SH 36, Jones Creek
Phair Cemetery		9586	Phair Cemetery Rd. 29°4′9″N 95°22′11″W	Freeport vicinity	1966	in the Phair Community, north of Oyster Creek off FM 523
Schuster Home		17999	1130 W. Second St. 28°57′17″N 95°21′40″W	Freeport	2014	
Sweeny Cemetery		9598	N. Main St. at edge of town 29°2′51″N 95°42′51″W	Sweeny	1966	north side of Sweeny, next to flag pole, FM 524
Sweeny Home		9599	405 E. Locust St. 29°10′5″N 95°25′42″W	Angleton	1986	
Sweeny-Waddy Log Cabin		9601	523 Main St. 29°8′24″N 95°37′2″W	East Columbia	1983	South Main Street, behind Ammon Underwood House
The 1937 Pearland High School		11765	2319 N. Grand Blvd. 29°33′51″N 95°17′0″W	Pearland	1999	
The Ammon Underwood House†	More images	9612	505 Main St. 29°8′25″N 95°37′2″W	East Columbia	1970	Main St., East Columbia
The Nash-Wright House		9615	Duval St. at Market St. 29°8′41″N 95°36′43″W	East Columbia	1973	Duval St., 1 block from SH 35, East Columbia
Tyler-Bryan-Weems House‡		12937	628 Main St. 29°8′21″N 95°37′6″W	East Columbia	2002	628 CR 703
Varner-Hogg Home (The "Varner")†§#	More images	9603	1702 N. 13th St. 29°9′47″N 95°38′25″W	West Columbia	1964	Varner-Hogg Plantation State Historical Park, north of West Columbia on Park Road

== Brazos County ==
Registered Texas Historic Landmark	Image	Marker number	Physical address	Nearest city	Year designated	Description
Astin-Porter Home‡		8663	600 E. 29th St. 30°40′14″N 96°22′6″W	Bryan	1980	
Carnegie Public Library†#	More images	13339	111 S. Main St. 30°40′23″N 96°22′24″W	Bryan	1969	
Cavitt House†‡	More images	8673	713 E. 30th St. 30°39′59″N 96°22′2″W	Bryan	1994	
E. J. Jenkins House†		8686	607 E. 27th St. 30°40′19″N 96°22′3″W	Bryan	1982	
Edge House†		8676	609 S. Ennis St. 30°39′54″N 96°21′57″W	Bryan	1991	
Eugene Edge Home‡		8677	508 E. 30th St. 30°40′8″N 96°22′8″W	Bryan	1985	
LaSalle Hotel†		12883	120 S. Main St. 30°40′23″N 96°22′25″W	Bryan	2001	120 S. Main St.
McMichael-Wilson House‡		8687	712 E. 30th St. 30°40′1″N 96°22′0″W	Bryan	1985	
Queen Theatre	More images	17340	110 S. Main St. 30°40′24″N 96°22′26″W	Bryan	2012	
Waldrop House‡		8700	615 E. 29th St. 30°40′9″N 96°22′5″W	Bryan	1983	
Wilkerson House‡		8702	614 E. 29th St. 30°40′11″N 96°22′4″W	Bryan	1983	
Wipprecht Home‡		16361	500 E. 29th St. 30°40′14″N 96°22′9″W	Bryan	2010	

== Brewster County ==
Registered Texas Historic Landmark	Image	Marker number	Physical address	Nearest city	Year designated	Description
Albion E. Shepard House		17696	100 NW. Second St. 30°12′28″N 103°14′43″W	Marathon	2013	NW corner of North Avenue D and North 2nd Street
Brewster County Courthouse†#	More images	1092	201 N. Sixth St. 30°21′30″N 103°39′48″W	Alpine	1965	5th St., Alpine
Chambers Hotel		801	106 SE. First St. 30°12′18″N 103°14′42″W	Marathon	1965	Main St., Marathon
City Building	More images	872	205 E. Sul Ross Ave. 30°21′36″N 103°39′38″W	Alpine	1965	205 Ave. E, Alpine
First Methodist Church		6405	208 E. Sul Ross Ave. 30°21′35″N 103°39′37″W	Alpine	1965	208 Ave D., Alpine
First School House		1862	106 NE. Third St. 30°12′29″N 103°14′39″W	Marathon	1965	Off Main Street 1 block west at 4th., Marathon.
Gage-Van Sickle House	More images	2093	109 N. Third St. 30°21′32″N 103°39′35″W	Alpine	1965	109 W. 3rd St., Alpine
Garcia-Valadez House		2103	108 W. Ave F 30°21′20″N 103°39′41″W	Alpine	1968	108 W. Ave F, Alpine
Hancock Building	More images	13362	118 N. Fifth St. 30°21′30″N 103°39′41″W	Alpine	1965	
Holland Hotel Building	More images	2509	207 W. Holland Ave. 30°21′26″N 103°39′46″W	Alpine	1980	207 W. Holland, Alpine
J.C. Carr-Bob Slight House		2669	406 N. Fifth St. 30°21′38″N 103°39′45″W	Alpine	1968	406 5th St., Alpine
Nolte-Rooney House†	More images	3603	307 E. Sul Ross Ave. 30°21′37″N 103°39′35″W	Alpine	1968	307 Ave. D, Alpine
Old Roman Catholic Church		13386	102 W. Gallego Ave. 30°21′17″N 103°39′38″W	Alpine	1965	
Our Lady of Peace Parish Hall		3884	102 W. Gallego Ave. 30°21′17″N 103°39′38″W	Alpine	1965	102 W. Ave G, Alpine
Pioneer School House		13381	106 NE. Third St. 30°12′29″N 103°14′39″W	Marathon	1965	Off Main St.
Ritchey Hotel, 1886		4276	102 E. Murphy Ave. 30°21′24″N 103°39′39″W	Alpine	1965	Corner of Murphy & S. 4th Sts., Alpine; (fronts tracks)
The Gage Hotel	More images	2092	102 NW. First St. 30°12′24″N 103°14′46″W	Marathon	1981	US 90 & Ave. C
W. W. Townsend Home		5679	807 W. Ave. D 30°21′26″N 103°40′11″W	Alpine	1986	807 W. Ave. D, Alpine

== Briscoe County ==
Registered Texas Historic Landmark	Image	Marker number	Physical address	Nearest city	Year designated	Description
Briscoe County Jail		513	400 Broadway St. 34°28′26″N 101°18′11″W	Silverton	1967	At northeast corner of Courthouse Square, SH 207, Silverton
Pleasant Lafayette Crawford House		4051	200 Pulitzer St. 34°28′34″N 101°18′21″W	Silverton	1983	200 Pulitzer, Silverton

== Brooks County ==
Registered Texas Historic Landmark	Image	Marker number	Physical address	Nearest city	Year designated	Description
Brooks County Courthouse†		523	100 E. Miller St. 27°13′32″N 98°8′38″W	Falfurrias	1977	US 281, Falfurrias

== Brown County ==
Registered Texas Historic Landmark	Image	Marker number	Physical address	Nearest city	Year designated	Description
Adams-Shaw House		83	1600 Shaw Dr. 31°41′37″N 98°59′41″W	Brownwood	1975	
Brownwood Harvey House†		11768	600 Washington St. 31°42′59″N 98°58′47″W	Brownwood	1999	adjacent to the Santa Fe Passenger Depot
Brownwood Santa Fe Passenger Depot†		12464	600 E. Depot St. 31°42′57″N 98°58′47″W	Brownwood	1996	on Washington Ave., between E. Depot and E. Adams streets
Coggin Academy-McClelland Library		3279	1320 Austin Ave. 31°42′39″N 98°58′39″W	Brownwood	1963	on campus of Howard Payne University
J. A. Walker House†		2668	701 Center Ave. 31°43′8″N 98°59′5″W	Brownwood	1982	
John Wesley Malone Home		2821	606 Coggin Ave. 31°42′44″N 98°58′27″W	Brownwood	1976	
R. B. Rogers House†		4150	707 Center Ave. 31°43′7″N 98°59′6″W	Brownwood	1982	
St. John's Church†		5042	700 Main St. 31°43′10″N 98°59′8″W	Brownwood	1962	Main and Depot Streets, Brownwood.
Zephyr Gospel Tabernacle		5949	FM 218 at CR 281 31°40′30″N 98°47′33″W	Zephyr	1976	SH 218, 1 block east of US 183, Zephyr

== Burleson County ==
Registered Texas Historic Landmark	Image	Marker number	Physical address	Nearest city	Year designated	Description
Duewall House		12724	4212 E. SH 21 30°34′27″N 96°38′50″W	Caldwell	2001	4 miles east of Caldwell on SH 21
Lyons Methodist Church		8642	13608 Pecan Dr. 30°23′13″N 96°33′55″W	Lyons	1968	Southern Oaks Drive and Pecan Drive (1 block W of SH 36), Lyons
Porter House		12376	5760 CR 324 30°29′9″N 96°50′31″W	Caldwell	2000	4.5 miles west of Caldwell on SH 21, then 5.5 miles north on CR 324
Reeves-Womack House†	More images	8650	405 W. Fox St. 30°31′48″N 96°41′46″W	Caldwell	1983	405 W. Fox St. at Harvey St., Caldwell
San Salvador Mission Church		8652	9203 CR 286 30°36′13″N 96°31′40″W	Caldwell	1974	from Caldwell, take SH 21 E about 11 miles to FM 50, go S about 2 miles to CR 286, go W about 0.5 mile to church
Somerville Stadium	More images	18443	725 Eighth St. 30°20′23″N 96°32′10″W	Somerville	2016	Southwest block of 8th Street and Ave. L (middle of block surrounded by 8th Street, Ave. L, 7th Street, Ave. O)
Thomas Kraitchar Jr. House†		8639	200 E. Buck St. 30°31′58″N 96°41′29″W	Caldwell	1983	200 E. Buck St. at Porter St., Caldwell
Yegua Center at Somerville ISD		18442	616 Eighth St. 30°20′29″N 96°32′8″W	Somerville	2016	Northeast corner of 8th Street and Ave. L

== Burnet County ==
Registered Texas Historic Landmark	Image	Marker number	Physical address	Nearest city	Year designated	Description
1910 Post Office Building	More images	9740	115 Main St. 30°34′15″N 98°16′40″W	Marble Falls	1989	115 Main St.
Airy Mount Barn		9695	1819 E. Polk St. 30°45′17″N 98°12′30″W	Burnet	1986	from Burnet take SH 29 E approx. 1 mi.
Brandt Badger House		9701	404 S. Ave. M 30°34′7″N 98°17′10″W	Marble Falls	1974	404 S. Avenue M
Briggs State Bank†		13181	176 S. Loop 308 30°53′17″N 97°55′28″W	Briggs	2002	Briggs, S. Loop 308
Burnet County Jail	More images	9708	109 S. Pierce St. 30°45′28″N 98°13′35″W	Burnet	1966	corner of Washington and Pierce St (NE corner of Courthouse Square)
Christian-Matern House		9706	603 Seventh St. 30°34′28″N 98°16′18″W	Marble Falls	1996	603 Seventh St.
Crownover Chapel		9709	0.2 mi. S on CR 122 from FM 1855 30°38′33″N 98°17′4″W	Marble Falls	1972	take US Hwy. 281N approx. 2 mi. to FM 1855; then west on FM 1855 2 miles to Fairland Cemetery (chapel opposite cemetery)
Early Oatmeal School	More images	9738	0.5 mi. S of CR 326 on CR 327 30°41′47″N 98°5′10″W	Bertram	1968	from Bertram take FM 1174 S approx. .5 mi. to CR 326; west on CR 326 approx. 1.5 mi. to CR 327; south on CR 327 .5 mi.
Fort Croghan Stone Building		9712	703 Buchanan Dr. 30°45′25″N 98°14′15″W	Burnet	1966	on Fort Groghan Museum grounds
George Whitaker Home		9756	802 S. Main St. 30°45′6″N 98°13′35″W	Burnet	1966	802 S. Main
Governor O. M. Roberts' House	More images	9743	819 Seventh St. 30°34′33″N 98°16′29″W	Marble Falls	1978	819 Seventh St.
Henry Thomas Lodge, A.F. & A.M.		9752	S end of CR 344 30°32′34″N 98°10′4″W	Marble Falls	1967	from Marble Falls take FM 1431 E approx. 8 miles to CR 344, then south on CR 344 approx. 2 miles
Hoag-Faubion-Fuchs House		9718	902 Ave. F 30°34′31″N 98°16′16″W	Marble Falls	1994	902 Avenue F
Joppa Iron Truss Bridge		18764	E of CR 200 bridge over North Fork San Gabriel River 30°49′29″N 98°1′56″W	Bertram	2017	In Bertram at traffic light on SH 29, turn east for 0.3 m. on FM 243. Turn left on SH 1174 for 5.5 m. Turn right onto CR 200 for 3.4 miles to Joppa. Located east of new bridge on CR 200.
Logan Vandeveer		9755	703 Buchanan Dr. 30°45′25″N 98°14′15″W	Burnet	1974	703 W. SH 29 (in Fort Croghan Historical Museum complex)
Longhorn Cavern Administration Building‡	More images	9725	6211 PR 4 S. 30°41′4″N 98°21′3″W	Burnet	1989	from Burnet go south on US 281 approx. 5 miles to Park Rd. 4;then west on D4 approx. 7 miles (at park headquarters)
Masonic Hall		13370	308 S. Main St. 30°45′22″N 98°13′39″W	Burnet	1966	308 S Main St.
Old Cook Home		9707	200 N. Main St. 30°45′34″N 98°13′42″W	Burnet	1968	200 N. Main
Old Thomas Ranch House		9753	1 mi. W of FM 3509 1.5 mi. SW of SH 29 30°45′6″N 98°17′24″W	Burnet	1968	from Burnet take SH 29 W approx. 1.5 miles to CR 116; then SW on CR 116 1.5 miles, then west on private ranch road 1 mi.
Oldest Commercial Building in Burnet	More images	9739	309 S. Main St. 30°45′21″N 98°13′37″W	Burnet	1966	309 S. Main
Otto Ebeling House		9710	601 Ave. F 30°34′24″N 98°16′18″W	Marble Falls	1983	601 Avenue F
Rocky Rest		9744	404 S. Water St. 30°45′16″N 98°13′48″W	Burnet	1966	404 S. Water St.
Russell Fork Iron Truss Bridge		18750	E of CR 272 bridge over Russell Fork San Gabriel River 30°48′32″N 98°1′40″W	Bertram	2017	In Bertram at traffic light on State Highway 29; east on FM Road 243 for 2.1 miles. Turn left onto CR 272 for 3.9 miles. The bridge is on the east side of the new bridge built in 2005.
Stewart Pioneer Home		9749	1 mi. W of Mahomet 500 ft. N of FM 243 30°49′14″N 97°57′10″W	Bertram	1980	off FM 243 on private property
Struve House		9751	Double Horn Ranch 4 mi. S on CR 401 from SH 71 30°28′39″N 98°15′55″W	Marble Falls	1973	private property
The Bryson Place		9703	1100 CR 322 30°43′3″N 98°1′58″W	Bertram	1982	on private property
The Galloway House		9715	108 E. League St. 30°45′21″N 98°13′35″W	Burnet	1981	League and Pierce streets
The Roper Hotel†	More images	9745	707 Third St. 30°34′16″N 98°16′31″W	Marble Falls	1981	707 Third St.
The Russell-McFarland Homestead		9746	309 N. Boundary St. 30°45′42″N 98°13′30″W	Burnet	1978	309 N. Boundary St.

== Caldwell County ==
Registered Texas Historic Landmark	Image	Marker number	Physical address	Nearest city	Year designated	Description
Caldwell County Courthouse‡#	More images	9760	110 S. Main St. 29°53′4″N 97°40′19″W	Lockhart	1976	Courthouse Square
Caldwell County Jail‡	More images	9761	315 E. Market St. 29°53′4″N 97°40′10″W	Lockhart	1977	Brazos and Market St.
Cardwell Home		9762	505 S. Main St. 29°52′51″N 97°40′19″W	Lockhart	1980	
Dr. Eugene Clark Library‡	More images	9763	217 S. Main St. 29°52′59″N 97°40′21″W	Lockhart	1963	corner of S. Main St. and E. Prairie Lea St.
Ebenezer Lutheran Church		13742	291 Church St. 29°52′40″N 97°48′6″W	Maxwell	1986	291 Church Street
Emmanuel Episcopal Church†‡		9768	118 N. Church St. 29°53′7″N 97°40′24″W	Lockhart	1962	corner of N. Church St. and W. Walnut St.
First Christian Church (Disciples of Christ) of Lockhart‡		9770	202 W. San Antonio St. 29°53′4″N 97°40′25″W	Lockhart	1985	corner of W. San Antonio and Church St.
Francis-Ainsworth House		9772	214 S. Pecan Ave. 29°40′45″N 97°39′3″W	Luling	1996	
Karbach-Flowers Home		9779	219 Hackberry St. 29°52′46″N 97°40′23″W	Lockhart	1980	
Lockhart Vocational High School (Carver HS)†		14288	1104 E. Market St. 29°53′9″N 97°39′47″W	Lockhart	2008	1104 E. Market Street
Martindale Motor Corporation Building		23565	416 Main St. 29°50′21″N 97°50′38″W	Martindale	2022	
Mebane House		9782	508 State Park Rd. 29°52′7″N 97°40′33″W	Lockhart	1986	
The Coopwood House		9764	412 W. San Antonio St. 29°53′2″N 97°40′35″W	Lockhart	1979	
The Fritz Zedler Home		9785	1115 S. Laurel Ave. 29°40′6″N 97°39′4″W	Luling	1974	near the corner of S. Laurel St. and SH 80
William Johnson Cabin	More images	9778	300 blk. N. Magnolia Ave. in Blanche Sq. 29°40′45″N 97°39′3″W	Luling	1973	corner of US 183 and Austin St. (Blanche Square)

== Calhoun County ==
Registered Texas Historic Landmark	Image	Marker number	Physical address	Nearest city	Year designated	Description
Calhoun County Jail#		627	301 S. Ann St. 28°36′45″N 96°37′31″W	Port Lavaca	1983	301 S. Ann St., Port Lavaca
Grace Episcopal Church		1247	213 E. Austin St. 28°36′49″N 96°37′23″W	Port Lavaca	1965	213 E. Austin Street, Port Lavaca

== Callahan County ==
Registered Texas Historic Landmark	Image	Marker number	Physical address	Nearest city	Year designated	Description
Burkett Pecan Tree		573	Near end of I-20 N frontage road W of Cooper Creek Rd. (Exit 322) 32°22′41″N 99°9′40″W	Putnam	1966	2 mi. E of Putnam on US 80
Callahan County Courthouse	More images	13799	100 W. Fourth St. 32°23′39″N 99°23′41″W	Baird	2003	100 W. 4th St.
Clyde First Methodist Church		923	217 Oak St. 32°24′29″N 99°29′36″W	Clyde	1986	
First Callahan Jail		1694	100 blk. W. Fifth St. 32°23′44″N 99°23′42″W	Baird	1965	Courthouse square
Merchant Home		3343	CR 471 32°18′39″N 99°21′39″W	Baird vicinity	1962	from Baird, take US 283 south about 8 miles, then take county road 2.5 miles east for about .75 mile and turn north; follow road north to private property
Prew House		5406	118 Cherry St. 32°24′21″N 99°29′22″W	Clyde	1970	intersection of Bluebonnet and N. 1st Street, Clyde
Texas & Pacific Railway Depot†	More images	5241	100 Market St. 32°23′27″N 99°23′41″W	Baird	1985	South Market Street & First St., Baird

== See also ==
Recorded Texas Historic Landmarks listed by county
Anderson-Callahan • Cameron-Duval • Eastland-Gray • Grayson-Hudspeth • Hunt-Martin • Mason-Rusk • Sabine-Travis • Trinity-Zavala
