= Bandera County Courthouse and Jail =

Bandera County Courthouse
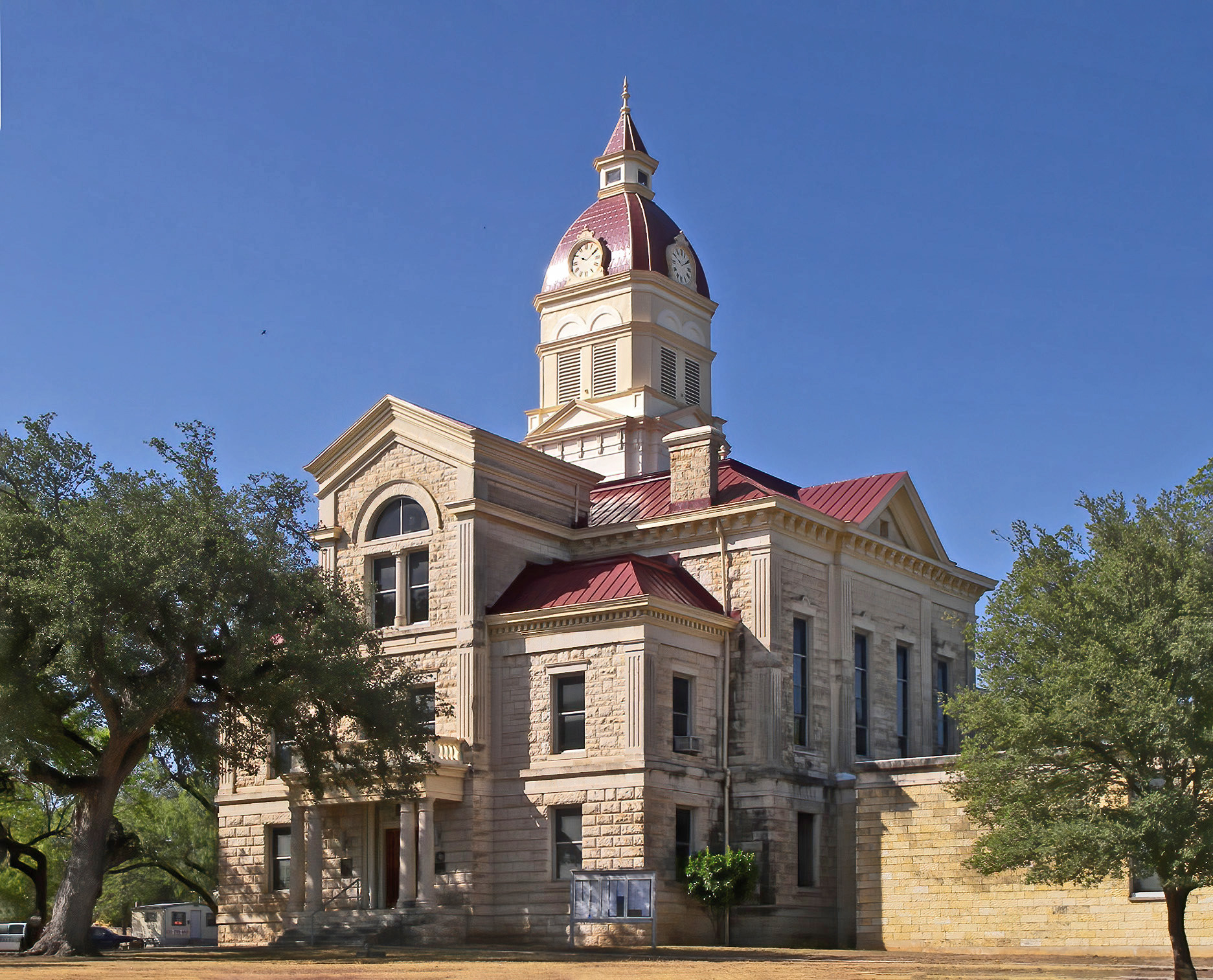
- Bandera County Courthouse in 2009

- Location within Texas Location within the United States
- Interactive map showing the location of Bandera County Courthouse
- 29°43′36″N 99°4′21″W
- Location: 504 Main St., Bandera, Texas

History
- Built: 1890

Site notes
- Architect: B.F. Trester
- Architectural style: Spanish Renaissance Revival
- Governing body: Bandera County, Texas

Recorded Texas Historic Landmark
- Designated: 1972
- Reference no.: 291

The Bandera County Courthouse and Jail are two separate historic county governmental buildings located near each other in Bandera, Bandera County, Texas, The Bandera County Courthouse, built in 1890 at the corner of Main and Pecan streets, is a Renaissance Revival style building designed by San Antonio architect B. F. Trester. It is three-story building with a central clock tower made from rusticated limestone cut from a local quarry. The clock is non-functioning and painted on, displaying the time 10:09. The current jail is a non-historic, modern facility located along State Highway 16 on the north end of town.

== Former courthouse and jail ==
- Bandera County Courthouse and Jail
- U.S. National Register of Historic Places
- Texas State Antiquities Landmark
- Recorded Texas Historic Landmark
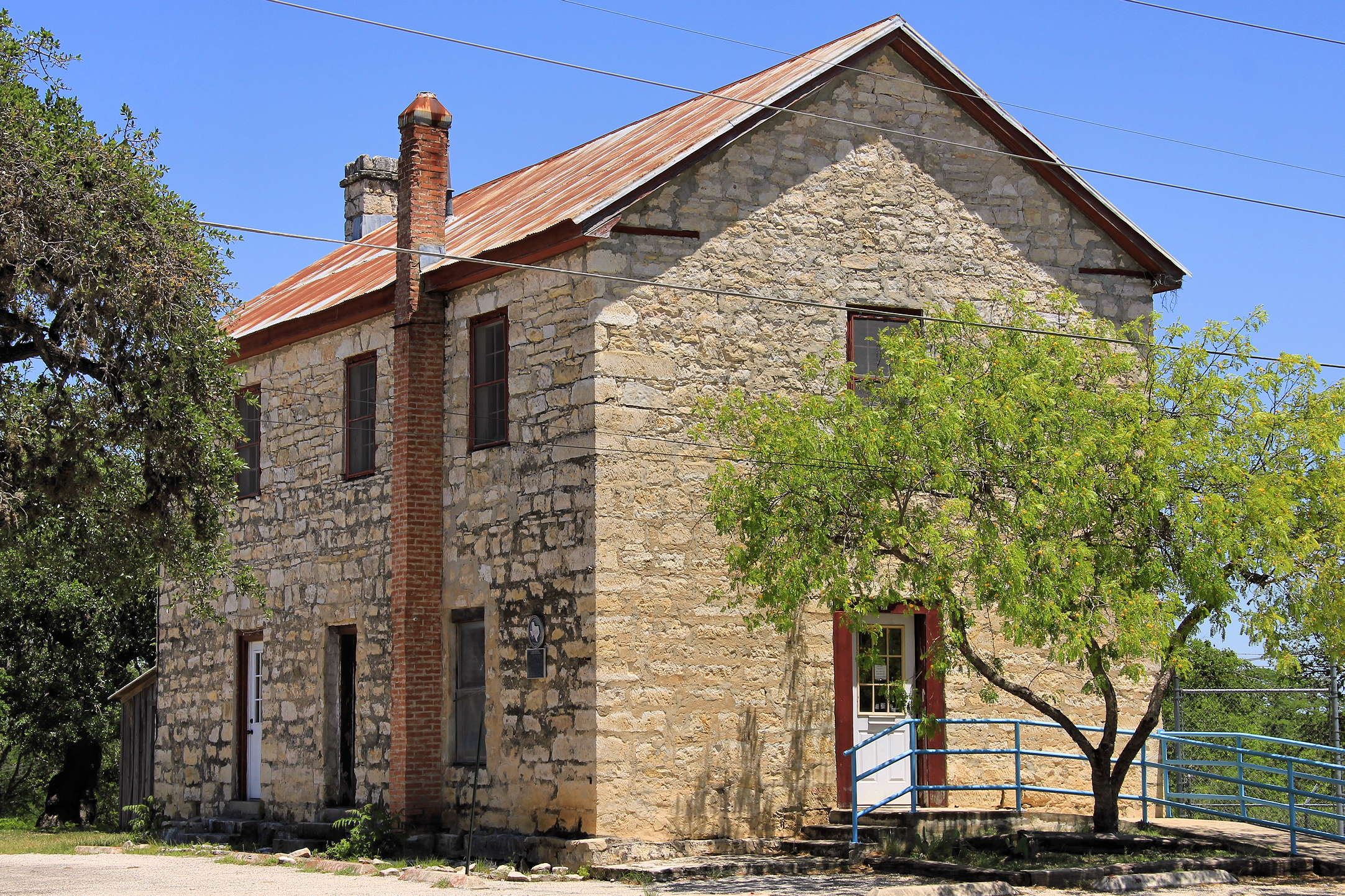
- Former Bandera County Courthouse in 2013

- Location within Texas Location within the United States
- Location: Public Sq., 12th and Maple Sts., Bandera, Texas
- Coordinates: 29°43′32″N 99°4′20″W
- Area: 2 acres (0.81 ha)
- Built: 1869
- Architect: B.F. Trester, Alfred Giles
- Architectural style: Renaissance Revival
- NRHP reference No.: 79002911
- TSAL No.: 8200000029
- RTHL No.: Courthouse: 1599; Jail: 3755

Significant dates
- Added to NRHP: October 31, 1979
- Designated TSAL: May 28, 1981
- Designated RTHL: Courthouse: 1979; Jail: 1965

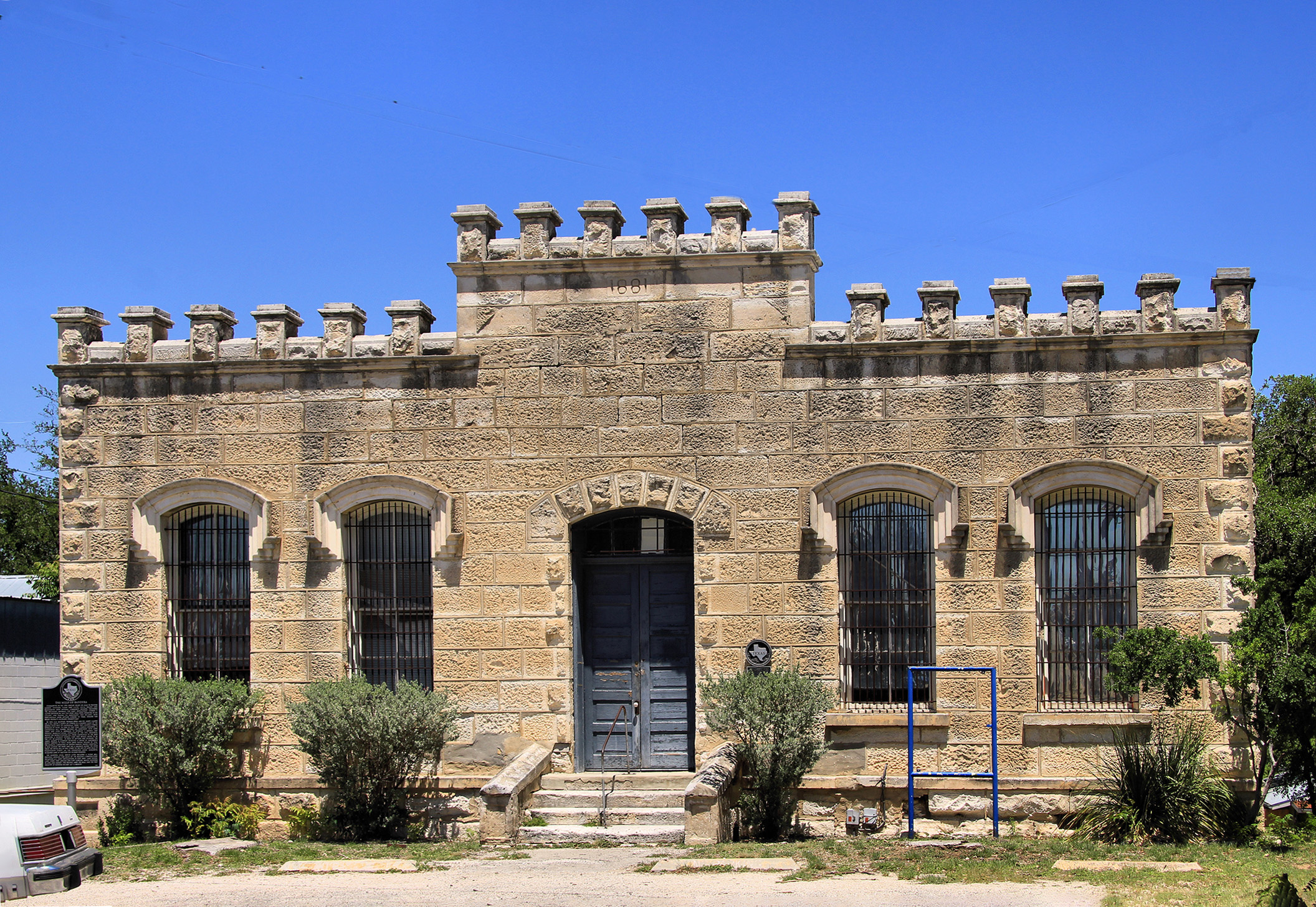
Former Bandera County Jail in 2013

Bandera County was organized in 1856 and used makeshift quarters for jail and courthouse functions until 1877, when the county purchased a two-story stone building constructed in 1868 which is now known as the Old Courthouse. The building served as county courthouse until the present courthouse was built in 1891. A former one-story cut stone jail adjacent to the Old Courthouse designed by San Antonio architect Alfred Giles was built in 1881. On October 31, 1979, the two buildings, located on 12th St. between Maple St. and SH 16, were added to the National Register of Historic Places as a single entry. The two buildings are also jointly listed as a State Antiquities Landmark.

== See also ==
- National Register of Historic Places listings in Bandera County, Texas
- Recorded Texas Historic Landmarks in Bandera County
- List of county courthouses in Texas

== Bibliography ==
- Kelsey, Mavis P, Sr.; Dyal, Donald H. (1993). The Courthouses of Texas. College Station, TX: Texas A&M University Press. ISBN 0-89096-546-3.
