= Guenther House (San Antonio) =

Historic house in Texas, United States

- Carl Hilmar Guenther House
- U.S. National Register of Historic Places
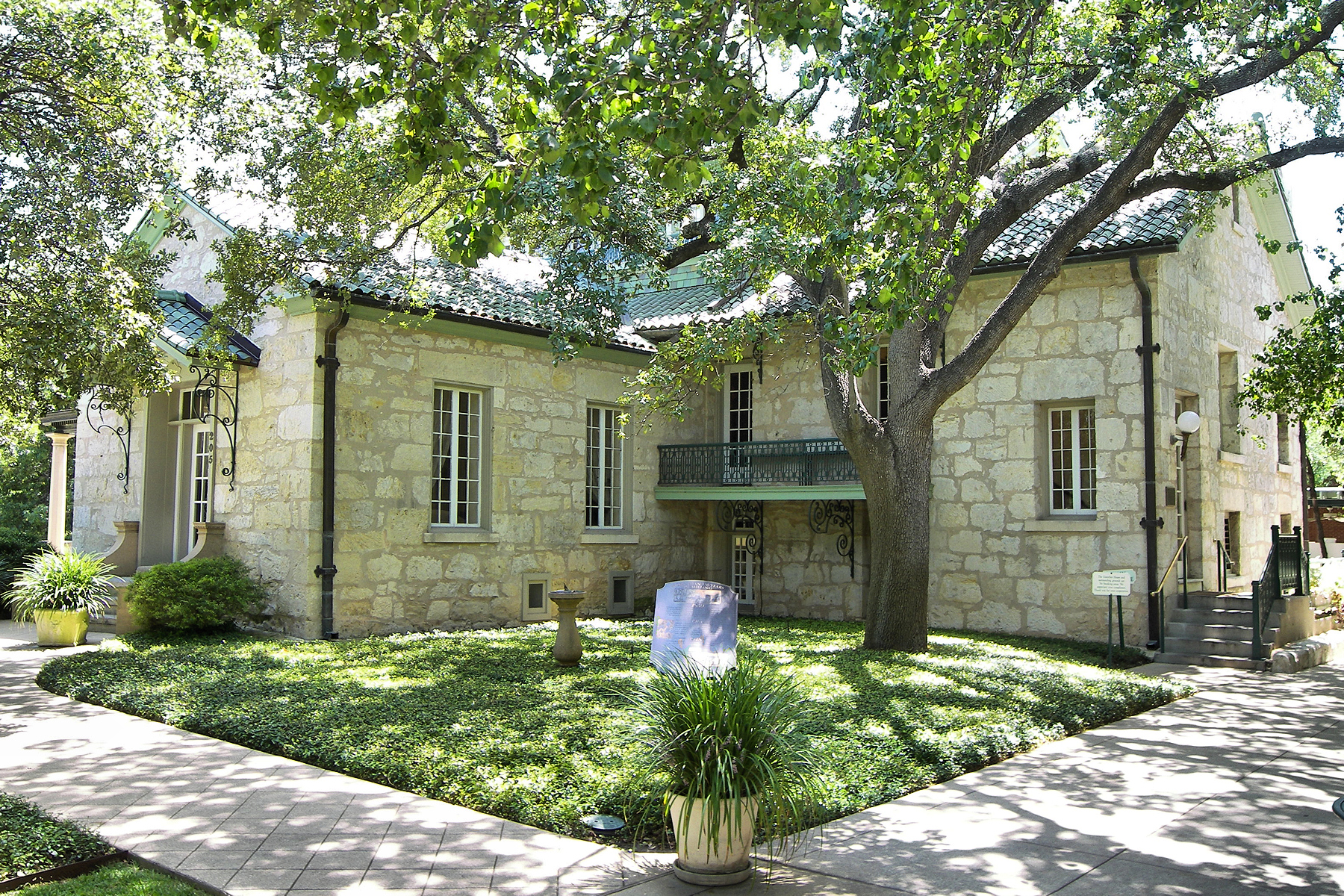
- Guenther House in 2012

- Location within Texas Location within the United States
- Interactive map showing the location of Guenther House
- Location: 205 E. Guenther St., San Antonio, Texas
- Coordinates: 29°24′41″N 98°29′44″W
- Area: less than one acre
- Built: 1880
- Architectural style: Vernacular Arts & Crafts
- Website: Guenther House Museum
- NRHP reference No.: 90001539
- Added to NRHP: October 11, 1990

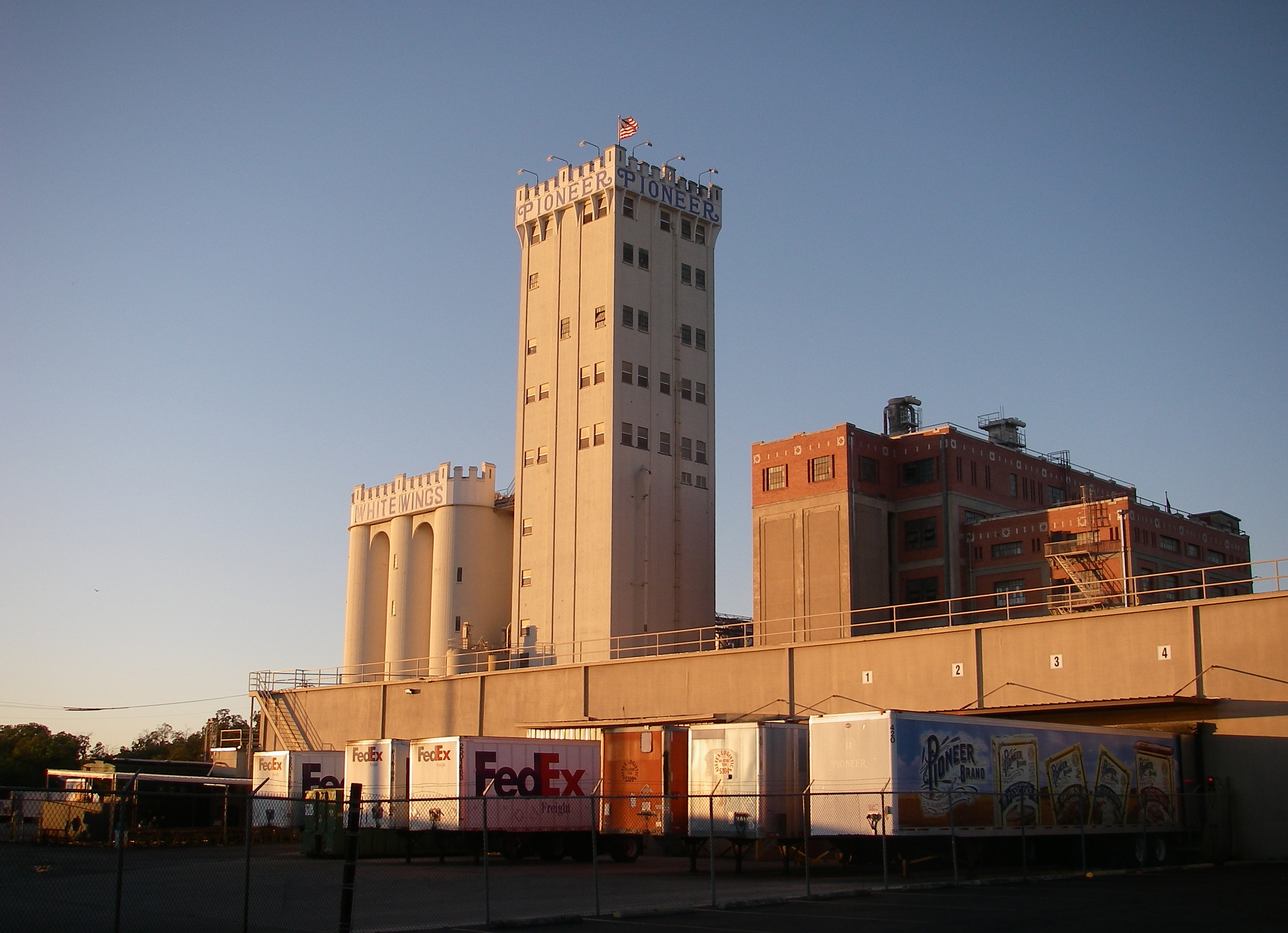
Guenther & Sons Pioneer Brand Flour Mill, San Antonio.

The Guenther House is a restaurant, museum and store located at 205 E. Guenther Street in the King William neighborhood of the Bexar County city of San Antonio in the U.S. state of Texas. Currently operated by C. H. Guenther and Son. Inc., the home was originally built as a private residence in 1859 by Pioneer Flour Mills founder Carl Hilmar Guenther. It was listed on the National Register of Historic Places listings in Bexar County, Texas on October 11, 1990.

== C.H.Guenther personal life and background ==
Carl Hilmar Guenther (1826–1902) was one of eight children born to millwright Carl Gottfried Guenther and his wife Johanne Rosina Koerner Guenther on March 19, 1826, in Weißenfels, Germany. Like his father, he had been trained to be a millwright, and in 1844 became a member of the guild of master millwrights in Europe. He also had trade skills as a cabinet maker and stonemason. In 1848, Guenther traveled to the United States. Guenther declared his intention to become a United States citizen on June 28, 1851. Citizenship was granted to him on October 8, 1854. He became a Justice of the Peace in 1856. On October 7, 1855, Guenther married Dorothea Pape. The couple had seven children.

== Emigration to Texas ==
Guenther's first visit to the United States was in 1848 through the port of New York with a sojourn in Wisconsin before returning to Germany. Three years later, Guenther returned through Indianola, Texas, at the time a major entry port for German immigrants.

=== Gillespie County ===
He relocated southwest of Fredericksburg at Live Oak Creek, near the present site of Lady Bird Johnson Municipal Park, and began constructing his dream of a gristmill. His steam-operated mill was built with imported French millstones. Inclement weather conditions came close to washing away the unfinished mill in a flood. Nevertheless, Guenther persevered and completed what would become known as Pioneer Flour Mills, a wheat and corn operation that served the area residents of Gillespie County.

=== San Antonio ===
Recurring periods of alternating floods and drought prompted Guenther in 1859 to reassess his situation. After seeing the need for mills to serve San Antonio's growing population, Guenther made the decision to move his base of operations there The site for his new mill would be on land directly adjacent to what became known as the King William Historic District.

=== King William District home ===
Guenther's home was one of the first built in the King William neighborhood. He began construction of his vernacular native limestone home in the district at King William and Guenther streets. The stones were quarried in the area that now is Brackenridge Park, and wood used in the construction was East Texas pine. The original entrance to the house faced southward towards the mill. A 1915 expansion of the house, changed the entrance to the north side, fronting the San Antonio River. The original entrance now serves as a hallway between the museum and the River Mill Store part of the house. The top floor of the house is known as the Roof Garden and once hosted dances. The space is currently used for large meetings or luncheons. The south side of the house now has a patio and arbor for outdoor dining.

An area of the house that once served as the library, is now the museum containing family keepsakes, as well as artifacts of milling, dining and baking history in San Antonio. Travel souvenirs from around the world are also part of the museum. The museum, store and restaurant are open to the public 7 days a week.

== See also ==
- National Register of Historic Places listings in Bexar County, Texas
