= Recorded Texas Historic Landmark =

State-level designation for historic properties in Texas

Recorded Texas Historic Landmark (RTHL) is a designation awarded by the Texas Historical Commission for historically and architecturally significant properties in the U.S. state of Texas. RTHL is a legal designation and the highest honor the state can bestow on a historic structure. Purchase and display of a historical marker is a required component of the RTHL designation process. Because it is a legal designation, owners of RTHL-designated structures must give 60 days' notice before any alterations are made to the exterior of the structure. Changes that are unsympathetic may result in removal of the designation and historical marker. More than 3,600 RTHL structures are spread throughout the state.

== Criteria ==
The Texas Historical Commission awards RTHL designation to buildings that are judged worthy of preservation based on architectural and historical merit.

- Age: Buildings or other historic structures may be eligible for RTHL designation after reaching 50 years of age. Structures older than 50 years that have been altered may be eligible if alterations occurred at least 50 years ago and took place during a significant period of the structure's history.
- Historical significance: Historical significance of a structure must be established through written and photographic documentation.
- Architectural integrity: The structure's architectural integrity, along with the historic persons or events associated with it, are considered. The structure must be an exemplary model of preservation and maintain its appearance from its period of historical significance. RTHL designation is not given if the structure has been moved within 50 years or if historic architectural features have been hidden within 50 years.

== See also ==
- Texas Historical Commission
- List of National Historic Landmarks in Texas
- List of Recorded Texas Historic Landmarks (Anderson-Callahan)
- List of Recorded Texas Historic Landmarks (Cameron-Duval)
- List of Recorded Texas Historic Landmarks (Eastland-Gray)
- List of Recorded Texas Historic Landmarks (Grayson-Hudspeth)
- List of Recorded Texas Historic Landmarks (Hunt-Martin)
- List of Recorded Texas Historic Landmarks (Mason-Rusk)
- List of Recorded Texas Historic Landmarks (Sabine-Travis)
- List of Recorded Texas Historic Landmarks (Trinity-Zavala)
- National Register of Historic Places listings in Texas
- Category:Recorded Texas Historic Landmarks
