= National Register of Historic Places listings in Lee County, Texas =

Location of Lee County in Texas

This is a list of the National Register of Historic Places listings in Lee County, Texas.

This is intended to be a complete list of properties listed on the National Register of Historic Places in Lee County, Texas. There are three properties listed on the National Register in the county. Two properties are Recorded Texas Historic Landmarks including one that is also a State Antiquities Landmark.

This National Park Service list is complete through NPS recent listings posted March 21, 2025.

== Current listings ==
The locations of National Register properties may be seen in a mapping service provided.

| | Name on the Register | Image | Date listed | Location | City or town | Description |
|---|---|---|---|---|---|---|
| 1 | Droemer Brickyard Site | Droemer Brickyard Site | November 7, 1979 (#79002991) | 1 mi (1.6 km). SW of Giddings on Old Serbin Rd; 30°10′21″N 96°57′07″W | Giddings | Kiln and other structures of local brick making business from 1924 to 1940 |
| 2 | Lee County Courthouse | Lee County Courthouse | May 30, 1975 (#75001998) | Bounded by Hempstead, Grimes, E. Richmond, and Main Sts. 30°10′53″N 96°56′14″W | Giddings | State Antiquities Landmark, Recorded Texas Historic Landmark; designed in 1898 by J. Riely Gordon in Richardsonian Romanesque style |
| 3 | Schubert House | Schubert House | August 25, 1970 (#70000753) | 183 Hempstead St. 30°10′55″N 96°56′12″W | Giddings | Recorded Texas Historic Landmark; two-story late Greek Revival house built about 1879; also known as the Fletcher House and now the Lee County Heritage Center |

== See also ==
- National Register of Historic Places listings in Texas
- Recorded Texas Historic Landmarks in Lee County
