= Old Dime Box, Texas =

Old Dime Box
- Unincorporated community
- Location within the state of Texas Old Dime Box (the United States)
- Coordinates: 30°22′38″N 96°51′47″W
- Country: United States
- State: Texas
- County: Lee
- Elevation: 387 ft (118 m)

Population (2000)
  - Total: 200
- Time zone: UTC-6 (Central (CST))
  - Summer (DST): UTC-5 (CDT)
- GNIS feature ID: 1375270

Old Dime Box is an unincorporated community in Lee County, Texas, United States. According to the Handbook of Texas, the community had an estimated population of 200 in 2000.

== Geography ==
Old Dime Box is situated along State Highway 21 in northeastern Lee County, approximately three miles northwest of Dime Box and 14 miles north of Giddings.

== History ==
The community originated in either the late 1860s or early 1870s. The settlement was first known as Brown's Mill, but was later changed to Dime Box. The origin of the name "Dime Box" stemmed from a custom in which early settlers would use a large, wooden box to forward and receive mail, or order small items from a carrier on horseback traveling to nearby Giddings. In 1913, when the Southern Pacific Railroad built a line three miles southeast of the community, most of the residents and businesses moved to a site near the tracks. From that point onward, the original settlement became known as Old Dime Box and the new community was referred to as Dime Box or New Dime Box. A Texas Historical Marker was erected in 1968 that honored Old Dime Box as the second oldest community in Lee County. The community had a population of approximately 200 residents in 1970 with several businesses. The population remained stable through 2000.

== Education ==
Public education in the community of Old Dime Box is provided by the Dime Box Independent School District. The district has one campus, Dime Box School, that serves students in grades pre-kindergarten through twelve.
