= Dime Box High School =

Dime Box School

Location
- 1079 Stephen F. Austin Blvd. Dime Box, Texas 77853-0157; United States; 30.357053°N 96.826942°W

Information
- School type: Public high school
- School district: Dime Box Independent School District
- Principal: Jay Smith
- Teaching staff: 19.53 (FTE)
- Grades: PK-12
- Enrollment: 150 (PK-12)(2023–2024) 53 (9-12)(2025-2026)
- Student to teacher ratio: 7.68
- Colors: Blue and gold
- Athletics conference: UIL Class 1A
- Mascot: Longhorn
- Website: Dime Box High School

Dime Box High School or Dime Box School is a public high school located in Dime Box, Texas (USA) and classified as a 1A school by the UIL. It is part of the Dime Box Independent School District located in northeastern Lee County. In 2015, the school was rated "Met Standard" by the Texas Education Agency.

== Athletics ==
The Dime Box Longhorns compete in these sports:

- Baseball
- Basketball
- Cross country
- Track and field
- Volleyball
- Six-man football

=== State finalists ===
- Girls basketball
  - 1982(1A)
