= Adina, Texas =

Ghost town in Texas, US

Adina
- Ghost town
- Location within Texas
- Coordinates: 30.4215962°N 97.1724901°W
- Country: United States
- State: Texas
- Texas: Lee
- Elevation: 440 ft (134 m)

Adina, formerly Cain, is a ghost town in Lee County, Texas, United States. Settled after the American Civil War, settler R. L. Cain donated five acres for a school and cemetery. Cain was the namesake of the town, until he changed the name to Adell, after a character in a novel he was reading. A post office operated from 1895 to 1908. At its peak, in 1896, its population was 40.
