= Victoria Romanoff =

Latvian-American visual artist

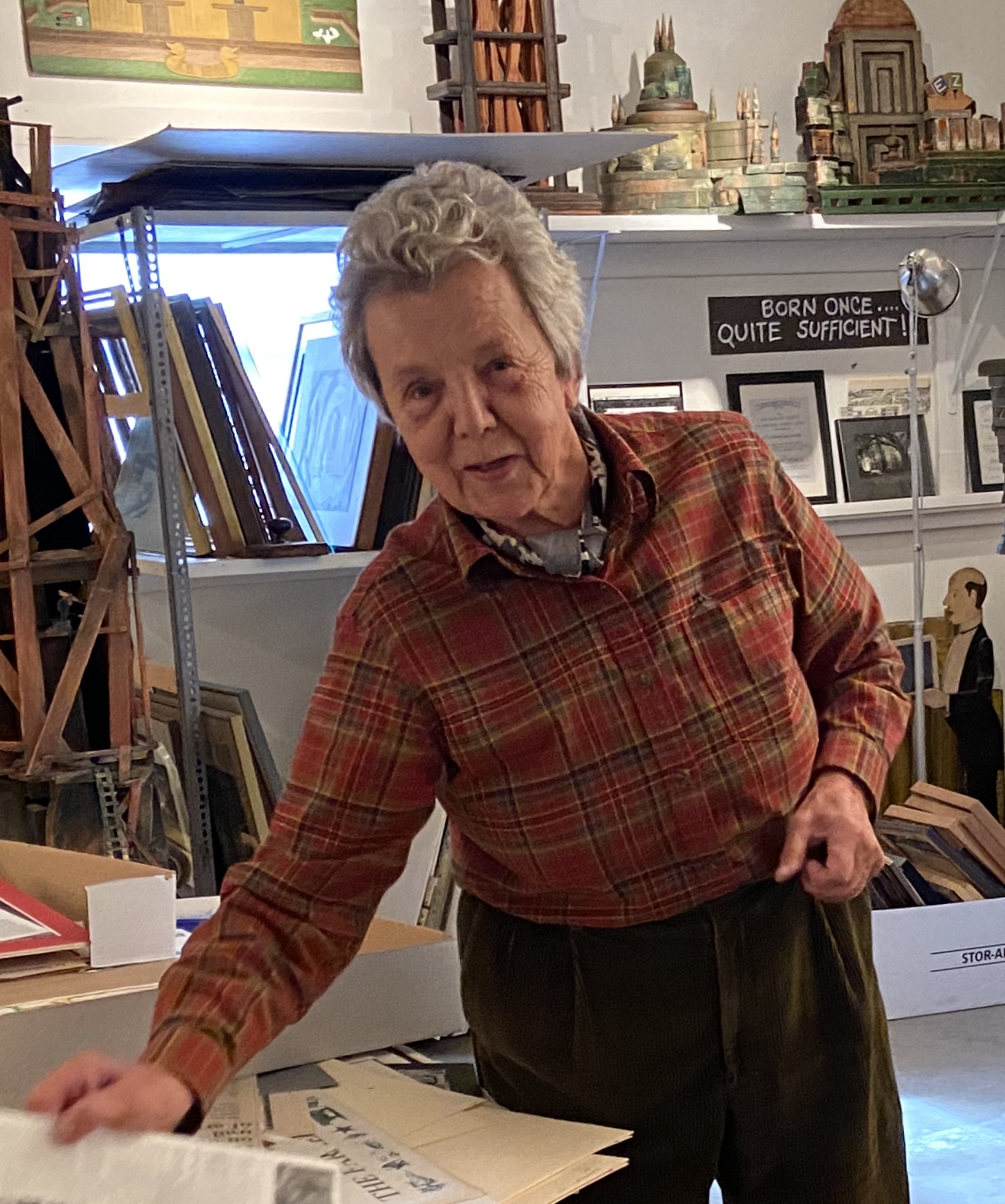
- Victoria Romanoff in her studio
- Born: 1939 (age 86–87); Riga, Latvia
- Citizenship: American
- Education: Rhode Island School of Design Cornell University
- Occupations: Visual artist, graphic designer, architectural preservationist
- Years active: 1964–present

Victoria Romanoff (born 1939) is a Latvian-American artist living in central New York. She is known both for her work in the visual arts (sculpture, painting, paper mosaics, illustration, printmaking and set design) as well as for her vast contributions in architectural preservation.

== Background ==
Born in Riga, Latvia, Romanoff spent a large part of her childhood in Displaced Persons camps in Germany during and after World War II. Emigrating to the United States in 1954, she received advanced degrees from the Rhode Island School of Design (BFA '61) and from Cornell University, for which she received a full scholarship from the College of Art and Architecture (MFA '64).

== Career ==
Throughout her long artistic career, Romanoff has explored a variety of themes which conjure lost civilizations, crumbling monuments, architectural follies, opinionated statuary and other imaginary settings. Her sculpture is always built from recycled elements, an adaptive method spawned from the necessities of her war-torn youth — an approach that continues to this day.

A senior partner of V. Romanoff & Associates, Romanoff has spent the last five decades dedicated to landmark preservation especially in and around Ithaca, New York. Among scores of projects, Romanoff has served as restoration consultant for the honor society of Telluride at Cornell University and Ezra Cornell's famed “Llenroc” residence; the Cortland County Courthouse, Cortland, NY; the business district in Bath, New York; and the Clinton House in Ithaca, N.Y, which is listed on the National Register of Historic Places. Romanoff is a founding member of the Constance Saltonstall Foundation for the Arts, Town of Dryden, NY.

== Recognition ==
Among many awards of distinction for her contributions to historic preservation, Romanoff received the Preservation Honor Award from the National Trust for Historic Preservation in 1983; Architectural Fellowship granted by the Ford Foundation - Educational Facilities Laboratories documenting 19th and 20th century storefronts in New York State in 1981); a Winston Churchill Traveling Fellowship from the English Speaking Union of the Commonwealth which funded three months of travel throughout the British Isles documenting, through drawings and photographs, the design materials of 18th and 19th century commercial storefronts in 1980; Two Historic Ithaca Preservation Awards in 2018; The Top 50 Newsmakers of the Last Quarter Century in 1998; and Ithaca's Woman of the Year (with Constance Saltonstall) in 1973. In 2006 Romanoff received a gold award from the American Concrete Institute for excellence in concrete and installation of a 60-foot by 30-foot public outdoor sculpture of a garden turtle entitled "Gaia".

== Personal life ==
In her spare time, Romanoff is known to be an avid Mycologist and published recipe author.

== Recent exhibitions ==
- CELEBRATE ReUse 2!, December 6, 2019 - February 29, 2020. Tompkins County Public Library, Ithaca, NY
- Tropicana!, May 3, 2019 - May 31, 2019. Petrune Gallery Space, Ithaca, NY
- Victoria Romanoff (Sculpture) & Gillian Pederson-Krag (Painting). September 7, 2018 - September 28, 2018. CAP Art Space, Ithaca, NY
- Line/Language, November 11, 2014 - December 20, 2014. Corners Gallery, Ithaca, NY
- Victoria Romanoff: Remainders Resummoned by Romanoff, June 15, 2011 - July 10, 2011. Found in Ithaca, Ithaca, NY
