= Hills, Texas =

- Unincorporated community
- Location in Texas Location in the United States
- Coordinates: 30°11′15″N 97°03′05″W
- Country: United States
- State: Texas
- County: Lee
- Elevation: 541 ft (165 m)

Population (2000)
  - Total: 20
- Time zone: UTC-6 (Central (CST))
  - Summer (DST): UTC-5 (CDT)
- GNIS feature ID: 2034646

Hills is an unincorporated community in Lee County, Texas, United States on U.S. Highway 290. According to the Handbook of Texas, the community had an estimated population of 20 in 2000.

== Education ==
Public education in the community of Hills is provided by the Giddings Independent School District.
