= Bexar County Courthouse =

- U.S. National Register of Historic Places
- Recorded Texas Historic Landmark
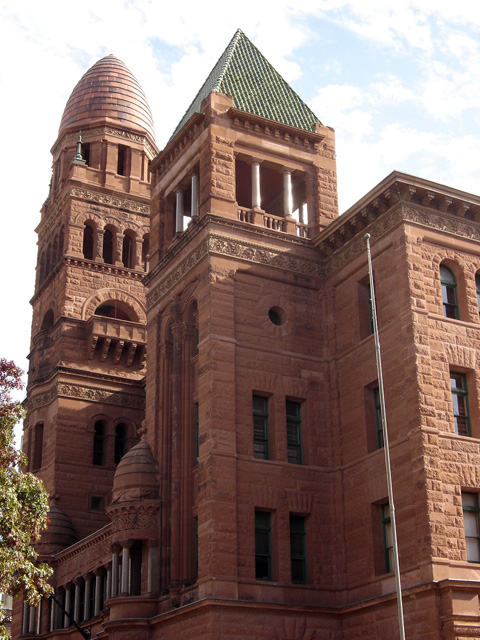
- The Bexar County Courthouse is a historic building in downtown San Antonio, Texas, USA.

- Location within Texas Location within the United States
- Interactive map showing the location for Bexar County Courthouse
- Location: Main Plaza; San Antonio, Texas, USA
- Coordinates: 29°25′25″N 98°29′37″W
- Built: 1891-1896
- Architect: James Riely Gordon
- Architectural style: Romanesque Revival
- NRHP reference No.: 77001426
- RTHL No.: 399

Significant dates
- Added to NRHP: August 29, 1977
- Designated RTHL: 1976

The Bexar County Courthouse is a historic building in downtown San Antonio, Texas, United States.

The building was designed by architect James Riely Gordon, and borders Main Plaza, along with such other architectural landmarks as the Cathedral of San Fernando. The style is Romanesque Revival, and the main material used is red sandstone. Ground was broken for Gordon's structure on August 4, 1891, and the cornerstone was laid December 17, 1892. After several delays, construction was fully completed in 1896. The building was added to the National Register of Historic Places in 1977.

The Courthouse currently functions as the county seat of Bexar County.

In the years of 1870-1910, almost every town in Texas had built a courthouse. The Bexar County Courthouse is the largest and oldest courthouse that is still operating in Texas.

== Architect ==
James Riely Gordon was the architect of the courthouse. He was born in Winchester, Virginia. His family moved to San Antonio, where he did most his work, when he was 11. In 1891, Gordon won a competition that would get him the commission of the Bexar County Courthouse. He has accounted for 18 courthouses, in which 12 of those still stand today. There are only a couple that aren't in Texas.

== History ==
There has been four major additions to the courthouse. The first one happened in 1914. The second one in 1923 was a massive remodeling and expansion to accommodate the growing population. Another expansion happened in 1963 where 9,000 square were added. The biggest expansion happened in 1972 where almost 39,000 square feet was added to the building. In total, the building is about 300,000 square feet.

There has been a recent finished restoration project that costed $9.1 million. It included the restoration of the original building. This recent restoration project removed the 1963 and 1972 additions. It seems that the main goal of this project was to return the courthouse to its original plan as much as they could, although the original plan before any additions cannot be found. This restoration improved the building by creating new entrances and a new stairway.

== Description ==
A four story red sandstone building. It is Romanesque Revival. The main entrance is an arched entrance. The courthouse has lived through major political changes which charged a lot of the unneeded expansions or renovations. It was rededicated in 2015.

== Gallery ==
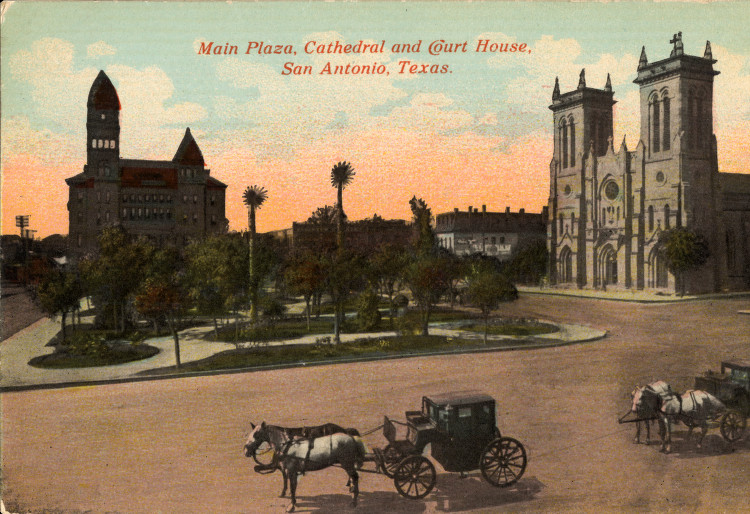
Main Plaza, Cathedral, and Court House, San Antonio, Texas

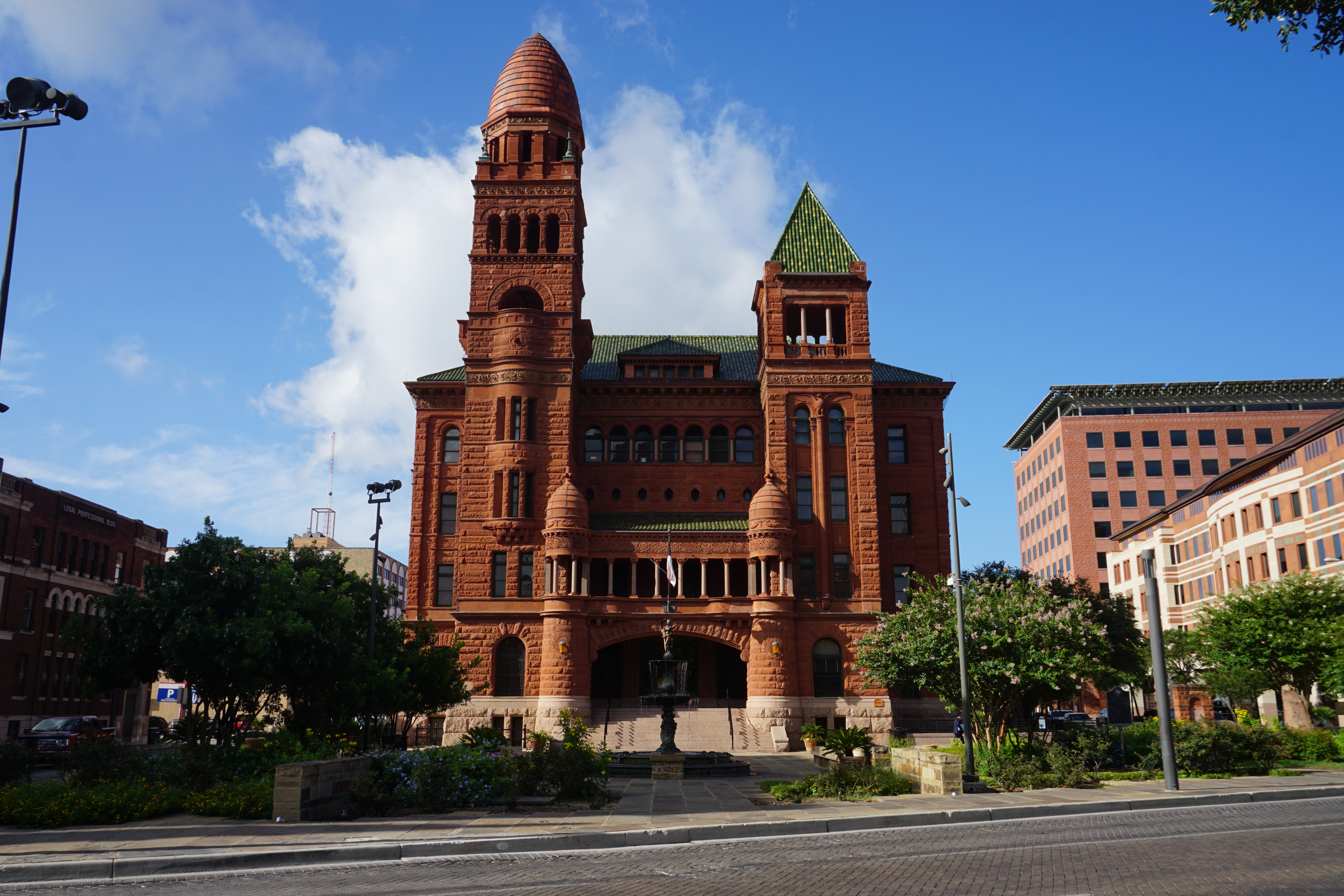
The Courthouse viewed from Main Plaza

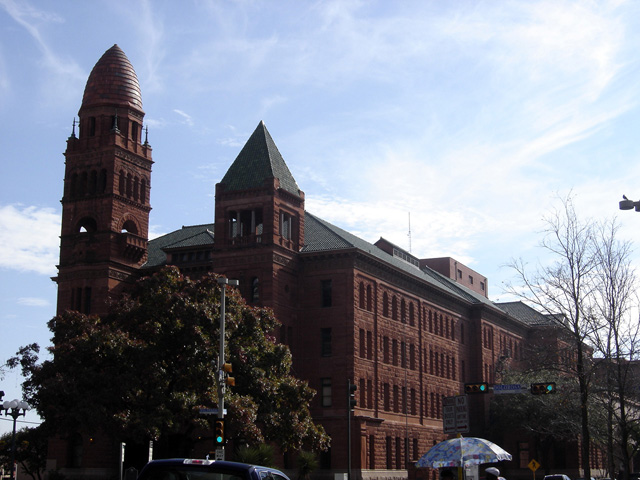
Another view of the Courthouse

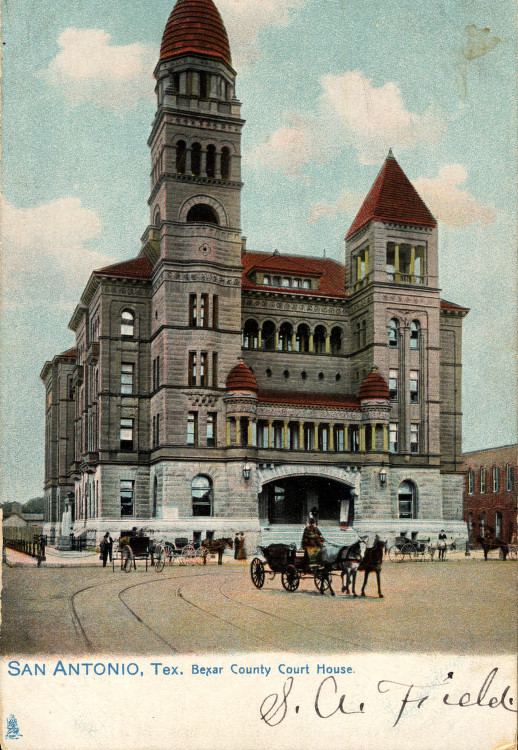
Postcard illustration of Bexar County Court House (ca.1896-1907)

== See also ==
- Main and Military Plazas Historic District
- James Riely Gordon

== Bibliography ==
- Kelsey, Mavis P, Sr.; Dyal, Donald H. (1993). The Courthouses of Texas. College Station, TX: Texas A&M University Press. ISBN 0-89096-546-3.
- Robinson, Willard B. (1981). Gone from Texas: Our Lost Architectural Heritage. College Station, TX: Texas A&M University Press. ISBN 0-89096-106-9.
