= Lee County, Texas =

County in Texas, United States

- County
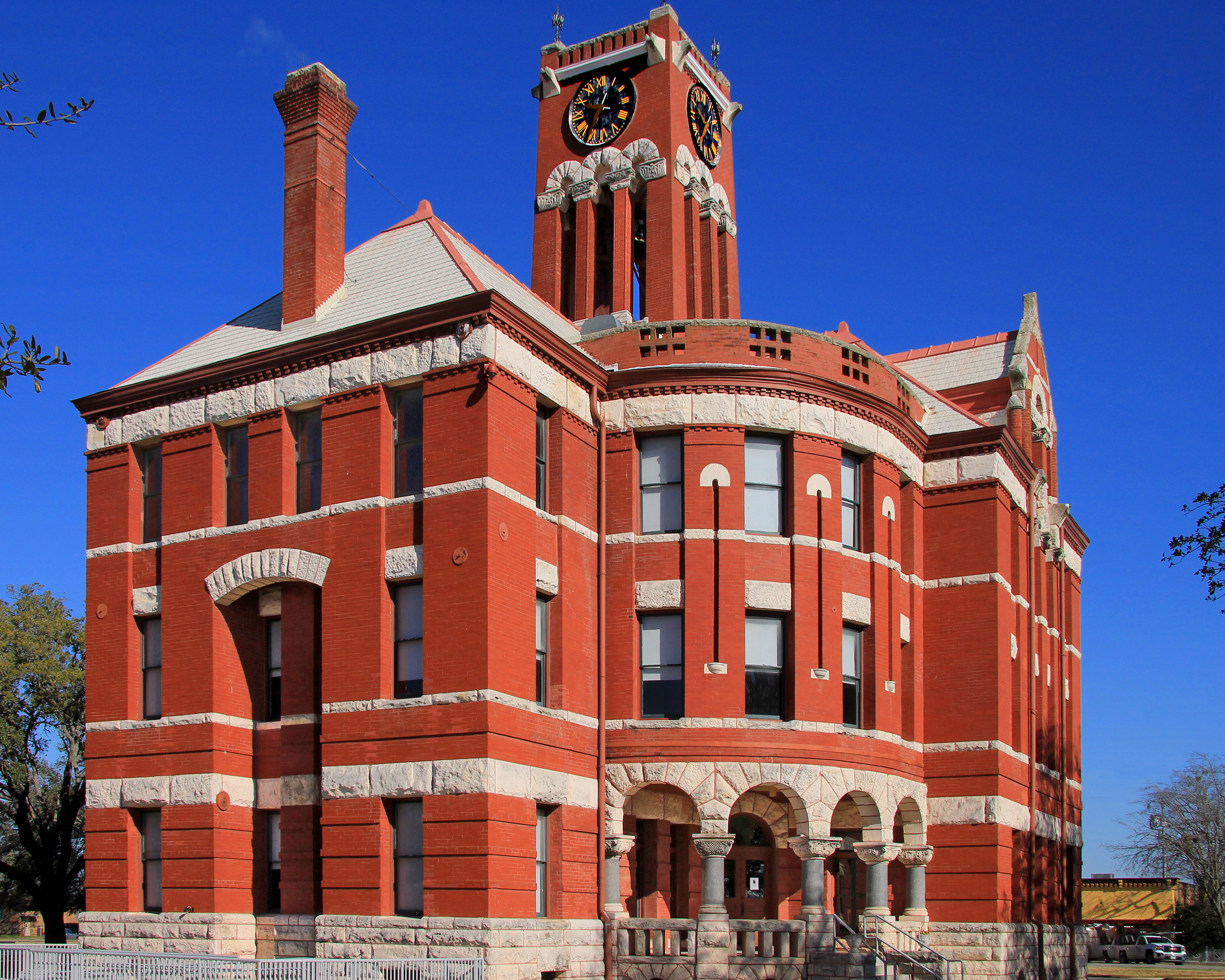
- County courthouse in Giddings, built 1899

- Seal

- Location within the U.S. state of Texas
- Coordinates: 30°19′N 96°58′W
- Country: United States
- State: Texas
- Founded: 1874
- Named for: Robert E. Lee
- Seat: Giddings
- Largest city: Giddings

Area
  - Total: 634 sq mi (1,640 km^{2})
  - Land: 629 sq mi (1,630 km^{2})
  - Water: 5.1 sq mi (13 km^{2}) 0.8%

Population (2020)
  - Total: 17,478
  - Estimate (2025): 18,729 ▲
  - Density: 27.8/sq mi (10.7/km^{2})
- Time zone: UTC−6 (Central)
  - Summer (DST): UTC−5 (CDT)
- Congressional district: 10th
- Website: www.co.lee.tx.us

Lee County is a county located in the U.S. state of Texas. As of the 2020 census, its population was 17,478. Its county seat is Giddings. The county was founded in 1874 and is named for Confederate General Robert E. Lee.

== Geography ==
According to the U.S. Census Bureau, the county has a total area of 634 square miles (1,640 km^{2}), of which 5.1 square miles (13 km^{2}) (0.8%) are covered by water.

=== Major highways ===
- U.S. Highway 77
- U.S. Highway 290
- State Highway 21
- Loop 123

=== Adjacent counties ===
- Milam County (north)
- Burleson County (northeast)
- Washington County (east)
- Fayette County (southeast)
- Bastrop County (southwest)
- Williamson County (northwest)

== Demographics ==
Historical population
Census	Pop.	Note	%±
1880	8,937		—
1890	11,952		33.7%
1900	14,595		22.1%
1910	13,132		−10.0%
1920	14,014		6.7%
1930	13,390		−4.5%
1940	12,751		−4.8%
1950	10,144		−20.4%
1960	8,949		−11.8%
1970	8,048		−10.1%
1980	10,952		36.1%
1990	12,854		17.4%
2000	15,657		21.8%
2010	16,612		6.1%
2020	17,478		5.2%
2025 (est.)	18,729	▲	7.2%
U.S. Decennial Census; 1850–2010 2010 2020

=== Racial and ethnic composition ===
Lee County, Texas – Racial and ethnic composition Note: the US Census treats Hispanic/Latino as an ethnic category. This table excludes Latinos from the racial categories and assigns them to a separate category. Hispanics/Latinos may be of any race.
Race / Ethnicity (NH = Non-Hispanic)	Pop 1980	Pop 1990	Pop 2000	Pop 2010	Pop 2020	% 1980	% 1990	% 2000	% 2010	% 2020
White alone (NH)	8,482	9,650	10,724	10,798	10,612	77.45%	75.07%	68.49%	65.00%	60.72%
Black or African American alone (NH)	1,757	1,752	1,872	1,772	1,631	16.04%	13.63%	11.96%	10.67%	9.33%
Native American or Alaska Native alone (NH)	26	13	47	44	47	0.24%	0.10%	0.30%	0.26%	0.27%
Asian alone (NH)	20	12	32	52	57	0.18%	0.09%	0.20%	0.31%	0.33%
Native Hawaiian or Pacific Islander alone (NH)	x	x	5	17	1	x	x	0.03%	0.10%	0.01%
Other race alone (NH)	8	17	11	7	37	0.07%	0.13%	0.07%	0.04%	0.21%
Mixed race or Multiracial (NH)	x	x	118	198	614	x	x	0.75%	1.19%	3.51%
Hispanic or Latino (any race)	659	1,410	2,848	3,724	4,479	6.02%	10.97%	18.19%	22.42%	25.63%
Total	10,952	12,854	15,657	16,612	17,478	100.00%	100.00%	100.00%	100.00%	100.00%

=== 2020 census ===
As of the 2020 census, the county had a population of 17,478. The median age was 41.9 years; 24.6% of residents were under 18 and 19.4% of residents were 65 or older. For every 100 females, there were 100.6 males, and for every 100 females 18 and over, there were 98.7 males.

The racial makeup of the county was 67.2% White, 9.7% Black or African American, 0.6% American Indian and Alaska Native, 0.3% Asian, <0.1% Native Hawaiian and Pacific Islander, 9.4% from some other race, and 12.8% from two or more races. Hispanic or Latino residents of any race comprised 25.6% of the population.

About 0.1% of residents lived in urban areas, while 99.9% lived in rural areas.

Of the 6,590 households, 32.0% had children under 18 living in them, 54.9% were married-couple households, 17.5% were households with a male householder and no spouse or partner present, and 22.7% were households with a female householder and no spouse or partner present. About 25.0% of all households were made up of individuals, and 12.0% had someone living alone who was 65 or older.

About 16.2% of the 7,860 housing units were vacant. Among occupied housing units, 77.8% were owner-occupied and 22.2% were renter-occupied. The homeowner vacancy rate was 1.5% and the rental vacancy rate was 9.0%.

=== 2010 census ===
As of the 2010 census, Lee County had a similar ethnic makeup compared to the overall United States.

=== 2000 census ===
As of the 2000 census, 15,657 people, 5,663 households, and 4,150 families were residing in the county. The population density was 25 inhabitants per square mile (9.7/km^{2}). The 6,851 housing units had an average density of 11 units per square mile (4.2 units/km^{2}). The racial makeup of the county was 76.59% White, 12.08% African American, 0.46% Native American, 0.24% Asian, 8.90% from other races, and 1.72% from two or more races. About 18.19% of the population were Hispanics or Latinos of any race. About 35.5% were of German and 8.3% American ancestry according to Census 2000; 80.1% spoke English, 14.4% Spanish, and 5.1% German as their first language. Of the 5,663 households, 35.7% had children under 18 living with them, 60.0% were married couples living together, 8.8% had a female householder with no husband present, and 26.7% were not families. About 23.8% of all households were made up of individuals, and 11.7% had someone living alone who was 65 or older. The average household size was 2.65, and the average family size was 3.15. In the county, the age distribution was 28.8% under 18, 9.2% from 18 to 24, 26.3% from 25 to 44, 21.4% from 45 to 64, and 14.4% who were 65 or older. The median age was 36 years. For every 100 females, there were 101.60 males. For every 100 females 18 and over, there were 98.0 males. The median income for a household in the county was $36,280, and for a family was $42,073. Males had a median income of $30,635 versus $21,611 for females. The per capita income for the county was $17,163. About 9.70% of families and 11.90% of the population were below the poverty line, including 13.70% of those under age 18 and 16.10% of those 65 or over.

== Politics ==
Lee County was historically Democratic, although less so than the majority of Texas, as it was somewhat allied with the isolated Republican German-American Unionist stronghold centered in Gillespie and Kendall Counties. Its voters nonetheless selected Democrats in every election up to 1976, except the landslide Republican triumphs of 1956 and 1972, plus the heavily war-influenced elections of 1916 and 1940, when its German-American population was suspicious of the Democratic Party's position towards Germany. Since 1980, like all of the rural White South, Lee County has become powerfully Republican. No Democratic presidential candidate has won a majority in the county since Jimmy Carter in 1976, although during the drought- and farm crisis-dominated 1988 election, Michael Dukakis won a 14-vote plurality. In the past five elections, the GOP candidate has always passed two-thirds of the county's vote and Donald Trump exceeded three-quarters in 2016, 2020, and 2024.

United States presidential election results for Lee County, Texas
Year	Republican		Democratic		Third party(ies)	
Year	No.	%	No.	%	No.	%
1912	134	13.58%	687	69.60%	166	16.82%
1916	836	56.11%	571	38.32%	83	5.57%
1920	325	14.65%	712	32.09%	1,182	53.27%
1924	271	11.87%	1,561	68.35%	452	19.79%
1928	449	27.63%	1,176	72.37%	0	0.00%
1932	110	5.67%	1,831	94.33%	0	0.00%
1936	271	18.99%	1,155	80.94%	1	0.07%
1940	1,150	54.61%	954	45.30%	2	0.09%
1944	771	35.11%	953	43.40%	472	21.49%
1948	465	21.91%	1,540	72.57%	117	5.51%
1952	1,316	48.61%	1,389	51.31%	2	0.07%
1956	1,200	52.77%	1,061	46.66%	13	0.57%
1960	1,048	42.76%	1,369	55.85%	34	1.39%
1964	923	32.86%	1,884	67.07%	2	0.07%
1968	1,075	35.97%	1,283	42.92%	631	21.11%
1972	1,877	66.70%	920	32.69%	17	0.60%
1976	1,348	40.81%	1,937	58.64%	18	0.54%
1980	1,803	52.08%	1,581	45.67%	78	2.25%
1984	2,967	64.05%	1,659	35.82%	6	0.13%
1988	2,513	49.60%	2,527	49.87%	27	0.53%
1992	2,108	41.68%	1,847	36.52%	1,103	21.81%
1996	2,354	49.00%	2,008	41.80%	442	9.20%
2000	3,699	66.82%	1,733	31.30%	104	1.88%
2004	4,160	68.33%	1,899	31.19%	29	0.48%
2008	4,312	67.62%	2,000	31.36%	65	1.02%
2012	4,507	72.27%	1,632	26.17%	97	1.56%
2016	4,997	76.20%	1,372	20.92%	189	2.88%
2020	6,255	77.22%	1,750	21.60%	95	1.17%
2024	6,724	79.90%	1,640	19.49%	51	0.61%

United States Senate election results for Lee County, Texas1
Year	Republican		Democratic		Third party(ies)	
Year	No.	%	No.	%	No.	%
2024	6,505	77.79%	1,719	20.56%	138	1.65%

United States Senate election results for Lee County, Texas2
Year	Republican		Democratic		Third party(ies)	
Year	No.	%	No.	%	No.	%
2020	6,211	77.33%	1,689	21.03%	132	1.64%

Texas Gubernatorial election results for Lee County
Year	Republican		Democratic		Third party(ies)	
Year	No.	%	No.	%	No.	%
2022	5,108	81.31%	1,095	17.43%	79	1.26%

== Government and infrastructure ==
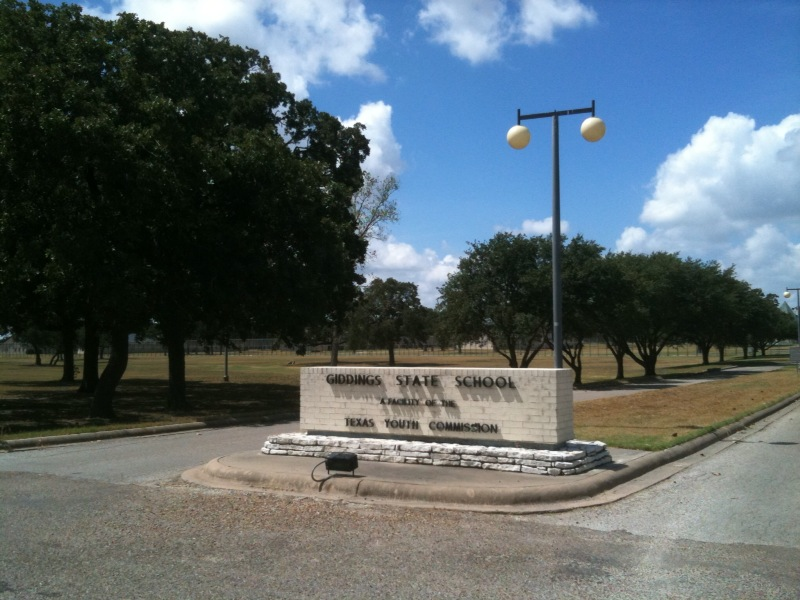
Giddings State School, a Texas Juvenile Justice Department reformatory, in unincorporated Lee County

The Texas Juvenile Justice Department (previously the Texas Youth Commission) operates the Giddings State School in unincorporated Lee County, near Giddings. As of 2004, the Giddings State School was Lee County's largest employer.

== Communities ==
=== City ===
- Giddings (county seat)

=== Town ===
- Lexington

=== Census-designated place ===
- Dime Box

=== Unincorporated communities ===
- Corinth
- Hills
- Lincoln
- Old Dime Box
- Serbin

== Education ==
School districts:

- Dime Box Independent School District
- Elgin Independent School District
- Giddings Independent School District
- Lexington Independent School District

Most of Lee County is assigned to Blinn Junior College District. Austin Community College is the designated community college for portions of Lee County in Elgin ISD.

== See also ==
- List of memorials to Robert E. Lee
- National Register of Historic Places listings in Lee County, Texas
- Recorded Texas Historic Landmarks in Lee County
