= Corinth, Lee County, Texas =

Corinth, Texas
- Unincorporated community
- Location within Texas Location within the United States
- Coordinates: 30°13′28″N 96°54′14″W
- Country: United States
- State: Texas
- County: Lee
- Elevation: 412 ft (126 m)
- Time zone: UTC-6 (Central (CST))
  - Summer (DST): UTC-5 (CDT)
- Area code: 979

Corinth is an unincorporated community in Lee County, Texas, United States. Corinth is located on County Road 118, 3.5 miles (5.6 km) north of Giddings. By 1900, Corinth had a school called Corinthian, which was also used as a church. The school closed in the early 1950s, and by 2000 all that remained of the community was the church and cemetery.
