= Dime Box, Texas =

- Unincorporated community Census designated place
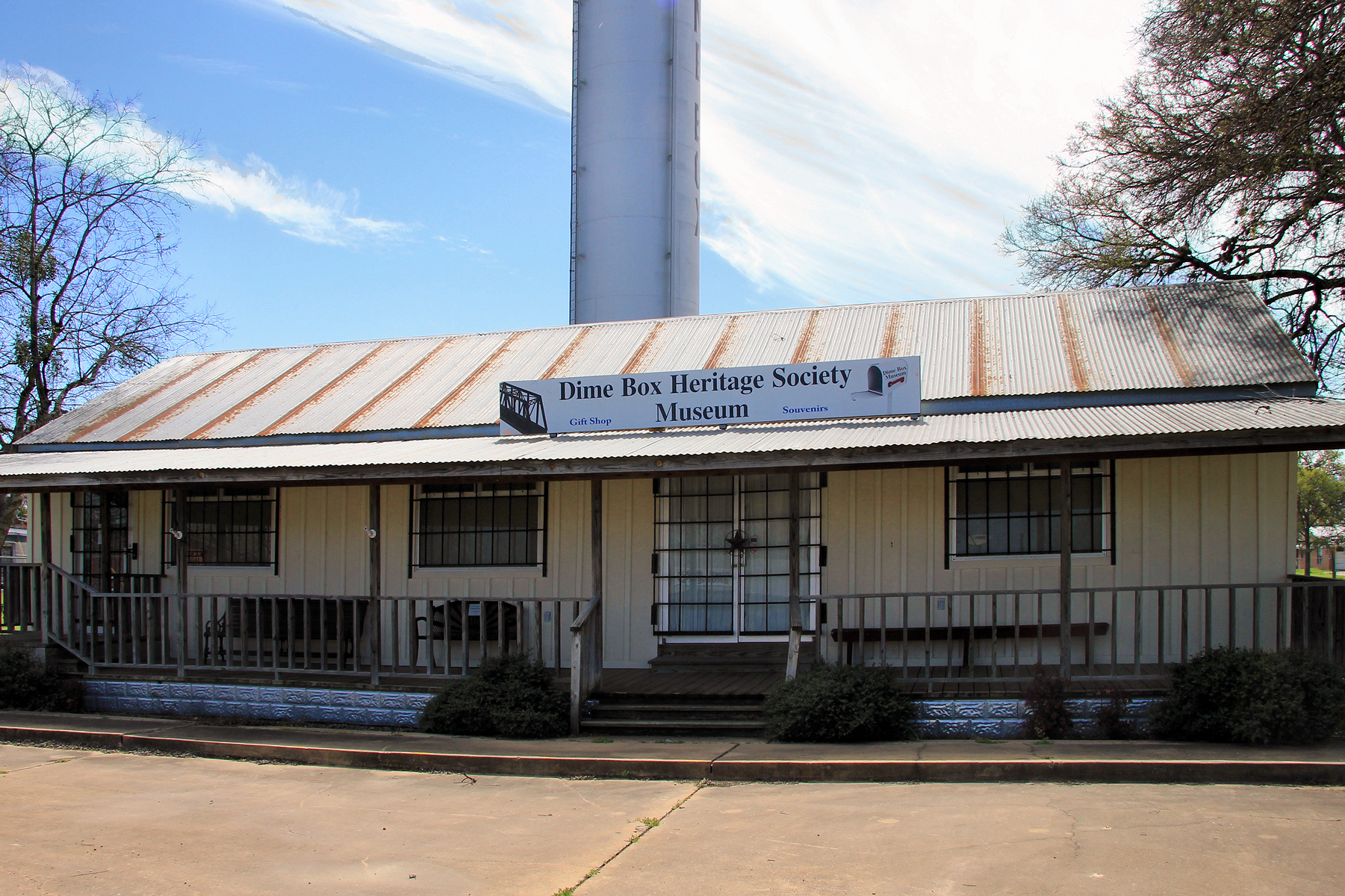
- Dime Box Heritage Society Museum

- Location in Texas Location in the United States
- Coordinates: 30°21′24″N 96°49′21″W
- Country: United States
- State: Texas
- County: Lee

Area
  - Total: 0.72 sq mi (1.86 km^{2})
- Elevation: 371 ft (113 m)

Population (2020)
  - Total: 207
  - Density: 288/sq mi (111/km^{2})
- Time zone: UTC-6 (Central (CST))
  - Summer (DST): UTC-5 (CDT)
- GNIS feature ID: 1334366

Dime Box is an unincorporated community and census designated place in Lee County, Texas, United States. As of the 2020 census, Dime Box had a population of 207. The Dime Box Independent School District serves area students and is home to the Dime Box High School Longhorns. It is named after what is now called Old Dime Box .

== History ==
In 1913, the Southern Pacific Railroad built a line three miles southeast of the original location of Dime Box. Most of the residents and businesses moved to a site near the tracks. From that point onward, the original settlement became known as Old Dime Box and the new community was referred to as Dime Box.

== Climate ==
The climate in this area is characterized by hot, humid summers; generally mild to cool winters; and precipitation evenly distributed throughout the year. The Köppen climate classification describes the weather as humid subtropical.

== Demographics ==
Historical population
Census	Pop.	Note	%±
2020	207		—
U.S. Decennial Census; 1850–1900 1910; 1920 1930 1940; 1950 1960 1970; 1980 1990 2000; 2010 2020

Dime Box first appeared as a census designated place in the 2020 U.S. census.

=== 2020 census ===
Dime Box CDP, Texas – Racial and ethnic composition Note: the US Census treats Hispanic/Latino as an ethnic category. This table excludes Latinos from the racial categories and assigns them to a separate category. Hispanics/Latinos may be of any race.
Race / Ethnicity (NH = Non-Hispanic)	Pop 2020	% 2020
White alone (NH)	108	52.17%
Black or African American alone (NH)	28	13.53%
Native American or Alaska Native alone (NH)	0	0.00%
Asian alone (NH)	0	0.00%
Native Hawaiian or Pacific Islander alone (NH)	0	0.00%
Other race alone (NH)	0	0.00%
Mixed race or Multiracial (NH)	4	1.93%
Hispanic or Latino (any race)	67	32.37%
Total	207	100.00%

== In fiction ==
- Dime Box was cast as the capital of the Second Republic of Texas in Howard Waldrop's book Texas-Israeli War: 1999.
- The opening scene of the Swan Song episode of Walker, Texas Ranger was set in Dime Box.

== In popular culture ==
- Dime Box was visited by author William Least Heat-Moon as described in his book Blue Highways. Heat-Moon got a haircut from local barber Claud Tyler.
