= Dime Box Independent School District =

School district in Texas

Address
- 1079 Stephen F. Austin Boulevard Dime Box, Texas, 77853; United States

District information
- Grades: PK–12
- Schools: 1
- NCES District ID: 4817130

Students and staff
- Students: 150 (2023–2024)
- Teachers: 19.53 (on an FTE basis)
- Student–teacher ratio: 7.68:1

Other information
- Website: dimeboxisd.net

Dime Box Independent School District is a public school district based in the community of Dime Box, Texas (USA). The district has one school Dime Box School that serves students in grades kindergarten through twelve.

In 2009, the school district was rated "academically acceptable" by the Texas Education Agency.
