= Cortland County Courthouse =

- U.S. National Register of Historic Places
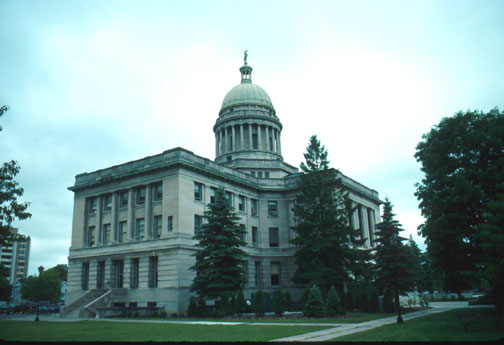
- Cortland County Courthouse, 1993

- Location within New York Location within the United States
- Interactive map showing the location for Cortland County Courthouse
- Location: Courthouse Park, Cortland, New York
- Coordinates: 42°35′56″N 76°10′37″W
- Area: 3 acres (1.2 ha)
- Built: 1924
- Architect: Gordon, James Riely
- Architectural style: Beaux Arts
- NRHP reference No.: 74001228
- Added to NRHP: October 9, 1974

Cortland County Courthouse is a historic courthouse located at Cortland in Cortland County, New York. It was built in 1924 and is a three-story building in the shape of a Latin cross built of Indiana limestone. It is located within a three-acre park. It features a distinctive cupola and corresponding rotunda, which rests on an octagonal base, above which are 24 Corinthian columns. It was designed by James Riely Gordon in the Beaux Arts style.

It was listed on the National Register of Historic Places in 1974.

== Description ==
In the shape of a Latin cross, the courthouse has a 3-bay wide front on the north facade. Atop the doorway including the second and third stories is a veranda with Doric columns — single columns at each end and 2 interior pairs of columns. Also, engaged columns intrude the window treatment of the second and third floors on the east and west elevations. The building is covered with a low-slung hip roof. In the year of 1969, asphalt shingles superseded the original slate. The roof cornice's top consists of a parapet that is of Indiana limestone also. The exceptional architectural characteristic of this establishment is its cupola, which lies on a balustraded octagonal base atop which are 24 Corinthian columns. Afterwards, the modillions of the structure's cornice are repeated in proper scale. There is a 4-inch concrete-made dome over the top of the order. The dome is overlaid with copper and 16-inch steel-arc beams meeting at a circular opening in the top. The statue of justice stands on the Ionic-column finial above the drum. The primary attraction of the interior is the dome. There is a rotunda towering the dome within the structure. The second and third floors’ columned verandas ignore the rotunda. Inside of the dome contains a coffered ceiling of plaster with a stained glass skylight covering the central opening. Marble wainscoting is set up throughout the courthouse. A one-story circular limestone war monument which is constructed of 8 columns and a roof is directly in front of the central gateway on the north facade.

== Significance ==
The Cortland County Courthouse is the third courthouse of the county. Famous architect James Riley Gordon designed the courthouse. It is considered significant by the locals because it is a public architecture that is influenced by the design of the National Capital. The position of the Cortland County Courthouse, the plot of the old Normal School, was mainly based on the locations of its 2 predecessors. All 3 buildings were constructed on or adjoining West Court Street, within around 2 and one-half blocks of each other, and close to the geographic center of Cortland city. The notable characteristic of the courthouse is its cupola and corresponding interior rotunda. As Cortland County Courthouse is the imitation of the U.S. Capitol, it mirrors both the grandeur in public buildings of the period and the fancy of copying a national model on the local level.
