= James Riely Gordon =

American architect

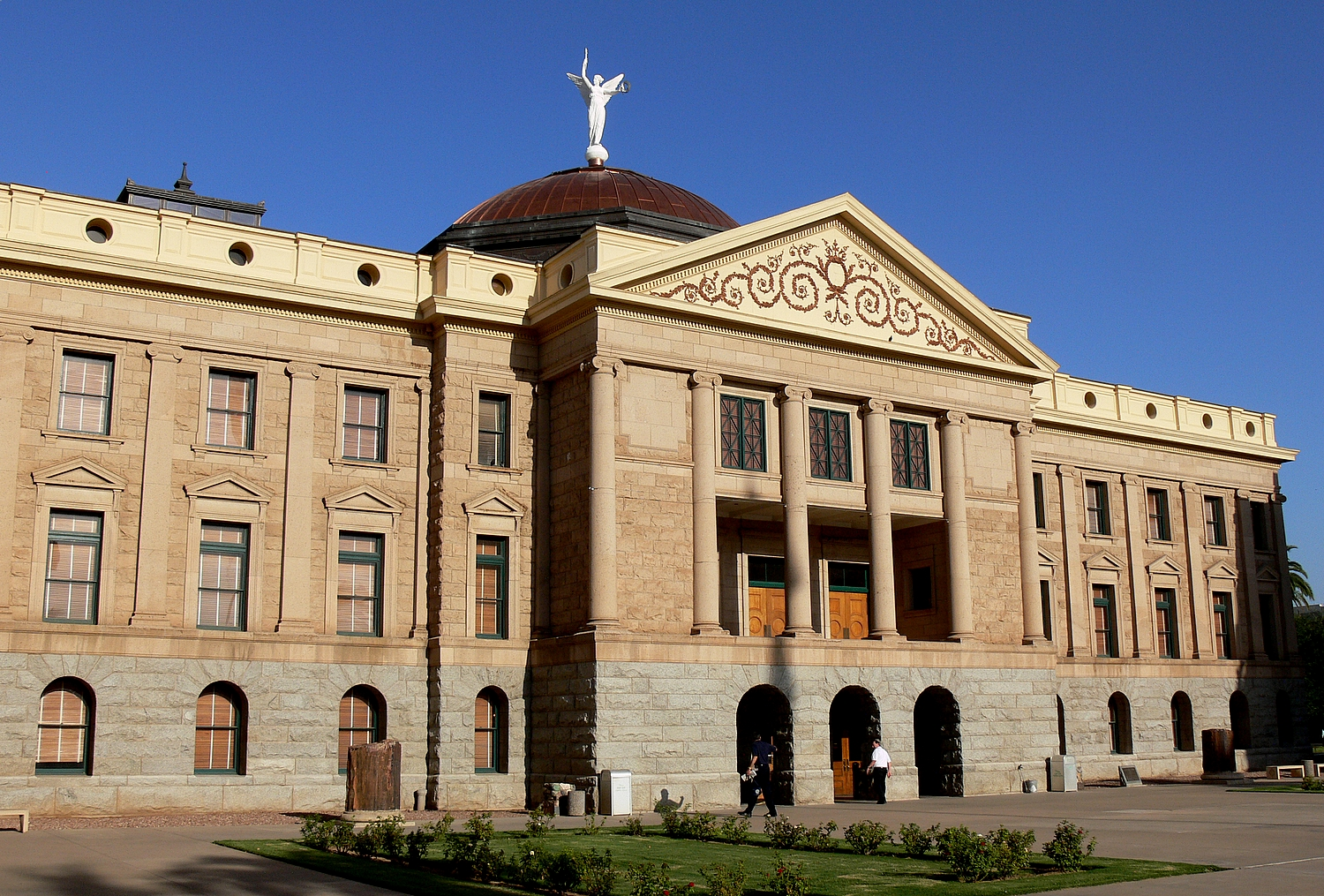
- Arizona State Capitol Building; Designed by James Riely Gordon
- Born: August 2, 1863; Winchester, Virginia, US
- Died: March 16, 1937 (aged 73); Pelham, New York, US
- Other name: J. Riely Gordon
- Occupation: Architect
- Known for: Historic courthouses
- Spouse: Mary Lamar Sprigg
- Children: One daughter

James Riely Gordon (August 2, 1863 – March 16, 1937) was an architect who practiced in San Antonio until 1902 and then in New York City, where he gained national recognition. He is best known for his landmark county courthouses, in particular those in Texas. Working during the state's "Golden Age" (1883–1898) of courthouse construction, Gordon saw 18 of his designs erected from 1885 to 1901; today, 12 remain.

== Early life ==
Gordon was born in Winchester, Virginia, to George Muir and Sarah Virginia (Riely) Gordon. When he was 11, his family moved to San Antonio. At 16, he began working in the engineering office of the International and Great Northern Railroad.

In 1882, Gordon apprenticed to W.K. Dobson of San Antonio. Soon after, Gordon went to work for the Office of the Supervising Architect of the Treasury, the agency responsible for the design of federal court buildings, customs houses, post offices, etc. In 1887, he returned to San Antonio to supervise construction of that city's U.S. Post Office and Courthouse (replaced in 1937). Gordon was essentially self-educated in his art, learning on his jobs, but never attending a school of architecture.

In 1891, Gordon and his then-partner, D.E. Laub, won first prize of $1,000 in a country-wide competition to design the new Bexar County Courthouse; shortly afterward, they ended their partnership. The building met with popular acclaim.

== Architectural career ==
=== Texas and the South ===
J. Riely Gordon's specialty while practicing in Texas was public buildings, though he also designed houses and commercial structures. He became a master of the Romanesque Revival style that had been introduced to great acclaim by Henry Hobson Richardson with his Trinity Church in Boston in 1877. Returning to the roots of the style in the medieval Auvergne Region of France, Gordon is said to have "out-Richardsonianed Richardson" with his finest Romanesque works in Decatur and Waxahachie, Texas.

Gordon's most successful plan—apparently his own unique design, without precedent—was that of a Greek cross with a square central atrium and stairwell, and quarter-circular entrance porches in each corner. This Signature Plan of his captured the passing breeze, which lifted thru the central atrium like a chimney, providing a natural ventilation system. Putting the entrances in the corners also shortened the hallways, saving space. He built 11 courthouses of this type in Texas between 1891 and 1900.

His masterpiece is the Ellis County Courthouse in Waxahachie, which has become the icon of the town-square, late Victorian Era genre. The massive building tapers to 134 feet at the peak of the central clock tower, atop a vast roof punctuated by dormers. It took two million bricks, "160 carloads of Texas granite, 100 carloads of Pecos red sandstone, used in trimming the building, and 14 cars of iron". The pyramidal mass is softened by decorations such as carved faces of people and animals (apparently by the accomplished artisan Harry Herley), as well as multicolored stones and bricks, and metal eagles perched on spirelets above the roof.

After he won commissions for courthouses in Hazelhurst (Copiah County) and Woodville (Wilkenson County) in Mississippi, political shenanigans cheated Gordon out of a commission for that state's new capitol. Later, Gordon fought hard to win the contract for a new city hall in Vicksburg, then the state's largest city. Like his proposed design for the capitol, the luscious-looking city hall featured curving rows of columns. Gordon got some satisfaction from the crooked state politicians with this "graceful, dignified, and architecturally fine" building in Vicksburg that flaunts its Beaux-Arts beauty on a crest above the Mississippi River.

Using his design for the Mississippi capitol, Gordon won the commission for the Arizona Territorial Capitol building in Phoenix, which became the state capitol when Arizona was admitted to the Union in 1912; today, it is a museum. Another notable building was the award-winning Texas Pavilion at the 1893 World's Columbian Exposition in Chicago.

=== New York and the East ===
In 1902, Gordon moved his practice to Dallas, and then in 1904 to New York City. For a few years there, he was in partnership with architects Evarts Tracy and Egerton Swartwout.

Gordon designed a number of substantial buildings in Manhattan, but almost all of them have since been replaced by new structures. One venerable survivor from 1910, in the Gramercy Park area, is the apartment house 36 Gramercy Park East. With a soaring pair of stacked bay windows, it is clad in white terra cotta, like Cass Gilbert's Woolworth Building of the same period.

While apartment houses and commercial buildings dominated Gordon's practice in New York City, he did see more courthouse work, in Somerville and Hackensack, New Jersey, Oakland, Maryland, Ebensburg, Pennsylvania, and Wampsville and Cortland, New York.

The significance of his role in the New York area may be inferred from the fact that his obituary in the New York Times failed to even mention the word "Texas".

== Courthouses ==
- Aransas County, TX: Gordon designed the 1889 Aransas County, Texas Courthouse in Rockport in the architectural styles of Renaissance Revival and Moorish Revival. This courthouse was erected at a cost of $19,494, but replaced by a newer courthouse in 1956 and razed in the 1960s.
- Bexar County, TX: Groundbreaking was in 1891, and the Romanesque courthouse was completed in 1896. The courthouse was added to the National Register of Historic Places in 1977. It was designated a Recorded Texas Historic Landmark in 1976.
- Brazoria County, TX: In 1894, Gordon was hired to design a courthouse for Brazoria County in its original county seat of Brazoria. The Richardson Romanesque-style structure was superseded by what is referred to as the Old Brazoria County Courthouse in 1897, when the county seat was moved to Angleton. The courthouse designed by Gordon was demolished in 1930.
- Comal County, TX: The 1899 Romanesque Revival Comal County Courthouse designed by Gordon for New Braunfels was added to the National Register of Historic Places in 1976 and designated a Texas Historic Landmark in 1993.
- Ellis County, TX: Another Richardson Romanesque design by Gordon is in Waxahachie, where the 1897 courthouse appears on the National Register of Historic Places as part of the larger Ellis County Courthouse Historic District. The courthouse itself was designated a Recorded Texas Historic Landmark in 1969.
- Erath County, TX: In 1891, county commissioners awarded Gordon a contract to design the Erath County Courthouse in Stephenville, which was completed in 1892. The Romanesque Revival building was added to the National Register of Historic Places in 1977. It became a Recorded Texas Historic Landmark in 1963.
- Fayette County, TX: Gordon designed the 1891 courthouse in La Grange, which appears on the National Register of Historic Place as the 1975-listed Fayette County Courthouse and Jail and as part of the larger 2001-listed Fayette County Courthouse Square Historic District. The courthouse by itself was designated a Recorded Texas Historic Landmark in 2001.
- Gonzales County, TX: Gonzales is the location of Gordon's 1896 Romanesque Revival Gonzales County Courthouse, which used his characteristic Greek cross layout, with corner entrances and a soaring rotunda. It was added to the National Register of Historic Places in 1972 after becoming a Texas Historic Landmark in 1966.
- Harrison County, TX: Old Harrison County Courthouse in Marshall was designed by Gordon in the Beaux-Arts and Renaissance Revival styles, and erected in 1900 of marble, granite, and other stone. It was added to the National Register of Historic Places in 1977. The courthouse was designated a Texas Historic Landmark in 1965.
- Hopkins County, TX: Hopkins County Courthouse in Sulphur Springs is the only structure in Hopkins County on the National Register of Historic Places. It was added in 1977. The 1895 structure was designed by Gordon in the Romanesque Revival style at a cost of $75,000. It was designated a Texas Historic Landmark in 1975.
- Lee County, TX: Gordon's Lee County Courthouse in Giddings was added to the National Register of Historic Places in 1975. This Romanesque Revival building was constructed of red brick in 1899 and designated a Texas Historic Landmark in 1968.
- McLennan County, TX: The Beaux Arts Classicism-style McLennan County Courthouse in Waco was completed in 1902 and added to the National Register of Historic Places in 1978.
- Van Zandt County, TX: The Van Zandt County Courthouse in Canton, dedicated in 1896, was one more of Gordon's Romanesque buildings, but it was razed in 1936 for the current courthouse. The site was designated a Texas Historic Landmark in 1986.
- Victoria County, TX: Gordon designed the Old Victoria County Courthouse located in Victoria, Texas, in 1892. It was added to the National Register of Historic Places in 1977, and was designated a Texas Historic Landmark in 1961.
- Wise County, TX: County commissioners awarded a design contract in 1895 to Gordon for the Wise County Courthouse located in Decatur. Construction was completed in 1897. It was added to the National Register of Historic Places in 1976, and designated a Texas Historic Landmark in 1964.
- Garrett County, MD: In Oakland, Maryland, the Garrett County Courthouse used Gordon's trademark plan with corner doors and a ventilating atrium-like lobby. Using drawings prepared in 1907, in neoclassical Renaissance Revival style, it was listed on the National Register of Historic Places in 1975.
- Bergen County, NJ: Another surviving work from Gordon's New York period is the Bergen County Court House at 10 Main St, Hackensack, New Jersey. Its cornerstone was laid July 6, 1910, and the building completed in 1912. Designed in the [Beaux Arts architecture|Beaux-Arts] style that reflects monuments of classical Rome and Italian Renaissance.

== Other buildings ==
Among Gordon's nonpublic work in Texas is the 1890 Protestant Home for Destitute Children at 802 Kentucky Ave in San Antonio. The building was designated a Recorded Texas Historic Landmark in 1991. The Stevens Building, which Gordon designed at 315 E. Commerce, received the Recorded Texas Historic Landmark designation in 1984. It was added to the National Register of Historic Places the same year.

In Seguin, Texas, near San Antonio, the Nolte family hired Gordon to build the E. Nolte & Sons Bank (now a Wells Fargo branch) facing the town square (designed 1890, finished 1896). It is part of the National Register listing of Seguin's commercial district. Its façade has been greatly altered over the years. For Eugene Nolte, Gordon also designed a house with Queen Anne-style massing and a rare-in-Texas Shingle-style exterior (circa 1895), just across the street from the back of the bank, at 102 E. Live Oak Street and the corner of S. Austin St. Today, the 19-room mansion is owned by the H.A. Daniels family of Seguin, whose family purchased the home from Mrs. Eugenie (Claudia) Nolte around 1940. Photographs and Gordon's records of this house, including two photographs of its interiors, are housed at the Alexander Architectural Archives, University of Texas Libraries, the University of Texas at Austin . More photographs of this house are also available at the Institute of Texan Cultures archives housed among the Eugene Nolte papers at the University of Texas at San Antonio.

James Riely Gordon also designed a number of notable houses for wealthy clients in Gonzales, Texas. There, he not only designed the courthouse, but also at least three homes. In 1895, for lumberman J.B. Kennard he designed 621 St. Louis St. in Queen Anne style. The home of James F. Miller at 121 St. Joseph St., known as Walnut Ridge, was completed in 1901. Gordon also supplied the design for the 1911 house of D.S. Dilworth, a banker and businessman.

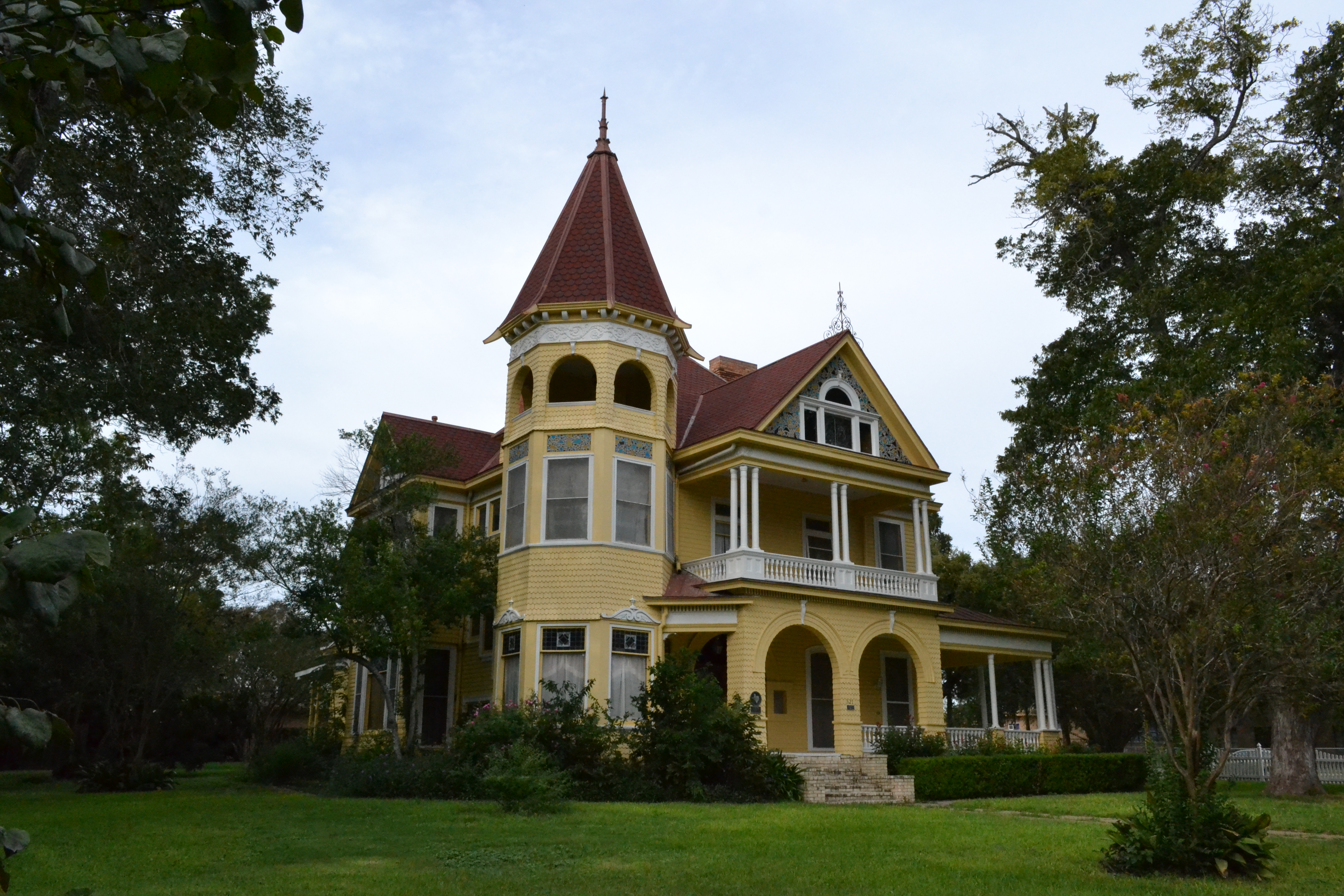
The 1895 J.B. Kennard House by J. Riely Gordon is a National Register property.

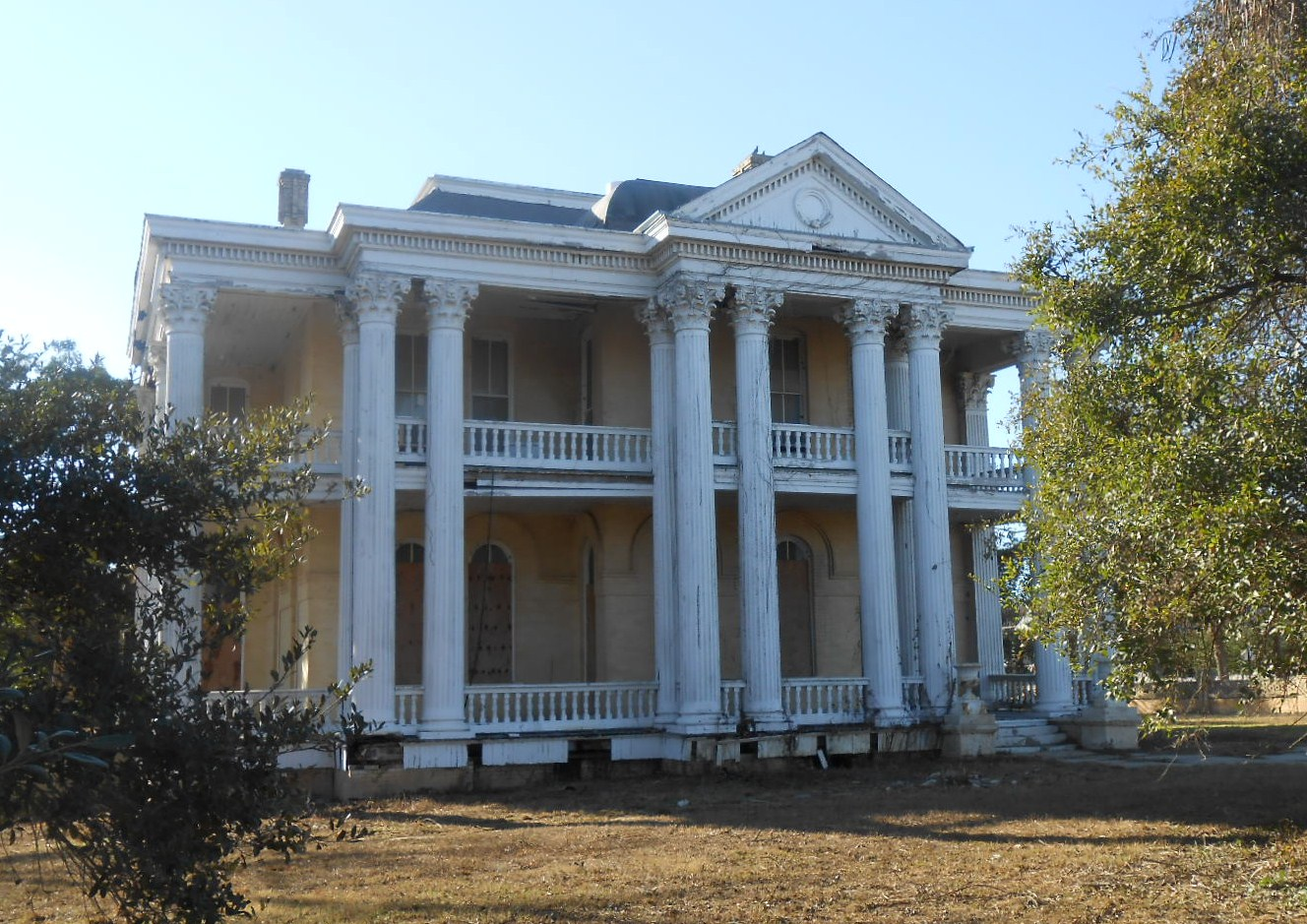
Despite many years of neglect by its owners, Walnut Ridge remains a structurally sound landmark at the southern entrance to downtown Gonzales, Texas.

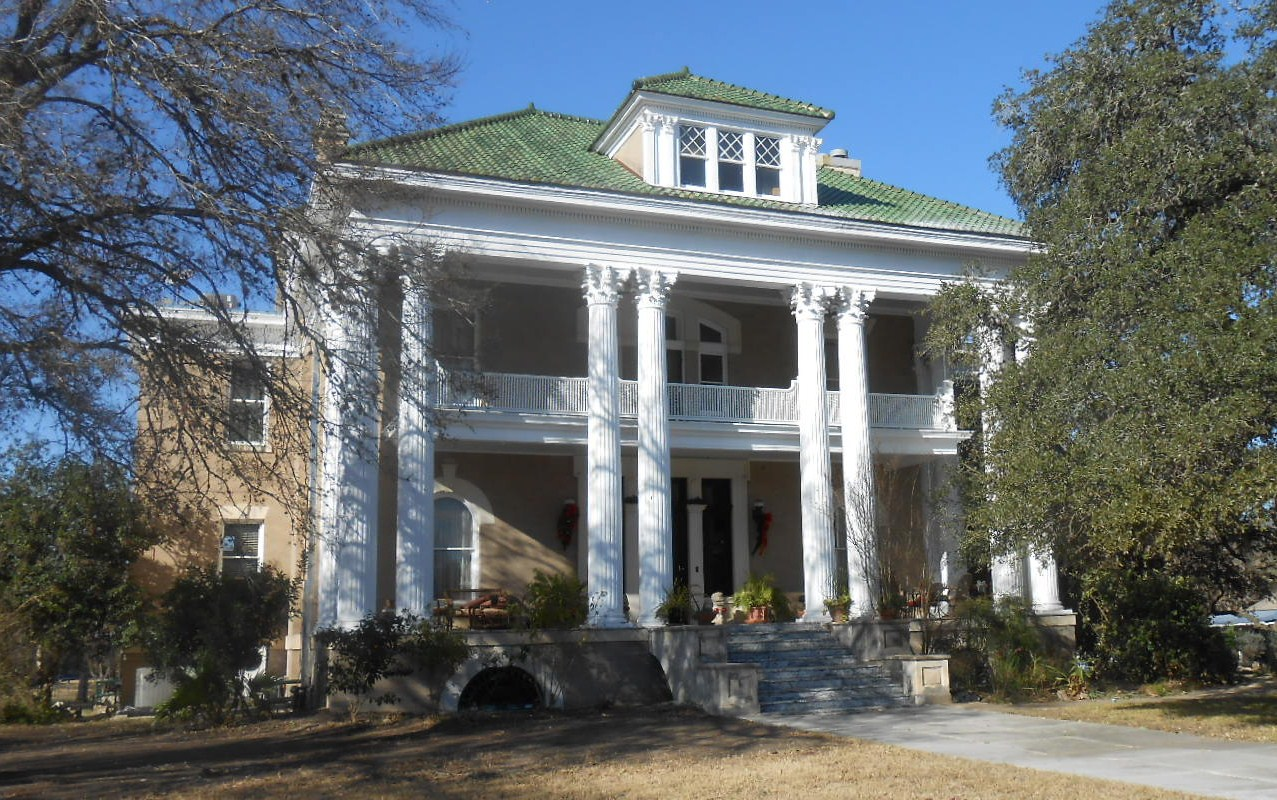
The R.S. Dilworth House at 903 St. Lawrence St., Gonzales, Texas, was built in 1911 using St. Louis pressed brick and eight massive Corinthian columns.

Gordon designed the Staacke Brothers Building at 309 E. Commerce St. for the carriage trade of August Frederick Staacke in 1894. The building became a Recorded Texas Historic Landmark in 1984. The Staacke building was added to the National Register of Historic Places in 1980.

One surviving Gordon house, at 425 King William St. in San Antonio's heavily German-American King William District, was built for George Kalteyer (1892–1893). The house is known as "The Kalteyer House" and has been a home to many different families over the years. Gordon designed a cottage in 1890 for August Thiele, Jr., a San Antonio business and civic leader. It has been listed since 1983 on the National Register of Historic Places as part of the Thiele House and Thiele Cottage. The cottage itself was designated a Recorded Texas Historic Landmark in 1984. The Queen Anne-style Thomas H. Franklin House was designed by Gordon and built in 1891 for a local attorney. It was added to the National Register in 1986.

Gordon's designs are also represented in the Monte Vista Residential Historic District, featured on the National Register of Historic Places since 1998. The showplace home that Gordon designed for real estate developer Jay E. Adams stands at 505 Belknap today.

== Personal ==
In 1889, Gordon married Mary Lamar Sprigg. The couple had one daughter.

Gordon served 13 years as the president of the New York Society of Architects before being named its honorary president. He also served on a number of important city boards and official committees.

He died of a stroke on March 16, 1937. His funeral featured a tribute by the president of the New York Society of Architects, and was attended by some 50 other architects.

Gordon's papers are now held in the Alexander Architectural Archive of the University of Texas Libraries.

In 2011, Chris Meister's book James Riely Gordon: His Courthouses and Other Public Architecture became the first scholarly study of Gordon's career and major works.

== Gallery ==
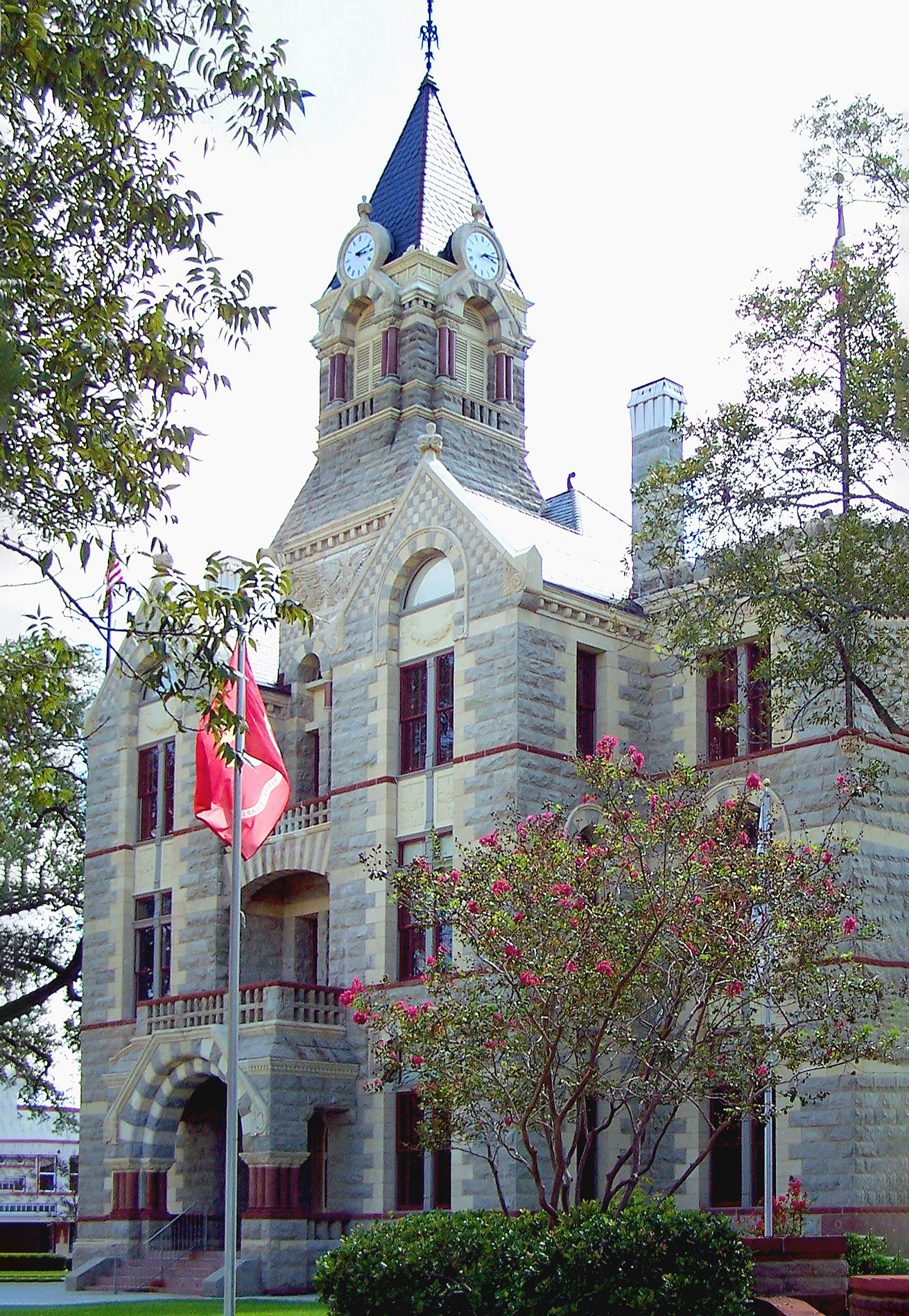
The Fayette County Courthouse in La Grange, between Houston and Austin, was finished in 1891. The Romanesque Revival building uses four types of native Texas stone to detail the exterior.

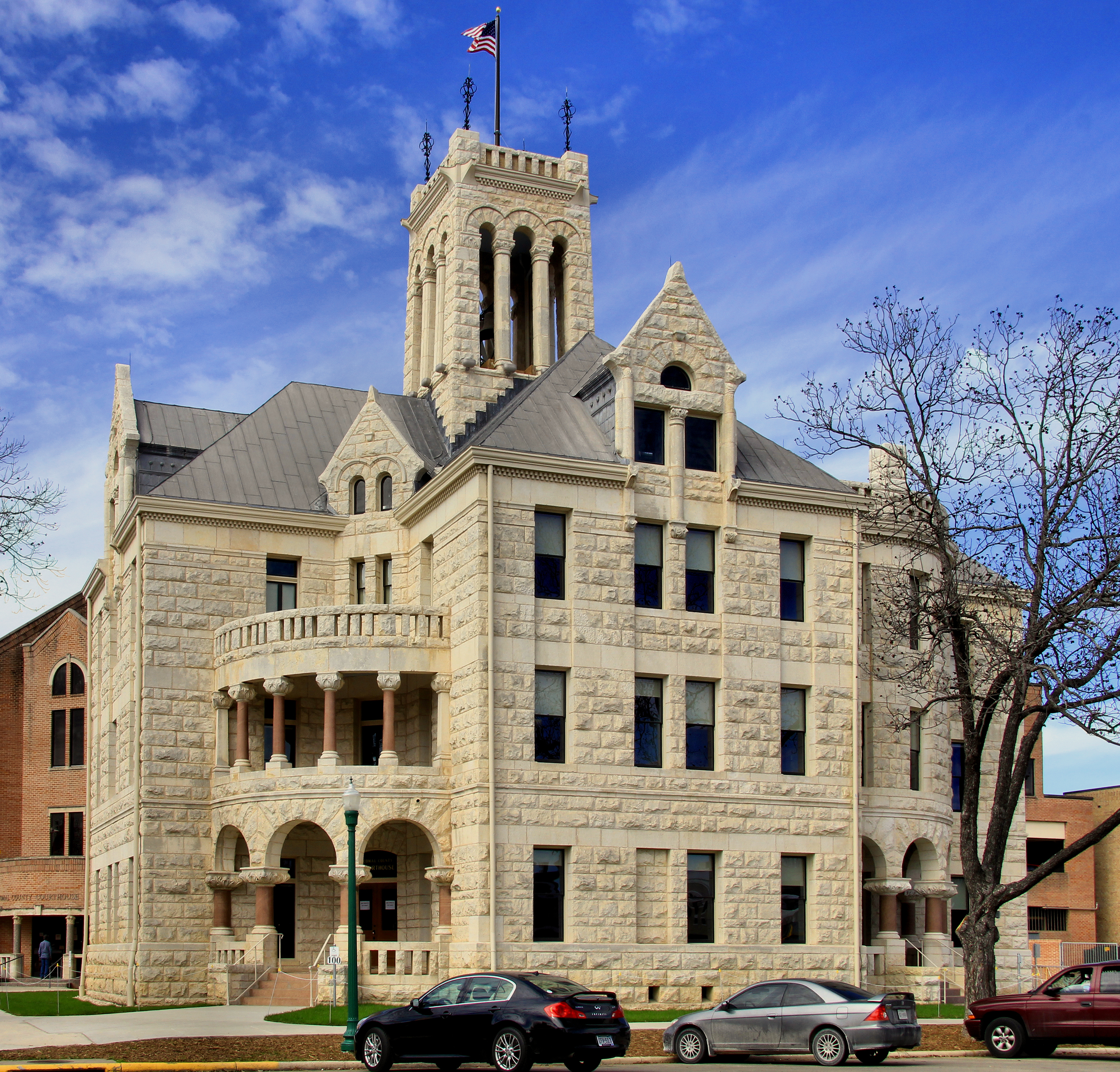
Comal County's 3 1/2-story Romanesque Revival courthouse, from 1898 and recently restored, faces the square in New Braunfels, between San Antonio and Austin.

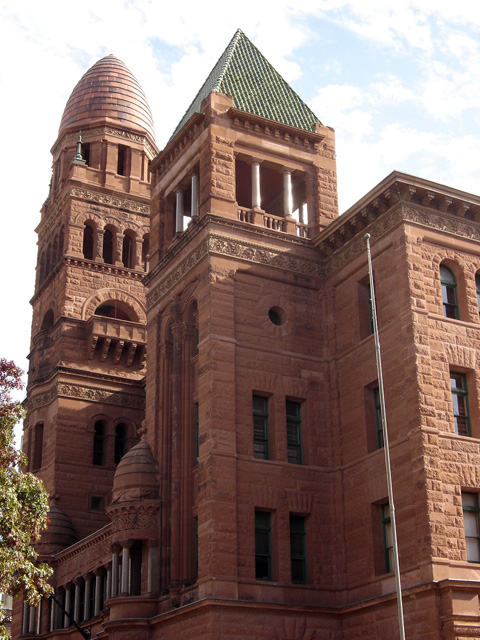
The Bexar County Courthouse in downtown San Antonio, Texas, United States, an exuberant example of Romanesque Revival, built in 1892, launched Gordon's career.

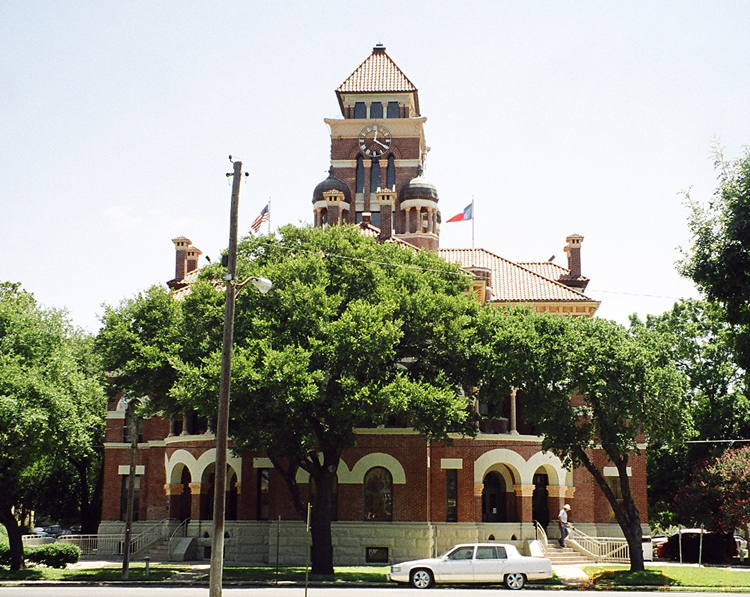
Gonzales County Courthouse. One of the first examples of Gordon's Signature style, featuring corner entrances and an atrium, the Second Empire-style building, built to drawings made in 1890, was placed on the National Register in 1972.

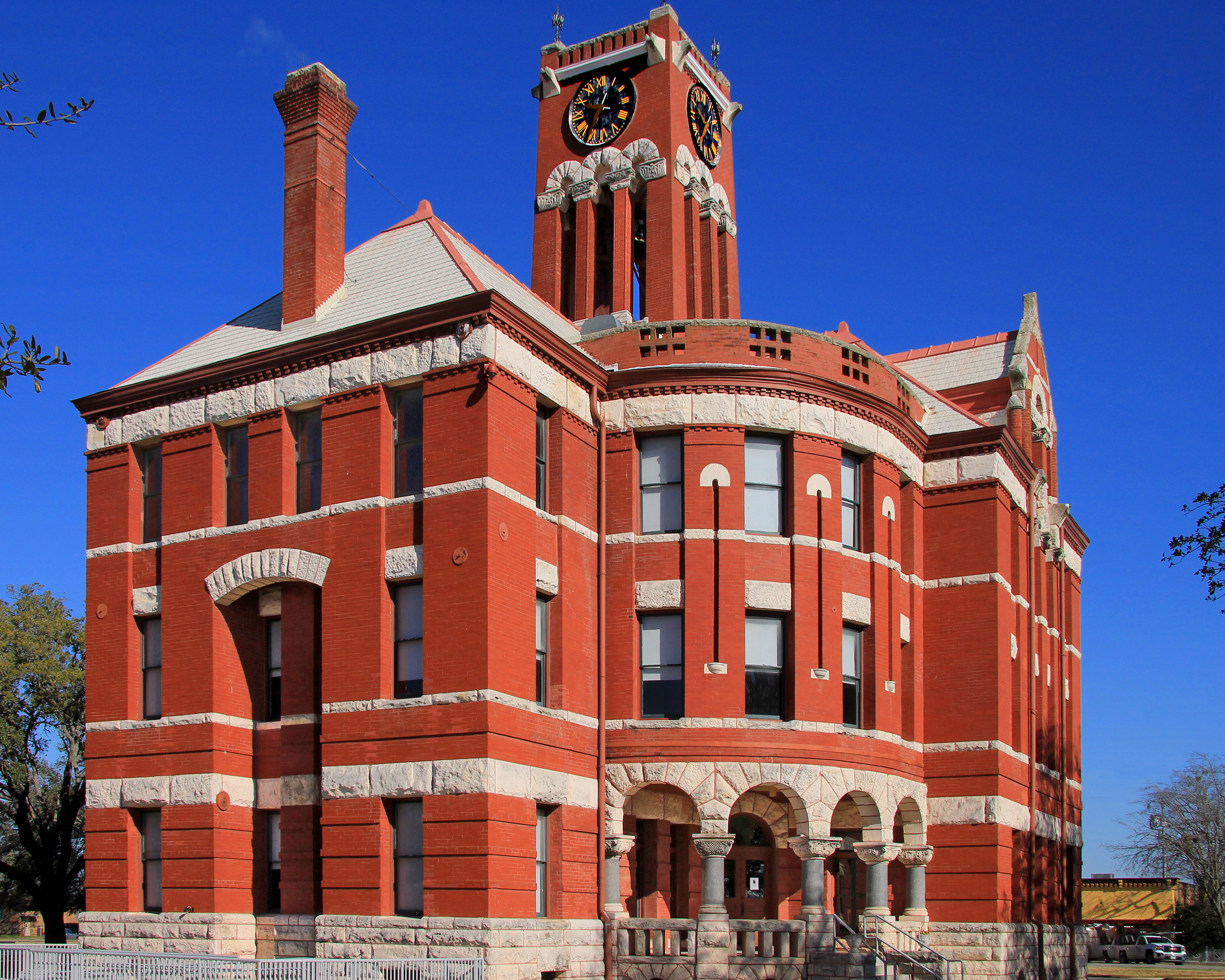
Lee County Courthouse in Giddings, near Austin, built in 1899, was designed in the Richardsonian Romanesque style.

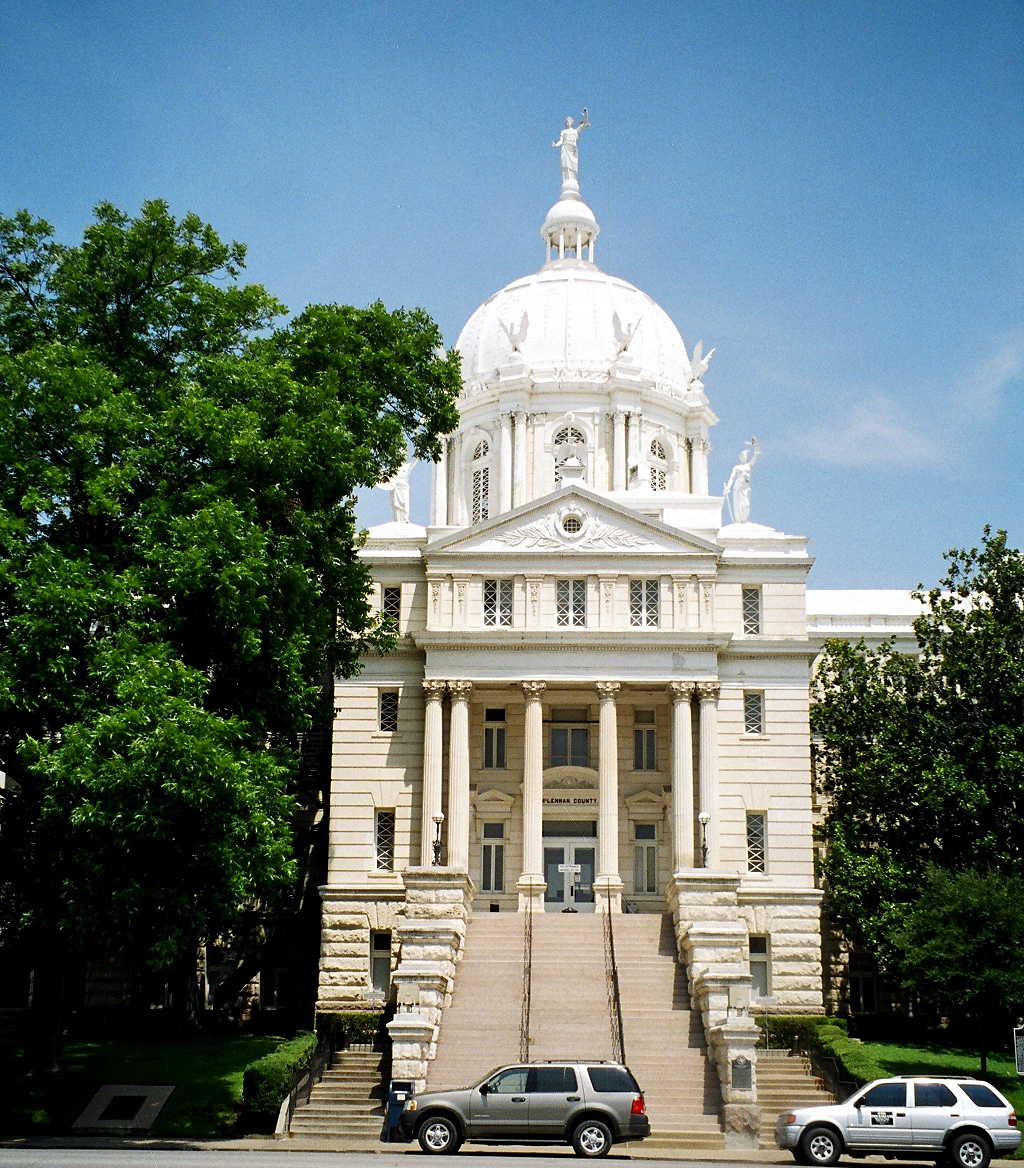
McLennan County Courthouse in Waco, shows Gordon's mastery of the Beaux-Arts style. Added to National Register in 1978.

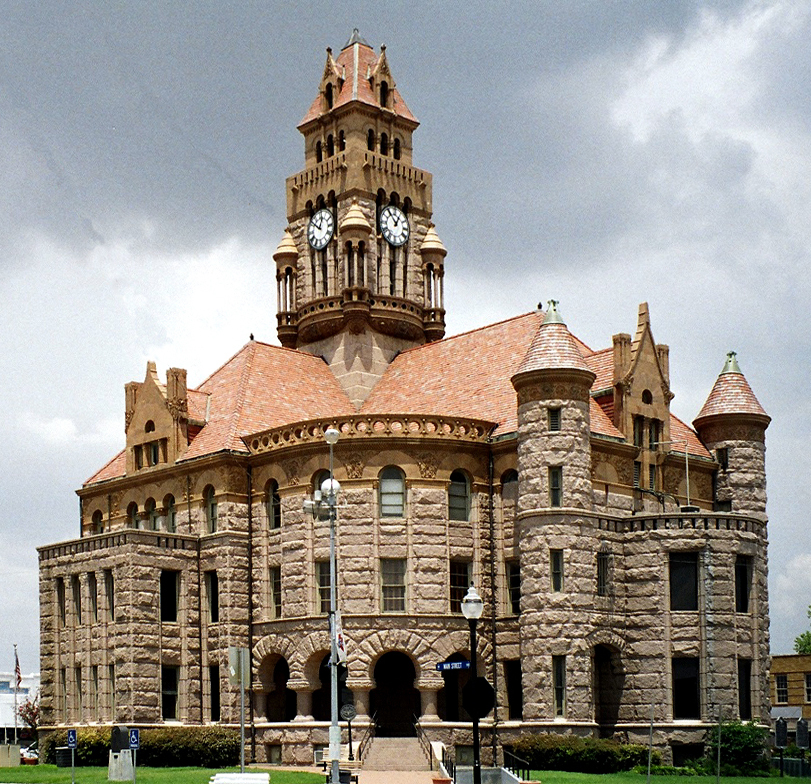
Wise County Courthouse in Decatur. The Romanesque Revival structure was added to the National Register in 1976.

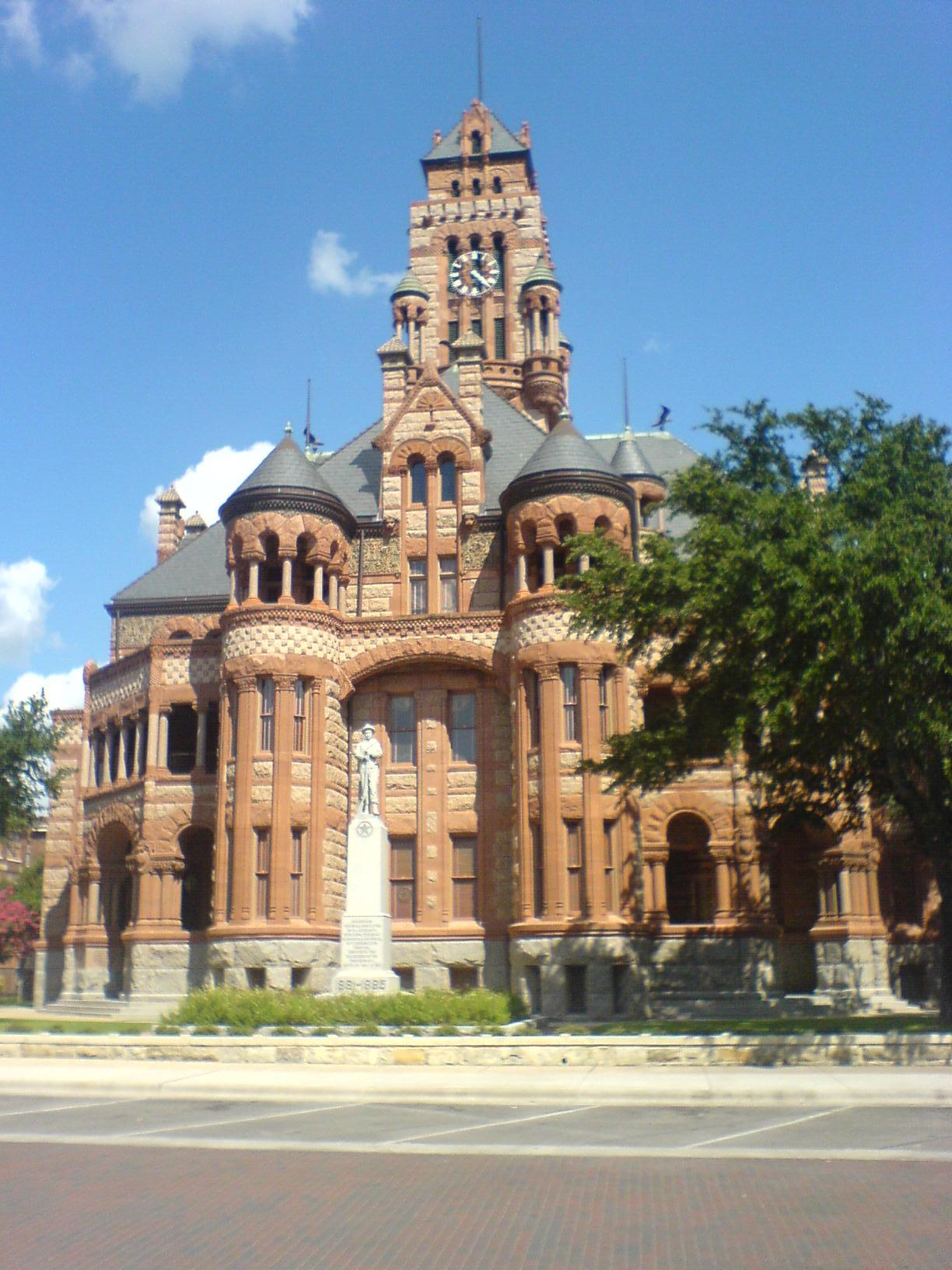
Ellis County Courthouse in Waxahachie, south of Dallas, is one of the most impressive and most beloved architectural landmarks in Texas.

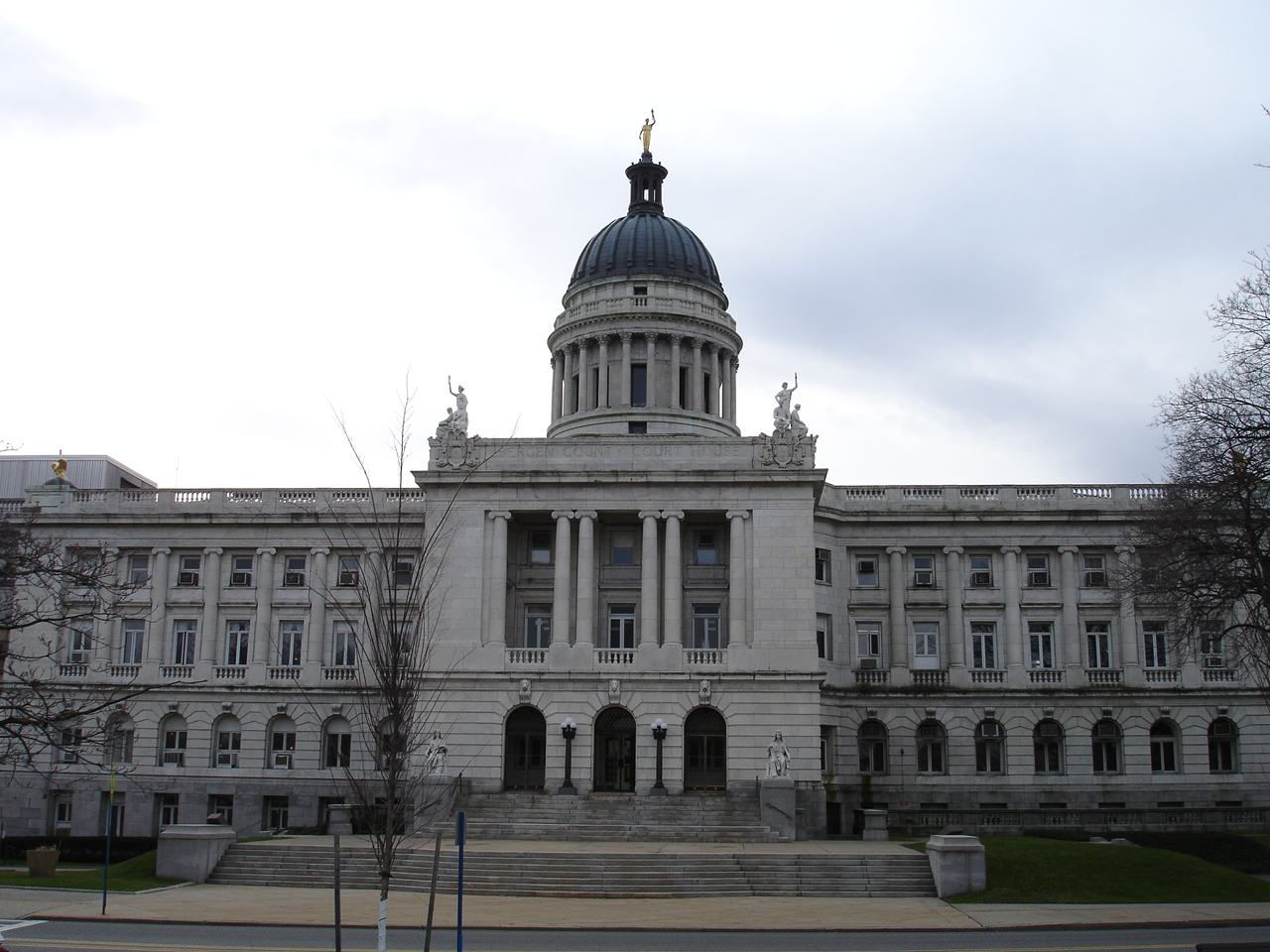
Bergen County Court House designed in American Renaissance, and built in Hackensack, N.J. in 1910. Added to the National Register on January 11, 1983.

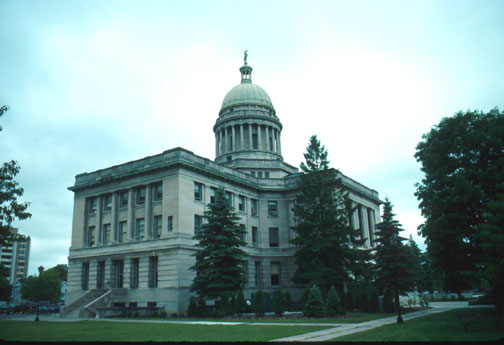
Cortland County Courthouse, built 1922-1923 in Cortland, New York, was listed on the National Register in 1974.
