= Lee County Courthouse (Texas) =

- U.S. National Register of Historic Places
- Texas State Antiquities Landmark
- Recorded Texas Historic Landmark
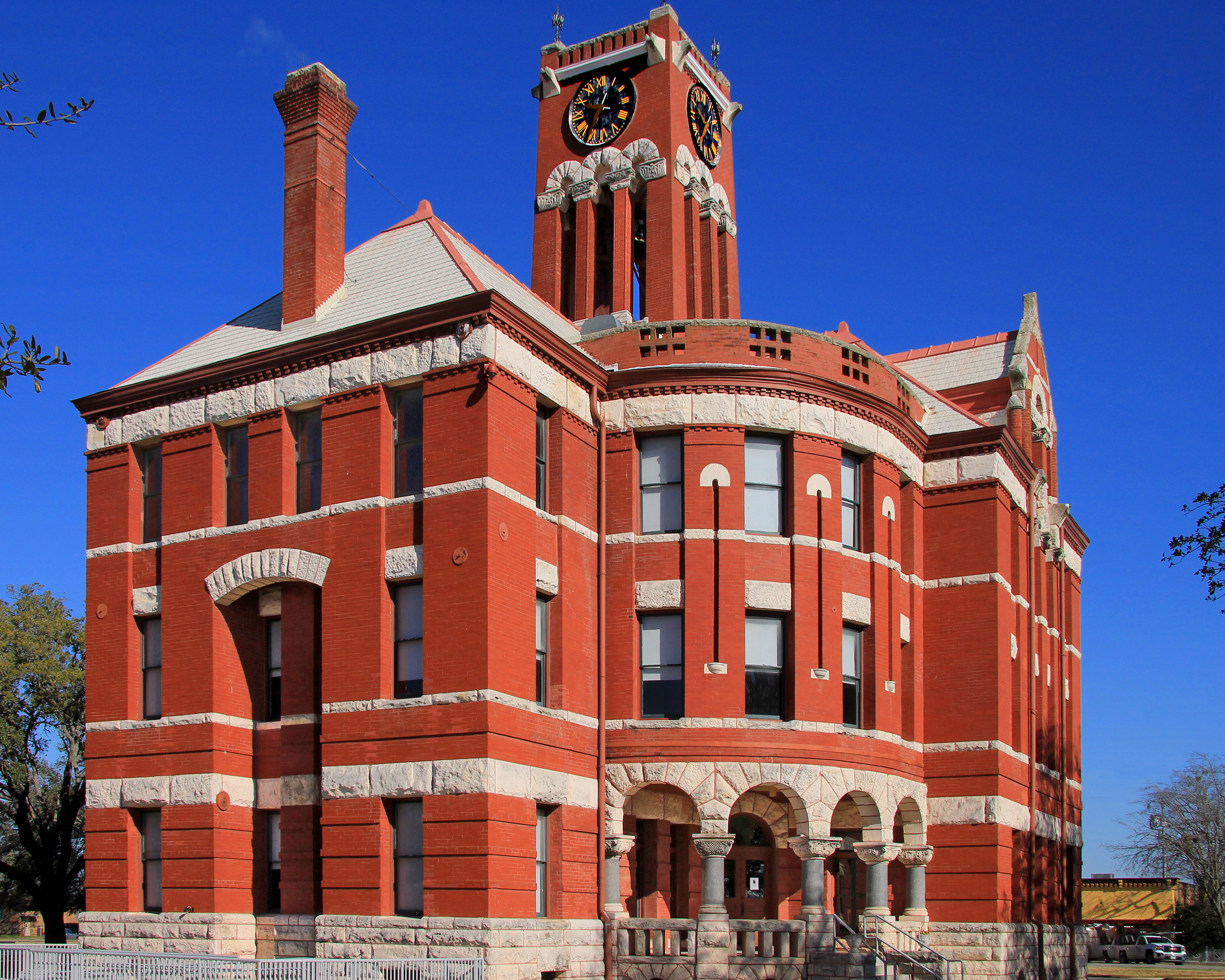
- Lee County Courthouse in 2014

- Location within Texas Location within the United States
- Location: Bounded by Hempstead, Grimes, E. Richmond, and Main Sts., Giddings, Texas
- Coordinates: 30°10′53″N 96°56′14″W
- Area: 1 acre (0.40 ha)
- Built: 1898-1899
- Built by: Sonnefield, Emmins and Abright
- Architect: J. Riely Gordon
- Architectural style: Richardsonian Romanesque
- NRHP reference No.: 75001998
- TSAL No.: 8200000432
- RTHL No.: 8166

Significant dates
- Added to NRHP: May 30, 1975
- Designated TSAL: January 1, 1981
- Designated RTHL: 1968

The Lee County Courthouse is a Texas State Antiquities Landmark, is a Recorded Texas Historic Landmark, and is listed on the National Register of Historic Places.

The first Lee County Courthouse was built in 1878 in Second Empire style, but was destroyed by fire in 1897. The new courthouse, built in 1898, was designed by architect J. Riely Gordon in Richardsonian Romanesque style.

== See also ==
- National Register of Historic Places listings in Lee County, Texas
- Recorded Texas Historic Landmarks in Lee County
- List of county courthouses in Texas
