= Seguin, Texas =

City in, Texas, United States

- City
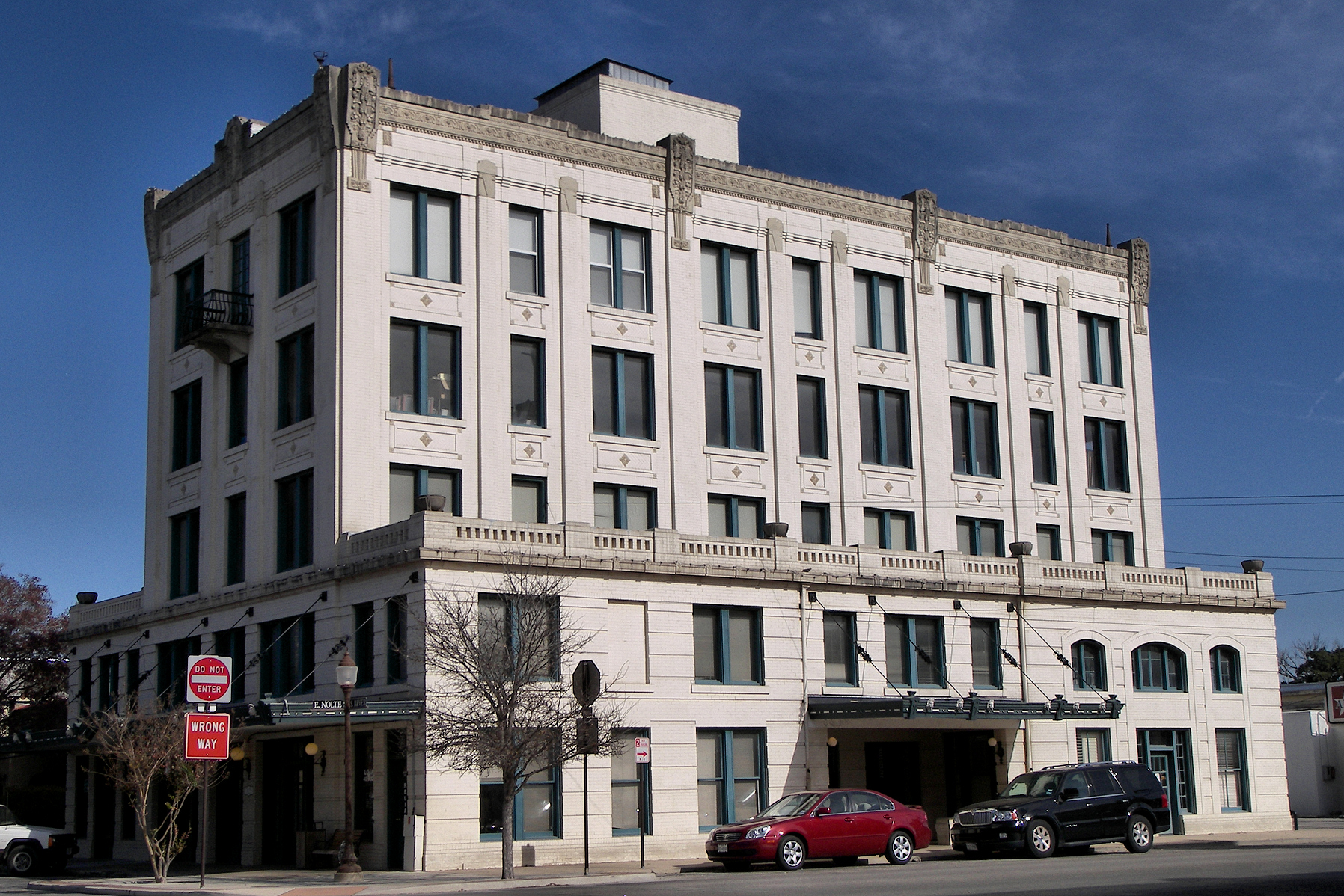
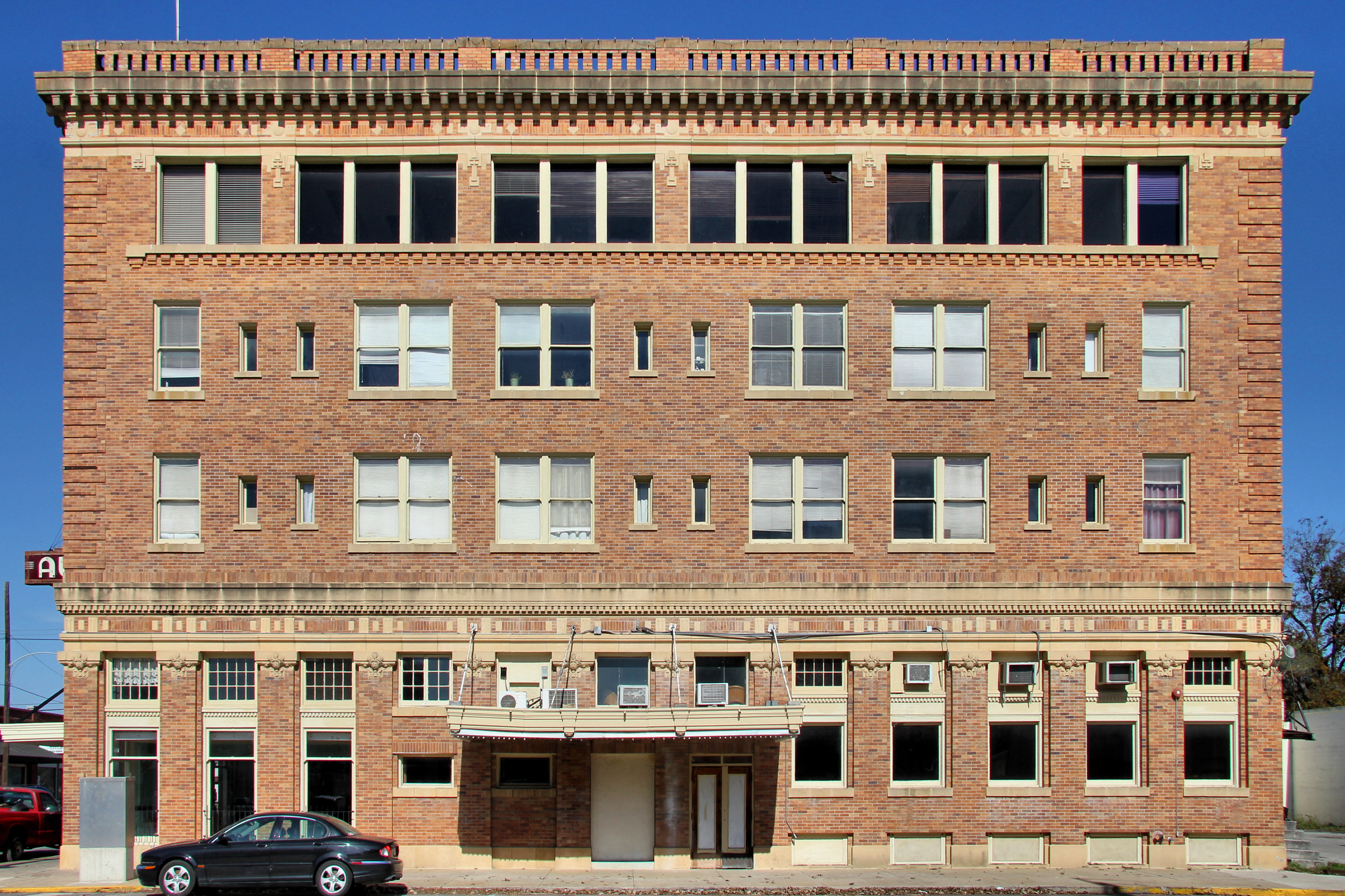
- Park Plaza Hotel, Seguin's tallest downtown building. Bottom: The 1916 Aumont Hotel is part of the National Register of Historic Places; the 2nd-tallest building in downtown Seguin.

- Location of Seguin in Guadalupe County, Texas
- Coordinates: 29°37′40″N 97°57′42″W
- Country: United States
- State: Texas
- County: Guadalupe
- Founded: August 12, 1838
- Incorporated: 1853

Government
  - Type: Council-Manager

Area
  - Total: 40.224 sq mi (104.180 km^{2})
  - Land: 40.026 sq mi (103.666 km^{2})
  - Water: 19.752 sq mi (51.157 km^{2})
- Elevation: 558 ft (170 m)

Population (2020)
  - Total: 29,433
  - Estimate (2023): 36,013
  - Rank: TX: 102nd
  - Density: 900/sq mi (347.4/km^{2})
- Time zone: UTC–6 (Central (CST))
  - Summer (DST): UTC–5 (CDT)
- ZIP Codes: 78155–78156
- Area code: 830
- FIPS code: 48-66644
- GNIS feature ID: 2411860
- Sales tax: 8.25%
- Website: seguintexas.gov

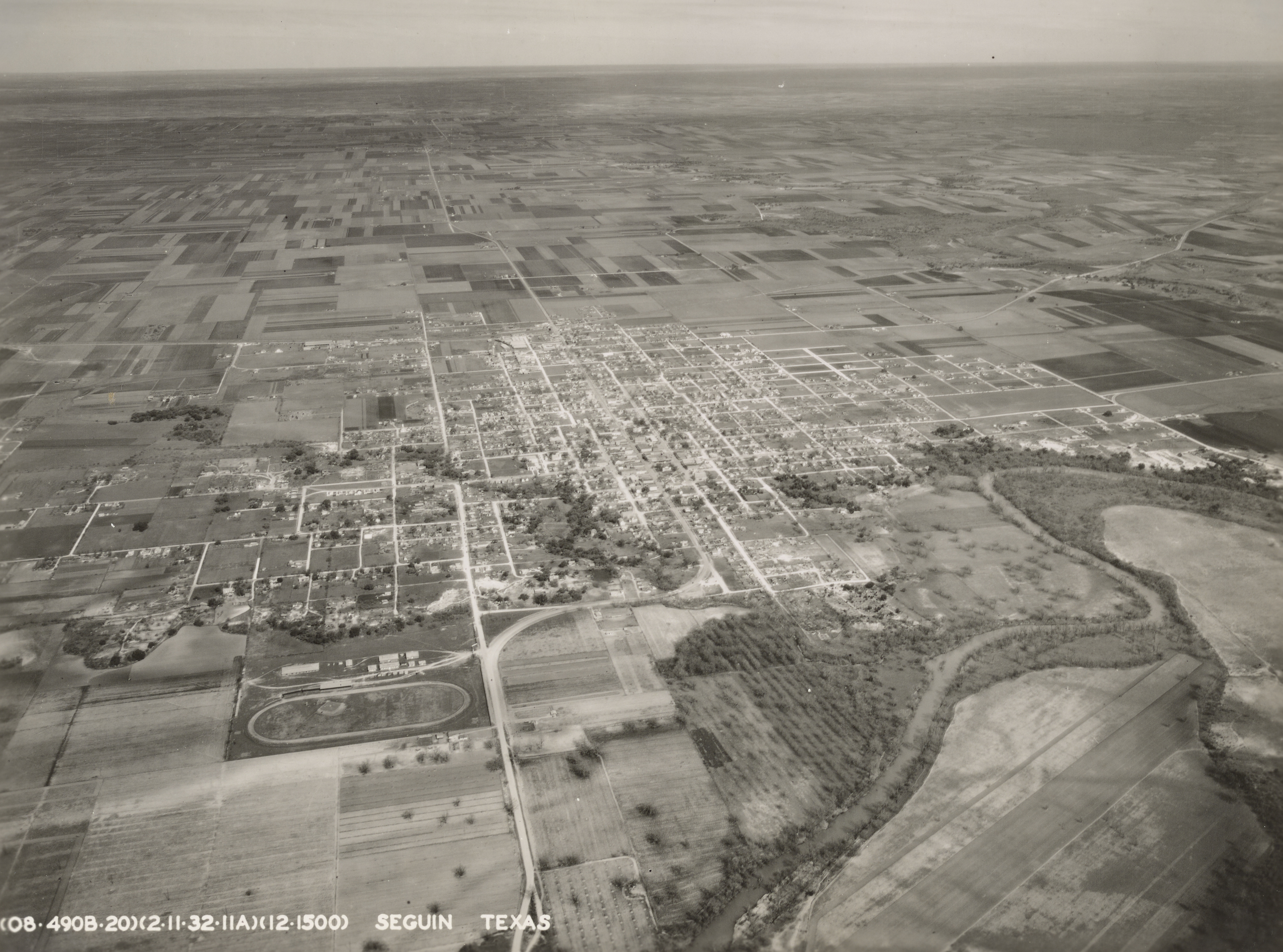
Seguin in 1932

Seguin (/sɪˈɡiːn/ sih-GHEEN) is a city in and the county seat of Guadalupe County, Texas, United States. Its population was 29,433 at the 2020 census, and according to 2023 census estimates, the city had a population of 36,013.

== Description ==
Seguin's economy is primarily supported by a regional hospital, as well as the Schertz-Seguin Local Government Corporation water utility that supplies the surrounding greater San Antonio areas from nearby aquifers as far as Gonzales County. Several dams in the surrounding area are governed by the main offices of the Guadalupe-Blanco River Authority, headquartered in downtown Seguin.

Seguin, named in honor of Juan Seguín, a Tejano Texian freedom fighter and early supporter of the Republic of Texas, is one of the oldest towns in Texas, founded just 16 months after the Texas Revolution began. The frontier settlement was a cradle of the Texas Rangers and home to celebrated Captain Jack Hays, perhaps the most famous Ranger of all. At that time, the Seguin area was a part of Gonzales County, the remaining portion known as present-day Belmont. The Rangers had found this was a good halfway stop between their patrol points. It had been maintained as a base camp by the Rangers since the early founding of the Dewitt Colony.

== History ==
Seguin was the home of Dr. John E. Park, who experimented in construction using concrete made from local materials. The nearly 100 structures—the courthouse, schools, churches, homes, cisterns, walls, etc.—made up the largest concentration of early 19th-century concrete buildings in the United States. About 20 of them remain standing.

The use of concrete largely ended when the railroad arrived in 1876, bringing cheap lumber and the equipment needed for brickmaking. The town had five brickworks, and the wooden buildings of downtown were completely replaced with brick by the beginning of World War I.

For almost 100 years, the town was dependent on the rich surrounding farmland and ranches. Then, the Texas oil boom came just as the Great Depression was taking down other towns and cities. The town commemorated its centennial by opening Max Starcke Park, with a golf course, a pavilion, picnic tables, and BBQ pits along a scenic river drive, and a curving dam that created a waterfall.

To preserve some of the historic character of the town, Seguin became one of the state's first Main Street cities, and the downtown district was placed on the National Register of Historic Places. Fine homes by leading architects J. Reily Gordon, Solon McAdoo, Leo M.J. Dielman, Atlee B. Ayers, and Marvin Eickenroht dating from the late 19th century and the first half of the 20th century can be found on many streets. However, the city does not have any officially designated historic residential districts.

The postwar era had industrial development, including a small mill that turned scrap metal into construction products.

In 1972, Motorola built a plant to manufacture automotive electronics. It was bought by Continental AG in 2006, became Vitesco Technologies in 2021, acquired by Schaeffler in 2024, and is the city's largest employer with 1,750 employees. Caterpillar opened a diesel engine assembly plant in 2008 which is the second largest employer.

=== Prehistory ===
The Seguin area was once inhabited by the native hunter-gatherer Native Americans of Texas. An ongoing archeological dig indicates campgrounds dating back 10,000 years or so, with trade items from Mexico and Arizona. The early visitors may have come to gather pecans, because the native trees bearing the nut thrive in the river bottoms of the Guadalupe. By the time the first European explorers passed through, predominantly Tonkawas lived in the area, camping around the Guadalupe and other streams in the area. Eventually, Spanish, Mexican, and Anglo settlers started farms and ranches in the location that became Seguin.

=== Early history ===
José Antonio Navarro, one of the earliest settlers and an important figure of Texas history, developed a ranch near Seguin. In 1831, land was granted to Umphries Branch by the Mexican government. The Branch and John Newton Sowell Sr. families settled in 1833 in the western part of Green DeWitt's colony. Sowell was a farmer, and in 1833, his brothers and he became the first Anglo-American immigrants to raise corn in future Guadalupe County.

Between 1827 and 1835, 22 families came to the area as part of the DeWitt Colony; by 1833, 40 land titles were in the region, 14 of which received grants directly from the Mexican government. In 1836, John Gladden King lived near Seguin. His farm neighbored the Sowells on the northwest and Branch on the southeast. A son, William Philip King, reportedly was part of a cannon crew and was the youngest defender killed during the Battle of the Alamo. These homesteads were abandoned in the Runaway Scrape.

=== Old Seguin ===
The town of Seguin was founded August 12, 1838, 16 months after Texas won its independence at the Battle of San Jacinto, making it one of the oldest towns in Texas. Members of Mathew Caldwell's Gonzales Rangers acquired land originally granted to Umphries Branch, who had departed during the Runaway Scrape and sold his land to Joseph S. Martin.

At this time, the Seguin area was a part of Gonzales County, the remaining portion known as present-day Belmont. The Rangers had found this was a good halfway stop between their patrol points. The grove of live oaks had become a familiar location. It had been maintained as a base camp by the Rangers since the early founding of the Dewitt Colony.

=== 19th-century history ===
Under an ancient live oak, 33 Rangers signed the charter for the town. Many were surveyors who joined Joseph Martin in laying out the lots for the town. Its original name was Walnut Springs, but was changed just six months later to honor San Jacinto veteran and then a senator of the Republic of Texas, Juan Seguín. The surveyors' plan for the city included a main north–south street that ran straight and flat for a mile and more. The streets form a grid, around a central square of two blocks, today's Courthouse Square and Central Park, formerly known as Market Square.

A tree called the Whipping Oak grows across from the courthouse. In the 19th century, runaway slaves and criminals were bound to an iron ring embedded in the tree, then whipped as a punishment.

Manuel Flores, veteran of San Jacinto and brother-in-law of Juan Seguin, established a ranch just south of Seguin in 1838. It became a safe-haven for San Antonio families and a staging point for counterattack when Bexar was overrun in 1842 by Santa Anna's forces under Ráfael Vásquez and Adrian Woll.

Leading the resistance forces from this location was Texas Ranger John Coffee "Jack" Hays. When duty allowed, Hays was a familiar resident of Seguin. In 1843, Hays set up a gathering point at the Walnut Branch Ranger Station in Seguin, where the classic Ranger character was born. He met Susan Calvert, whose father owned the Magnolia Hotel, where they married in April 1847.

Serving under Hays were two other famous Ranger residents of Seguin: Henry and Ben McCulloch. Their home known as Hardscramble still stands and was designated a Texas State Centennial historic site in 1936. Colonel James Clinton Neill, commander of the Alamo, was known to be buried here. The site was also historically marked during the 1936 Texas Centennial Exposition.

Seguin was named the county seat, and Guadalupe County was organized, early in 1845, as Texas became a state. The first county judge was Michael H. Erskine. The town was incorporated in 1853, and a city government was organized under acting Mayor John R. King, until elections were held later that year and John D. Anderson became the first elected mayor.

A few years later, another town was laid out on the west side of Seguin, on land that had been titled by Alamo defender Thomas R. Miller, and sold in 1840 to Ranger James Campbell in partnership with Arthur Swift and Andrew Neill. This area became part of Seguin within a few years, but 150 years later, the east–west streets still do not match up to cross through the old Guadalupe Street border.

When Prince Carl of Solms-Braunfels and his German colonists were making their way in 1845 to the land they had bought to settle, Calvin Turner and Asa Sowell from Seguin were hired to guide them. Later, Seguin became a stopping point and trade center for German immigrants along their route from the ports of Indianola and Galveston to the German settlements around New Braunfels and Fredericksburg. Many Germans en route heard of the hard times in those Hill Country settlements and decided, instead, to buy land and settle around Seguin.

After Texas became a state, many settlers arrived from the Old South, bringing in hundreds of slaves in total, though only a few plantation owners held more than a dozen slaves. Most of the slaves lived on small farms with their owners, who remained subsistence farmers for years after settling their land. The contributions of African Americans to building the community are all but ignored in local histories written during the period when slavery was still being excused as justifiable due to the alleged low development of those enslaved. In fact, for the first 50 years or so, and probably for the first 100 years of the town, blacks did most of the construction work, including the main concrete buildings, such as Sebastopol.

Education was important to the town. By 1849, it had chartered a school. The first schoolhouse was built in 1850; it burned and was soon replaced by a two-story limecrete building. This Guadalupe High School, now a part of the St James Parochial School, was recognized by a historical marker in 1962 as the oldest continuously used school building in Texas.

Seguin was home to Dr. John E. Park's concrete (limecrete). Called "the Mother of Concrete Cities" in the 1870s, the town once had nearly 100 structures made of limecrete, including the courthouse, schools, churches, houses, cisterns, and many walls. So many limecrete walls and corrals were built that Seguin gave the effect of being a walled city. This was the largest and most significant concentration of 19th-century concrete buildings in the U.S. About 20 of these vintage buildings survive today.

In 1857, Frederick Law Olmsted, later famous as the landscape architect of New York's Central Park, toured Texas, writing dispatches to the New York Times. Olmsted exclaimed at the concrete structures he found here, almost on the edge of the frontier, and described the city as "the prettiest town in Texas."

One surviving concrete home, the Sebastopol House; built in 1856, is a Texas Historical Commission landmark and is on the National Register of Historic Places due to its unusual limecrete construction and architectural style.

Stagecoaches began to serve the town in 1848, connecting coastal ports to San Antonio and points west. The Magnolia Hotel was an overnight stop for the exhausted, hungry, and dirt-covered riders. A young slave had the duty of standing on a stone to pull the bell rope alerting the community to the arrival of the stage, which brought visitors, the mail, newspapers, and special merchandise. Heading west from the Magnolia, the stage route went through town, passing the courthouse. Today, a mural commemorates its path. During the Great Depression, workers from the Civilian Conservation Corps traced part of the route with stone walls, showing how it moved downhill, crossed Walnut Branch (a spring-fed tributary of the Guadalupe River), and climbed the other side.

The historic Wilson Pottery site is on Capote Road, near Seguin. The pottery was the first successful business in Texas owned and operated by freed slaves, beginning in 1869.

During Reconstruction, the freed slaves in Seguin organized their own congregation, the Second Baptist Church, and in 1876, a school that came to be known as the Lincoln School. In 1887, they established Guadalupe College, comparable to a junior college today, with a heavy concentration on vocational education. These institutions were begun with the help of Rev. Leonard Ilsley, an abolitionist minister from Maine, but William Baton Ball, himself an ex-slave, Union soldier in the Civil War, and former Buffalo Soldier, became their leader. He was greatly assisted by his friend and benefactor George Brackenridge of San Antonio. (The main buildings of Guadalupe College burned due to a boiler malfunction during a bitterly cold night in 1936, and the college ended.)

The railroad reached Seguin in 1876 en route to San Antonio, when the oldest railway in Texas, the Galveston, Harrisburg and San Antonio Railroad, chartered on February 11, 1850, as the Buffalo Bayou, Brazos and Colorado Railway Company built the first Seguin depot. It became part of the Southern Pacific Railroad, and now the main southern line of the Union Pacific.

John Ireland was mayor of Seguin in 1858. Elected the 18th Governor of Texas 1883–1887, he had an important part in the construction of the Texas State Capitol—insisting on using native stone, red granite from the Hill Country, instead of limestone imported from Indiana. He also presided over the opening of the University of Texas at Austin.

=== 20th-century history ===
From before the Civil War until at least World War II, cotton was the money crop of the local farms, and the county had at least a dozen gins, with three in the town of Seguin, but agriculture was more diversified than in many counties where cotton was king, with corn, peanuts, hogs, and cattle, as well as wheat, oats, sugarcane, and most notably, pecans. The tiny native nuts were an early export. The crops improved as the bottomlands were converted to orchards, and eventually bigger varieties of nuts were grafted onto the local trees. This was one of the first counties to have a pecan growers' association, and in 1921, its leader, P.K. DeLaney, helped start the Texas Pecan Growers Association. The county remains one of the state's leading producers. Seguin has been called 'a big orchard with a small town in it' because almost every house is shaded by a pecan tree in the yard. A tribute to the nut's importance is "the World's Largest Pecan" erected on the courthouse lawn.

Small mills were put on the Guadalupe River even before the Civil War. William Saffold established a mill at what is today Max Starcke Park. Later, Henry Troell made major improvements there, and in 1894, used hydroelectric power to light the town. The City of Seguin took over the dam and electric plant in 1907. The supply of cheap and reliable electricity helped to make possible several gins, mills, silos, an ice plant and ice cream maker, a cold meat-storage facility, and other types of agribusiness.

In 1912, citizens of Seguin lured a struggling church school to the city with cash and 15 acres of land donated by Louis Fritz. It grew to a junior college and then into a four-year college to become today's Texas Lutheran University, with some 1,400 students and boasting high rankings on the U.S. News & World Report comparisons of universities.

During this time, Texas State Architect Atlee Ayres designed several commercial, public, and residential buildings in Seguin. In 1912, he designed the Starcke Furniture Company, the Seguin High School building (Mary B. Erskine School, 1914), the Aumont Hotel (1916), Langner Hall at Texas Lutheran University, and the Blumberg and Breustedt mansions.

During the 1920s, the county began to enjoy a foretaste of an oil boom. While the first fields were at the far edge of the county, near Luling, the paperwork of deeds and leases (as well as any resulting lawsuits) passed through the Guadalupe County Courthouse. Then in December 1929, the Darst Creek Field was opened, only 15 miles east of Seguin. (The creek had been named for colonist and landowner Jacob C. Darst. He was one of the original "Old Eighteen", defenders of the Gonzales cannon and then a member of the Gonzales Ranging Company relief force to the Alamo during the siege in 1836.)

With the Darst Field, Seguin became a supply center, and residents were able to rent out rooms to oilfield workers for cash even during the worst years of the depression of the 1930s. As a result, Seguin was able to collect taxes when other towns just had to give up. It used the money to match federal grants for what some derided as "make-work" projects. Under the leadership of the popular mayor, Max Starcke, Seguin was transformed, with a new post office, a new Art Deco City Hall, courthouse, jailhouse and fountain in Central Park, new storm sewers and sidewalks, and a small park along Walnut Branch, with rustic stone walls that protected the historic springs and traced the route of the stagecoach as it headed west through town. The little city had three swimming pools, one for whites, one for blacks at the segregated high school, and one for Spanish-speaking citizens at the Juan Seguin school.

Max Starcke's biggest achievement was a large park along the Guadalupe River, designed by Robert H.H. Hugman, famous now as "the Father of the River Walk" in San Antonio. The park featured a handsome Art Deco recreation building designed by Hugman (now offices) with changing rooms for the swimming pool. The nine-hole course was designed by John Bredemus, a prolific course designer who has been called "the father of Texas golf". The park offered picnic tables and bar-be-que pits between a scenic river drive and the river. Most of all, at a disused mill, Hugman and the young men of the National Youth Administration put a curving dam. As the 1938 dedication marker tells, funds were raised in part by public subscription. Dozens of groups and individuals made contributions to build the park that the town named for its popular mayor, who was moving on to, and soon to head, the Lower Colorado River Authority in Austin.

After World War II, entrepreneurs fresh out of the university used electric furnaces to melt scrap into reinforcing bars with a company then called Structural Metals. The minimill (now CMC Steel) has been joined by manufacturers including Alamo Group, building roadside mowing equipment; Schaeffler (was Vitesco Technologies, Continental Automotive Systems, originally Motorola), making electronic powertrain control modules and emissions sensors; Hexcel, producing reinforcements for composites using glass fiber, carbon fiber, aramids, and specialty yarns; Minigrip, manufacturing re-closeable plastic bags for food and home storage; Tyson Foods, processing chicken. In 2009 Caterpillar opened a plant assembling diesel engines.

== Geography ==
Seguin is located in the center of Guadalupe County. It is 35 miles (56 km) east-by-northeast of downtown San Antonio, on Interstate 10, which serves Seguin with five exits. It is about 50 miles (80 km) south of Austin on Highway 123, via Interstate 35, or 62 miles (100 km) by Highway 130, a toll road.

According to the United States Census Bureau, the city has a total area of 40.224 square miles (104.18 km^{2}), of which 0.198 sq mi (0.51 km^{2}, 0.58%, or 125 acres) is covered by water.

The Guadalupe River flows through the southern side of the city, reaching the Gulf of Mexico south of Victoria.

=== Weather and climate ===
On the northern edge of the South Texas Plains, Seguin enjoys a mild winter. The sunny days of spring bring on spectacular shows of wildflowers from March into June. Like most of Central Texas, it suffers very hot, humid summers from June into September. Then cold fronts pushing down from the north usually trigger precipitation and make October a rainy month, bringing "a second spring" of wildflowers. At their worst, fall and winter have "northers", fast-moving cold fronts with wind, often rain, and rapid drops of temperature, frequently falling 30 °F (17 °C) or more during one day. Northers give way to warm spells, right through the winter.

== Demographics ==
Historical population
| Census | Pop. | Note | %± |
|---|---|---|---|
| 1860 | 792 | | — |
| 1870 | 830 | | 4.8% |
| 1880 | 1,363 | | 64.2% |
| 1890 | 1,716 | | 25.9% |
| 1900 | 2,421 | | 41.1% |
| 1910 | 3,116 | | 28.7% |
| 1920 | 3,631 | | 16.5% |
| 1930 | 5,225 | | 43.9% |
| 1940 | 7,006 | | 34.1% |
| 1950 | 9,733 | | 38.9% |
| 1960 | 14,299 | | 46.9% |
| 1970 | 15,934 | | 11.4% |
| 1980 | 17,854 | | 12.0% |
| 1990 | 18,692 | | 4.7% |
| 2000 | 22,011 | | 17.8% |
| 2010 | 25,175 | | 14.4% |
| 2020 | 29,433 | | 16.9% |
| 2023 (est.) | 36,013 | | 22.4% |
U.S. Decennial Census; Texas Almanac: 1850-2000; 2020 Census

=== Racial and ethnic composition ===
Seguin city, Texas – Racial and ethnic composition Note: the US Census treats Hispanic/Latino as an ethnic category. This table excludes Latinos from the racial categories and assigns them to a separate category. Hispanics/Latinos may be of any race.
| Race / Ethnicity (NH = Non-Hispanic) | Pop 2000 | Pop 2010 | Pop 2020 | % 2000 | % 2010 | % 2020 |
|---|---|---|---|---|---|---|
| White alone (NH) | 7,967 | 8,944 | 10,735 | 36.20% | 35.53% | 36.47% |
| Black or African American alone (NH) | 1,946 | 1,839 | 1,746 | 8.84% | 7.30% | 5.93% |
| Native American or Alaska Native alone (NH) | 56 | 44 | 48 | 0.25% | 0.17% | 0.16% |
| Asian alone (NH) | 179 | 202 | 300 | 0.81% | 0.80% | 1.02% |
| Native Hawaiian or Pacific Islander alone (NH) | 8 | 7 | 26 | 0.04% | 0.03% | 0.09% |
| Other race alone (NH) | 18 | 32 | 96 | 0.08% | 0.13% | 0.33% |
| Mixed race or Multiracial (NH) | 168 | 169 | 666 | 0.76% | 0.67% | 2.26% |
| Hispanic or Latino (any race) | 11,669 | 13,938 | 15,816 | 53.01% | 55.36% | 53.74% |
| Total | 22,011 | 25,175 | 29,433 | 100.00% | 100.00% | 100.00% |

=== 2020 census ===
As of the 2020 census, 29,433 people, 10,542 households, and 7,026 families were residing in the city.

The population density was 768.9 inhabitants per square mile (296.9/km^{2}).

The racial makeup of the city was 53.5% White, 6.5% African American, 0.8% Native American, 1.1% Asian, 0.1% Pacific Islander, 17.2% from some other races and 20.8% from two or more races. Hispanics or Latinos of any race were 53.74% of the population.

The median age was 36.5 years. 23.9% of residents were under the age of 18 and 17.8% of residents were 65 years of age or older. For every 100 females there were 94.2 males, and for every 100 females age 18 and over there were 92.0 males age 18 and over.

There were 10,542 households in Seguin, of which 32.9% had children under the age of 18 living in them. Of all households, 42.4% were married-couple households, 19.1% were households with a male householder and no spouse or partner present, and 30.1% were households with a female householder and no spouse or partner present. About 27.1% of all households were made up of individuals and 12.5% had someone living alone who was 65 years of age or older.

There were 11,563 housing units, of which 8.8% were vacant. The homeowner vacancy rate was 1.9% and the rental vacancy rate was 6.4%.

84.3% of residents lived in urban areas, while 15.7% lived in rural areas.

== Government ==
The U.S. Air Force's 12th Flying Training Wing operates an airfield for practice approaches and touch-and-go landings, known as Randolph AFB Auxiliary Field/Seguin Field. It was originally constructed with three runways about 12 miles east-northeast of Randolph AFB, in 1941. Today, it has a single active 8350 ft runway. Normally unattended, it is supported by a manned runway supervisor unit and aircraft rescue and firefighting vehicles when conducting flight operations.

The main offices of the Guadalupe-Blanco River Authority are located on East Court St. in Seguin. It manages Canyon Dam, upstream on the Guadalupe, and four small dams in the county and other facilities.

The Schertz-Seguin Local Government Corporation, half owned by each city, was created in 1998 to develop and operate a wholesale water supply system. Using wells in the Carrizo Aquifer in Gonzales County, production began in September 2002. It now also supplies Selma, Universal City, and Converse, as well as Springs Hill Water Supply Corp. and the San Antonio Water System. Its offices are in Starcke Park, near the Seguin waterworks.

The Texas Department of Criminal Justice operates a parole office in Seguin.

The United States Postal Service operates the Seguin Post Office at 531 West Court St. and the Seguin Annex at 1500 East Court, in the mall next to Bealls.

=== State and federal districts ===
Seguin was represented in the Texas House of Representatives from 1983 to 2010 by Republican Edmund Kuempel. He was noted for helping to get the State of Texas to restore the 19th-century mansion called Sebastopol and operate it as an historic site for 25 years. A native of Austin, businessman Kuempel died in office two days after being unopposed for reelection. John Kuempel, Edmund Kuempel's son, won the special election on December 14 of that year to succeed his father in the District 44 seat in the Texas House. He was reelected in 2012 and 2014.

Democrat Vicente Gonzalez has represented Guadalupe County in the U.S. House of Representatives as part of Texas' 15th Congressional District, since 2017. One of the "fajita" districts, the 15th runs in a narrow strip from Seguin down to McAllen in the Lower Rio Grande Valley.

=== Education ===
The city is served by the Seguin Independent School District, with about 8,000 students in 14 schools. Under the 2013 accountability ratings released by the Texas Education Agency, Seguin ISD and each of its campuses received "Met Standard" ratings based upon the new performance standards. The performance index-based rating system applies one of two labels to districts and public schools across the state: Met Standard or Improvement Required. The public schools include:

- Joe F. Saegert Sixth Grade Center (received the Distinction Designation for Academic Achievement in Reading, as did Koennecke Elementary School)
- A.J. Briesmeister Middle School
- Jim Barnes Middle School
- Seguin High School
- Lizzie M. Burges Alternate School
- Mercer-Blumberg Learning Center

On May 4, 2019, Seguin ISD voters approved a $64.7 million bond package with 1,569 (66.23%) votes for and 799 (33.73%) against. Bond 2019 was passed by voters and passed renovations for AJ Briesemeister Middle School, Matador Stadium rebuild, Jefferson Elementary, play areas and shade canopies for all Seguin ISD elementary schools, Land purchase to replace McQueeney Elementary, and various campus improvements.

Navarro Independent School District Serves students in northern Seguin and rural areas beyond.

=== Private schools ===
- St. James Catholic School A Historical Marker notes original concrete portion from 1854 makes this the oldest continuously occupied school building in Texas.
- First Baptist Christian Academy
- Emanuel's Lutheran Day School, for students 18 months through four years
- Seguin Lifegate Christian School

=== Higher education ===
Texas Lutheran University, with about 1,400 students, is located in Seguin and affiliated with the Evangelical Lutheran Church in America. It has a diverse student body, with 27% Hispanic, 10% African-American, and only 20% describing themselves as Lutheran. Texas Lutheran recently joined the Southern Collegiate Athletic Conference, NCAA Division III, so its teams play Austin College, Colorado College, Centenary College in Shreveport, Schreiner University, Southwestern University, Trinity University, and the University of Dallas.

Central Texas Technology Center, one of the Alamo Colleges, is located north of Seguin. It offers specialized education and workforce skill development to meet the needs of existing and prospective employers. Seguin's Economic Development Corp. also funds its Manufacturing Technology Academy, which offers dual credit courses and internships for high-school juniors and seniors.

=== Libraries ===
The city operates the Seguin Public Library free of charge for residents of Seguin and Guadalupe County at 313 W Nolte St. The Blumberg Library at TLU is also open to for use by adults who pay an annual membership.

== Health and hospitals ==
The Guadalupe Regional Medical Center (GMRC) doubled in size following a $100 million expansion, with 750 employees supporting 65 physician specialists. GRMC's services include an Emergency Department, a Wellness Center, and an orthopedic surgery department.

== Transportation ==
- Austin-Bergstrom International Airport is about an hour away via I-35 or the Hwy 130 toll road.
- San Antonio International Airport is 45 minutes to an hour away via I-10 and I-410 or Hwy 281.
- Huber Airpark, 2475 Rudeloff Rd, is a privately owned field for general aviation.

Greyhound offers daily service to Houston and San Antonio. Tri City Taxi Service is based in Seguin.

=== Highways and scenic routes ===
- Interstate 10, Jacksonville-Houston-Seguin-San Antonio-Fort Stockton-El Paso-L.A.
- US Highway 90, Columbus-Luling-Seguin-San Antonio-Del Rio-Alpine-El Paso-L.A.
- Alt. US 90, Houston-Sugar Land-Rosenburg-Eagle Lake-Halletsville-Shiner-Gonzales-Seguin.
- State Highway 46, Seguin-New Braunfels-Boerne.
- State Highway 123, San Marcos-Seguin-Stockdale-Karnes City.
- State Highway 130 (Toll Road), off I-35 Georgetown-Austin-Lockhart to I-10 at Seguin.
- FM 78, Kirby-I 35-Randolph AFB-Schertz-Cibilo-Marion-McQueeney-Seguin.
- FM 20, Seguin-Fentress-Lockhart.
- FM 466, Seguin-Monthalia-Cost-Gonzales.

== Culture ==
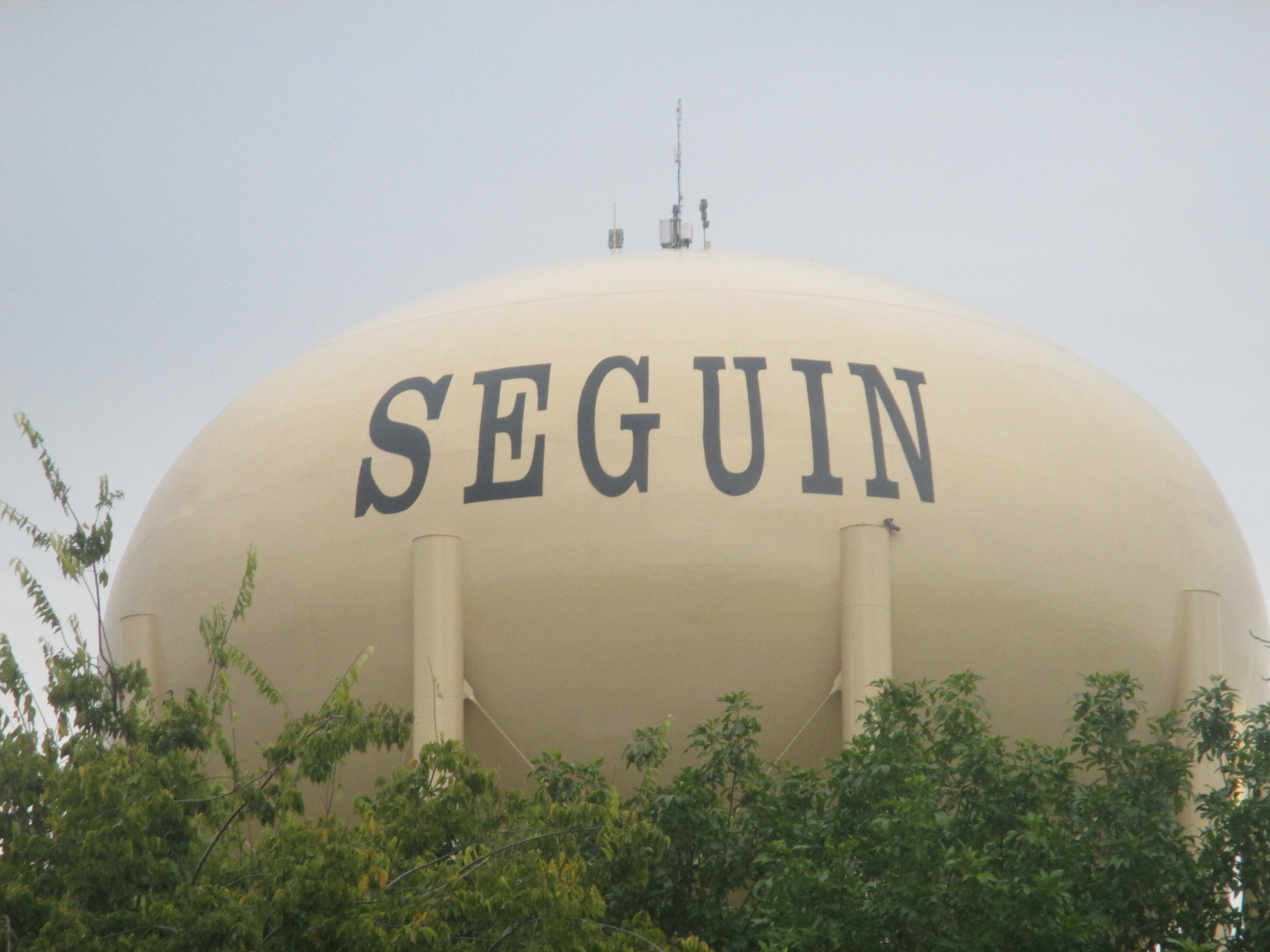
Water tower in Seguin

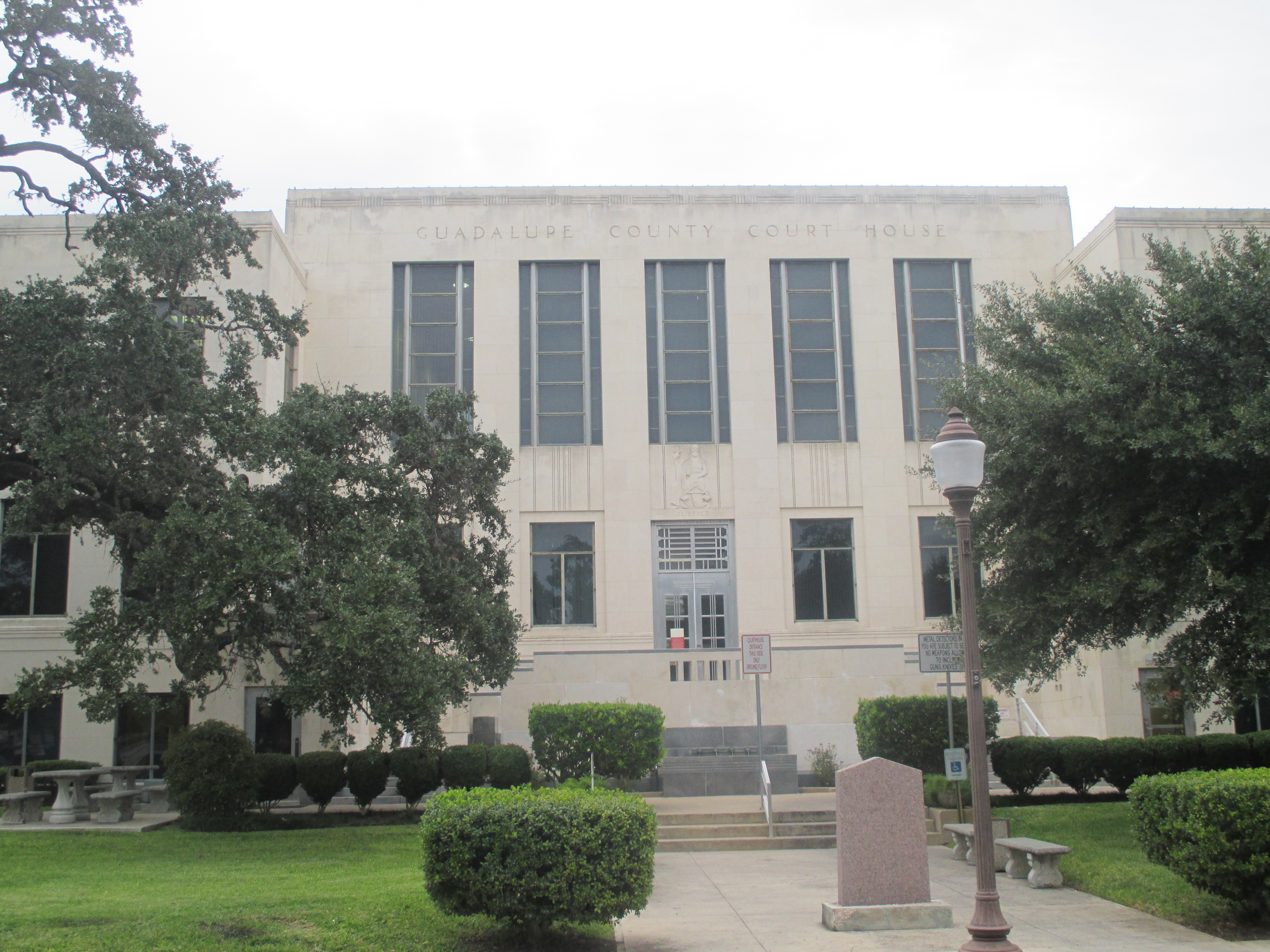
Guadalupe County Courthouse, 1936, in Art Deco style by Lewis Wirtz and Harold Calhoun

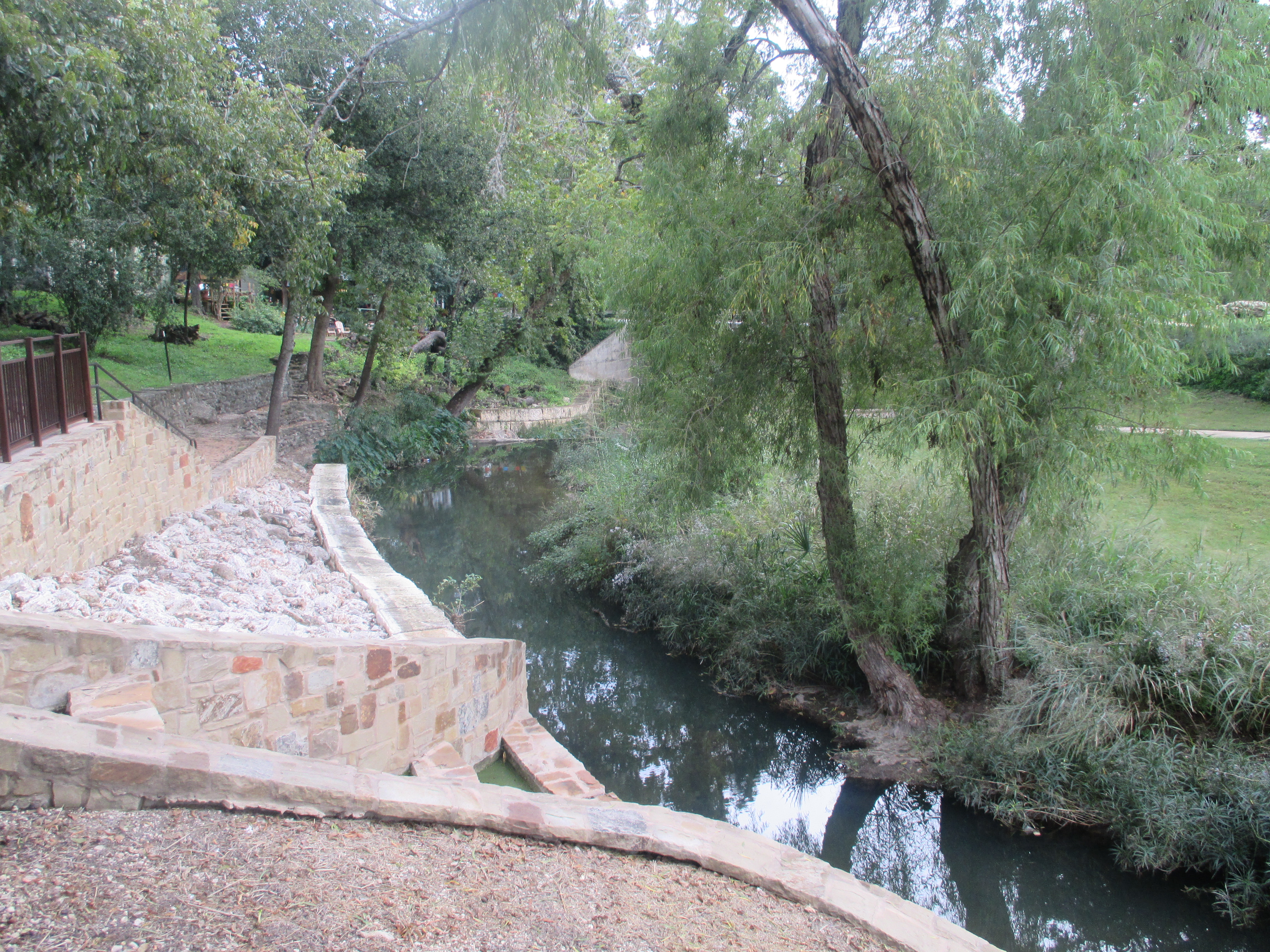
Walnut Springs Park on Walnut Branch, a small tributary of the Guadalupe River, was first constructed by members of the Civilian Conservation Corps.

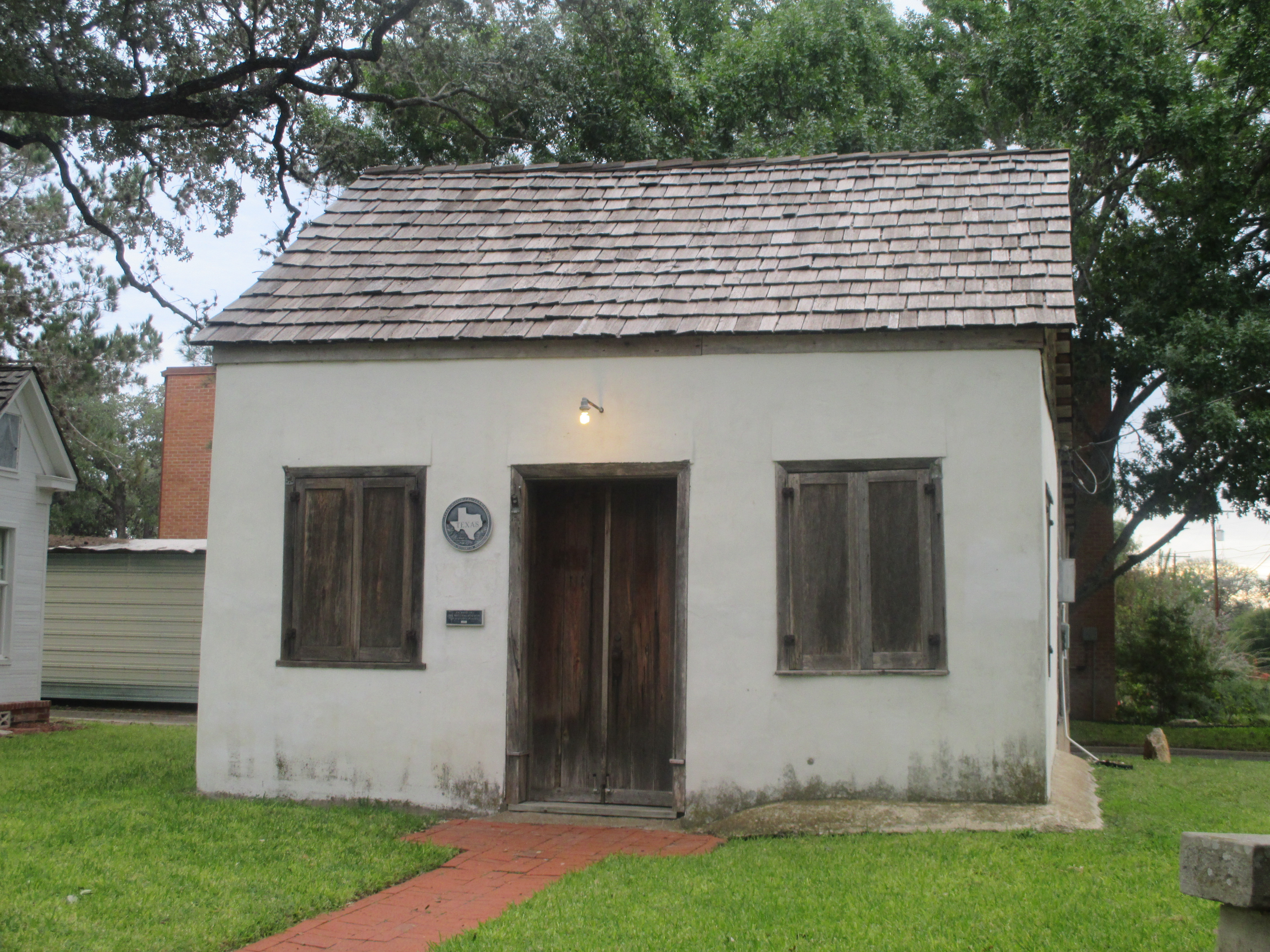
Los Nogales Museum, only adobe building in Seguin (built 1849), restored by Seguin Conservation Society, 1953

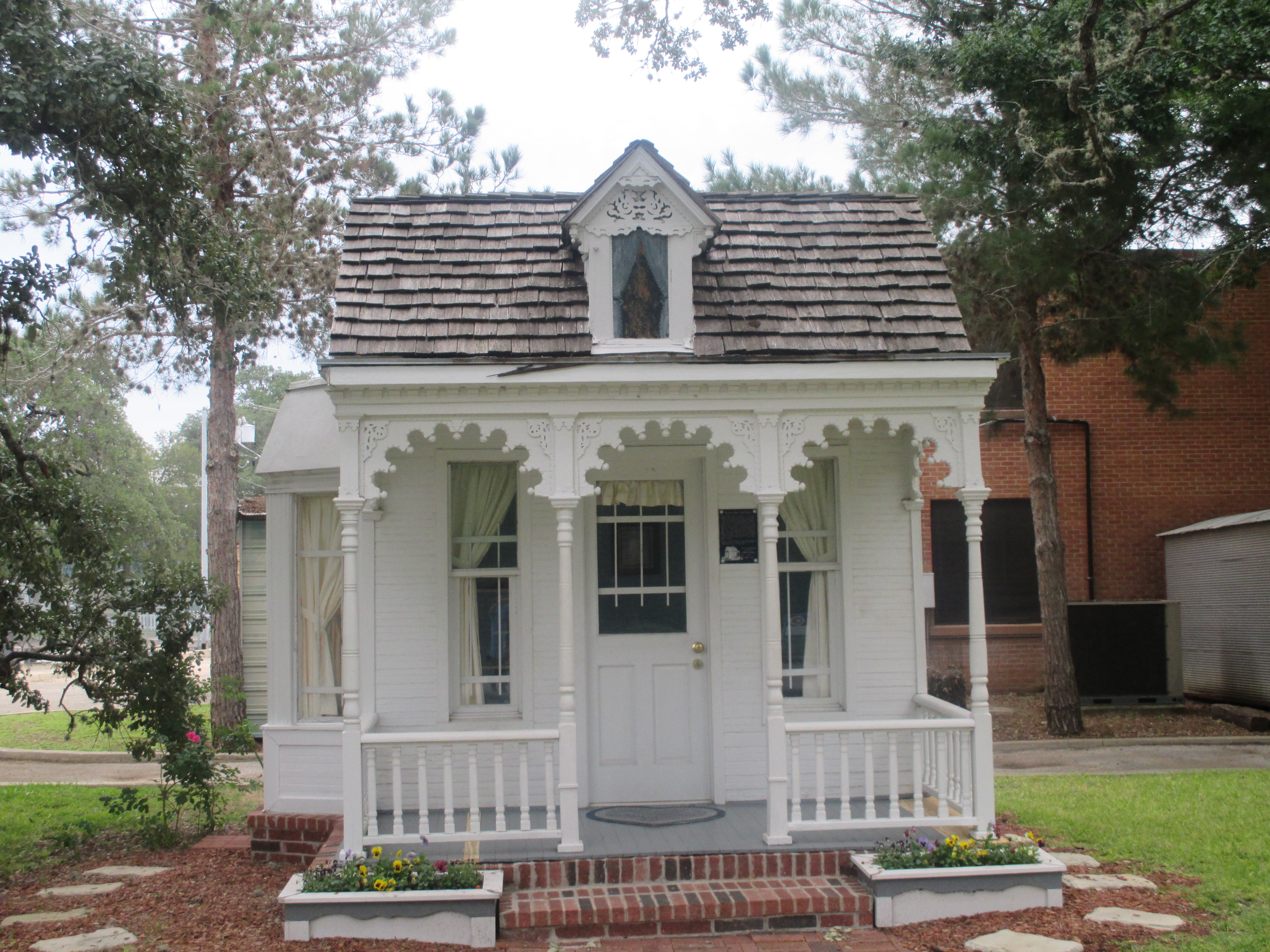
The charming Dietz-Castilla Doll House, built 1910, now located next to Los Nogales Museum

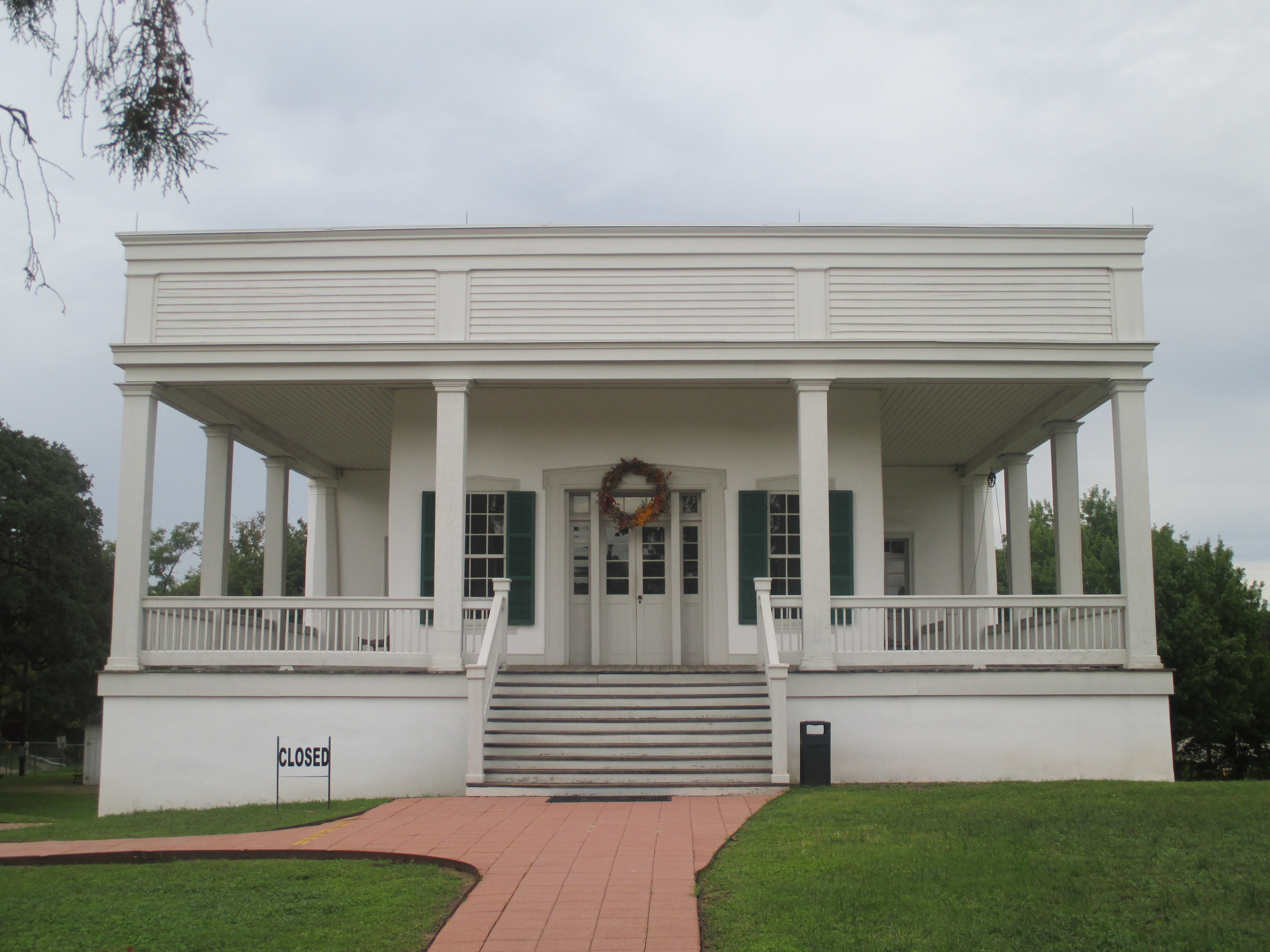
Sebastopol House State Historic Site, one of the oldest and finest surviving concrete buildings west of the Mississippi River

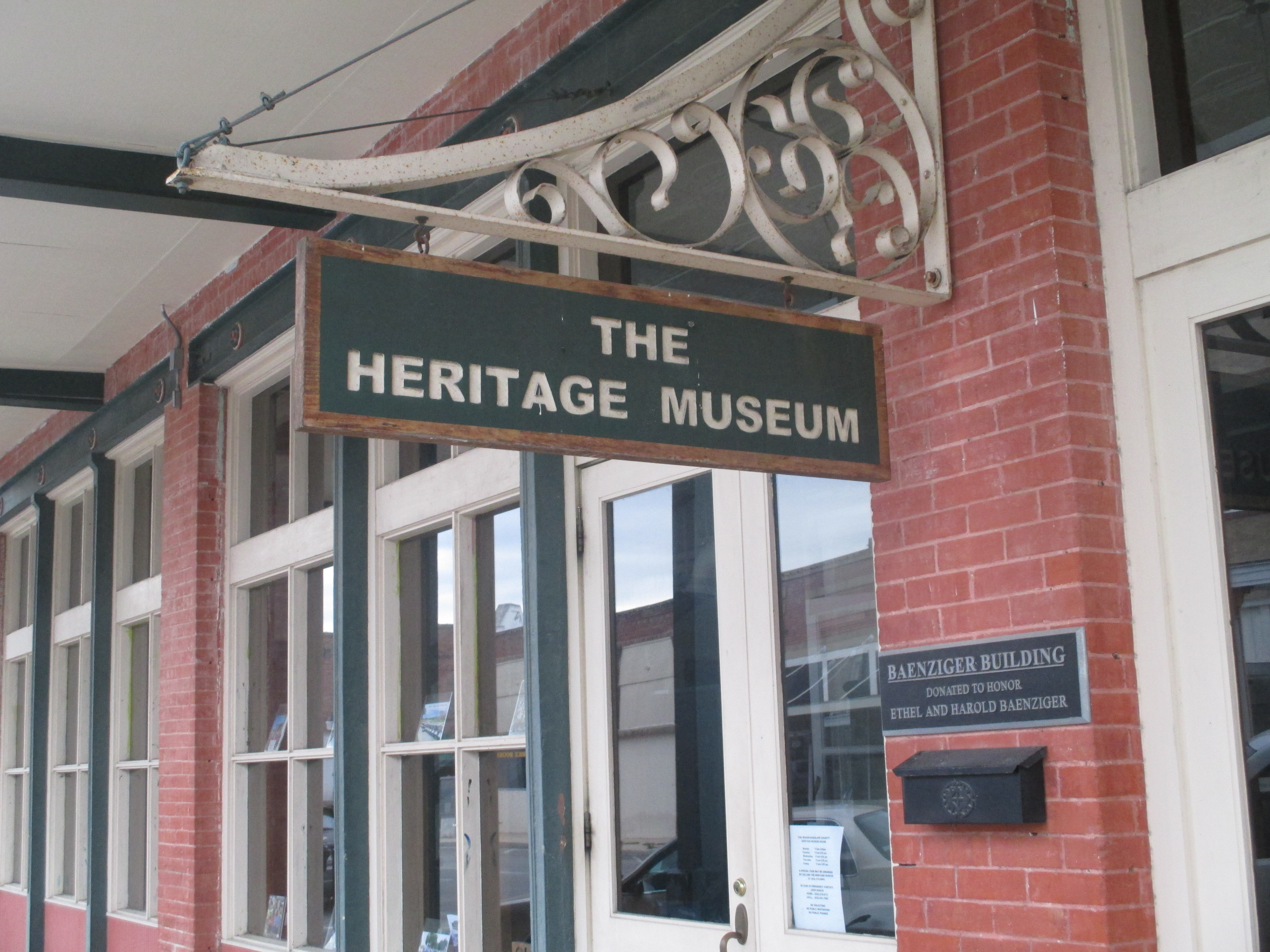
Heritage Museum exhibits paleo-Indian artifacts, African-American history, the German heritage, and more.

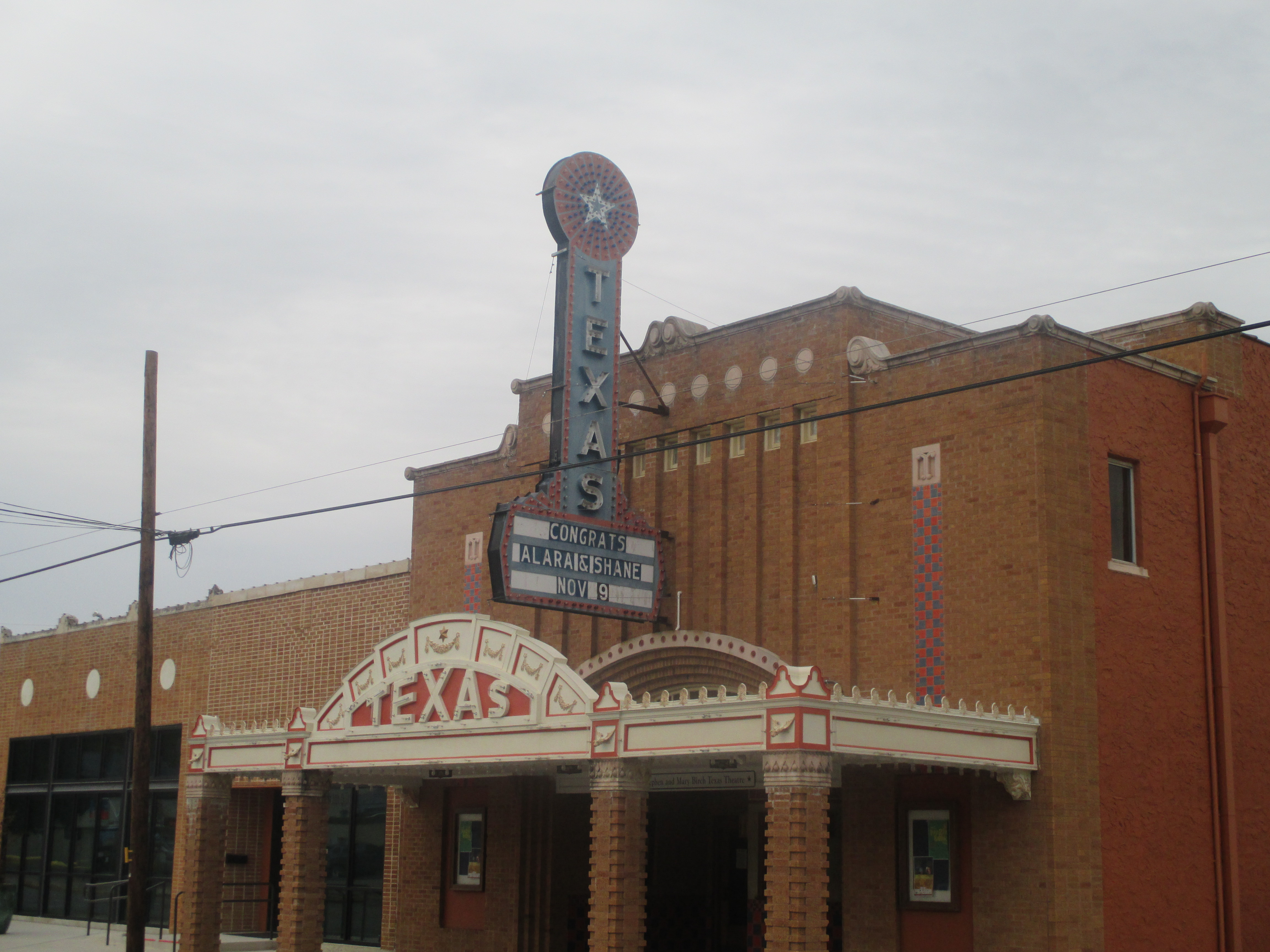
The Texas Theatre, designed by "local boy" Marvin Eickenroht, opened in 1931, restored and reopened 2011.

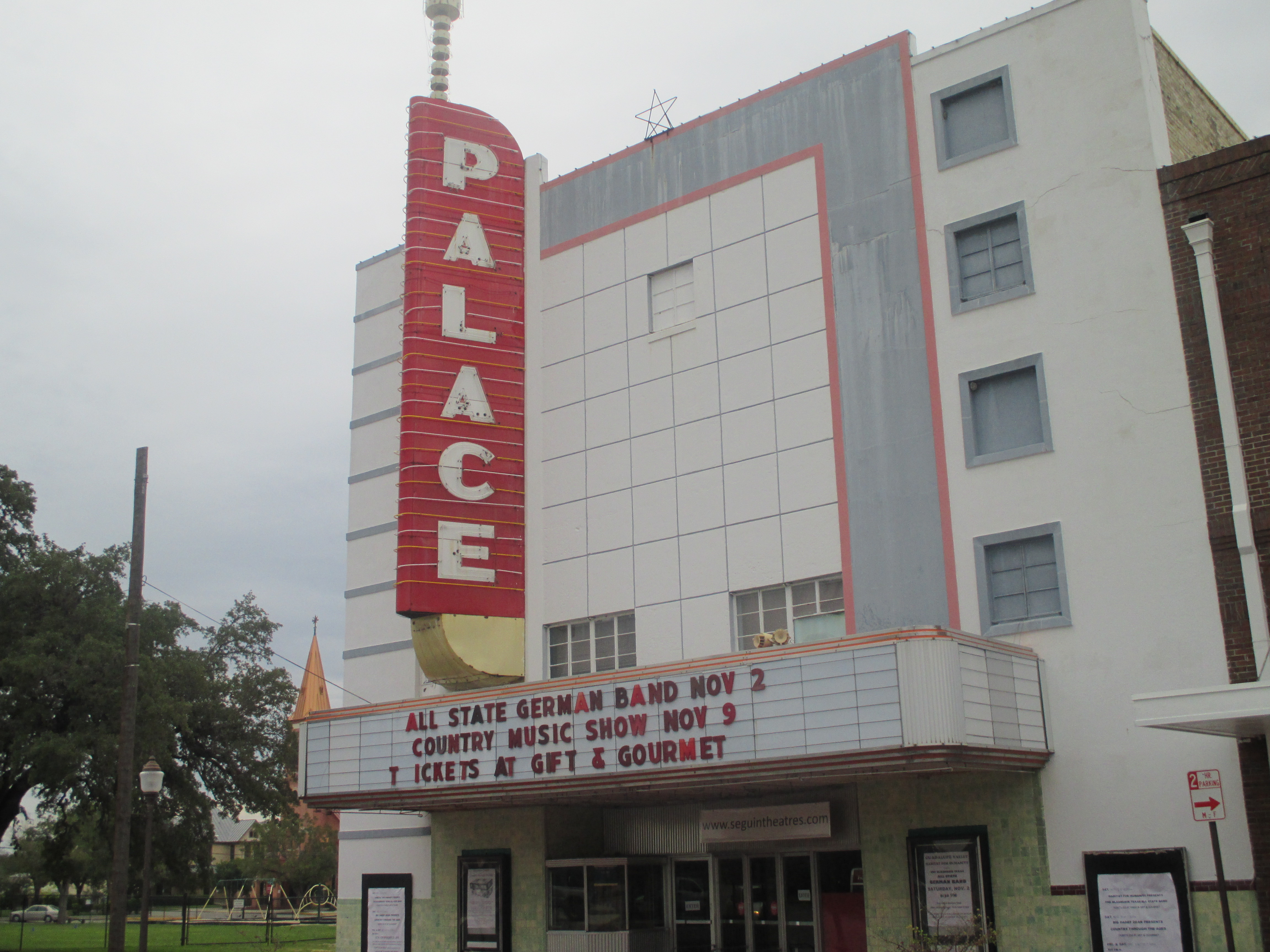
The Palace Theatre in the downtown Historic District hosts periodic community events.

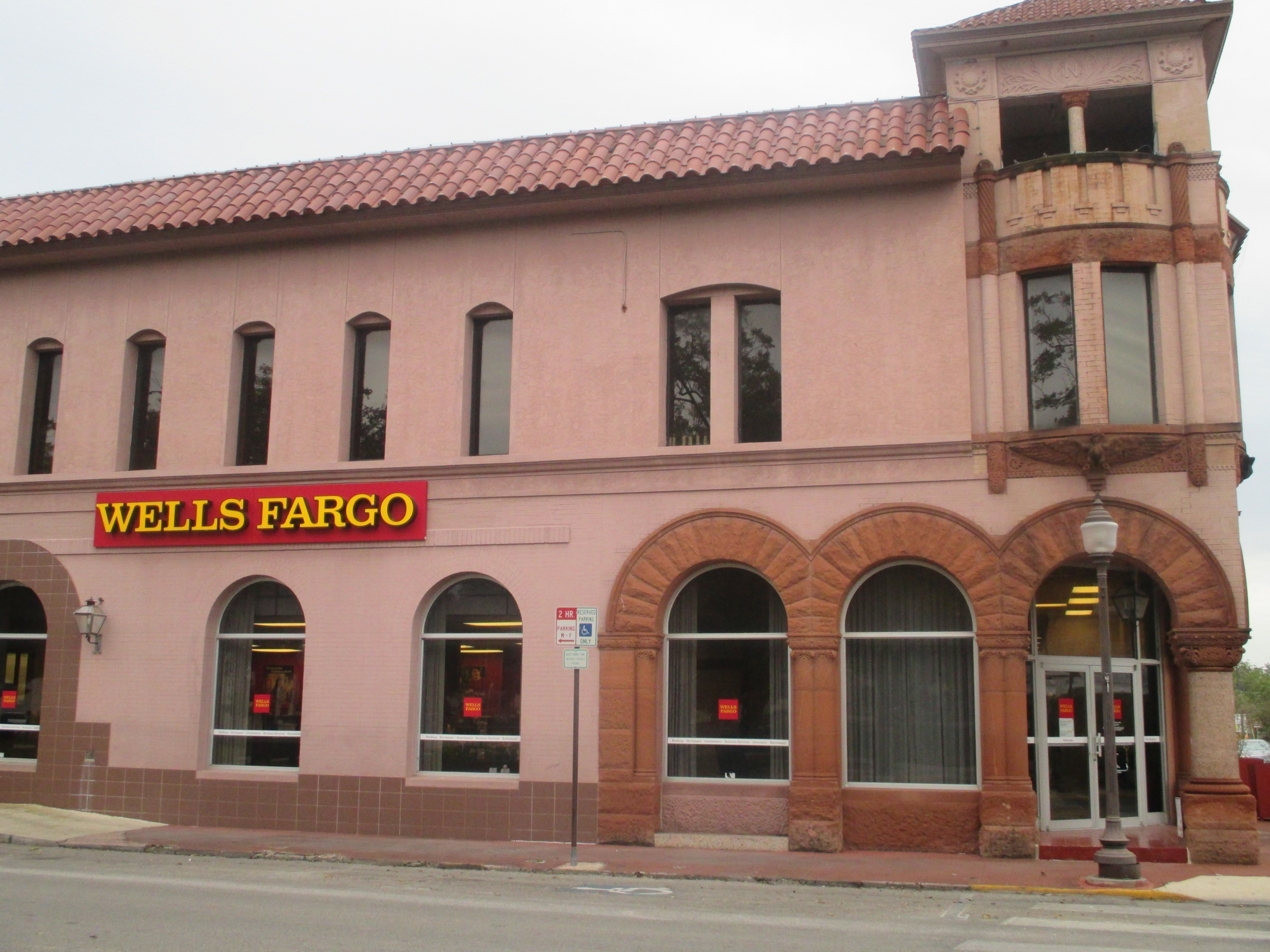
Originally built for E. Nolte & Sons Bank, by James Riely Gordon, the master architect of Texas Courthouses.

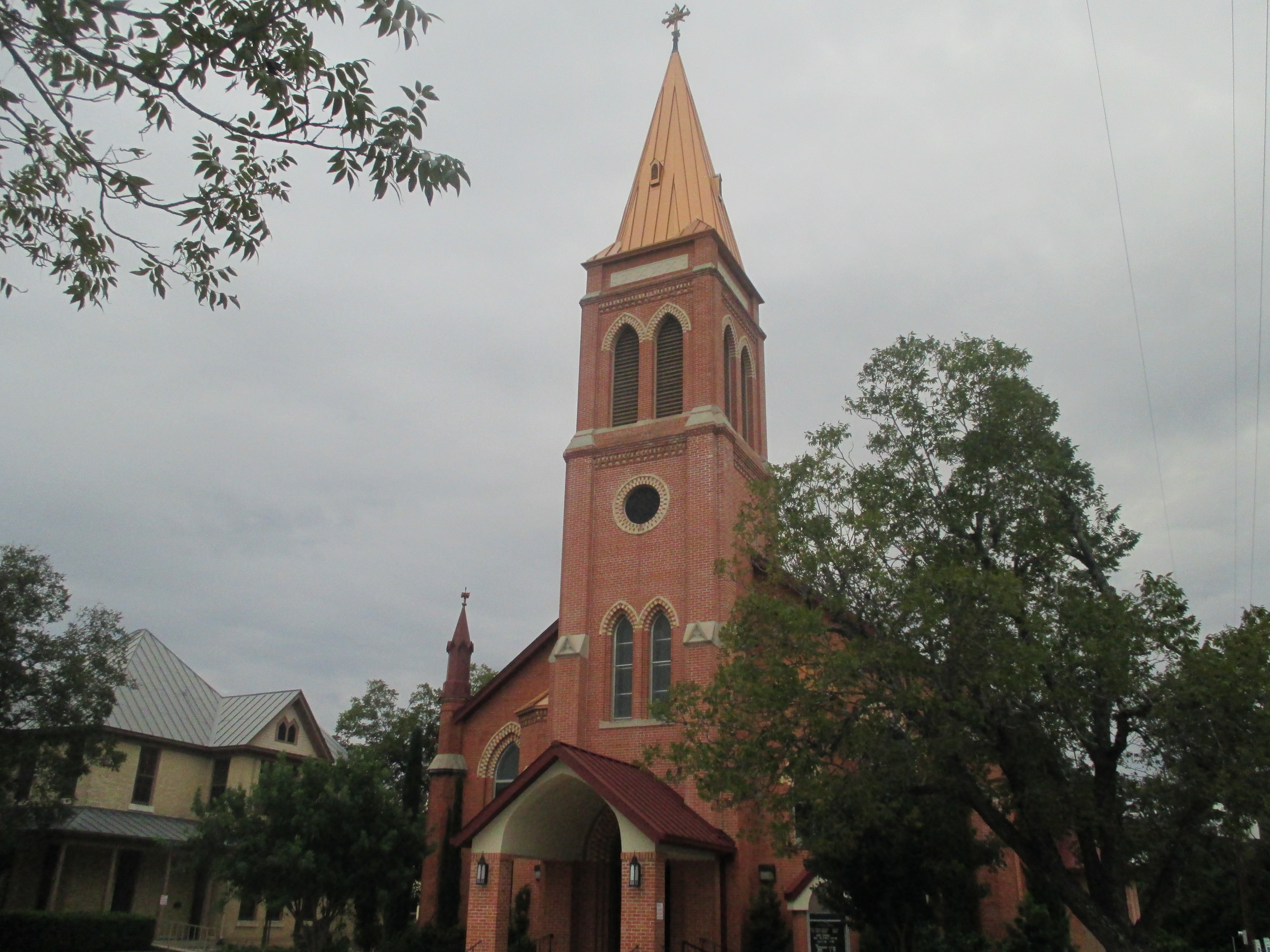
With a cornerstone date of 1914, St. James Catholic is one of almost a hundred church buildings by Leo M.J. Diehlman.

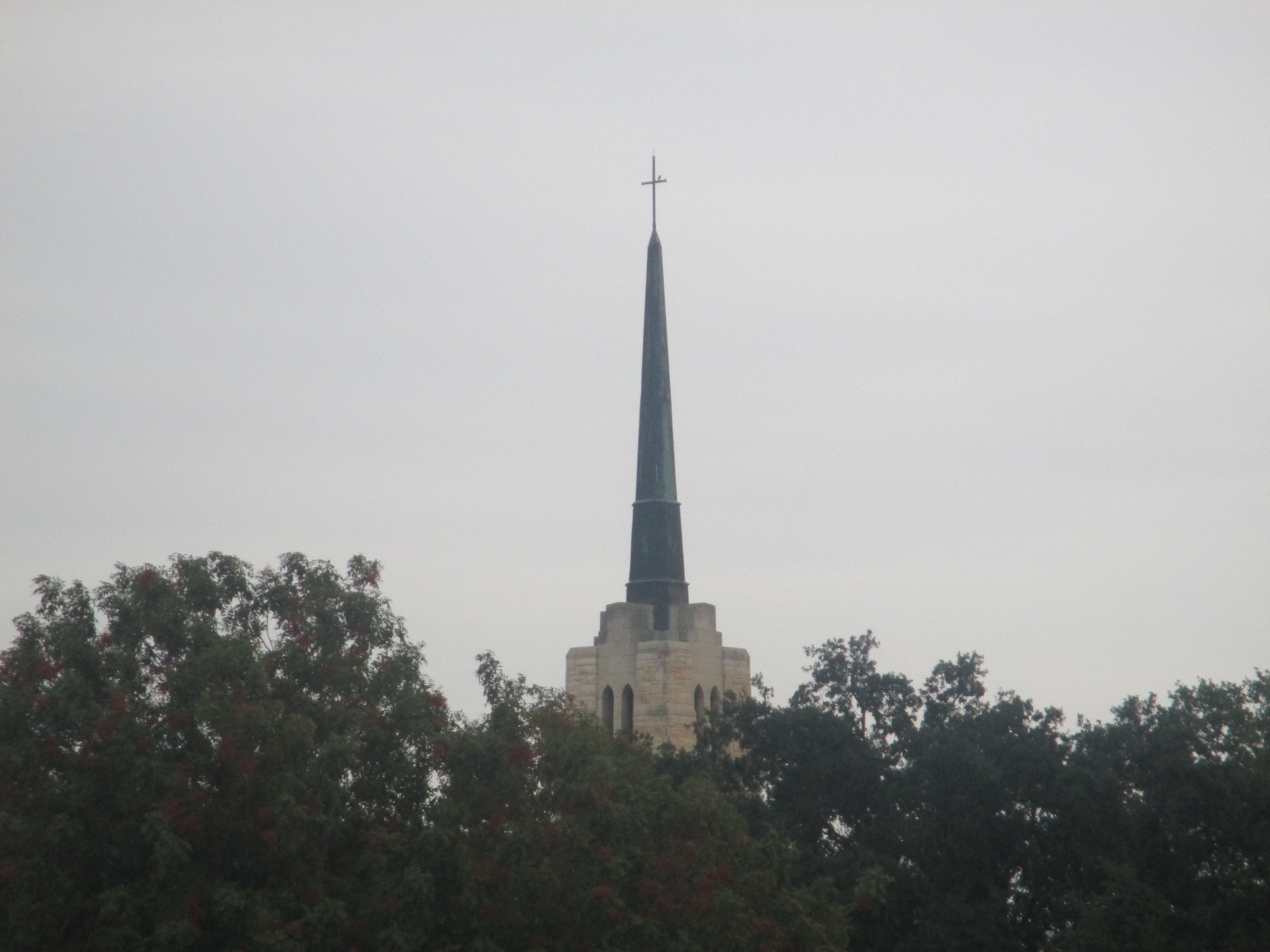
Steeple of the Chapel of the Abiding Presence at Texas Lutheran University, Henry Steinbomer architect. Ed Sovik designed the interior.

=== Newspapers and radio ===
Seguin is one of the very few cities in the country with competing daily papers. The Gazette, a broadsheet, has been publishing for more than 125 years, since 1888. It is now part of the Southern Newspapers chain. The Daily News is part of the news operation of the locally owned and independently programmed radio station KWED.

- Seguin Gazette
- Seguin Daily News
- KWED 1580 AM

=== Attractions ===
- The Texas Agricultural Education and Heritage Center, the "Big Red Barn", helps kids and others learn the mechanics and history of farming in Central Texas, with sample crops and gardens, barnyard animals and poultry, and displays of vintage equipment and tools. A collected village has houses, barns, a one-room schoolhouse, a pharmacy, a blacksmith shop, a gas station, a church, and other relics from the rural past. Many events are held on weekends, and tours are given by appointment.
- Sebastopol House Historic Site is perhaps the finest surviving 19th-century concrete building west of the Mississippi. Here on the frontier, settlers began experimenting with concrete construction years before the Civil War, and built 100 or so structures of "lime-crete", as it was called. A team of slaves built this mansion, mixing local gravel, sand, lime, and some organic materials, then pouring the mix into wooden forms. When the concrete was solid, they raised the forms and repeated the process. A journalist declared Seguin "the Mother of Concrete Cities". Sebastopol House, a well-preserved architectural masterpiece, built in 1856 in Greek Revival style, is now a museum offering free tours.
- The Fiedler Museum displays geological examples, with various types of rocks from across the state in a small garden at Langner Hall on the TLU campus.
- The "World's Largest Pecan" is a 5-ft-long, two-and-a-half-ft-wide concrete nut erected in 1962; it sits in front of the county courthouse. This county is a large producer of pecans and often claims the nickname "Pecan Capital of Texas". Seguin has been described as "a big pecan orchard with a small town in it". A new pecan-shaped sculpture, 4 ft longer than the previous record holder, was unveiled on July 4, 2011, to ensure its place as the "World's Largest". It can be seen at the Texas Agricultural Education and Heritage Center. The original and still photogenic "big pecan" remains at its downtown location.
- True Women – Seguin is one of the settings of the 1994 Janice Woods Windle historical novel True Women. The author grew up here, learning the women's side of history from family members. A self-drive tour of sites in the book is available at the Chamber of Commerce or at. The best-selling novel was the basis for the 1997 CBS miniseries adaptation, True Women, starring Dana Delany, Annabeth Gish, and Angelina Jolie.
- Park West – The 47-acre community park includes athletic fields, a skatepark, a playscape, a basketball court, a splash pad, a group pavilion, picnic shelters, and nature trails.
- Max Starcke Park – Windshield Tourism: a scenic River Drive passes a waterfall on the Guadalupe, beneath towering cypress and pecans; golf, 18-hole regulation course; picnic areas and pavilions; Little League baseball-softball complex; volleyball, basketball, tennis courts; two paddling trails for canoes and kayaks; and Kids' Kingdom Playscape.
- Seguin Events Complex/Fairgrounds Park – home of the Guadalupe County Fair & PRCA Rodeo (held the second weekend of October), a rodeo arena, baseball fields, 14 volleyball courts, and meeting spaces; it is used as the site of Buck Fever, Freedom Fiesta, and other annual events
- Walnut Springs Park – trails, hiking, former stagecoach route, historic markers, sculptures
- Central Park – Statue of Tejano hero Juan N. Seguin by the sculptor Erik Christianson of Bulverde; fountain, trade days, band concerts, car shows, and other events
- Historic Main Street District – walking/driving tours, fine early 20th-century buildings by some of the state's leading architects: J. Riely Gordon, Leo M.J. Dielmann, Atlee Ayers, Marvin Eickenroht, Lewis Wirtz and Harold Calhoun, Henry Steinbomer
- Seguin Outdoor Learning Center
- Max Starcke Park Golf Course – 18-hole course along the river, the original 9 holes designed by John Bredemus, a prolific course designer called "the father of Texas golf", the 9 holes added later and designed by Shelley Mayfield make their way through a former pecan orchard
- Golf Club of Seguin / Chaparral Golf Course
- Lake Seguin/Seguin Paddling Trail – canoeing and kayaking at Max Starcke Park
- Meadow Lake – fishing, boating
- Lake Placid – fishing, boating, jet skiing

=== Performing arts ===
The Mid-Texas Symphony is the area's only professional orchestra. Performances occur in venues in both Comal and Guadalupe counties. In addition to a subscription series of six classical and pops concerts, MTS produces four free children's concerts each season: two in Seguin and two in New Braunfels. More than 3600 fourth- and fifth-grade students attend a free symphonic concert each season. As of 2021, the music director is Akiko Fujimoto.

Teatro De Artes De Juan Seguin Teatro De Artes De Juan Seguin (Teatro) is celebrating its 40th anniversary in 2022–2023. Teatro is a non-profit organization that promotes a better understanding of the Mexican American culture by the study, teaching, practice, and performance of the arts and has called Seguin, Texas home all 40 years. It is through their deliberate teachings that youth and adults are able to reclaim, maintain, and celebrate their Mexican American roots, customs, knowledge, and celebrations through community education. Teatro is home to the famous Ballet Folklórico De La Rosa, Mariachi Juan Seguin, Conjunto Juan Seguin, Dia de los Muertos events, Noche De Gala Vocalista Competition, Summer Agriculture, Culinary, and Visual Arts Camp and many other family friendly events including humanities events. The Teatro De Artes De Juan Seguin Cultural Arts Center is located on the westside of Seguin and has called the former Our Lady of Guadalupe Church/Church Hall home since 1996.

=== Public art ===
- "The World's Largest Pecan", on the courthouse lawn, a popular folk art piece, plaster over concrete, created by a local dentist and master plasterer Monroe J. Engbrock, 1978
- Eagle, atop the Guadalupe County Veterans Memorial on the courthouse lawn, by Erik Christianson, 2006
- "Stagecoach Road", a 90-foot wide mural by Brent McCarthy, on the route where stagecoaches passed from the Magnolia Hotel, 2008
- Statue of Juan N. Seguín, a hero-on-horseback in Central Park, by Erik Christianson, 2000
- Art Deco fountain in Central Park, designed by an unknown architect, 1930s
- Bas-reliefs of Justice and Wisdom, on the courthouse high above the entryways, sculpted by Harold Calhoun, 1936
- Bas-relief of the town seal high above the Municipal Building (City Hall) entrance, carved by Harold Calhoun, 1935
- Bird sculptures in Walnut Springs Park, eight wood and metal works by Marika Bordes and a team of her students, Barry Duncan, Howard Crunk, and Jimmy Schmidt, 2012
- Statue of Martin Luther, in front of Beck College Center, near entrance to Texas Lutheran campus off Court at Prexy Dr., by Elmer P. Peterson, 1976
- Three Graces Sculpture, on TLU campus, south of the Schuech Fine Arts Center
- Sculpture Garden, on TLU campus north of the Schuech Fine Arts Center, works by various artists, faculty and students

=== National Register sites ===
Guadalupe County has about a dozen sites listed on the National Register of Historic Places, most of them in Seguin:

- Sebastopol House (added 1970)
- Erskine-Holloman House (1970)
- Los Nogales (1972)
- Wilson Utility Pottery Kilns Archeological Dist. (1975), on Capote Road
- Joseph E. Johnson House (1978)
- Robert Hall House (1979)
- Saffold Dam (1979)
- Park Hotel, or Plaza Hotel (1980)
- Commercial Historic District (1983), with a boundary increase (2003)
- Edward and Texana Tewes House, on Linne Road (1997)
- Sweet Home Vocational and Agricultural High School (1998)

In addition, the county boasts 80 Texas State Historical Markers, with about 25 of those within Seguin's city limits.

=== Sister cities ===
Seguin has three sister cities, as designated by Sister Cities International, Inc (SCI):

- Millicent, South Australia, Australia
- Vechta, Lower Saxony, Germany
- San Nicolás de los Garza, Nuevo León, Mexico

== Notable people ==
- Jacob De Cordova, land agent, Member, Texas House of Representatives, 1808–1868
- Manuel N. Flores, rancher, served with Juan Seguin (his brother-in-law), in the Texas Revolution, 1801–1868
- Sam Flores, educator, political activist, 1925–2007
- Drew French, current bullpen coach for the Atlanta Braves, 1984-
- Maud A. B. Fuller, Baptist leader and educator 1868–1972
- Nanci Griffith, Grammy Award-winning singer, guitarist and songwriter, 1953–2021
- P.J. Hall, NFL defensive tackle for the Oakland Raiders, 1995–
- Chuck Hartenstein, Texas Longhorns baseball pitching star, MLB relief pitcher, and MLB coach, 1942–2021
- John Coffee "Jack" Hays, Texas Ranger, 1817–1883
- John Ireland, Governor of Texas, 1827–1896
- Ron Jones, MLB player for the Philadelphia Phillies, 1964–2006
- J. R. E. Lee, born a slave, 20 years president historically black Florida A&M, 1864–1944
- Joel Nestali Martinez, elected 1992, bishop of the United Methodist Church, 1940 –
- Shelley Mayfield, pro golfer and course designer, 1924–2010
- Ben McCulloch, Confederate general, killed in action, 1819–1862
- Henry McCulloch, Confederate general, 1816–1895
- Forrest Mims, amateur scientist and popular author on electronics, 1944–
- José Antonio Navarro, rancher, signer of the Texas Declaration of Independence, 1795–1871
- John Park, inventor, builder using concrete, 1814–1872
- Freddie Patek, MLB shortstop for the Kansas City Royals, three times American League All Star, 1944–
- Zachary Selig, artist, author, spiritist, 1949–2016
- Max Starcke, Seguin mayor and longtime head of LCRA, 1884–1972
- Cleveland Vann, NFL Linebacker 5th round draft pick 1974 Miami Dolphins. CFL Grey Cup MVP 1976 for Saskatchewan Roughriders, 1951-
- Ferdinand C. Weinert, State Representative, State Senator, Secretary of State, 1853–1939
- Rudolph Weinert, 1936–1963 State Senator, 1894–1963
- John P. White, elected 1876, Presiding Judge 1879–1892, Texas Court of Appeals, 1832–1905
- "Smokey" Joe Williams, Negro league pitcher, Baseball Hall of Fame, 1886–1951
- Janice Woods Windle, author of historical novels, 1938–
- Harry Wurzbach, Member, U.S. House of Representatives, 1874–1931

== See also ==
- List of municipalities in Texas
- List of museums in Central Texas
