= Magnolia Hotel (Seguin, Texas) =

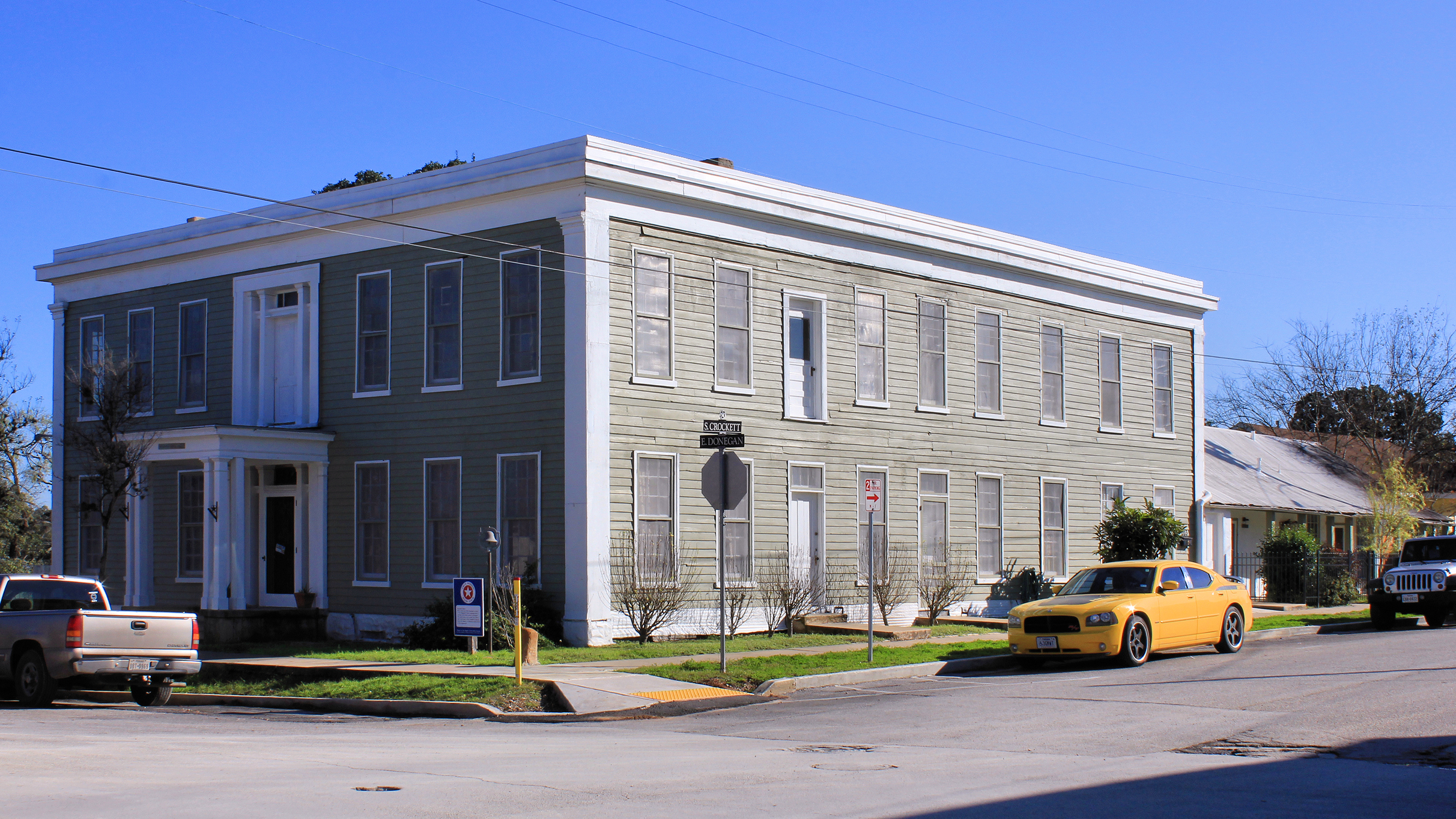
- Interactive map of the Magnolia Hotel area

General information
- Status: Restoration
- Type: Hotel
- Location: Seguin, Texas, U.S.
- Coordinates: 29.5680°N 97.9627°W
- Opening: 1847

Technical details
- Floor count: 2
- Lifts/elevators: 0

The Magnolia Hotel is a historic structure located in Seguin, Texas. It was originally built 1840 by James Campbell, as a two room log cabin. It was in operation as a hotel as early as 1844. The building had been in poor repair for a number of years and was added to a list of the most endangered historic places in Texas in 2012. In 2013, the structure came under new ownership of Erin Ghedi and Jim and was being restored for use as a private residence.

As of 2019, The Magnolia Hotel is a fully functioning hotel that can be rented out nightly. Tours are also given. It is touted as one of the most haunted hotels in Texas, and many ghost-hunting television shows have been hosted there.

== History ==
During the Republic of Texas, a two-room log cabin in Seguin, Texas, and was built by James Campbell in 1840. sheltered travelers on the frontier as early as 1844, and became known as the Magnolia Hotel. An adjoining concrete building was erected by early 1846, and a larger, two-story frame building replaced the log cabin by 1853.

The Magnolia Hotel was included in the Historic American Buildings Survey (H.A.B.S.) in 1934, and contributes to the Seguin Commercial Historic District listed on the National Register of Historic Places in 1983.

The Magnolia's limecrete section was built by John Park, a chemist and doctor who experimented with concrete after moving to Seguin in 1846. The hotel was the first 'Park's concrete' building in town, and is surely the oldest still standing. Park's work, with his imitators and rivals, led to Seguin having the largest concentration of mid-19th century concrete structures in the United States.

The dating of the concrete hotel is established because Captain Jack Hays, "perhaps the most famous Texas Ranger" according to Willie Mae Weinert's Authentic History of Guadalupe County, married Susan Calvert, daughter of Jeremiah Strother Calvert, the hotel's owner, "in the south room of the concrete portion of the hotel on April 29, 1847, Rev. John M. McCulloch presiding."

Park's concrete building was next to a two-room cabin built of logs originally gathered by Seguin citizens to build a stockade as defense against possible Indian raids. The logs were instead sold to Texas Ranger James Campbell, and his cabin became the point of defense. The two-story frame building that now sits atop the large basement, replacing the Campbell cabin, dates from the early 1850s. It shows graceful Greek Revival symmetry and detailing around the door, and a roof line similar to that of the concrete house known as Sebastopol built 1854–56.

Frederick Law Olmsted passed through Seguin in February 1854, and wrote about the town's many concrete buildings, noting, "The hotel is large and good." That he made no mention of the hotel itself being of concrete implies that he was referring to the much larger wooden building, dating it to about 1853.

Jeremiah Calvert sold the property to Dr. William Read, a dentist who operated the hotel from 1850 to 1860, then Colonel Thomas Dickey Johnson and Katherine Calvert Johnston owned it until 1900. Together they encompassed the years when the Magnolia served as an overnight stop for stagecoaches making their runs from the coastal ports to San Antonio and points west. A young slave rang a bell to announce the stage's arrival, to summon guests at mealtime, and in emergencies. The stone the youngster stood on remains in place. The bell actually came from the Alamo, having been found in the San Antonio River in 1845 then brought to the hotel by John Twohig, and was used at the Magnolia until about 1900. A Seguin woman purchased the bell and donated it to the Daughters of the Republic of Texas, then the managers of the Alamo shrine.

During the stagecoach years, from 1848 to about 1880, the Magnolia served as the stagecoach stop in Seguin. As such, the hotel served as a center of social life in the town, serving food, drink and hosting dances in the ballroom. Rival hotels, constructed of brick and boasting of "fire-proof" construction, opened in the last decade of the 19th century and the early years of the 20th century displaced the Magnolia as the premier lodging in town.

In the 1930s, the property was bought by Inez and Edgar Lannom, who lived downstairs and operated with small apartments upstairs and downstairs for another 75 years or so. The building fell into disrepair, leading Preservation Texas to list it among the state's "Most Endangered Historic Places" in March 2012. On March 1, 2013, Jim Ghedi and Erin O Wallace-Ghedi purchased the building and have privately funded the restoration bringing it back to its original state. It now has become a private museum and personal residence to the Ghedis. Though much of the building remains a work in progress, the bottom floor has been fully renovated.

The building was visited by the Ghost Adventures and Ghost Brothers TV shows as well as the YouTube channel Watcher.
