= The Wilson Potteries =

Pottery company in Texas

Wilson Potteries
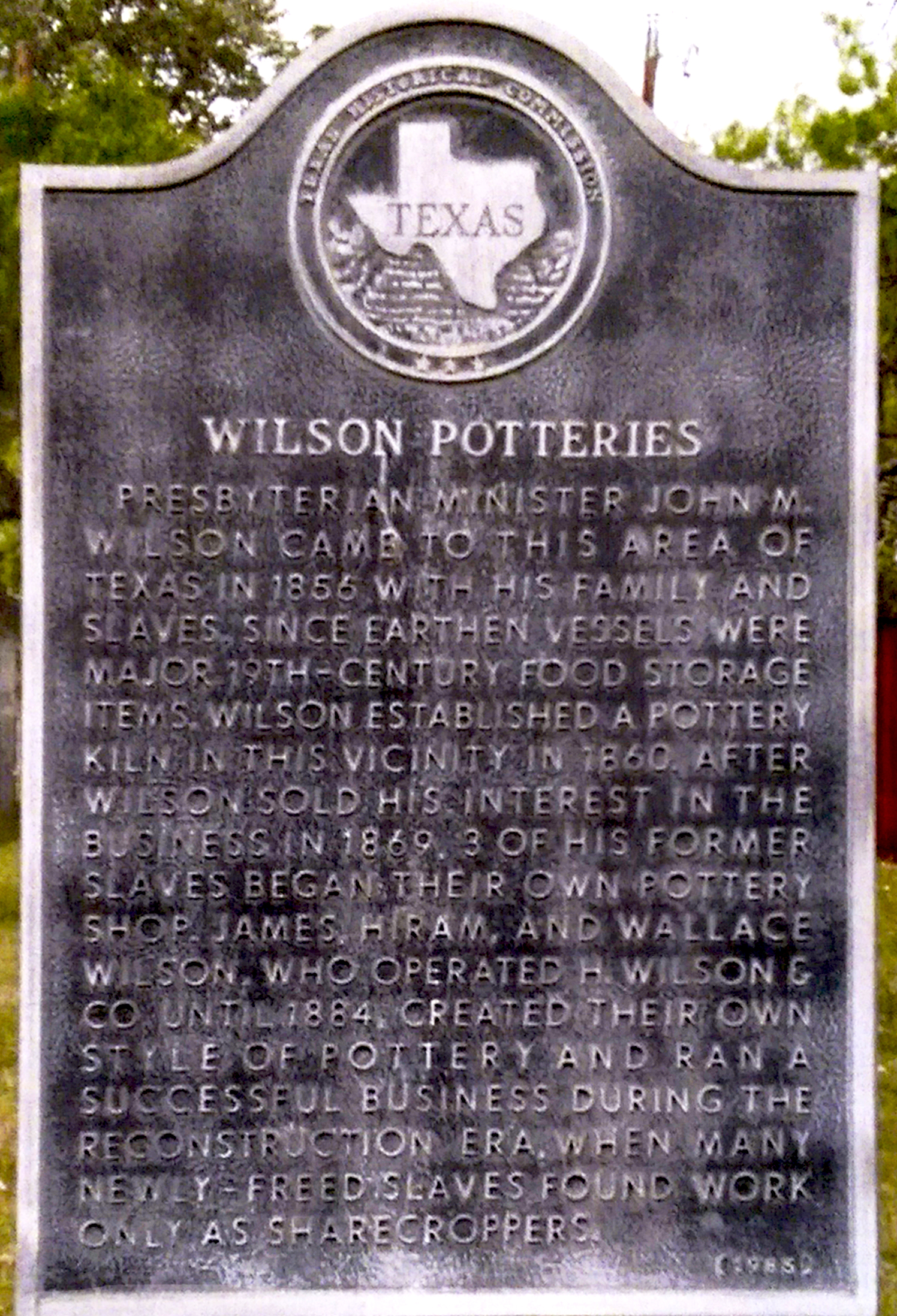
- Industry: Pottery production
- Founded: 1860 in Capote, Texas
- Founder: John McKamey Wilson, Guadalupe Pottery Hiram Wilson, H. Wilson & Co. Marion Durham and John Chandler, Durham-Chandler-Wilson Pottery
- Defunct: 1903
- Website: Wilson Pottery Foundation

The Wilson Potteries were three related potteries that operated in Capote, Texas, near Seguin, in the latter half of the 19th century, supplying a wide swath of the state with locally made stoneware vessels for food storage and preparation. One of these, H. Wilson & Co., is thought to be the first African-American-owned business in the state.

== Overview ==
Three potteries are known collectively as the Wilson Potteries. The first, founded by Rev. John McKamey Wilson, operated as the Guadalupe pottery (1860–1866) with Wilson's slaves producing the ware.

Following emancipation, former slave Hiram Wilson (sometimes spelled Hyrum or Hirum) established and ran the H. Wilson & Co. pottery, with the assistance of fellow former Wilson slaves James, Wallace, George and Andrew, from about 1869 to 1884.

After Hiram's death, James and Wallace Wilson bought into the Wilson-Durham-Chandler pottery, which had opened in 1869. They worked as partners with two potters from South Carolina, Marion Durham, a white man, and John Chandler, an African American, until the business closed in 1903.

== Guadalupe Pottery ==
Rev. John M. Wilson was born in North Carolina and attended Washington College (now Washington and Lee). He graduated with a law degree, but changed careers in 1838 to become a licensed Presbyterian minister. In 1853, he moved his family to Missouri. During the next four years he built a seminary and a girls school before heading further west to Texas. It is speculated, he also did extensive research into pottery production at this time. He arrived with his household, which included 20 enslaved people, in Seguin in 1857.

Years later, in an article Wilson wrote for The Texas Almanac (1870), he reflected on the motivation for the move and his choice of location from both a practical and profit perspective.

From the high price of stoneware, and the demand for it, I felt that the pottery business would be profitable... During the war, western Texas was supplied by my pottery greatly to the convenience of the country. Now, very little stoneware is introduced into this region from abroad, the demand being met by the produce of my Guadalupe potter, at a price much lower than can be imported.

The piece concluded with a scholarly dissertation on the chemical makeup and properties of local clay and sand, and a general discussion of geological formations in Central Texas.

In about 1860, the first Wilson pottery, called the Guadalupe Pottery, was founded by Rev. Wilson to manufacture alkaline (ash)- and salt-glazed ware. He had leased land upon his arrival to set up a pottery. Along with his son, E.F. Wilson, and Dr. R.M. Tate, the reverend signed a 25-year lease with T.N. and Ann Minter for $1.00 for a tract of land along the Guadalupe River. More specifically, the site was on the river's Salt Creek tributary on the Carrizo Sand formation of the Wilcox geologic group. The lease gave permission to use the land for constructing buildings, rearing animals and building the necessary fixtures for a pottery business. It also gave the lessors rights to any water, wood, stone and clay found on the property.

In the Texas Almanac article, Wilson admitted he had no previous knowledge of stoneware pottery production when he arrived in Texas. The 1860 Guadalupe County Census recorded no one with the occupation "potter", which strongly suggests the Guadalupe Pottery's master potter was a slave. The later establishment of a pottery by Hiram, James and Wallace Wilson implies that these three enslaved individuals were previously the potters at Wilson's manufacturing site.

It is not clear from whom Wilson's enslaved potters learned the trade. They might have been taught by traveling foreigners, possibly two Englishmen named Parker and Lyons. More likely, they learned from resident artisans who had migrated west at about the same time: Isaac Suttles, Marion Durham and John Chandler.

Suttles is probably responsible for introducing salt glazing at the first Wilson site, since the glaze was dominant in his home state of Ohio. The attributes of Edgefield, South Carolina pottery were likely taught to Wilson's slaves by Durham and Chandler, both of whom came from well-known pottery-making families in the region. Among these elements are the use of slip-trailed decoration, the attachment of jug handles from pot shoulder to body (rather than neck to body), the application of wheel-thrown lugs on large storage jars, and the production of flat-topped, "tie-down" rims. This style of rim is simply thickened at the mouth and can be covered by a cloth tied beneath the protrusion.

The Guadalupe Pottery produced utilitarian stoneware for approximately 12 years. Rev. Wilson's interest in the business began to wane with the onset of civil war. Two of his sons fought for the Confederacy. The prosperity Seguin had known before the war waned. By 1866, when Texans finally learned of the Emancipation Proclamation of 1863, Wilson no longer had a source of free labor. He sold the business to Marion Durham on September 29, 1869. A few of his newly freed workers split off from the pottery to establish their own shop.

== H. Wilson & Co. ==
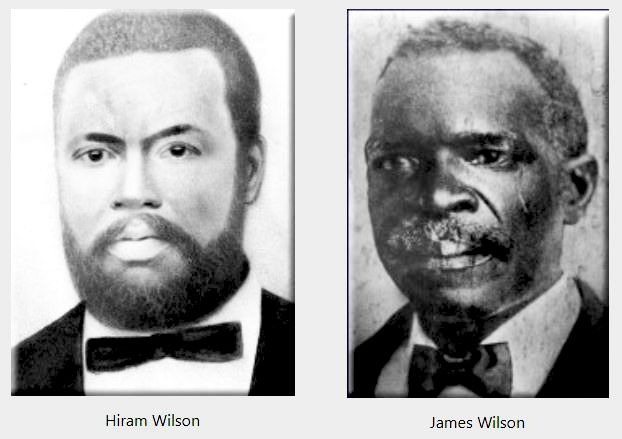
H. Wilson & Co. founders

After the war, most of Wilson's slaves continued to be employed by former slave holders as sharecroppers in and around Seguin, tying the men to the land in a manner much like slavery. Hiram, however, saw the potential for the establishment of another pottery in South-Central Texas. Taking their former master's surname, Hiram, James, Wallace, George and Andrew founded H. Wilson & Co. It is not known if the Wilson potters were related or only brothers in slavery.

It is unclear why they broke away from the white pottery, however, the decision was made at a time of considerable friction between whites and freedman in Guadalupe County. Additionally, pottery making was a valuable skill at the time, so continuing to work as potters even after emancipation would not have been surprising.

H. Wilson & Co. went into production between 1869 and 1872 on land granted to them by their former master. The business was located farther from the main road than the Guadalupe Pottery and on a different creek. The business probably included at least one work shed with pottery wheel, a pug mill for processing clay and a groundhog kiln.

According to James Wilson's son, work at the pottery was seasonal. Ware could only be produced between March and September because cold weather adversely affected the clay's consistency. Clay would be dug, however, and place in large vats until spring, when it would be mixed with water and kneaded to the proper texture.

The business continued some traditions of the original pottery, such as ovoid vessel shape and the use of a groundhog kiln, but added new techniques. There are five major differences between pottery made at the original site and that produced by H. Wilson & Co. The most obvious was the near-exclusive use of salt glazing. This may have resulted from unfamiliarity with the alkaline glaze formula. Another difference was the use of a rich, dark slip for the vessels' interior. Since it was unlike local materials, it may have been imported. H. Wilson & Co. produced thrown lids for containers, rather than making tie down rims and created a unique horseshoe-shaped jar handle, which was less prone to breakage. The potters also began stamping their work with the company's name, a practice not followed by most of their contemporaries.

The pottery ceased operations upon Hiram's death. The loss of his leadership was likely ample reason for the decision, though James Wilson's son later reported that good clay had become scarce.

=== Hiram Wilson, community leader ===
In many ways, Hiram Wilson was similar to his old master, Rev. J. M. Wilson.

Wilson went on to other accomplishments in the community and beyond. In addition to owning the pottery business, He became a Baptist minister, educated at Bishop College and founded the Capote Baptist Church. He worked to bring opportunities for education to his people by building a school in Capote and working with the Guadalupe Baptist District Association to found Guadalupe College.

He died in 1884 at only 48 years of age. His headstone is still recognizable beside Capote Baptist Church.

== Durham-Chandler-Wilson Pottery ==
After Hiram's death, James and Wallace left H. Wilson & Co. to become part owners of the Durham & Chandler Pottery. The pair had migrated to Texas from South Carolina in the 1860s and purchased John Wilson's equipment when he shuttered his business.

Their manufacturing site was moved closer to the raw clay source and the road connecting Seguin to Capote. Both salt- and alkaline-glazed ware was produced and both kiln types, groundhog and beehive, were in use. The pottery remained in business until 1903 when the Salt Creek flooded the grounds.

== The ware ==
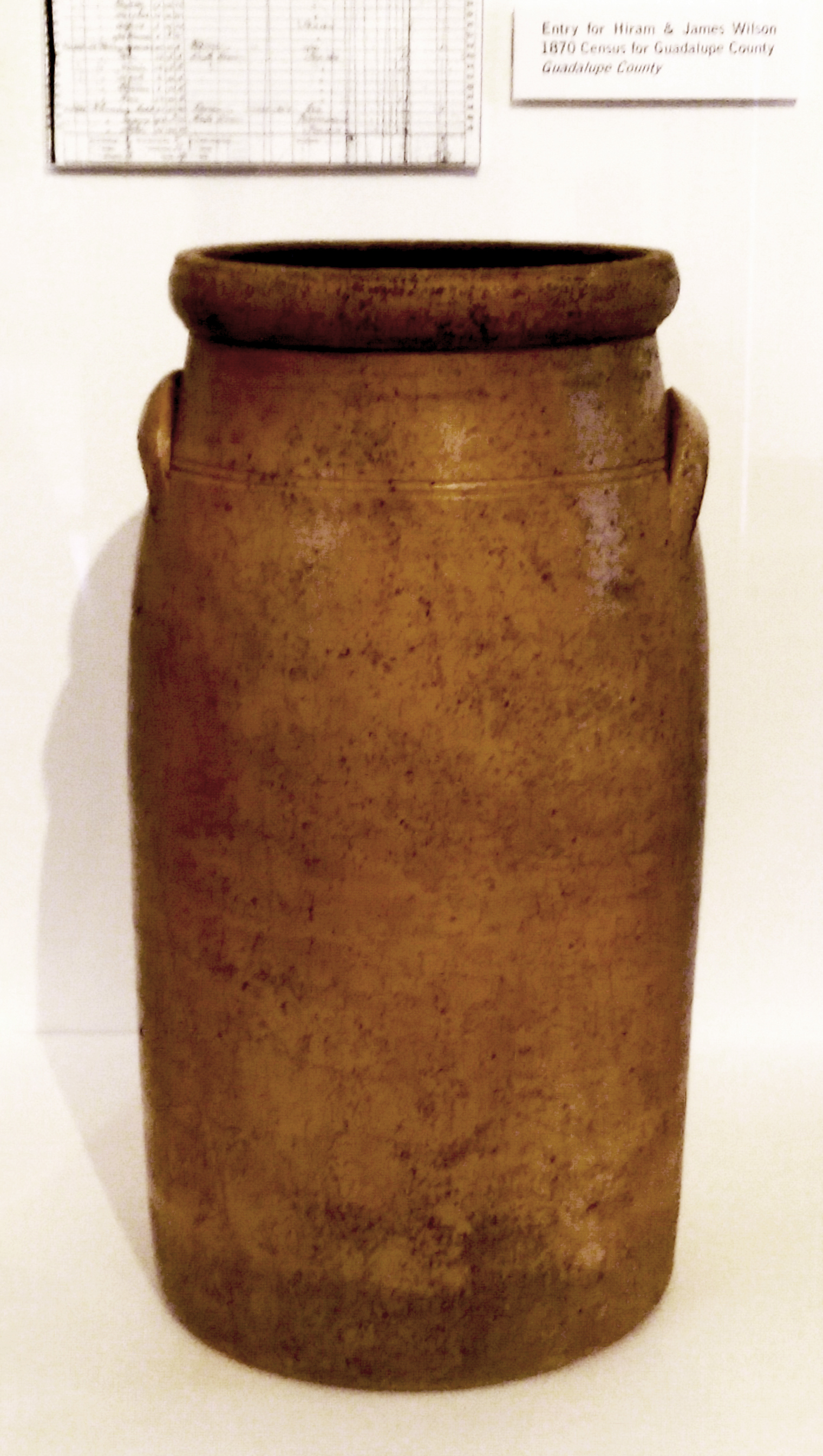
H. Wilson & Co. churn with horseshoe handles

All Wilson manufacturing sites made traditional, utilitarian vessels representative of the era: jugs, pitchers, crocks, churns, bowls, chicken waterers and fat lamps. The pottery was employed for storing lard, milk, meat, water, and pickled vegetables, for making butter, serving foods and beverages, and for other uses.

Wilson pottery was made from fine red clay sourced from Guadalupe County creeks with geological origins in the Carrizo Sands of the Wilcox Formation. This deposit extends from western Alabama through Central Texas. The high quality clay enabled the production of stoneware, a ceramic material between earthenware and porcelain in hardness and vitrification, which depends on the clay's silica content and the firing temperature (for stoneware, a temperature of 1200 °C to 1300 °C is necessary). The Wilson potters needed only to add fine sand to achieve the desired vitrification.

To produce stoneware vessels, the clay would be mixed with additive ingredients (in the Wilson case this included silica), left to dry and age, and then moistened again and ground on a mule-drawn pug mill. The clay received its final shape on a kick wheel or treadle wheel.

Cross draft groundhog kilns were employed at all three Wilson potteries. The third pottery also used an updraft beehive kiln. Groundhog kilns were a standard feature of potteries in the southern and southeastern U.S. They typically consisted of a long burrow-like chamber (hence the name) with a chimney at the elevated end. More common in the north, the beehive kiln was shaped like a bee skep, with a circular base and domed top.

Salt glazing produced earth tones ranging from silvery grays and blues to deep greens and browns. Alkaline glaze assumed a spectrum from golden yellow, to celadon, to chocolate brown or brick red. A number of factors influenced color, including the makeup of the clay, the vessel's placement in the kiln and its proximity to the heat.

== Archeological research ==
There are three locations in Capote where the various Wilson potteries fired ware and hand made bricks for use in kiln construction. The sites are listed in the State of Texas Register of Historic Places as location 41GU4, 41GU5 and 41GU6. Site 41GU6 is the location of Rev. Wilson's original Guadalupe Pottery. Site 41GU5 is the H. Wilson and Co. site worked by Hiram, James and Wallace Wilson. Site 41GU4 is the location where John Chandler, Marion Durham and James Wilson produced their ware. Site 41GU4, also known as Site #3, is the most accessible in today's Capote Hills area; it is located on FM 466 in eastern Guadalupe County.

In 1981, a magnetometry survey of the original site was conducted as part of a University of Texas masters' thesis by E. Joe Brackner Jr. The data revealed the remains of an oblong groundhog kiln and a metal object thought to be part of a clay-mixing pug mill. At the time of Brackner's study, a large waster pile was also visible on the surface of the site. The ceramic shards were salt- and alkaline-glazed.

Brackner's research also included the H. Wilson and Co. site, where he found one small groundhog kiln, which was clearly visible on the surface at the time, but later destroyed by looters. Two waster piles were also in existence. The pottery shards were either treated with brown slip on the entire vessel or with brown slip on the interior and salt glaze on the exterior.

=== Studies at the Wilson-Durham-Chandler site ===
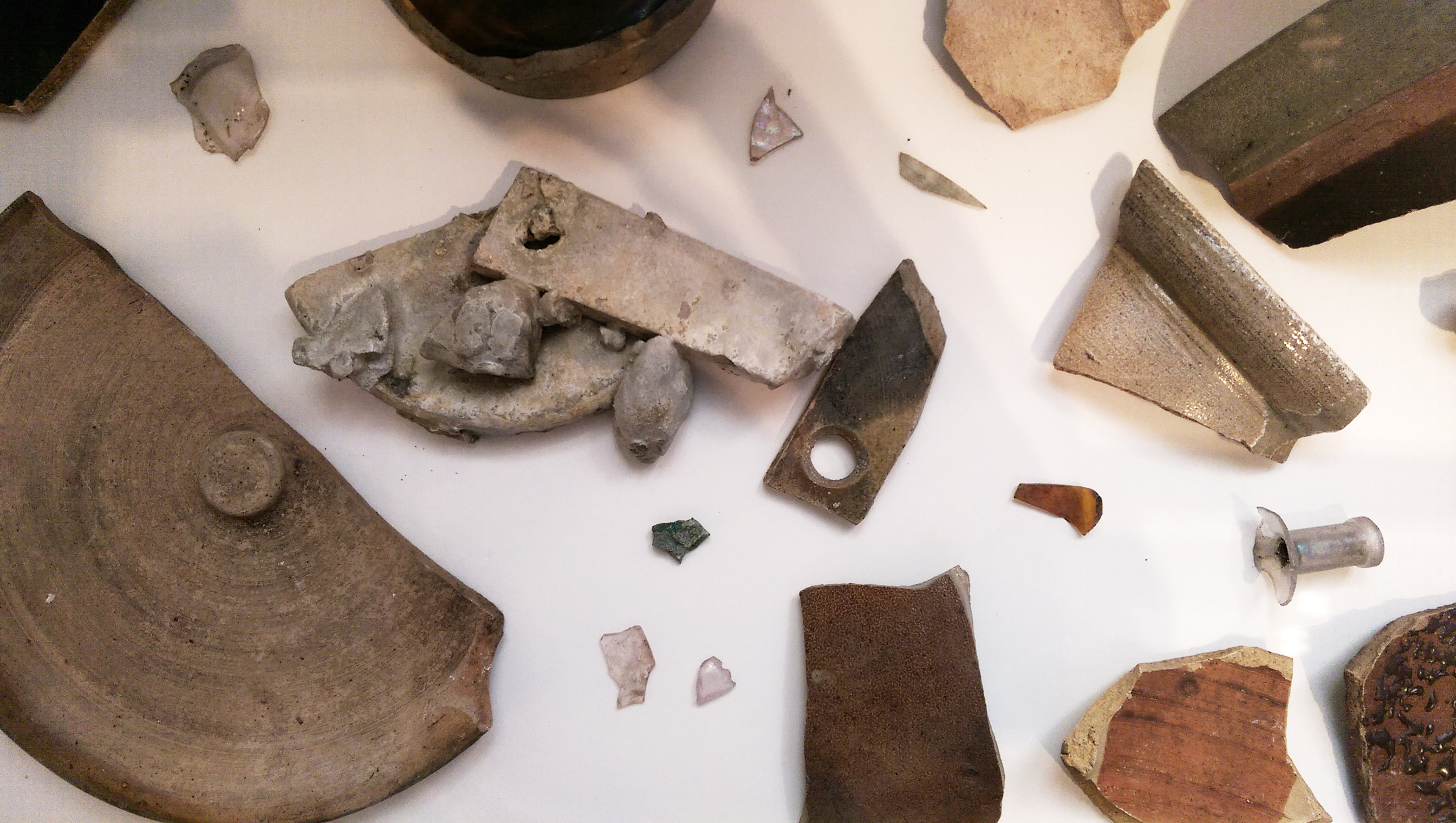
Ceramic shards and other artifacts from the Wilson Potteries

The condition of 41GU4, the former Wilson-Durham-Chandler pottery, is far superior to that of the other two sites. The Center for Archaeological Studies at Texas State University investigated the Wilson-Durham-Chandler site in 2007-2008 under a contract with the Wilson Pottery Foundation. Through a Preservation Trust Fund Grant from the Texas Historical Commission (THC), funds were acquired for its conservation. The other sites are still under the control of private landowners. The objectives of the work included the documentation and conservation of the pottery's remains. The archeological evidence suggest a successful business at Wilson-Durham-Chandler, with kilns and waster piles.

During the archeological investigations, the groundhog and beehive kilns were carefully excavated. The beehive kiln was revealed in its entirety, while much of the groundhog kiln was exposed. The excavations stopped when the THC decided to declare the site a State Archaeological Landmark. The kilns were ultimately backfilled with clean, soft sand to hold the kiln architecture in place and preserve it from further destruction.

Excavations of the kilns yielded thousands of artifacts including 16,000 salt- and alkaline-glazed shards: lids, lids with knobs, handles, rims, and jug tops; maker's stamps; kiln furniture; six pieces of a one quart jar; one whole jar; and one clay marble, as well as some glass and other miscellaneous non-ceramic items.

== Wilson Pottery Foundation ==
LaVerne Lewis Britt, great-great-granddaughter of Hiram Wilson, established the Wilson Pottery Foundation with twelve other members of the board of directors in 1999. The foundation works to acquire and preserve Wilson pottery sites, and teach the public the history of the Wilson potters.

Since the foundation's formation, collectors pieces of Wilson Pottery have been acquired and saved for exhibition. Britt purchased the first pot for this purpose from a resident of New Braunfels, Texas. Since then, several pieces have been donated or purchased by the foundation. Although Wilson vessels are modest utilitarian pots once used for simple purposes, they have significant symbolic value as they represent the works of freedman labor and advancement in an important time in U.S. history.

In 1999, the foundation was able to purchase the Wilson-Durham-Chandler site. It provides the family with direct access to the pottery workshop and the spaces in which their ancestors labored. Through a Preservation Trust Fund Grant from the THC, funds were acquired for conservation. In 1985, a State of Texas Historical Marker was erected in front of Capote Baptist Church on FM 466.

The Wilson Pottery Foundation also works to disseminate historical knowledge at events in Seguin and across Texas. The Wilson Antique Pottery Collectors Show, previously called the Texas Collector's Pottery Show, has been held annually in October since 2003. Sponsored by the Wilson Pottery Foundation, the show brings together antiques collectors to exchange pottery and information on antique pottery, and helps the foundation seek additional Wilson pieces.

Every three years, the foundation hosts a three-day family reunion that is open to the public. Hundreds of Wilson family members come together to celebrate each other and the community of Seguin, which has worked hard to preserve the legacy left behind by their ancestors.

== Wilson Pottery Museum ==
The Wilson Pottery Museum opened in 2013 as part of the historic Sebastopol House in Seguin. It contains Wilson Pottery pieces as well as items of interest related to the Wilson family legacy. The building itself is a Greek Revival limecrete edifice constructed in 1856 by slaves.

H. Wilson and Co. pottery is highly collectible. Many of the 1,000 or so existing vessels have been auctioned off to wealthy pottery collectors. A single piece can bring several thousand dollars. Some collectors are willing to sell, however, the family cannot afford to purchase items for inclusion in the museum. The foundation is seeking benefactors to help fund the recovery of these treasures.

The 41GU4 site is maintained by the foundation as a place where Wilson family members can enjoy the landscape and cultural remains of the Wilson-Durham-Chandler Pottery. They conduct tours and make presentations at the site and educate younger generations of the Wilson family on the significant contributions their ancestors made.
