= John Park (inventor) =

John Esten Park (1814 - 1872), educated in chemistry and medicine, experimented with using concrete to construct buildings before the American Civil War. His work left the town of Seguin, Texas, with a large concentration of 19th-century concrete structures.

== Early years ==
John E. Park was born in 1814, in Eatonton, Putnam County, Georgia, to James and Martha (Yandell) Park. About 1835, he married Rebecca Rosella Hubbard (1808-1877); they had seven children. He studied at the Louisville Medical Institute in Kentucky. His interest in concrete construction may have come from familiarity with the burgeoning Louisville cement industry, spurred by the widespread use of concrete able to harden under water for dams, locks, sewers, and other construction along the Ohio River.

Dr. Park took his family to Seguin, probably in 1846. There in Central Texas he found that the materials necessary for concrete production (gravel, sand, lime, and clay) were readily available. Gravel beds and sand bars occurred along the Guadalupe River. Lime could be made from limestone quarried nearby or from rocks washed down the river bottom. Caliche, thick sedimentary deposits of gravelly clay, lay so close to the surface that it was often dug to make a basement before being used in the concrete mix.

By early 1847, Park had constructed a one-story hotel using concrete. This time frame can be established because the famed Texas Ranger Jack Hays was married to the hotel owner's daughter, "in the south room of the concrete portion of the hotel on April 29, 1847". The hotel then served stagecoach riders for almost 30 years. The Magnolia Hotel was probably Park's first concrete building, and it certainly is the oldest still standing.

== Making limecrete ==
As a general contractor, Park also built the 1850 Guadalupe Male Academy (still standing) and the 1852 Female Department building (long lost). The non-reinforced concrete gravel-wall method promoted by Park was used in Seguin for 100 or more structures, including cisterns, walls, barns, etc., of which about 20 buildings remain extant. Park came to have imitators and competitors whose buildings are included in the total. The best known of the survivors is the Sebastopol House Historic Site, built in Greek Revival style in 1854-56.

Frederick Law Olmsted passed through Seguin in the 1850s, a few years before he became famous after winning the commission to design New York's Central Park.. His dispatches to the New York Times became a book, 'A Journey through Texas'. In it he described the process: "A number of buildings in Seguin are made of concrete thick walls of gravel and lime, raised a foot at a time, between boards, which hold the mass in place until it is solidified. As the materials are dug from the cellar, it is a very cheap mode of construction, is neat in appearance and is said to be as durable while protected by a good roof, as stone or brick."

The method called 'Park's concrete', or more generically 'limecrete', utilized the natural aggregate found locally. The gravel or caliche was pulverized and mixed with sand, portions of burned lime, and water to form a workable slurry. (Clay was often added and sometimes organic materials, such as straw, horsehair, or animal bones.) Boards were constructed into a form about a foot or 18 inches wide, held together with screws or bolts, about three feet apart. The mixture was poured in "rounds", "pours", or "lifts" of about a foot to 15 inches high between the form boards, and allowed to solidify, which required about 48 hours. The bolts or screws left small voids about an inch in diameter in the hardened concrete. Pieces of hardwood approximately one inch square were used as spacers to hold the board forms apart. They were left cast in, to be used as nailers for wainscoting and trim. Then the forms were raised and the process repeated.

Some of the houses were elegant mansions, notably the Col. Joseph F. Johnson Home, the Campbell House (half ruined by fire, now owned by City of Seguin), and Sebastopol. The two-story Johnson home, begun in 1847, is finished with black walnut woodwork on the doors, windows, and stairs. Other prominent buildings included churches and the courthouse. So many concrete walls were erected that some observers said Seguin was a walled city, like those in Europe in the Middle Ages.

On the larger buildings, the actual physical work was done by slaves, of course, under the supervision of men like Col. Johnson (who owned seven slaves when he began building his house), or in the case of Sebastopol, of Col. Joshua Young (who owned 17).

Smaller houses could be built largely by their owners, with carpenters called in to finish the doors and windows.

== Later years ==
John E. Park applied for and received several patents for concrete construction.

When the Civil War came in 1861, Dr. Park served as a surgeon in Hood's Brigade. The war ended in 1865 with the South in economic chaos, and Park was living in Tennessee by 1869. John Park then returned to Austin, Texas to work with concrete again.

Park became ill and died of a heart attack on April 30, 1872.

For a while, others continued to build with limecrete in Seguin. But the arrival of the railroad in 1876 brought cheap lumber, brick-making equipment, and eventually Portland cement, as its manufacturing methods continued to improve. The last limecrete building erected was probably the former Baptist Church, 1877, which was demolished in 2016 after a fire. Then Seguin's era as "the Mother of Concrete Cities" drew to a close.
