= Sebastopol House Historic Site =

Historic house in Texas, United States

- Sebastopol
- U.S. National Register of Historic Places
- Former Texas State Historic Site
- Texas State Antiquities Landmark
- Recorded Texas Historic Landmark
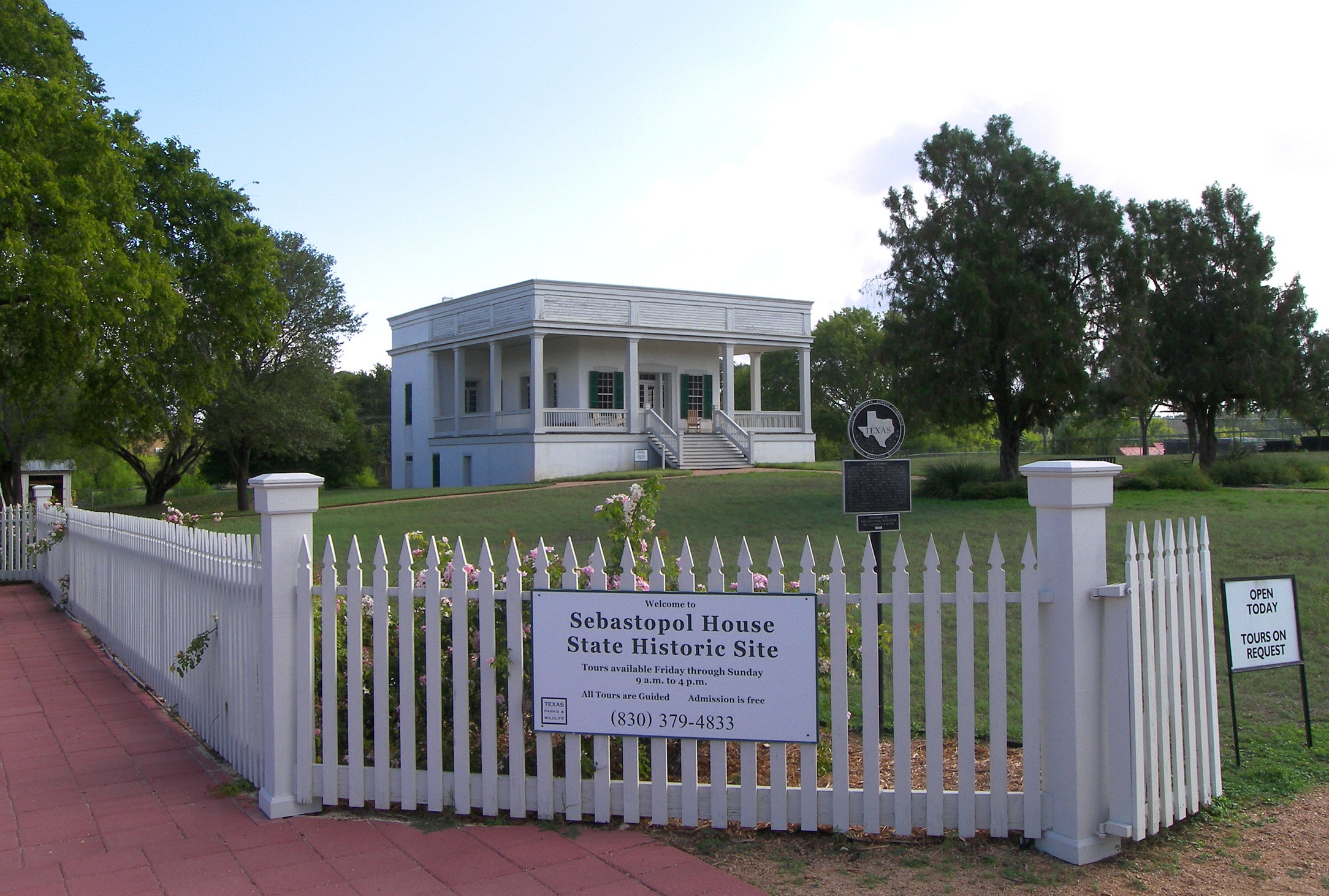
- Sebastopol House Historic Site in 2008

- Location within Texas Location within the United States
- Interactive map showing the location of Sebastopol
- Location: 704 Zorn Street, Seguin, Texas, USA
- Coordinates: 29°34′9″N 97°58′21″W
- Area: 2.2 acres (0.89 ha)
- Built: 1850
- Architect: Henry Erkel, et al.
- Architectural style: Greek Revival
- NRHP reference No.: 70000751
- TSAL No.: 301
- RTHL No.: 4627

Significant dates
- Added to NRHP: August 25, 1970
- Designated TSHS: 1989
- Designated TSAL: June 28, 1983
- Designated RTHL: 1964
- Delisted TSHS: 2011

Sebastopol House Historic Site is an antebellum Greek Revival house built of concrete, located in Seguin, Texas, United States. Joshua W. Young built it between 1854 and 1856 for his sister, Catherine LeGette. Today Sebastopol is one of some 20 surviving buildings that give Seguin the largest concentration of early 19th-century structures in the U.S.

As a result of its unusual concrete construction, Sebastopol House was included in the Historic American Buildings Survey (H.A.B.S.) in 1936, made a Registered Texas Historical Landmark in 1964, and then listed on the National Register of Historic Places on August 25, 1970. It is a prime example of the limecrete structures of Seguin. The house is constructed entirely of unreinforced cast-in-place concrete and it is one of the oldest and largest structures in the state using this building method.

This process was developed and patented by doctor and chemist John Park, who had moved to Seguin in 1846. But he soon had imitators and competitors, contractors like Joshua Young. Often slaves did the hard physical work, using boards to build forms, kept at the right width (12 to 18 inches) by screws and oak spacers when the limecrete mixture was poured into the forms, and allowed to harden. Then the forms were raised another foot or so and the process repeated.

A large part of the "Park's concrete" mix was caliche, a thick deposit of gravelly clay that underlies Seguin. Usually the caliche was dug out on site, providing a basement level, as at Sebastopol. The caliche was then mixed with sand, lime made from nearby limestone deposits, and organic materials like straw or horsehair. The exterior walls were usually whitewashed, and the interiors often had woodwork or wainscoting of local walnut, oak or pecan.

Joseph Zorn Jr. bought the house in 1874 and it remained in the Zorn family until 1961. Zorn was mayor of Seguin from 1890 to 1910, and played a major role in establishing the first system of free public schools in the town.

The Texas Parks and Wildlife Department acquired the house and grounds by purchase in 1976 from the Seguin Conservation Society, which by agreement had preserved the house until the state agency could get funds for the restoration in its budget. Sebastopol was again opened to the public in September 1989. The house is restored to its 1880s appearance. In 2011 ownership was transferred to the City of Seguin.

== See also ==
- National Register of Historic Places listings in Guadalupe County, Texas
- Recorded Texas Historic Landmarks in Guadalupe County
