= Flash Flood Alley =

Flood-prone region of Texas

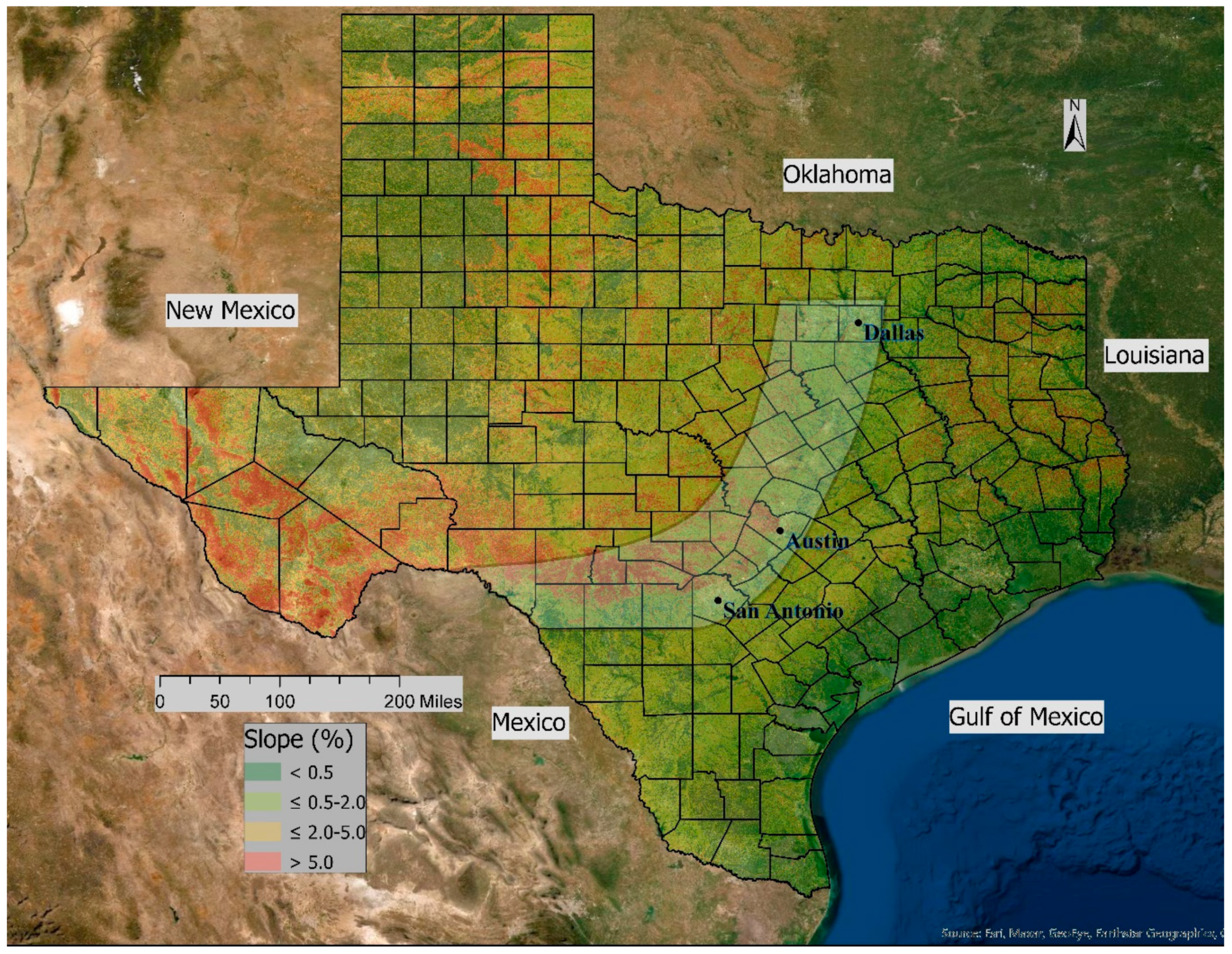
Area of Flash Flood Alley; the lighter curved region running from Dallas down through San Antonio

Flash Flood Alley is an area of Central Texas that is considered the most flash-flood prone region in the United States.

== Location ==
People don't realize what [the Guadalupe River] can do and how quickly it can do it ... It's not like the Mississippi or a lot of the other rivers that just constantly come up slowly. You know this river in ten minutes can be up 20 or 30 feet.

— Sheriff Hierholzer, May 2016 Kerr County Commissioners Court meeting

Flash Flood Alley covers a crescent-shaped band along the Balcones Escarpment from west of San Antonio through Austin and Waco to the east of Dallas. The area includes the Guadalupe River and Colorado River basins. According to the Guadalupe-Blanco River Authority, the Guadalupe basin is "one of the three most dangerous regions in the country for flash floods".

== Causes ==
The area experiences typical flooding in heavy rainstorms which often fill streets or lowlying areas and cause damage. Flash floods occur when the location of rain, heaviness of rain, and duration of rain combine to overload drainage streams and rivers in a very short time.

The area is naturally prone to flash floods due to a combination of topography, geology, and climate. The issue is exacerbated by settlement patterns and development patterns in the region.

The area has a karst terrain of worn limestone on steep hills and includes broad, shallow, normally slow-moving rivers that wind among the hills and into valleys. The area is semi-arid with rocky and shallow clay soils, which means soils don't soak up water but allows it to sheet off. When warm air from the Gulf hits the nearby Balcones Escarpment, it moves up the escarpments, condenses, and causes precipitation, which can pour down the hills quickly and fill streams and rivers. According to Texas State University geographer Richard Earl, "The region has some of the highest flood discharge per unit area of a drainage basin in the country".

Storms move into the area from both the Pacific and the Gulf, and cooler air moves in from the Great Plains, causing an orographic effect. The moist, warm air from the Gulf and the Pacific meeting the cooler air from the north make intense rainfall a regular occurrence throughout the region.

A similar effect can happen in cities with large amounts of paved land and outdated drainage systems, such as San Antonio, and can be exacerbated by overgrazing in rural areas. Multiple populated areas in the region are situated along streambeds within flood plains between hills which act as a natural funnel. According to Earl, city planners have often allowed developers to build in ways that also exacerbate the issue in populated areas, such as by building in flood plains and not using permeable paving materials.

According to CNN's reports on the 2025 floods, global warming is making rainstorms deliver more rain, as a warmer atmosphere can hold more moisture. According to Climate Central, San Antonio rainfall intensity has increased by 6% since 1970 while Austin's has risen by 19%, meaning that more rain falls in a given hour than did decades ago.

== Major floods ==
According to flood expert Hatim Sharif, a hydrologist and civil engineer at the University of Texas at San Antonio, "Texas as a whole leads the nation in flood deaths, and by a wide margin." According to Austin meteorologist Mary Wasson, in the period between 2011 and 2021 Texas experienced 500 flash floods.

=== 1913 ===
In December 1913 between 10 and 15 inches of rain fell in the greater area. 180 people died. Torrential rains fell across Central Texas starting the morning of 5 December, swelling the Brazos River and causing it to shift course. The Colorado River overflowed its banks and joined the Brazos. The Brazos River and Valley Improvement Association formed in 1915 to address flooding issues. The first Lake Waco Dam was built in 1929. The Trinity River also flooded.

=== 1921 ===
In September 1921, a Category 1 hurricane made landfall in Mexico and moved into Texas. According to the U.S. Geological Survey, from 8–10 September the San Antonio area received 7.38 inches of rain. 215 people died. San Antonio developed flood control plans, including the Olmos Dam and River Walk. Thrall received an estimated 40 inches of rain, Austin received 19, and San Antonio 15. The Little and San Gabriel Rivers also flooded.

=== 1935 ===
Near Uvalde, 22 inches of rain fell in under three hours.

=== 1978 ===
In July 1978, tropical storm Amelia made landfall and moved inland, stalling over the headwaters of the Medina and Guadalupe Rivers. The Guadalupe crested at over 40 feet in Comfort. Thirty-three people drowned in the flooding.

=== 1981 ===
Shoal Creek flooded 24 May when a slow-moving storm settled over Austin. Thirteen people died.

=== 1987 ===
On July 17, 1987, a sudden flash flood swept a bus full of children away at a low water crossing and killed ten near Comfort, Texas. On the night of July 16, and into the next morning, slow-moving storms dropped between 5 and 10 inches of rain, triggering immense flooding along the Guadalupe through Ingram, Hunt, Kerrvile, and Comfort. The Pot O' Gold camp was evacuating when a bus was swept away.

In 1989, the story of the deaths and rescues was shown as the pilot episode of Rescue 911, and in 1993 was made into a television movie called The Flood: Who Will Save Our Children? The film followed the experiences of some of the children and their families, and starred Joe Spano as Reverend Richard Koons.

=== 1998 ===
The remnants of Hurricane Madeline and Hurricane Lester flooded the San Jacinto, San Benard, Colorado, Lavaca, Guadalupe, and San Antonio Rivers in October 1998, killing 31. The city of San Antonio experienced a 500-year flood.

=== 2002 ===
The Guadalupe River flooded in July 2002 after the area received over 19 inches (480 mm) of rain. Some parts of the area received a year's precipitation over a few days. 12 people died.

=== 2007 ===
In June, a slow-moving frontal system caused heavy rains. Marble Falls, one of the hardest hit areas, received 18 inches (460 mm) of rain in a period six hours. The headwaters of Lake Marble Falls and Lake Travis had 19 inches of rain totals recorded. Two people died.^{[3]}

=== 2013 ===
==== May ====
In May, the Olmos basin received over 17 inches of rain over the Memorial Day weekend, causing 2 deaths.

==== October ====
In October, in a 100-year flood, the Onion Creek rose to its highest levels since 1921, killing four.

=== 2015 ===
In a 100-year flood, the Blanco River rose 45 feet and caused 13 deaths and severe damage in Wimberley over Memorial Day Weekend. The river had been at 5 feet at 9 pm on May 24, and by 1 am had reached 40 feet. Wimberley installed a monitoring system to send out cellphone alerts.

=== 2018 ===
In a 100-year flood, the Llano River washed out the Kingsland Bridge.

=== 2025 ===
==== June ====
In June, flash flooding in San Antonio killed 13 people. The area upstream had received over 7 inches of rain in three hours, which qualified as a 100-year event. It was the city's highest daily rainfall in over a decade and the 10th highest ever recorded.

On June 12, heavy rain began around 2 am. Within hours at least fifteen cars were swept off Loop 410 when Beitel Creek, which runs parallel to the road, flooded. At least eleven people were killed in the Beitel Creek area, with two others killed in nearby areas. According to the San Antonio River Authority, over 400 yards of the westbound access road lie within the 100-year-floodplain.

==== July ====
On July 4, four months' worth of rain fell within hours in and around the Texas Hill Country, due to a mesoscale convective vortex, resulting in over 135 deaths in the region, including many children attending Camp Mystic along the Guadalupe River.

At 4:00 a.m. the National Weather Service issued a particularly dangerous situation warning for communities along the Guadalupe. In Hunt, Texas, where the two branches of the Guadalupe River meet, the river gauge recorded a 22 feet (6.7 m) rise in 2 hours before failing when it reached 29 feet (8.8 m). Downstream in Kerrville, the river surged to 21 feet (6.4 m). Further downstream, in Comfort, it surged to 29.86 feet (9.10 m). The city of Kerrville issued a disaster declaration on 4 July following the floods. In total, 5–11 inches (130–280 mm) of rain fell on some areas that experienced significant flood effects.

Flooding continued into Saturday, 5 July with two more flash flood emergencies being issued for areas around Lake Travis north of Austin. Later, a third flash flood emergency was issued for central Comal County, noting that "local law enforcement reported flooding of the Guadalupe River". 20.33 inches (516 mm) of rain fell northwest of Streeter.

== See also ==
- List of flash floods
- Hailstorm Alley
- Tornado Alley
