= Texas flooding =

Texas flooding may refer to:

- September 1921 San Antonio floods
- October 1998 Central Texas floods
- June 2007 Texas flooding
- 2015 Texas–Oklahoma flood and tornado outbreak
- Major floods caused by Hurricane Harvey in 2017
- July 2025 Central Texas floods
- Flash Flood Alley

== See also ==
- Texas Flood (disambiguation)
