= Olmos Dam =

Dam in Texas, United States

Coordinates: 29.4735°N 98.4742°W

Olmos Dam is a detention dam located on the San Antonio River in San Antonio, Texas. It was built in the 1920s, following the disastrous September 1921 San Antonio floods. Work began on the dam on January 19, 1925, and it was completed in 1926; in 1929 a cut-off channel, to allow excess water to bypass the Great Bend in downtown, was completed.

In the 1970s, improvements were made by the City of San Antonio and the San Antonio River Authority. In March 1979, an improvement was made to strengthen and anchor the dam, as well as modifying gate operations, in order to provide an emergency spillway.

There are six gates within the dam, two of which are open at all times to a height of 2 ft (0.61 m). They are rotated once a week. Each gate is controlled via an actuator that is situated inside the dam's gatehouse.

San Antonio Express-News history columnist Paula Allen has referred to the dam as "the jewel in the crown of San Antonio’s system of flood control."

It has become a "staple structure north of downtown San Antonio."

Excavations in the area around Olmos Dam, both prior to the dam's construction in the 1920s and in subsequent excavations such as in 1979, have yielded a good number of Native American artifacts.

== See also ==
- Flash Flood Alley
- List of dams and reservoirs in Texas
