= The Rookie (2002 film) =

2002 film by John Lee Hancock

- Theatrical release poster
- Directed by: John Lee Hancock
- Written by: Mike Rich
- Produced by: Mark Ciardi; Gordon Gray; Mark Johnson
- Starring: Dennis Quaid; Rachel Griffiths; Jay Hernandez; Brian Cox
- Cinematography: John Schwartzman
- Edited by: Eric L. Beason
- Music by: Carter Burwell
- Production companies: Walt Disney Pictures; Gran Via
- Distributed by: Buena Vista Pictures Distribution
- Release date: March 29, 2002
- Running time: 128 minutes
- Country: United States
- Language: English
- Budget: $22 million
- Box office: $80.7 million

The Rookie is a 2002 American sports drama film directed by John Lee Hancock and produced by Walt Disney Pictures. It is based on the true story of Jim Morris who debuted in Major League Baseball at age 35. The film stars Dennis Quaid as Morris, alongside Rachel Griffiths, Jay Hernandez, Angus T. Jones, and Brian Cox. It was released in the United States on March 29, 2002 by Buena Vista Pictures Distribution. The film received positive reviews from critics and grossed $80.7 million against a $22 million budget.

== Plot ==
Jim Morris is the son of a career Navy man who moves the family from Hollywood, Florida, to Big Lake, Texas. Jim is a skilled pitcher, though his father disapproves of his dream of making it to Major League Baseball. The town to which Jim's family moved, Big Lake, has lost its love for baseball, preferring football. Thus, he is unable to play baseball in high school. He later gets a chance when he is drafted by the Milwaukee Brewers, but he tears up his shoulder, ending his lifelong dream.

In 1999, Jim, married with three children, is a high school science teacher and head baseball coach. His team, the Big Lake Owls, is unsuccessful, with many of his players being skilled but unmotivated. One day after practice, the team catcher offers to play catch with Jim. There, it is revealed that Jim may still have his fastball. The Owls believe that Jim could possibly pitch in the major leagues and offer him a deal: if the Owls win district and make the state playoffs, Jim will try out again. He accepts their offer, and the team urges him to throw his fastball in batting practice; this immensely improves their batting skills.

The Owls win district. Jim is told of a tryout nearby for the Tampa Bay Devil Rays and decides to attend without telling his wife Lorri, afraid that her fear of him re-injuring his shoulder will keep him from going. The professional scouts discover his ability to throw a baseball at 98 mph (158 km/h). The lead scout tells Jim he could be signed to a minor-league deal. Lorri finds out after getting two phone messages from the Tampa Bay scouts. Jim tells his father - with whom he still has a cold relationship - who again tries to dissuade him. Lorri is also reluctant to let Jim go, citing his home responsibilities, but after seeing how Jim is inspiring their son, Hunter, she allows him to go.

Jim is initially assigned to the minor league Class AA Orlando Rays but quickly moves up to the Class AAA Durham Bulls. Concerned for his family due to mounting bills, he decides to give up, but Lorri talks him out of it. Jim gets inspired again when he views his own interview on television and watches a Little League Baseball game, remembering the love for baseball he had as a kid.

In September, Jim is told that the Major League club has called him up and they will be playing in Texas against the Rangers. He calls his wife, who informs the town. Having told her of the dress code for players, Jim finds his sports coat, a necktie, and his St. Rita (the saint of impossible dreams) medal hanging in his locker when he arrives. His family, high school players, and many townspeople go to the game. Jim impresses many of the coaches in warm-ups with his fastball, and late in the game, with Tampa Bay losing badly, Jim is called in to pitch to Royce Clayton and end the inning. Jim gets a strikeout against Clayton on three straight fastballs. After the game, he gets interviewed by the press and notices that his father has come to the game. Jim's father admits how special it is to see his son play in the majors and apologizes for not supporting Jim before. Jim thanks him and gives him the ball with which he got the strikeout, and the two repair their relationship.

The Big Lake High School trophy case displays Jim's major league jersey. It is then mentioned that Jim pitched in the major leagues for two seasons before retiring and returning to teaching in Texas.

== Cast ==
- Dennis Quaid as Jim Morris
  - Trevor Morgan as young Jimmy
- Rachel Griffiths as Lorri Morris
- Jay Hernandez as Joaquin 'Wack' Campos
- Beth Grant as Olline
- Angus T. Jones as Hunter Morris
- Brian Cox as Jim Morris Sr.
- Rick Gonzalez as Rudy Bonilla (Owls pitcher)
- Chad Lindberg as Joe David Werst
- Angelo Spizzirri as Joel De La Garza (Owls catcher)
- Royce D. Applegate as Henry
- Russell Richardson as Brooks
- Raynor Scheine as Frank
- Matt Williams as Owls Player #1
- David Blackwell as Cal
- Chris Sheffield as Snow Covered Catcher
- Blue Deckert as Baseball Scout Dave Patterson
- Danny Kamin as Durham Manager Mac (as Daniel Kamin)
- Mike Smith as Fan
- Kyle Christensen as Baseball Player
- Robbie Bigelow as Beefcake Bigelow
- Jim Morris as Orlando Umpire #2

== Production ==
Filming took place from March 26, 2001, to June 11, 2001. The film was filmed in Texas. The film was filmed in 2.40:1 widescreen.

Apart from scenes filmed at The Ballpark in Arlington, locations included the following:

- The city of Thorndale, Texas, was used predominantly in the opening half of the film as the small town of Big Lake. Thorndale High School's interior and exterior parts of the building and baseball field were used for Big Lake High School's campus. Thorndale's Main Street and the downtown area were also used extensively in the film.
- Neighboring Thrall High School in Thrall, Texas, was dressed for several differing scenes, including scenes of several different "away" baseball games filmed on the school's field. Thrall's then-recently completed football stadium stood in as Big Lake's. Thrall's old football field, dressing rooms, and recreation pavilion were dressed as an oil refinery's outlay in a deleted scene viewable on the DVD's special features.
- A scene shot in front of a motel supposedly in Florida was actually filmed in front of what is now a Best Western in Taylor, Texas.

Most of the population portrayed in this movie of Big Lake, Texas were fictional. Only the baseball team and those directly connected were based on real people.

The Bulls game was shot in Round Rock, Texas at the Dell Diamond.

The tryout scenes were filmed at Taylor High School in Taylor, Texas, and Angelo State University (San Angelo, TX).

The Orlando Rays game was shot at Austin ISD's Nelson Field.

The oilfield scene was shot on the Heep Ranch south of Austin.

== Reception ==
Review aggregation site Rotten Tomatoes reports an approval rating of 84% based on 154 reviews, with an average rating of 7.2/10. The critics consensus reads, "A heart-warming sports flick, The Rookie greatly benefits from understated direction and the emotional honesty Dennis Quaid brings to the role of Jim Morris." On Metacritic, the film has a weighted average score 72 out of 100 based on 31 critics, indicating "generally favorable reviews". Audiences polled by CinemaScore gave the film an average grade of "A" on an A+ to F scale. The film was filmed in 2.40:1 widescreen. The film was released on VHS and DVD on August 27, 2002. The film was filmed in 2.40:1 widescreen where approximately half of the units show the film in its original 2.40:1 aspect ratio and while the other half presents the film in a 1.33:1 pan and scan format.

=== Accolades ===
- AFI's 100 Years...100 Cheers - Nominated

== Portrayal of Morris marriage ==
The film omitted the fact that Jim and Lorri Morris, whose marriage was a focal point of the film's plot, were separated by the time his MLB career ended. They were in fact undergoing the process of divorce by the time Jim was undergoing spring training for the Los Angeles Dodgers in 2001. Jim Morris would also remarry in 2002.

== See also ==
- List of baseball films
