= Petty House (San Antonio) =

Coordinates: 29°26′08″N 98°28′56″W

Petty House is a historic Victorian house located at 10 10th Street, San Antonio, Texas along the San Antonio River Walk.

== History ==
Mary Drake built the house in 1895 in an area known as Milam Bend. After moving to the area, businessman Van Alvin Petty Sr. (1860–1929) and his wife Mary Cordelia née Dabney (1861–1943) purchased the house in November 1901. The Veterans of Foreign Wars Post 76, the largest and oldest VFW post in Texas, purchased the house in 1947 and has been located there ever since.

The City of San Antonio designated it a historic landmark in 2008, followed by the State of Texas in 2017.
