= Jim Morris =

American baseball player (born 1964)

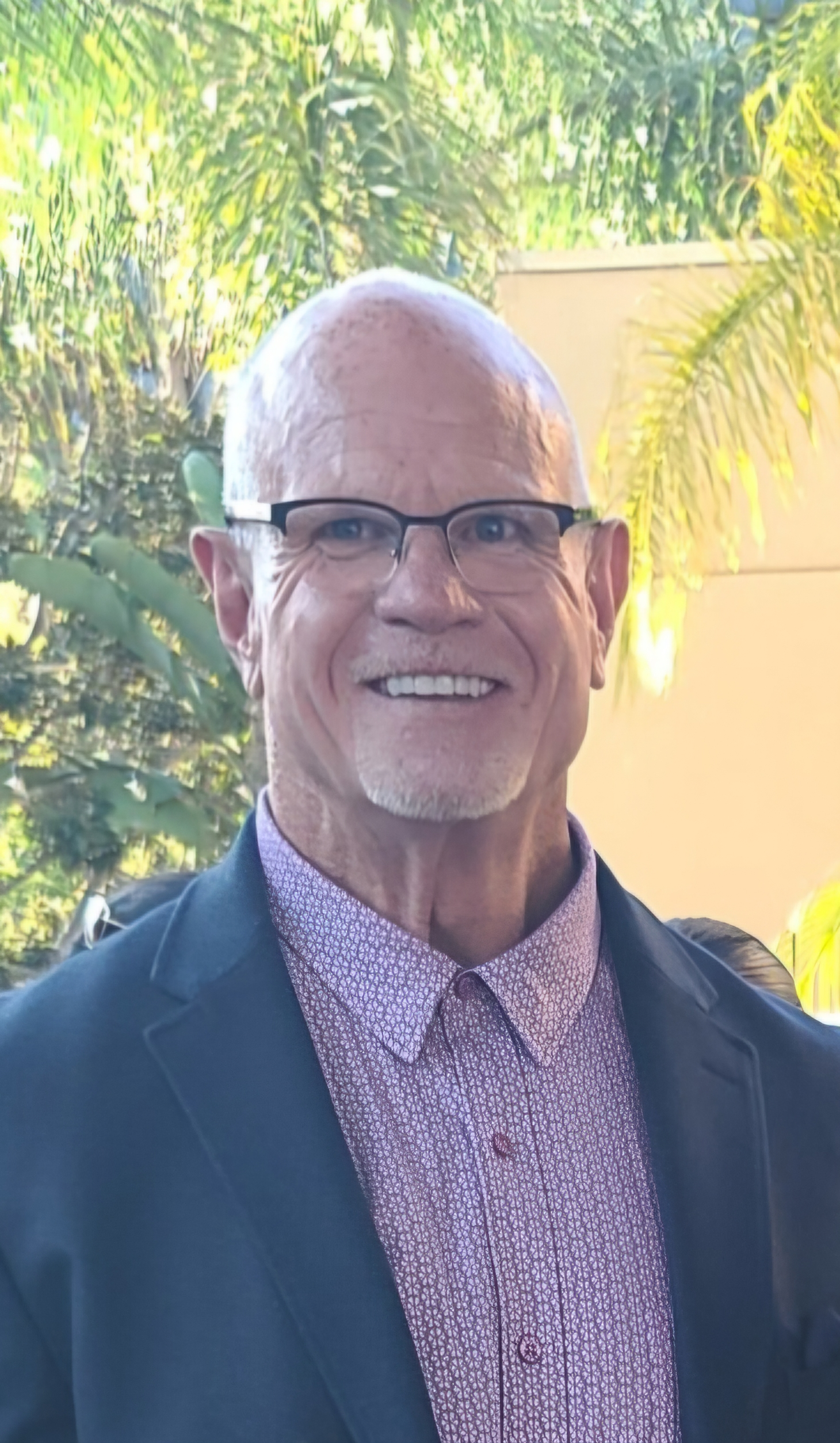
- Morris in 2023
- Pitcher
- Born: January 19, 1964 (age 62); Brownwood, Texas, U.S.
- Batted: Left Threw: Left

MLB debut
- September 18, 1999, for the Tampa Bay Devil Rays

Last MLB appearance
- May 9, 2000, for the Tampa Bay Devil Rays

MLB statistics
- Win–loss record: 0–0
- Earned run average: 4.80
- Strikeouts: 13
- Stats at Baseball Reference

Teams
- Tampa Bay Devil Rays (1999–2000)

James Samuel Morris Jr. (born January 19, 1964) is an American former professional baseball pitcher who played in Major League Baseball (MLB) for two seasons with the Tampa Bay Devil Rays. Although brief, Morris' career is noted for making his MLB debut at the age of 35 and after undergoing several arm surgeries. His story was dramatized in the 2002 film The Rookie.

== Early life ==
Morris was born in Brownwood, Texas, but spent most of his childhood moving to different cities, as his father was in the United States Navy. Throughout his childhood, Morris lived in New Haven, Connecticut, Great Lakes, Illinois, and Jacksonville, Florida. He began playing baseball at the age of three. His father, Jim Sr., became a recruiter for the Navy. His father and mother, Olline Hale, settled in Brownwood, Texas. He attended Brownwood High School, but as Brownwood did not yet have a baseball program he instead played football for the Lions from 1979 to 1982 and in his junior season, won the 1981 state championship over Abilene Cooper High School playing the positions of wingback, punter and kicker with Gordon Wood as his head coach.

== College career ==
Morris attended Howard Payne University in Brownwood, Texas, Angelo State University in San Angelo, Texas, Paris Junior College in Paris, Texas, and Ranger College in Ranger, Texas.

Angelo State did not sponsor a college baseball team during Morris's time there, so he instead competed for the Rams football team as a punter for the 1991 and 1992 seasons. In his second and final year on the team, the 28-year-old lefty (who was listed as a sophomore) led all of NCAA Division II with an average of 44.5 yards per punt. The performance earned him a spot on the AFCA/Kodak All-America team.

Morris graduated the following summer with a degree in kinesiology and psychology and hung up his football cleats as he entered graduate school and took a full-time job as the director of the ASU Men's High Rise dormitory.

His career punting average for the Rams was 42.8 yards, just short of the standing ASU record of 43.2 yards by Bill Dement (1968–1971).

== Professional baseball career ==
=== Draft and minor leagues ===
Morris was originally selected 466th overall in the January 1982 amateur baseball draft by the New York Yankees out of high school but did not sign. He was selected out of Ranger College fourth overall in the 1983 amateur draft (January Secondary) by the Milwaukee Brewers and signed with the organization. Morris suffered several arm injuries in the minor leagues, missing all of the 1986 season. After four pitching appearances in 1987, he was released, never having progressed past the Single-A level.

After sitting out all of 1988, Morris signed with the Chicago White Sox organization for 1989. Arm injuries and ineffectiveness limited him to pitching in just two games and he was again unable to rise past the Single-A level before being released.

Unable to make anything of his career, Morris retired and moved to Big Lake, Texas with his wife Lorri, his nine-year-old son, and his five- and one-year-old daughters, where he became a physical science teacher and baseball coach at Reagan County High School. At this point, Morris had retired with a minor league record of 17–22, and a 5.13 earned run average (ERA) in 270 innings pitched.

Morris remained a teacher for Reagan County High School for the next decade. While coaching baseball for the Reagan County Owls in the spring of 1999, Morris made a promise to his team that he would try out for an MLB team if his team won the District Championship, something the team had never accomplished before. His team won the title and Morris kept his end of the bargain by attending a Tampa Bay Devil Rays tryout. The scout was not interested in Morris, seeing him as too old and washed up, but reluctantly gave him a tryout solely to let Morris keep his promise to his players. Surprisingly, Morris discovered that in spite of his age, and having several surgeries on his arm, he was able to throw 12 consecutive 98-mph fastballs. After much debate with his family, Morris signed a professional contract with the Devil Rays organization at the age of 35. He started out with the Double-A Orlando Rays and moved up quickly to a spot with the Triple-A Durham Bulls.

=== Tampa Bay Devil Rays (1999–2000) ===
Thanks to solid pitching performances with Durham, Tampa Bay gave him a chance to pitch with the Rays when rosters expanded in September. On September 18, 1999, against Royce Clayton of the Texas Rangers, the 35-year-old Morris made his debut, striking Clayton out on four pitches. He made four more appearances later that year.

Morris made 16 major league appearances in 2000, during which his arm problems recurred. His final appearance came on May 9, 2000, at Yankee Stadium, home of the team that had first drafted him 17 years earlier. He entered a tie game in the bottom of the 10th inning with the bases loaded, and issued a game-ending RBI walk to his first batter, Paul O'Neill, after which the Rays shut him down for the season: the club ultimately released Morris in November. He was not the losing pitcher in the game as the runner who scored on the walk had been put on base by the previous pitcher Rick White, who was tagged with the loss. Morris never recorded any wins or losses in any of his major league appearances.

Morris was signed in December 2000 to a minor-league contract by the Los Angeles Dodgers, but was released during 2001 spring training. At the end of his major league career he was 0–0 with an ERA of 4.80 and 13 strikeouts in 15 innings pitched.

Morris released an autobiography, The Oldest Rookie. He often appears as a motivational speaker. Morris released his second book, Dream Makers, in 2020. It deals with his life in the twenty years since his retirement from Major League Baseball.

A feature film made by Disney called The Rookie was released in 2002 about Morris's climb to playing in MLB. He is portrayed in the film by Dennis Quaid. Morris cameos in the movie as "Orlando Umpire #2".

== Personal life ==
Morris was married to Lorri Morris from 1987 until their divorce in 2002, and they have three children - Hunter, Jessica, and Jaimee. They separated by the time he underwent spring training for the Los Angeles Dodgers in 2001. He married Shawna Morris in 2002, and they have one daughter, Chelsey.
