= Thrall Independent School District =

School district in Texas

Address
- 201 South Bounds Street Thrall, Texas, 76578; United States

District information
- Grades: PK–12
- Schools: 3
- NCES District ID: 4842660

Students and staff
- Students: 852 (2023–2024)
- Teachers: 65.01 (on an FTE basis)
- Student–teacher ratio: 13.11:1

Other information
- Website: www.thrallisd.org

Thrall Independent School District is a public school district based in Thrall, Texas (USA) and covers eastern Williamson County. Thrall ISD serves approximately 810 students in grades PK-12th Grade.

== Schools ==
The district has three campuses -

- Thrall High School (Grades 9-12).
- Thrall Middle School (Grades 5-8).
- Thrall Elementary School (Grades PK-4).

In 2022, Thrall ISD is rated as an "A" Rated district by the Texas Education Agency.
