= Sheryl Sculley =

Former city manager for San Antonio, Texas (born 1952)

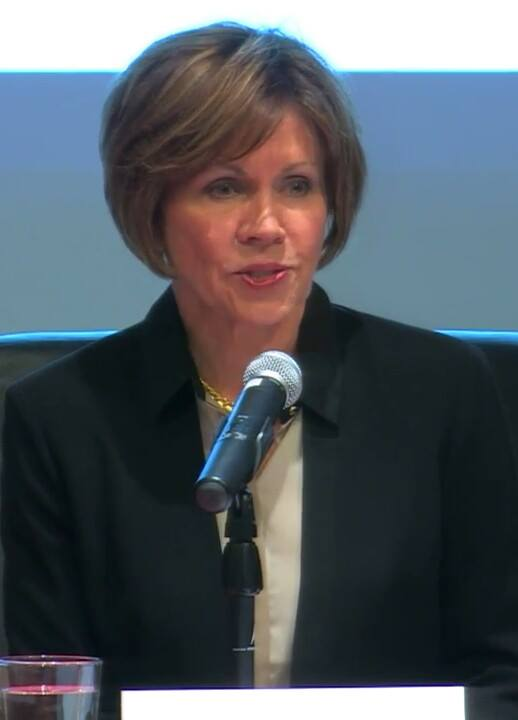

City Manager of San Antonio, Texas
- In office November 7, 2005 – March 1, 2019
- Succeeded by: Erik Walsh

Personal details
- Born: May 1, 1952 (age 74) Indiana
- Spouse: Michael James Sculley
- Children: 2
- Education: Ball State University, B.S. Western Michigan University, MPA

Sheryl Lee Sculley (born May 1, 1952) is an American politician and the former city manager of San Antonio, Texas, a position which she filled from November 2005 until March 2019. Her unusually long tenure was highly controversial because of her lucrative compensation, doubling from $250,000 in 2005 to upwards of $500,000 as of 2015.

== Background ==
Sheryl Sculley was born in Indiana and reared in Chicago, Illinois. Her father was a Democratic precinct committeeman in northwestern Indiana. His involvement in politics and her participation in Girls State helped cultivate her early interest in local government.

Sculley obtained a Bachelor of Science degree in Political Science and Journalism from Ball State University in Muncie, Indiana. She attended BSU on a journalism scholarship and later earned a Master of Public Administration degree from Western Michigan University in Kalamazoo, Michigan. She also completed executive programs for both local and state government from the John F. Kennedy School of Government at Harvard University in Cambridge, Massachusetts.

== Career ==
Sculley's first interest was as political journalist. Her first job out of college was with the city of Kalamazoo. She was elevated to city manager there and served in that position for fifteen years. Sculley moved to Phoenix, Arizona, where for sixteen years she was the assistant city manager. Sculley then moved to San Antonio as the city manager.

Among her achievements in San Antonio, Sculley pushed for the $325 million expenditure in 2016 to renovate the downtown Henry B. González Convention Center. She worked to increase the number of conventions coming into the city. She worked in 2016 for the designation of San Antonio Missions National Historical Park as a World Heritage Site. She further backed the expansion of the San Antonio River Walk from three miles to more than fifteen. In 2015, at the annual gathering of the San Antonio Convention & Visitors Bureau, Sculley was honored with the Robert H. H. Hugman Award for her contributions to the city. Sculley pushed strongly to promote expanded tourism in her city. She worked in 2016 to make the Convention & Visitors Bureau into a public-private nonprofit organization renamed Visit San Antonio.

After her retirement as city manager, Sculley moved to Austin, Texas to teach advanced public management at the University of Texas at Austin's Lyndon B. Johnson School of Public Affairs.

== Personal life ==
Sculley and her husband, Michael James Sculley, have two children. Michael Sculley was appointed by the Bexar County Commissioners Court as director of the Community Venues Program Office.

== Bibliography ==
- Greedy Bastards: One City's Texas-Size Struggle to Avoid a Financial Crisis (Lioncrest Publishing, 2020)
