= Diversion dam =

Dam that diverts some flow of a river

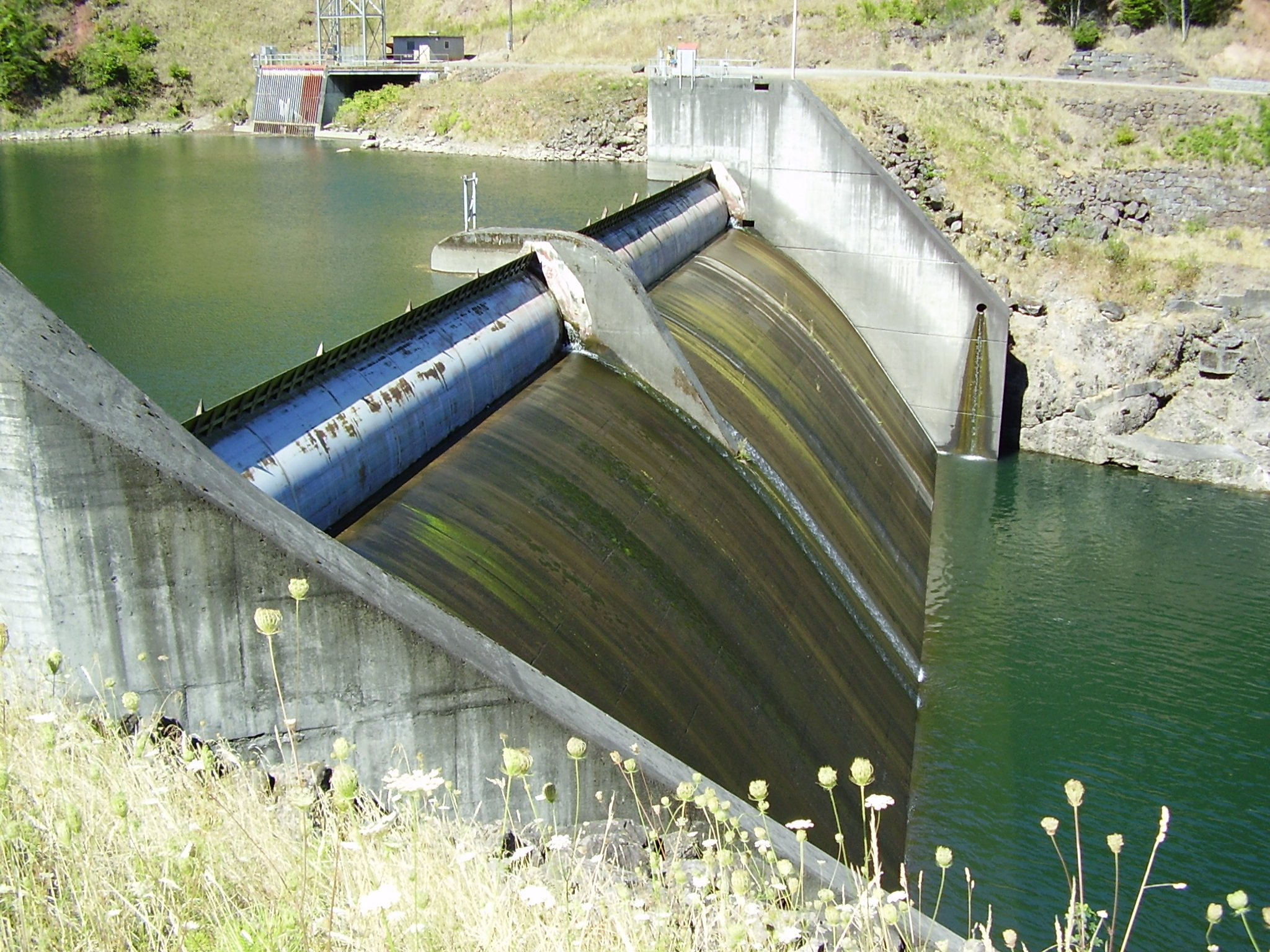
The Faraday Diversion Dam, Clackamas River. This dam slows a normally fast and shallow river for partial diversion to a hydroelectric dam. The diversion tunnel opening can be seen in the upper left.

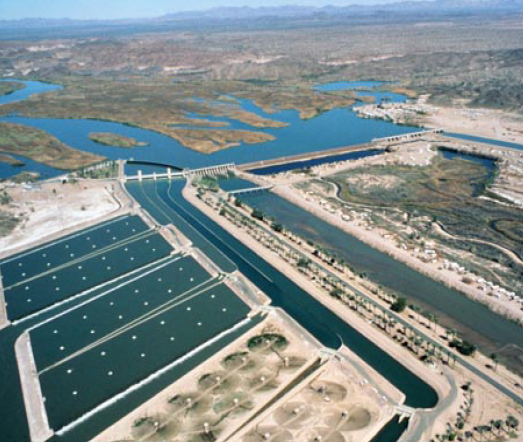
The Imperial Dam diverting the Colorado River in the southwestern United States.

A diversion dam is a dam that diverts all or a portion of the flow of a river from its natural course. Diversion dams do not generally impound water in a reservoir; instead, the water is diverted into an artificial water course or canal, which may be used for irrigation or return to the river after passing through hydroelectric generators, flow into a different river or be itself dammed forming an on-ground or groundwater reservoir or a storm drain.

An early diversion dam is the Ancient Egyptian Sadd el-Kafara Dam at Wadi Al-Garawi, which was located about twenty five kilometres south of Cairo. Built around 2600 BC for flood control, the structure was 102 metres long at its base and 87 metres wide. It was destroyed by a flood while it was still under construction.

== Classification ==
Diversion dams are a classification of dams distinct from storage and detention dams. Storage dams are used to store water for extended lengths of time. The stored water then can be used for irrigation, livestock, municipal water supply, recreation, and hydroelectric power generation. Detention dams are built to catch surface runoff to prevent floods and trap sediment by regulating the flow rate of the runoff into channels downstream. Diversion dams are used to raise the water level in order to redirect the water to the designated location. The diverted water can be used for supplying irrigation systems or reservoirs.

== Purpose ==
Diversion dams are installed to raise the water level of a body of water to allow the water to be redirected. The redirected water can be used to supply irrigation systems, reservoirs, or hydroelectric power generation facilities. The water diverted by the diversion dam to the reservoirs can be used for industrial applications or for municipal water supply.

== Construction ==
The design a diversion dam will fall into one of four basic types: embankment style dams, buttress style dams, arch style dams, and gravity style dams.

=== Embankment style diversion dam ===
Embankment style diversion dams are constructed to counteract the force of the water pushing on the dam by building a dam with enough weight to withstand the force. Embankment dams are commonly made from materials in the surrounding area where the dam is being built. The materials generally include: sand, gravel, and rocks. The combination of these building materials with either clay or an impervious membrane gives the embankment dam its integrity. As a result, the combination of its simple construction and locally available building materials the cost of building an embankment dam is lower than the other types of dams.

=== Buttress style diversion dam ===
Buttress style diversion dams are designed using angle supports on the downstream side of the dam. The supports are fixed to the wall of the dam in order to help counteract the force of the water on the dam. Buttress style dams are built across wide valleys that do not have a solid bedrock foundation. Bedrock is solid rock that makes up the upper part of the Earth's crust. Bedrock can be made from sedimentary, igneous, and metaphoric rock origins. Buttress dams require extensive steel framework and labor. As a result, buttress style dams are expensive to construct and are seldom built today.

=== Arch style diversion dam ===
Arch style diversion dams are designed using an arch shape with the top of the arch facing upstream. The arch shape provides extra strength to counteract the force of the water. Arch style dams are generally constructed in narrow canyons. Arch style dams are commonly made from concrete. To ensure the dam's integrity, a solid contact between the bedrock foundation and the dam's concrete base is required. The dome style dam is a type of arch dam. The dome style dam curves in both the horizontal plane and vertical plane. The arch style dam only curves in the horizontal.

=== Gravity style diversion dam ===
Gravity style diversion dams are built to counteract the force of the water pushing on the dam by building a dam with enough weight to withstand the force. Gravity dams are commonly constructed using masonry or cement. The foundations of the gravity dams are generally constructed on top of a solid bedrock foundation. However, gravity dams can be built over unconsolidated ground as long as proper measures are put in place to stop the flow of water under the dam. If water were to get under the dam, the dam could fail.

== See also ==
- Spillway
- Canal
- Flood control
- Floodgate
- Levee
- Reservoir
- River
- Stream
- Sluice
- Storm drain
- Storm surge
- River bifurcation
