= Erik Walsh =

City Manager of San Antonio, Texas

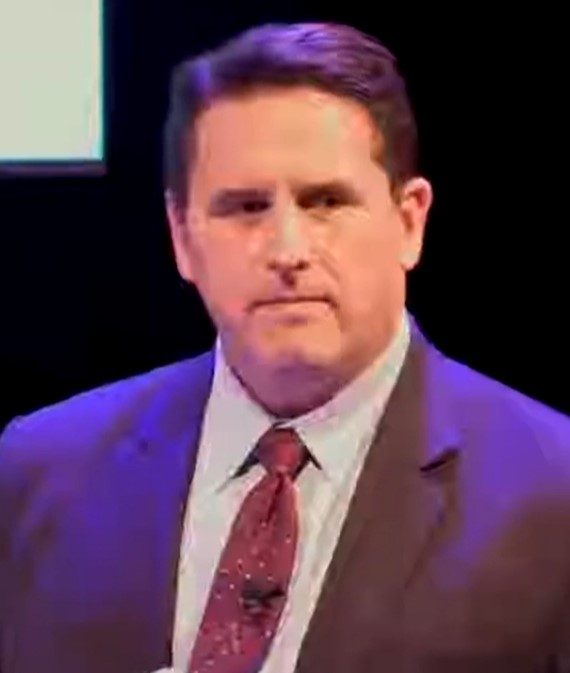

City Manager of San Antonio, Texas
- Incumbent
- Assumed office March 1, 2019
- Preceded by: Sheryl Sculley

Personal details
- Born: February 7, 1969 (age 56) San Antonio, Texas, U.S.
- Spouse: Sandra Kiolbassa (m. 2003)
- Children: 2
- Education: Trinity University (BA, MS)

Erik Walsh (born February 7, 1969) is the city manager of San Antonio, Texas. He has served in the position since March 2019.

== Early life and education ==
Erik James Walsh was born on February 7, 1969, in San Antonio, Texas, the son of John Brendan Walsh and Irene Ramirez. His mother was a native of the city and of Mexican-American heritage, while his father was an immigrant from Ireland. Walsh graduated from Central Catholic High School in 1987. He attended Trinity University, where he played for the football team and competed on the track & field teams. He graduated in 1991 with a BA in political science with a minor in history. Walsh received an MS degree in urban administration from the university in 1994.

== Career ==
Walsh worked for the city office of management & budget starting in 1994. He served as deputy city manager immediately preceding his assumption of the office of city manager on March 1, 2019. Walsh was selected as city manager from a field of more than 30 candidates, including his superior Sheryl Sculley who had held the job for 13 years. Sculley lost due to disagreements she had with the firemen's union, the San Antonio Professional Firefighters Association. The union had supported the passage of two city charter amendments in 2018: one amendment limits the city manager tenure to eight years, while the other caps the city manager compensation to no more than 10 times that of the lowest-paid full-time employees of the city, which as of 2019 placed his annual salary cap at $312,000.

== Personal life ==
Walsh married Sandra Kiolbassa in 2003. Together they have two children.
