= Texas Flood (disambiguation) =

Texas Flood may refer to:

- Texas Flood, an album by the American blues rock band Stevie Ray Vaughan and Double Trouble
  - "Texas Flood" (song), a blues standard by Larry Davis which serves as the album's title track
  - Texas Flood Tour, a concert tour undertaken by the band following the album release
- Texas Flood (band), a Serbian blues rock band

== See also ==
- Texas flooding (disambiguation)
