= Marriage Island =

Coordinates: 29°25′22″N 98°29′24″W

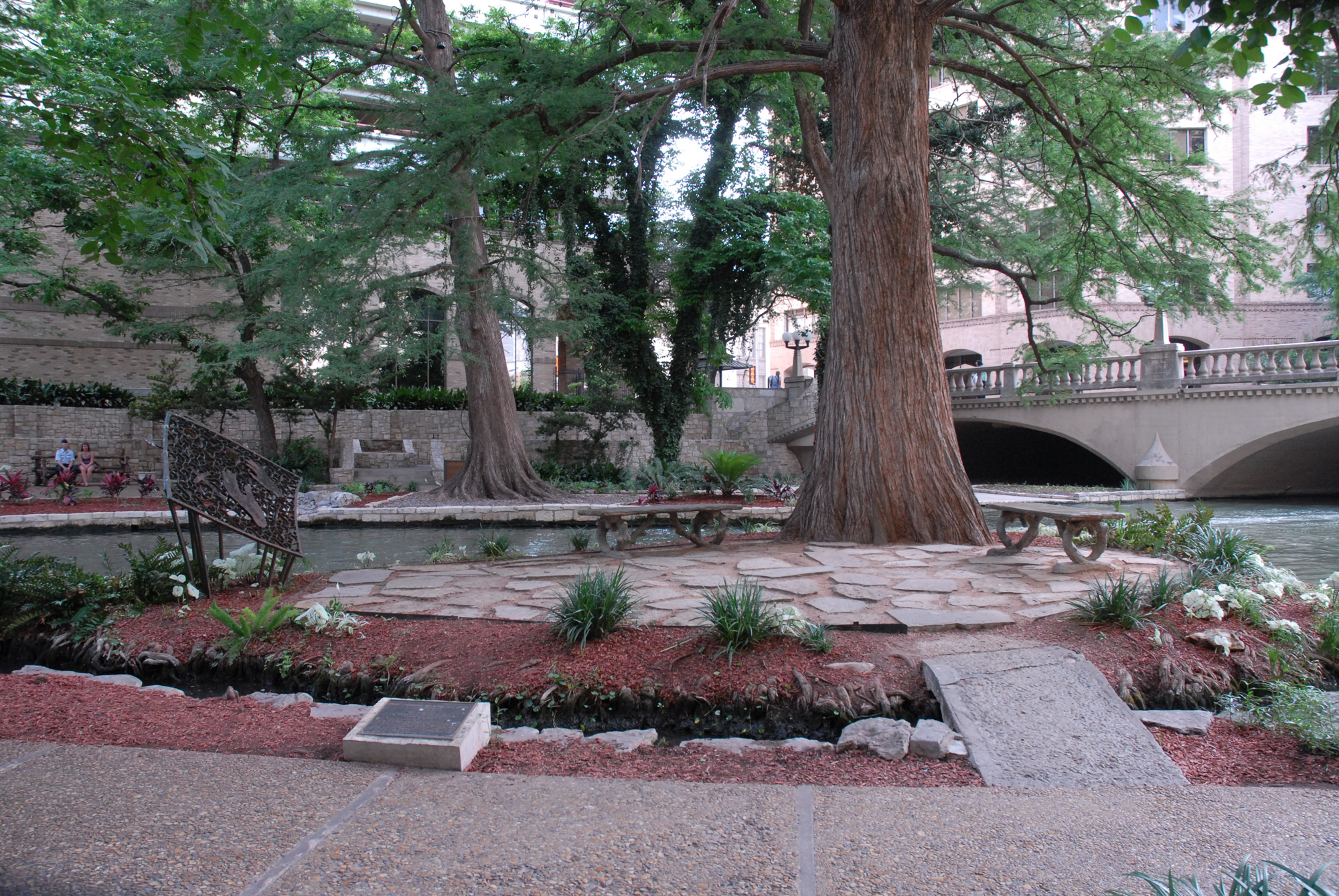
View of Marriage Island

Marriage Island in Downtown San Antonio, Texas, is an islet in the middle of the San Antonio River on the San Antonio River Walk that is used for weddings. River guides claim that it brings good luck to new marriages and that it is heart-shaped. It is located in front of the Hotel Contessa on the widest part of the river, and is host to about 225 weddings a year. The island is located between the Navarro Street Bridge and Presa Street Bridge along the River Walk. San Antonio River tourist barges pass by the island on every tour along the river. Over the years, it has come to be known as Marriage Island due to the many wedding ceremonies performed there.

== History ==
The Spanish Missionary, Father Damián Massanet, conducted San Antonio's first Catholic Mass on the island on June 13, 1691. He went on to rename the river after Saint Anthony of Padua to honor his feast day. Rolando Briseño was commissioned in 1991 to create a sculpture to commemorate this Mass. The island is now the root ball of a cypress tree that was planted over 100 years ago. The island was originally kept so as not to cause permanent damage to the historic tree. It belongs to the City of San Antonio and the use of the island is controlled by Downtown Operations.
