= Thrall High School =

Location
- 201 South Bounds Street; Thrall, Texas 76578-0398; United States; 30°35′19″N 97°17′37″W

Information
- School type: Public high school
- School district: Thrall Independent School District
- Principal: Travis Dube
- Teaching staff: 24.00 (FTE)
- Grades: 9-12
- Enrollment: 293 (2025-2026)
- Student to teacher ratio: 11.42
- Colors: Purple & White
- Athletics conference: UIL Class 3A
- Nickname: Tigers/Tigerettes
- Website: www.thrallisd.org

Thrall High School is a public secondary school located in Thrall, Texas. It is part of the Thrall Independent School District located in eastern Williamson County, and classified as a 3A school by the University Interscholastic League as of 2026. In 2015, the school was rated "met standard" by the Texas Education Agency.

== History ==
The town was called "Stiles Switch" in 1876, named after a local rancher and the arrival of the International-Great Northern Railroad. Stiles School opened in the 1880's. In 1901 the post office and the community were named after Homer S. Thrall, a local minister and historian who had written histories of Texas, including Thrall's School History of Texas. In 1908, Stiles School was moved and renamed Thrall School.

The Thrall High School building was constructed in 1938, and it opened in September that year. Just over thirty years later it was destroyed by a fire which had been intentionally set, on January 19, 1969. Students resumed classes on January 20, "in the hastily renovated old high school building and the old auditorium". In March, voters approved a $100,000 school bond to rebuild the school.

In 1997, voters passed a $2.73 million bond issue for improvements to the kindergarten through 12th-grade campus, including a primary school wing, as well as "an athletic complex, a cafeteria and a band hall" and conversion of the existing band hall and cafeteria to classrooms for secondary grades. Distance runners had been training on city streets, and the field house dressing rooms had been too small for the school's population of about 500 students. School superintendent Tom Bowman said that "the athletic complex would include an eight-lane track, a football field, bleachers, a concession stand and a field house". The new track was the first in the district. That same year, the school received a $51,289 state grant to reduce bond indebtedness.

By 2005, refinancing bond indebtedness needed the voters' consideration of $1.7 million in bonds, to pay off "short-term debt" of past construction costs, as well as some upgrades. The first bond for $715,000 to refinance existing bond debt passed, and voters also approved the second, "$340,000 in bonds to install new lighting in the schools, upgrade air-conditioning units on campuses, build a sidewalk and make other upgrades, including resurfacing tennis courts and replacing a gymnasium floor". A third proposed bond for an agricultural building, to house pens for animals that students raised, did not pass.

== Film settings ==
- The Rookie includes some clips filmed at Thrall High School in March 2001.
- A scene in the 2012 independent film Abel's Field starring Kevin Sorbo was filmed on the campus.

== Demographics ==
The demographic breakdown of the 194 students enrolled in 2012-2013 was:

- Male - 49.0%
- Female - 51.0%
- Native American/Alaskan - 0.5%
- Black - 2.6%
- Hispanic - 23.2%
- White - 71.1%
- Multiracial - 2.6%

About 35.6% of the students were eligible for free or reduced-price lunch.

== Athletics ==
Thrall High School's mascot is the Tigers. They compete in cross country, volleyball, football, basketball, powerlifting, golf, track, tennis, baseball, and softball.

Thrall High School has a rivalry with nearby Thorndale High School. They have competed against each other in football since 1925.

=== State titles ===
- Baseball: 1998 (1A)

=== State finalists ===
- Volleyball: 2021 (2A)
