= San Antonio River Walk =

City park and pedestrian street in Texas, United States

Coordinates: 29.425205°N 98.491575°W

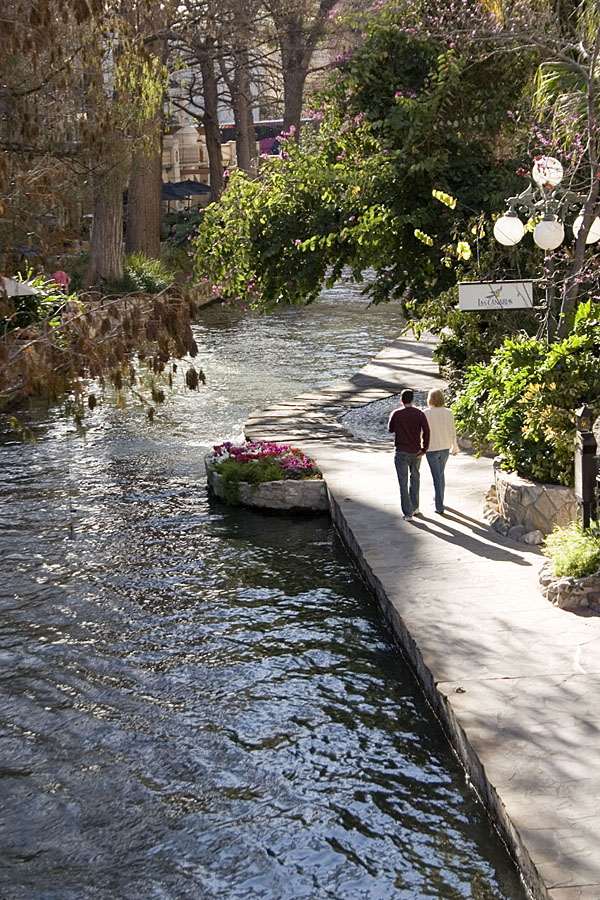
A couple strolls along the Riverwalk by Las Canarias restaurant, at the Omni La Mansion Hotel.

The San Antonio River Walk is a city park and special-case pedestrian street along the San Antonio River in San Antonio, Texas. Situated one level down from the automobile street, the River Walk winds and loops under bridges as two parallel sidewalks lined with restaurants and shops, connecting the major tourist draws such as the Shops at Rivercenter, the Arneson River Theater, Marriage Island, La Villita, HemisFair Park, Petty House, the Tower Life Building, the San Antonio Museum of Art, the Pearl, and the city's five Spanish colonial missions, each have been named a World Heritage Site, which includes the Alamo. During the annual springtime Fiesta San Antonio, the River Parade features flowery floats that float down the river.

The area within the circumference of the River Walk is the heart of the original 1700s Villa de Bejar outpost, which would eventually become the City of San Antonio.

== History ==
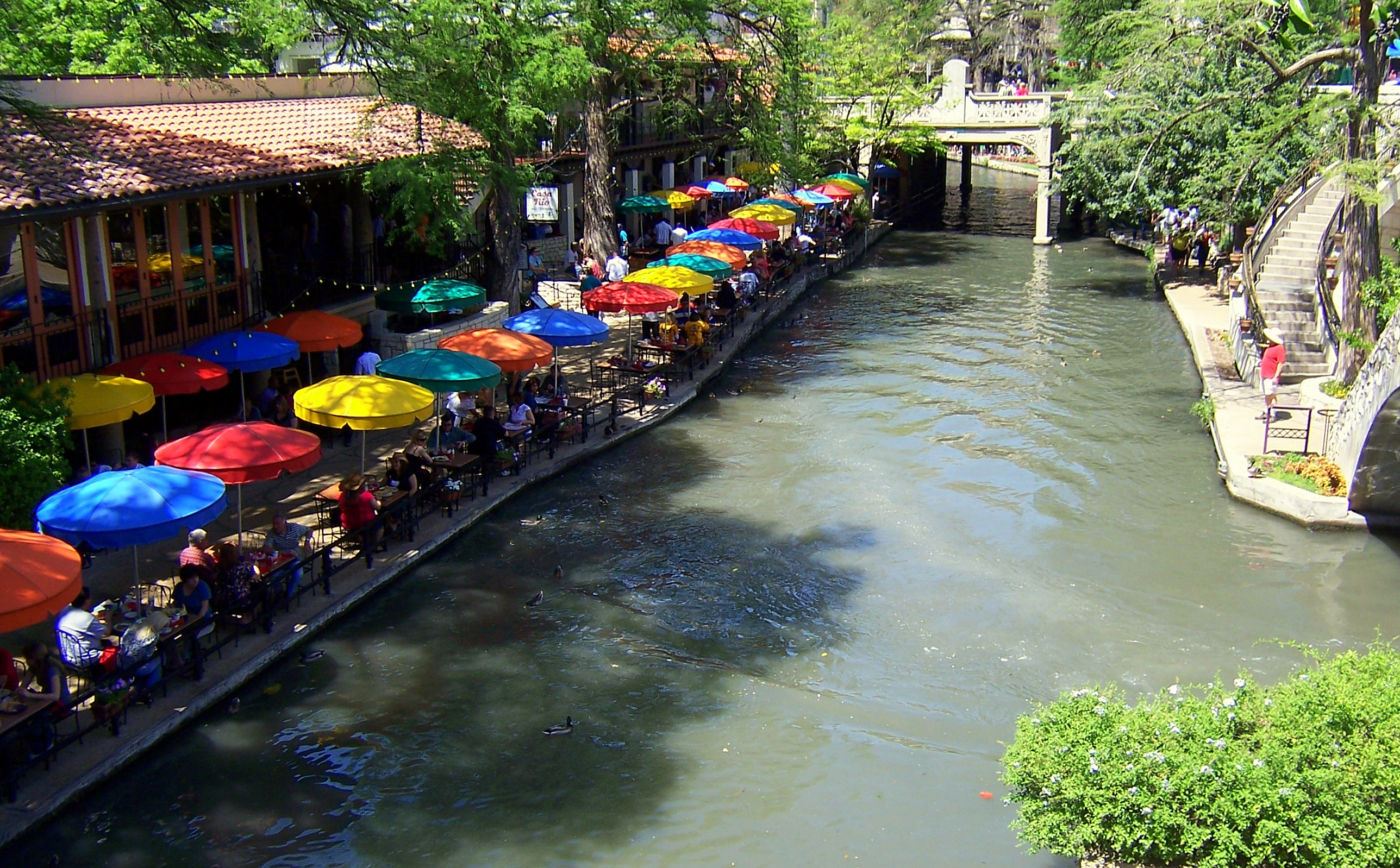
Looking down at the river at Market and Alamo streets. The colorful umbrellas mark Casa Rio, the first restaurant built on the water in 1946.

In September 1921, a disastrous flood along the San Antonio River took 51 lives, with an additional 23 people reported missing. Plans were then developed for flood control of the river. Among the plans was to build an upstream dam (Olmos Dam) and bypass a prominent bend of the river in the Downtown area (between present-day Houston Street and Villita Parkway), then to pave over the bend, and create a storm sewer.

Work began on the Olmos Dam and bypass channel in 1926; however, the San Antonio Conservation Society successfully protested the paved sewer option. No major plans came into play until 1929, when San Antonio native and architect Robert Hugman submitted his plans for what would become the River Walk. Although many have been involved in development of the site, the leadership of former mayor Jack White was instrumental in passage of a bond issue that raised funds to empower the 1938 "San Antonio River Beautification Project", which began the evolution of the site into the present 2.5-mile-long (4.0-kilometer) River Walk.

Hugman endorsed the bypass channel idea (which would be completed later that year) but, instead of paving over the bend, Hugman suggested 1) a flood gate at the northern (upstream) end of the bend; 2) a small dam at the southern (downstream) end of the bend; and 3) a Tainter gate in the channel to regulate flow. The bend would then be surrounded by commercial development, which he titled "The Shops of Aragon and Romula". Hugman went as far as to maintain his architect's office along the bend.

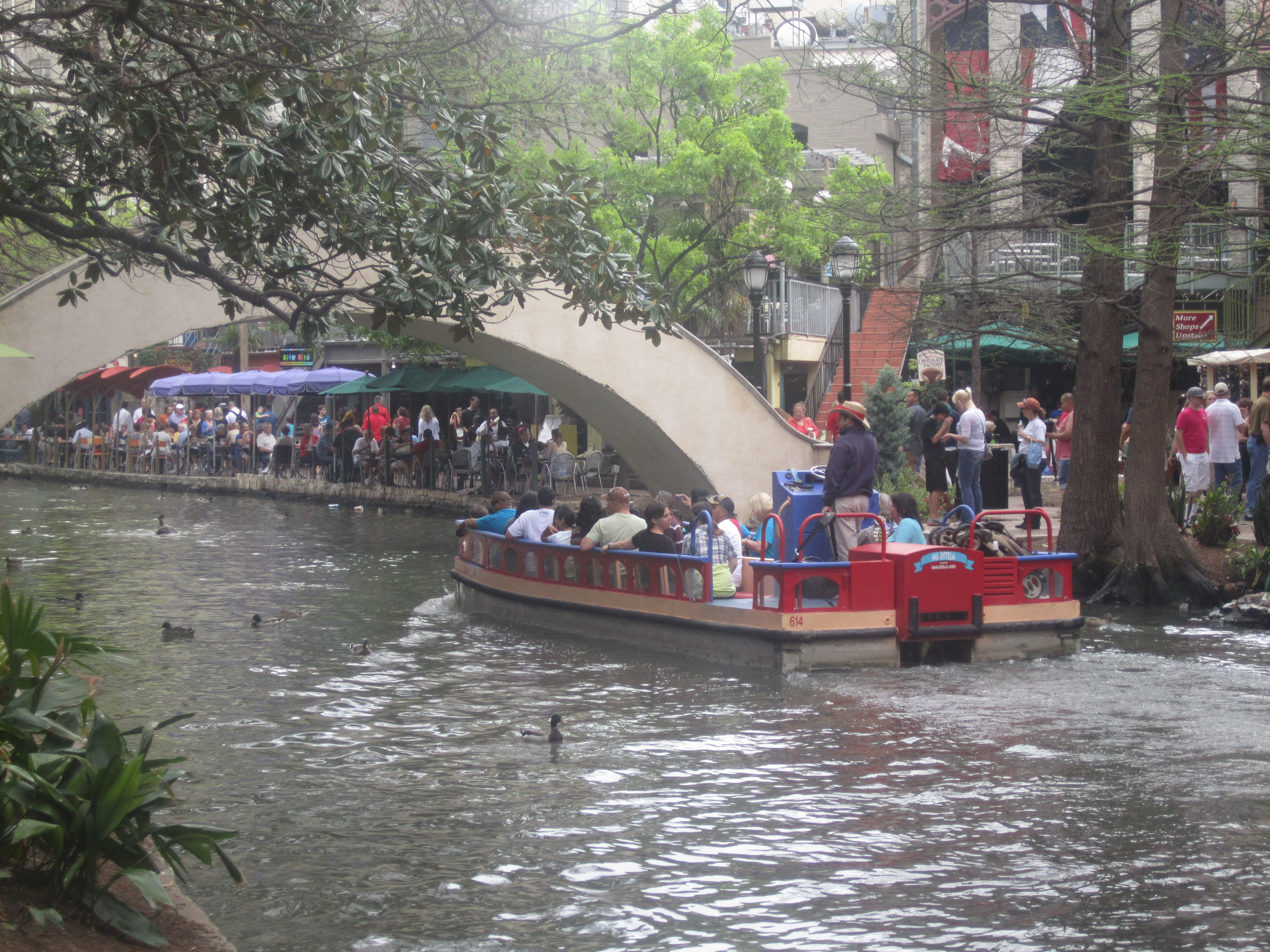
Riverwalk by Crockett Street Bridge looking towards the Original Mexican Restaurant

Hugman's plan was initially not well received – the area was noted for being dangerous. At one point, it was declared off-limits to military personnel. People were warned of the threat of being "drowned like a rat" should the river flood. However, over the next decade support for commercial development of the river bend grew, and crucial funding came in 1939 under the Works Progress Administration (WPA) which resulted in the initial construction of a network of some 17,000 feet (5,200 m) of walkways, about twenty bridges, and extensive plantings, including some of the bald cypress (others are several hundred years old) whose branches stretch up to ten stories and are visible from street level.

Hugman's persistence paid off; he was named project architect. His plan would be put to the test in 1946, when another major flood threatened downtown San Antonio, but the Olmos Dam and bypass channel minimized the area damage. Casa Rio, a landmark River Walk restaurant, became the first restaurant in the area in 1946, opening next door to Hugman's office.

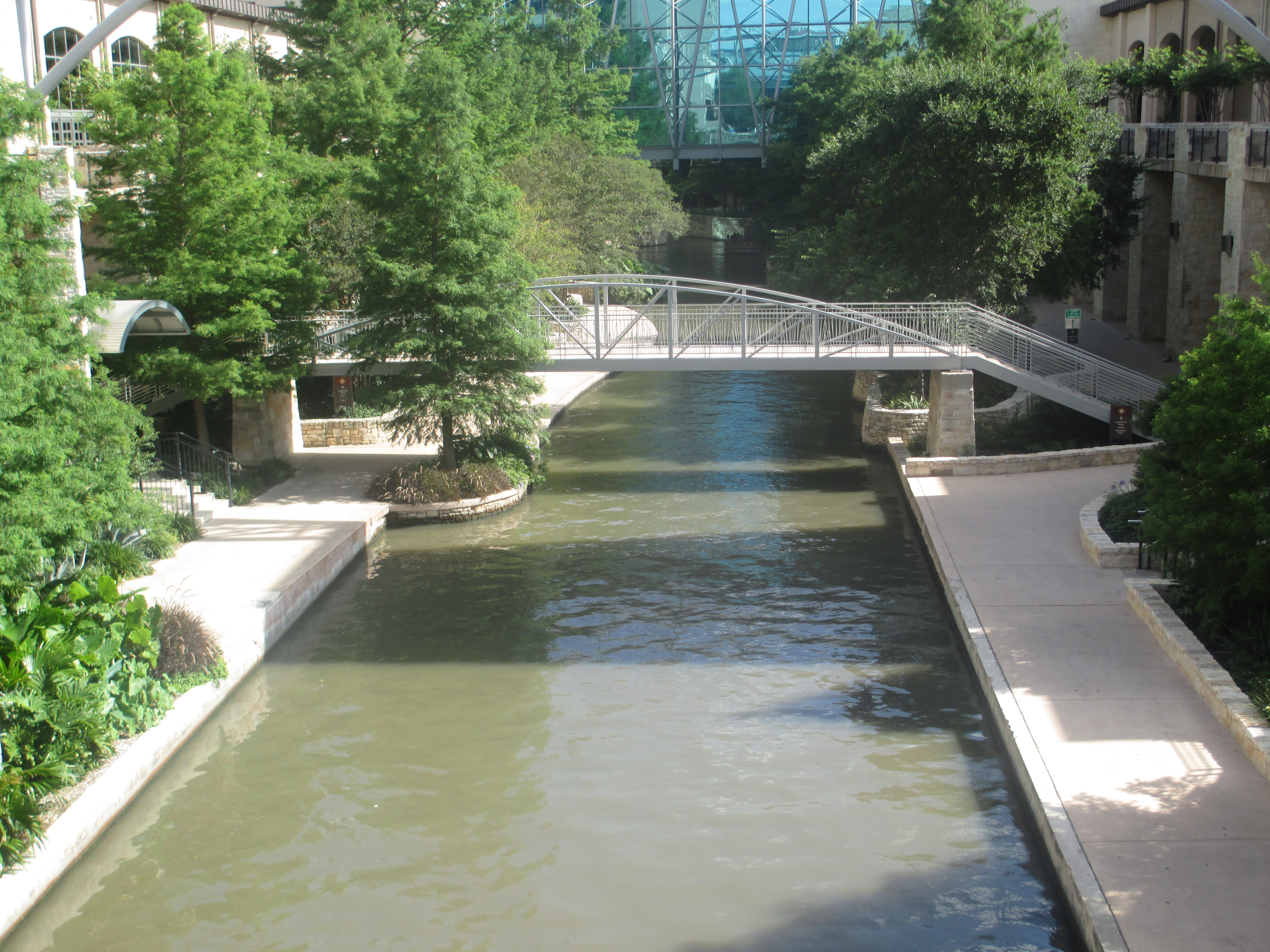
The extension of the San Antonio Riverwalk overlooking Market Street at the Henry B. Gonzalez Convention Center

Through the following decades the network has been improved and extended. The first major extension of the Riverwalk was constructed by the joint venture of two general contractors Darragh & Lyda Inc. and H. A. Lott Inc. to Tower of the Americas as part of HemisFair '68. The expansion extended the Riverwalk beyond its natural banks at the horseshoe bend to the new convention center and theater by excavating much of the block bordered by Commerce, Bowie, Market and Alamo Streets. That was also the year the Hilton Palacio del Rio was built, the first of many downtown hotels that leverage their slice of urban "riverfront." A subsequent major expansion opened in 1988 that extended a branch from the 1968 extension to create a lagoon at the new Rivercenter Mall and the Marriott Rivercenter Hotel.

In 1981 the Hyatt Regency San Antonio opened with a new pedestrian connector that linked Alamo Plaza to the River Walk with concrete waterfalls, waterways and indigenous landscaping. Known as the Paseo del Alamo, this river "extension" actually flows from Alamo Plaza into the San Antonio River through the atrium of the hotel. This connector not only allows the hotel to market itself as being on Alamo Plaza and on the River Walk, but it provides the city with an urban park that connects the city's two largest tourist attractions.

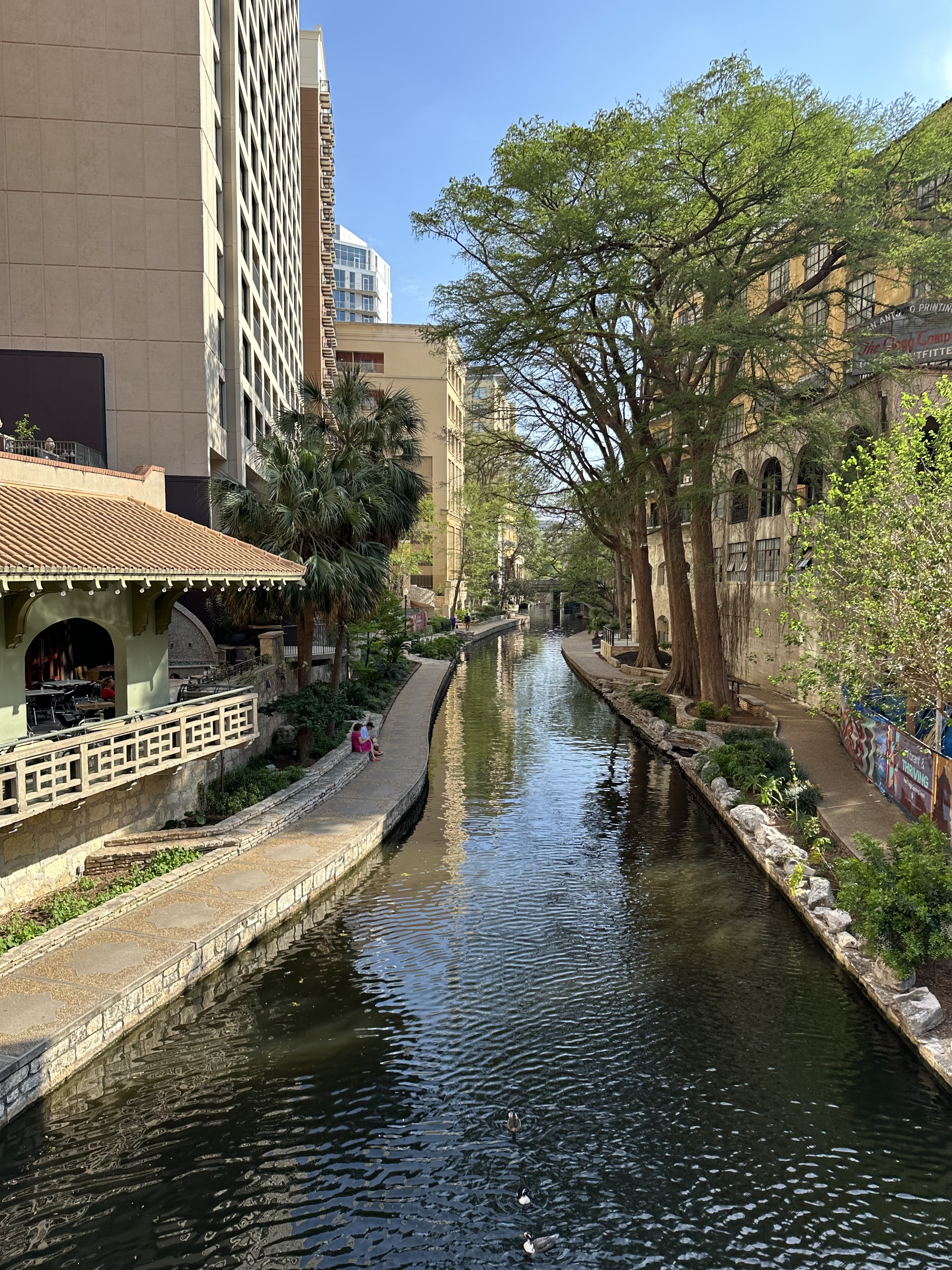
View of the River Walk in April 2025 from E Houston St

Many downtown buildings like the Casino Club Building have street entrances and separate river entrances one level below. This separates the automotive service grid (for delivery and emergency vehicles) from pedestrian traffic (below) through an intricate network of bridges, walkways, and old staircases. The San Antonio Spurs had their five NBA Championship victory parades/cruises along the river walk.

== Growth and expansion ==
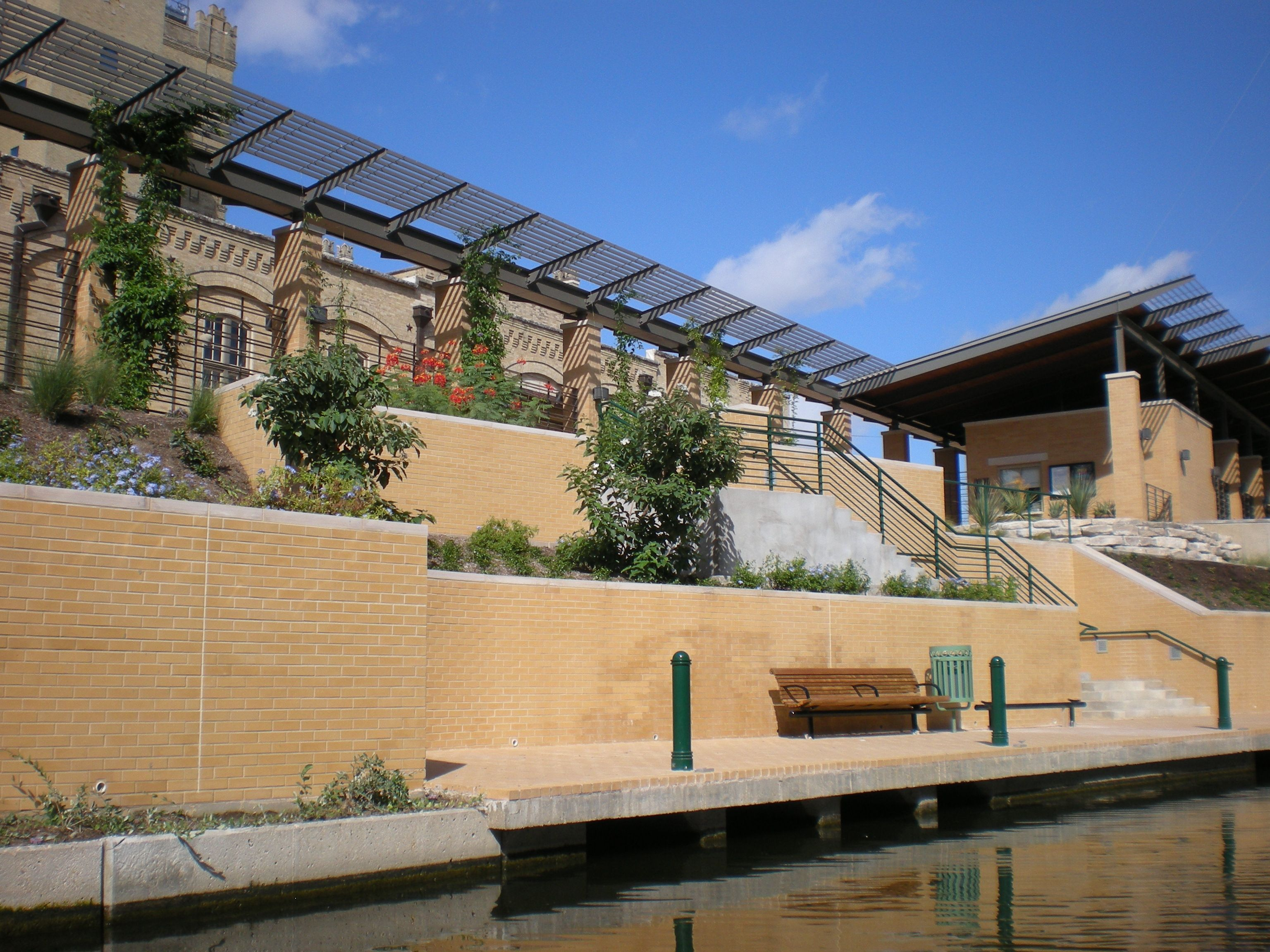
Boat landing for the San Antonio Museum of Art on the Museum Reach extension

Expansion plans are planned for areas of the river north and south of Downtown. As chain restaurants and establishments have begun to flourish, now taking up about a third of commercial space, talk has begun at City Hall about limiting their existence on the River Walk and keeping a distinctively local flair. On May 30, 2009, the city opened the $72 million Museum Reach. The Museum Reach features local attractions such as the San Antonio Museum of Art and The Pearl Brewery, which has become one of the most popular areas for locals.

Two years later, in May 2011, the River Walk was extended by several miles to extend from Downtown to Mission Espada which is on the city's south side. This addition (named the "Mission Reach") is notable for its emphasis on ecological controls and improvements, as well as trail improvements to support both hiking and biking. The Mission Reach has paddling trails and biking trails which allow tourists to experience the UNESCO World Heritage Missions.

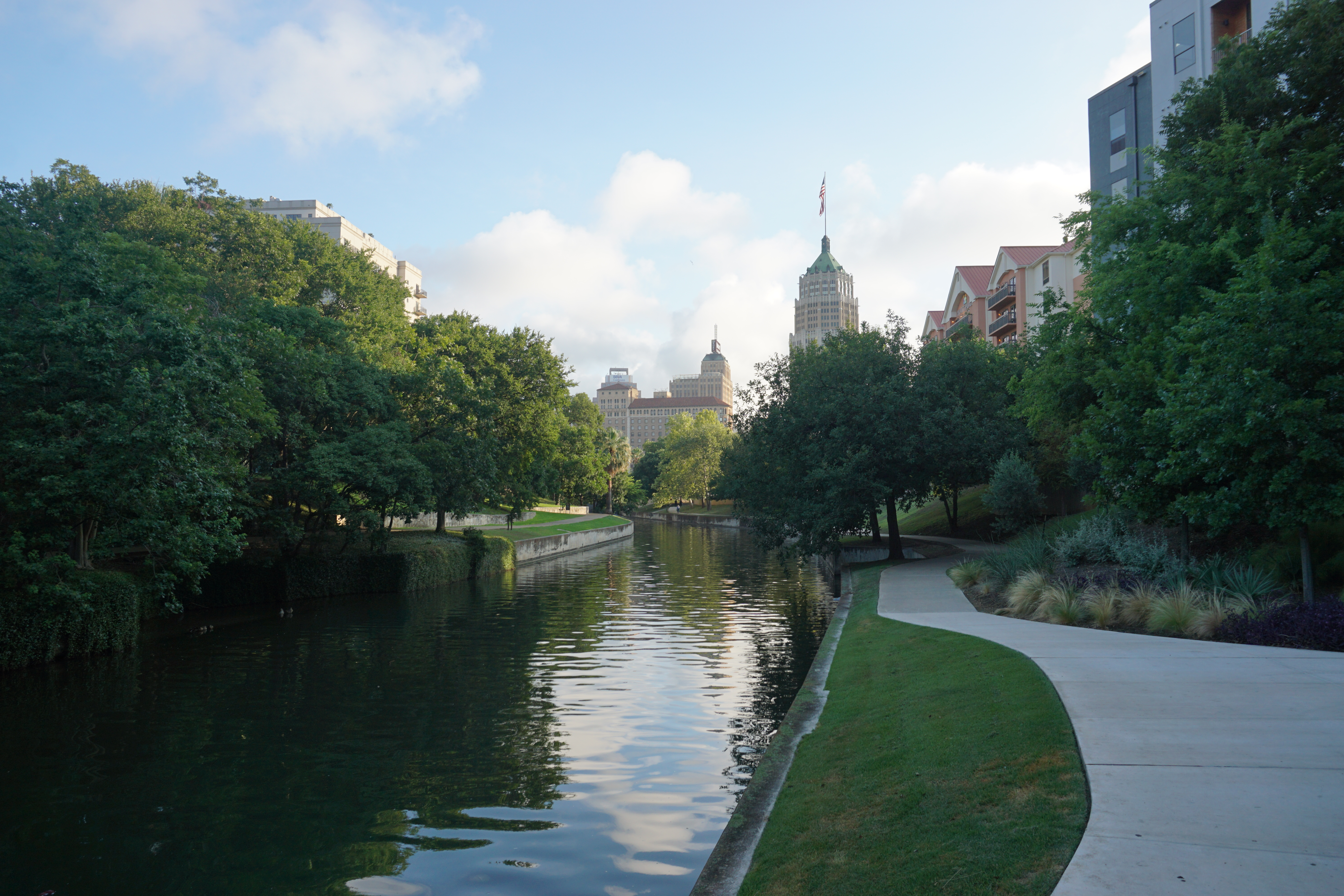
King William extension of the Downtown section, looking north towards the Civic Center District. Behind the camera would be Cesar Chavez Boulevard.

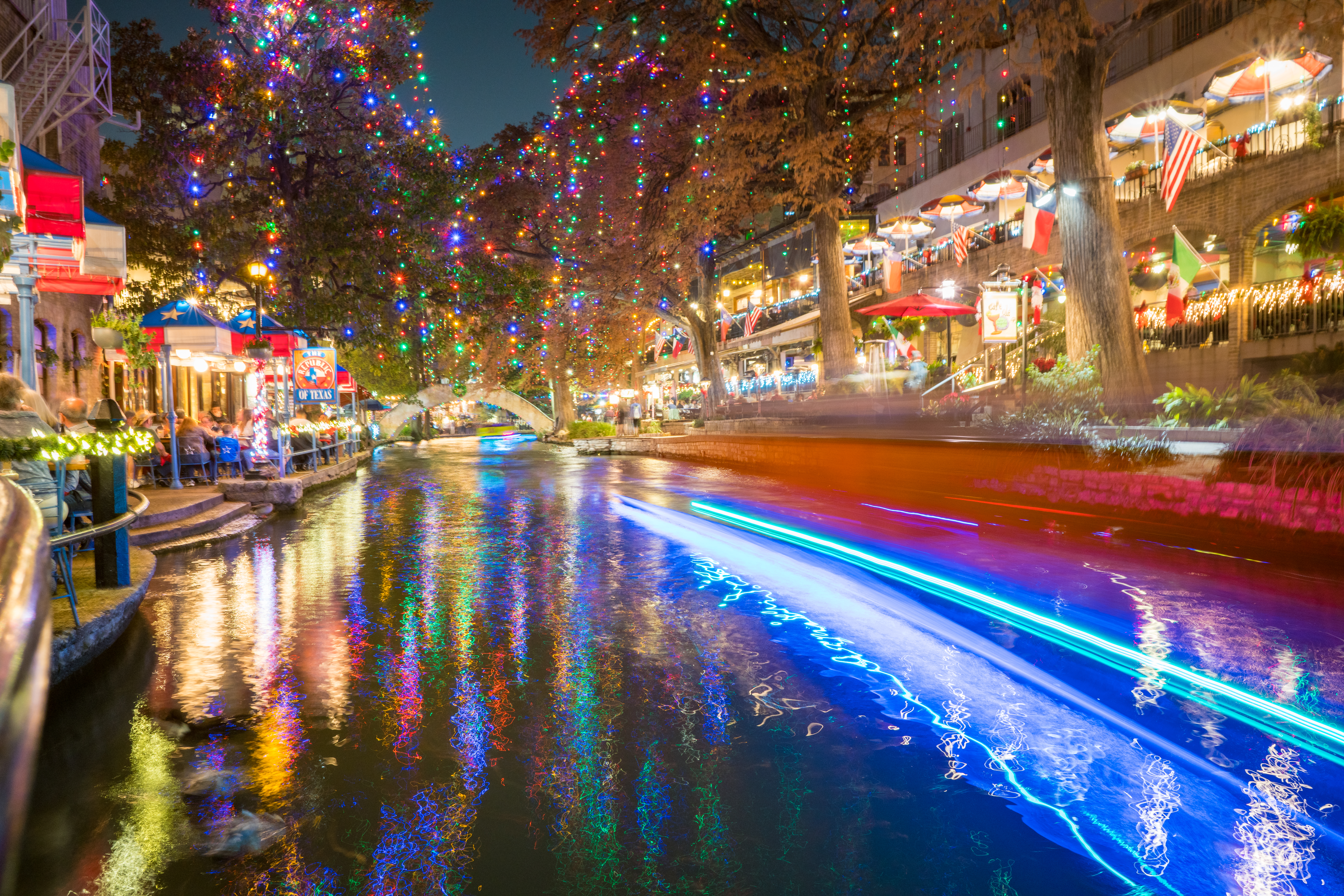
River Walk at night by the Republic of Texas Restaurant.

After years of murmuring from locals and tourists about the water's quality, talk has also begun about cleaning up the water, although the muddy bottom and silt deposits make this difficult. The muddy bottom does receive an annual cleaning during the Mud Festival.

In early 2016, for the first time in its history, the River Walk was connected with another linear urban walkway, the San Pedro Creek Greenway. The greenway joins with the River Walk at the confluence of the San Pedro Creek and the San Antonio River near Mission Concepción.

On May 25, 2017, Esperanza Andrade, a former Texas secretary of state, and Lisa Wong, her business partner in the company Go Rio San Antonio, prevailed in a 10–1 vote from the San Antonio City Council for the $100 million contract to operate the barges on the River Walk. The only dissenter on the council was the mayoral candidate Ron Nirenberg, who faced Mayor Ivy Taylor in a runoff election on June 10. In selecting Andrade and Wong, the council rejected City Manager Sheryl Sculley's recommendation to award the contract instead to the Chicago-based Entertainment Cruises, the choice also of former Mayor Phil Hardberger. On receiving the contract, Andrade told Taylor and the council: "We not only know but we understand why the River Walk is indeed our crown jewel of our beautiful city. And we understand that the barge operation is the thread that weaves it all together."

In 2021, the River Walk was temporarily used as a source of water after a winter storm crippled infrastructure across Texas.

== Impact ==
The River Walk has inspired similar projects in other cities, such as the Little Sugar Creek Greenway in Charlotte, North Carolina, the Cherry Creek Greenway in Denver, Colorado, the Bricktown Canal in Oklahoma City, Oklahoma, and the Santa Lucía Riverwalk in Monterrey, Mexico.

== In film ==
In 1972, the River Walk is featured in The Getaway in a scene with Steve McQueen and Al Lettieri.

The 1984 film Cloak & Dagger includes an extended chase scene along the River Walk.

In 1997, the so-called Selena Bridge on the River Walk between Navarro and North St. Mary's streets provides a romantic setting for a scene in Selena, the biopic starring Jennifer Lopez in the title role as the late Tejano singer.

In the 2000 film Miss Congeniality, portions of the River Walk are seen in the beauty pageant scenes.

== See also ==
- Fiesta Noche del Rio
- List of restaurant districts and streets in the United States
