= Detention dam =

A detention dam is a dam built to catch surface runoff and stream water flow to regulate the water flow in areas below the dam. Detention dams are commonly used to reduce the damage caused by flooding or to manage the flow rate through a channel. Detention dams can also be constructed to replenish groundwater and trap sediment. Detention dams are one of three classifications of dams: storage dams, diversion dams, and detention dams. Storage dams store water for extended times for irrigation, livestock, municipal water supply, recreation, and hydroelectric power generation. Diversion dams raise the water level to redirect the water to a designated location. The diverted water typically supplies irrigation systems or reservoirs.

== Purposes ==
People build detention dams for purposes that include: flood control, flow rate restriction, subsurface water replenishment, and sediment trapping. Detention dams are common in flood prone areas for flood control. A detention dam is built at an elevation above the flood prone zone. Flood water collects in the basin above the dam and is released at a flow rate the flood zone and channel can accommodate. Channels can include dikes, canals, streams, drain pipes, and rivers. The basin above a flood detention dam should remain at the lowest water level to prevent overtopping. Overtopping is when the water level behind the dam exceeds the dam crest height. The dam crest is the top edge of the dam. Overtopping is caused by extreme flooding or severe waves. The severe waves can be a result of high winds, landslides, and earthquakes. The detention dam design must take into account the probability of overtopping occurring and be designed accordingly. Detention dams built to restrict flow rate regulate the amount water released into channels. Detentions dams used to replenish the subsurface water or groundwater hold surface runoff to allow the ground to absorb the water. Groundwater is water that has drained into an aquifer due to the force of gravity. An aquifer is layers of permeable soils and rocks below the earth's surface that allow water to accumulated between the rocks and soils. Debris dams are a type of detention dam used to collect sediment to prevent it from flowing into areas where large sediment buildup may be damaging.

== Design ==
Detention dams have two basic designs. The detention dam can be made from concrete or masonry, usually with a metal reinforcing substructure. The concrete or masonry style dam commonly has a cross sectional shape similar to a right triangle with the sloping face pointing downstream and the perpendicular face pointing upstream. Detention dams can also be made from rock or earth to form a gravity embankment style dam. The cross sectional shape of an earth and rock gravity embankment style dam closely resembles an equal lateral triangle with the angled sides facing upstream and downstream. Modern detentions dam designs incorporate safety factors that account for and compensate for the probability of failure.

=== Flood detention dam design ===
Flood detention dams are commonly used as part of a flood or storm water detention system. Flood detention systems combine detention basins, detention dams, and channels to efficiently collect and regulate runoff. Detention facilities not only regulate the amount of released water, but control release water quality. Systems monitor runoff to prevent contaminates and debris from damaging lakes, rivers, and wetlands. Flood detention dams are constructed methodically. Engineers analyze watershed topographical data, hydrological records, and geological structure for the area to determine the most effective locations flood detention dams. The analyzed watershed topographical data, hydrological records, and geological structure display the potential storage capacity, environmental impacts, and physical limitations of the area. This produces models that simulate the effectiveness of possible flood detention dam locations and designs. The general design for a flood detention dam has a cross sectional shape of a trapezoid, where the longer of the parallel sides is the base of the dam, and the angled sides face upstream and downstream. The flood detention dam has an opening at the top to release the flood water at a controlled rate that the channels below can accommodate. Flood detention dam models help determine the necessary dam height and overflow opening size to prevent over-topping.

== Disadvantages ==
Detention dams can cause injury and damage if they are not built and maintained correctly. Poorly maintained and older detention dams can pose a reliability threat because they may not meet the current structural safety and hydraulic requirements. For example, a detention dam in a populated area that does not conform to the current structural safety and hydraulic requirements has a high probability of failing. If severe flooding were to occur, the nonconforming detention dam could be overtopped and breached resulting in injury and damage of the surrounding populated area below the detention dam.

== Examples ==
=== Sediment detention dams ===
The area of Fifteenmile Creek, Wyoming was flagged by the United States Department of the Interior Bureau of Land Management in the 1960s because the area was in need of an aggressive sediment control system. Over the course of 10 years, US$2 million was spent to construct 34 sediment detention dams, 110 reservoirs, and 21 spreader dikes to manage the sediment issue. The sediment control system was intended to reduce the amount of suspended sediment in the Bighorn River. The high sediment concentration in the Bighorn River was largely attributed to the drainage from the Fifteenmile Creek erosion. The control system was intended to reduce the sediment amount by 25%. However, 20 years after installation the control system was analyzed and uncovered that the detention dams had been improperly maintained, resulting in sediment detention failure. In addition to poor maintenance, the functional lives of the detention dams were shortened because of the location and climate. As a result, people who live downstream of the Bighorn River have to cope with the effects of the sediment. The high amounts of sediment released from the failed detention dams and control system have increased the cost to filter municipal water due to suspended sediment in the Bighorn River. The high sediment deposits have also damaged fisheries and reduced the amount of water that can be stored in a downstream reservoir.

=== Flood detention dams ===
In San Antonio, Texas, the Olmos Creek detention dam was constructed primarily as a flood detention dam. It also acts as a debris or sediment detention dam to trap pollutants from entering the regional water supply. The Olmos Creek detention dam is unique because it is located in an urban area with a large floodplain. As a result, the dam is a multipurpose facility that can handle large floods, trap pollutants, and provide a recreational and wildlife area for the community.
