= San Antonio River Authority =

- Abbreviation: SARA
- Formation: 1937
- Type: Government-owned corporation
- Purpose: Water conservation and reclamation
- Headquarters: 100 East Guenther Street, San Antonio, Texas, 78204
- Region served: Bexar, Goliad, Karnes, and Wilson counties, Texas
- General Manager: Derek E. Boese
- Main organ: Board of Directors
- Website: https://www.sariverauthority.org/

The San Antonio River Authority (SARA), created in 1937, is a river authority in the State of Texas. Its jurisdiction covers 3,658 square miles—all of Bexar, Wilson, Karnes and Goliad Counties. In 1917, the voters of Texas passed a constitutional amendment allowing the legislature to create river authorities, which are responsible for developing and conserving the state's water resources. The authorities are appointed by the state to serve regional areas, generally coincidental with river basins. This act was also a solution inspired by the problems brought by the devastating floods of 1913 and 1914.

A 12-member Board of Directors governs the San Antonio River Authority (River Authority). Six directors are elected from Bexar County and two are elected from each of the three other counties with each elected member serving four years. Policies established by the Board are executed by the management organization under the direction of a General Manager appointed by the Board.

The San Antonio River Authority has the statutory authority to impose an ad valorem tax for use in planning, operations and maintenance activities only. Its tax is statutorily limited to two cents per $100 of the assessed property valuation. The adopted ad valorem tax rate is $0.01787 (1.787 cents) per $100 assessed property valuation. The average annual tax is $55.13. The adopted FY 2024-2025 budget is $373.8 million.

== Dams and reservoirs ==
SARA operates 13 dams in Karnes County and all 26 dams in Bexar County.

SARA also provides project assistance in maintaining and improving the famed San Antonio River Walk.
