= Thrall, Texas =

- City
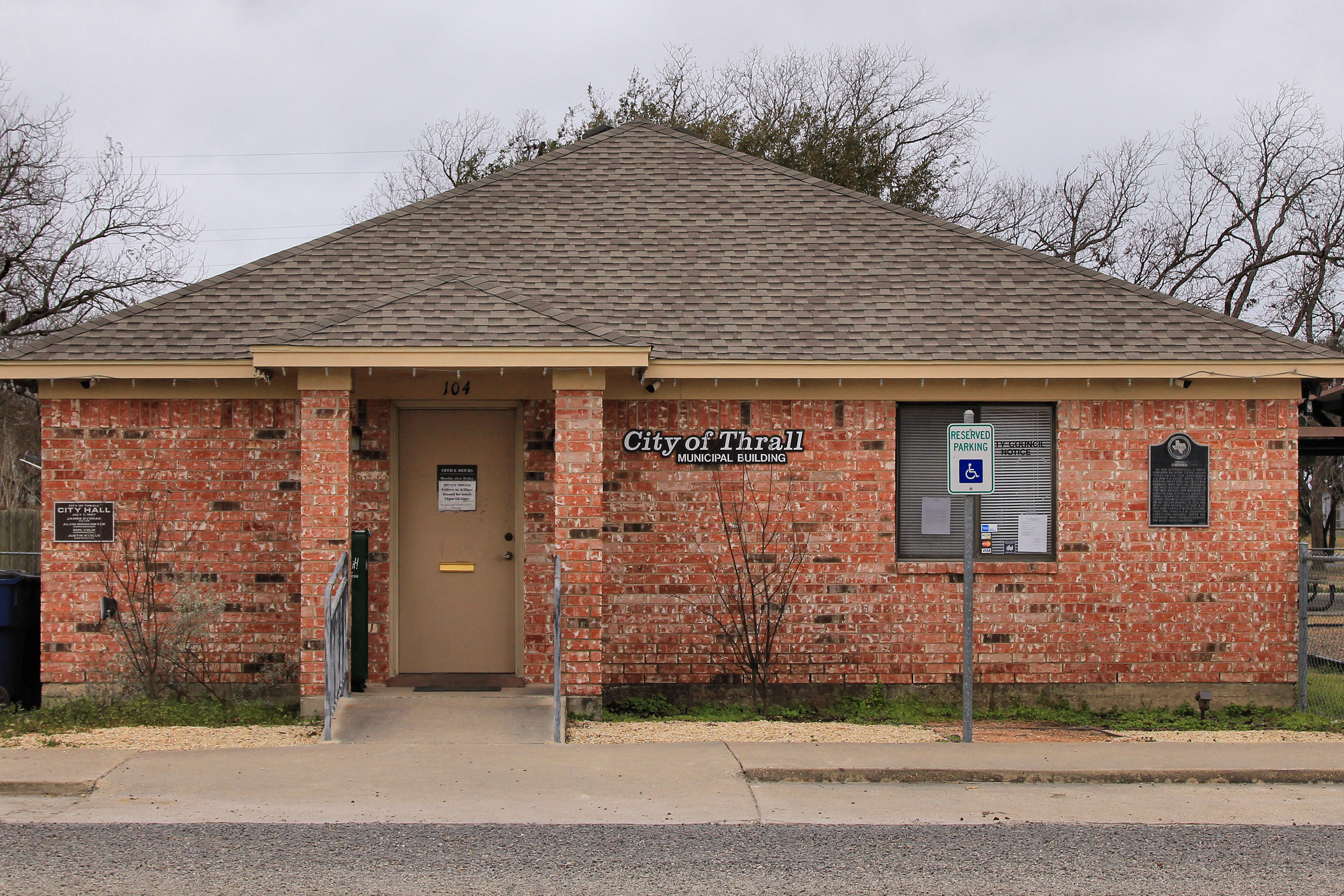
- Thrall Municipal Building

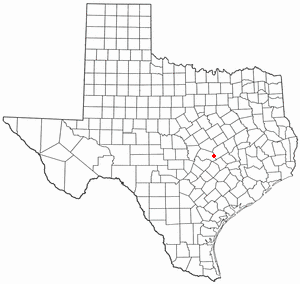
- Location of Thrall, Texas

- Coordinates: 30°35′19″N 97°17′55″W
- Country: United States
- State: Texas
- County: Williamson

Government
  - Mayor: Troy Marx

Area
  - Total: 0.46 sq mi (1.20 km^{2})
  - Land: 0.46 sq mi (1.20 km^{2})
  - Water: 0 sq mi (0.00 km^{2})
- Elevation: 561 ft (171 m)

Population (2020)
  - Total: 816
  - Density: 2,113.1/sq mi (815.86/km^{2})
- Time zone: UTC-6 (Central (CST))
  - Summer (DST): UTC-5 (CDT)
- ZIP code: 76578
- Area code: 512
- FIPS code: 48-72824
- GNIS feature ID: 1369876
- Website: Thrall webpage

Thrall is a city in Williamson County, Texas, United States. Its population was 816 at the 2020 census. The name Thrall was chosen by the community to honor the Rev. Homer S. Thrall, a Methodist minister and historian much admired by local settlers and residents. Thrall was founded in 1876.

== Geography ==
Thrall is located at 30°35′19″N 97°17′55″W (30.588640, –97.298707), approximately 35 miles northeast of Austin.

According to the United States Census Bureau, the city has a total area of 0.4 square mile (1.1 km^{2}), all land. It is located in Williamson County.

== Demographics ==
Historical population
Census	Pop.	Note	%±
1920	272		—
1930	422		55.1%
1940	436		3.3%
1950	585		34.2%
1960	631		7.9%
1970	619		−1.9%
1980	573		−7.4%
1990	550		−4.0%
2000	710		29.1%
2010	839		18.2%
2020	816		−2.7%
U.S. Decennial Census

=== 2020 census ===
As of the 2020 census, Thrall had a population of 816. The median age was 37.7 years. 27.0% of residents were under the age of 18 and 14.2% of residents were 65 years of age or older. For every 100 females there were 95.7 males, and for every 100 females age 18 and over there were 98.7 males age 18 and over.

0.0% of residents lived in urban areas, while 100.0% lived in rural areas.

There were 301 households in Thrall, of which 42.9% had children under the age of 18 living in them. Of all households, 46.8% were married-couple households, 21.6% were households with a male householder and no spouse or partner present, and 25.9% were households with a female householder and no spouse or partner present. About 25.2% of all households were made up of individuals and 6.7% had someone living alone who was 65 years of age or older.

There were 329 housing units, of which 8.5% were vacant. The homeowner vacancy rate was 0.9% and the rental vacancy rate was 12.0%.

Racial composition as of the 2020 census
Race	Number	Percent
White	573	70.2%
Black or African American	61	7.5%
American Indian and Alaska Native	4	0.5%
Asian	2	0.2%
Native Hawaiian and Other Pacific Islander	0	0.0%
Some other race	93	11.4%
Two or more races	83	10.2%
Hispanic or Latino (of any race)	233	28.6%

=== 2000 census ===
As of the 2000 census, 710 people, 255 households, and 189 families resided in the city. The population density was 1,746.8 inhabitants per square mile (674.4/km^{2}). The 264 housing units had an average density of 649.5 per square mile (250.8/km^{2}). The racial makeup of the city was 70.00% White, 8.59% African American, 1.41% Native American, 0.14% Pacific Islander, 18.03% from other races, and 1.83% from two or more races. Hispanics or Latinos of any race were 35.92% of the population.

Of the 255 households, 37.6% had children under 18 living with them, 56.1% were married couples living together, 11.4% had a female householder with no husband present, and 25.5% were not families. About 23.5% of all households were made up of individuals, and 15.7% had someone living alone who was 65 or older. The average household size was 2.78, and the average family size was 3.28.

In the city, the age distribution was 30.1% under 18, 6.6% from 18 to 24, 27.6% from 25 to 44, 19.4% from 45 to 64, and 16.2% who were 65 or older. The median age was 34 years. For every 100 females, there were 91.4 males. For every 100 females 18 and over, there were 88.6 males.

The median income for a household in the city was $34,205, and for a family was $36,845. Males had a median income of $28,897 versus $17,813 for females. The per capita income for the city was $13,807. About 12.4% of families and 19.2% of the population were below the poverty line, including 20.7% of those under age 18 and 21.5% of those age 65 or over.

== Education ==
The city of Thrall is served by the Thrall Independent School District, home to the Thrall High School Tigers.

== Thrall flood ==
From September 7 to 10, 1921, the remnants of a hurricane moved over Williamson County. The center of the storm became stationary over Thrall, dropping a storm total of 39.7 inches of rain in 36 hours.

Eighty-seven people drowned in and near Taylor, and 93 in Williamson County. Thrall rainfall was 23.4 inches during 6 hours, 31.8 in. during 12 hours, and 36.4 in. during 18 hours. This storm caused the most deadly floods in Texas, with a total of 215 fatalities.
