= Starcke =

Starcke may refer to:

== Places ==
- Starcke, Queensland, Australia

== People ==
- Carl Nicolai Starcke (1858–1926), Danish sociologist, politician, educator and philosopher
- Dagmar Starcke (1899–1975), Danish painter and textile artist
- Hans Starcke (1875–1943), German artist and author
- Henrik Starcke (1899–1973), Danish sculptor
- Max Starcke (1884–1972), American businessman and government official in Texas
  - Max Starcke Dam

== See also ==
- Juunju Daarrba Nhirrpan National Park (Cape York Peninsula Aboriginal Land), formerly Starcke National Park)
- Richard Starcke House (disambiguation)
