= Hardscramble =

- U.S. National Register of Historic Places
- Location within Texas Location within the United States
- Location: 1806 Tschoepe Rd., Seguin, Texas
- Coordinates: 29°38′4″N 97°52′52″W
- Built: 1841
- Built by: Ben McCulloch, State of Texas
- NRHP reference No.: 11000424
- Added to NRHP: July 6, 2011

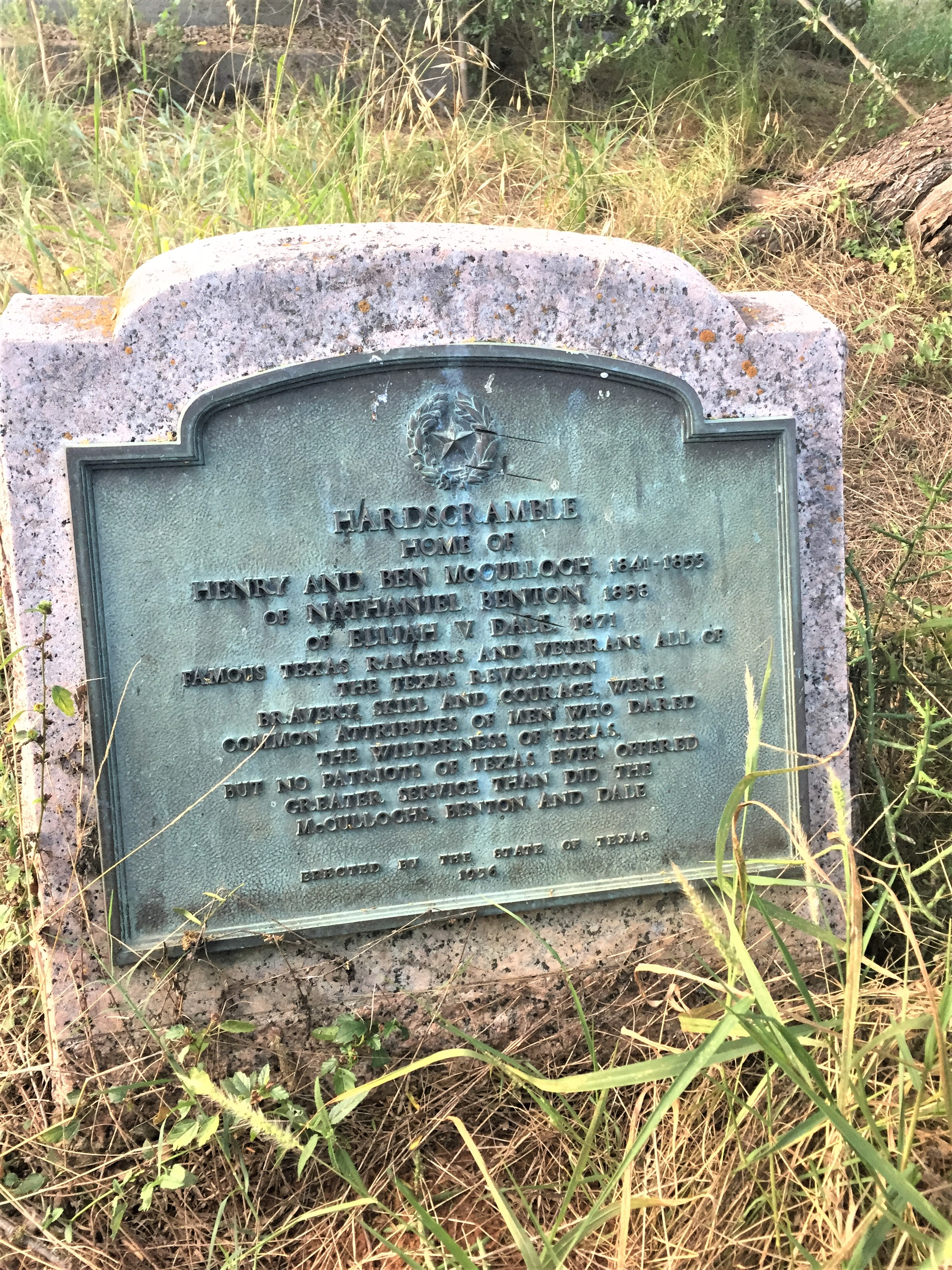
Texas centennial marker

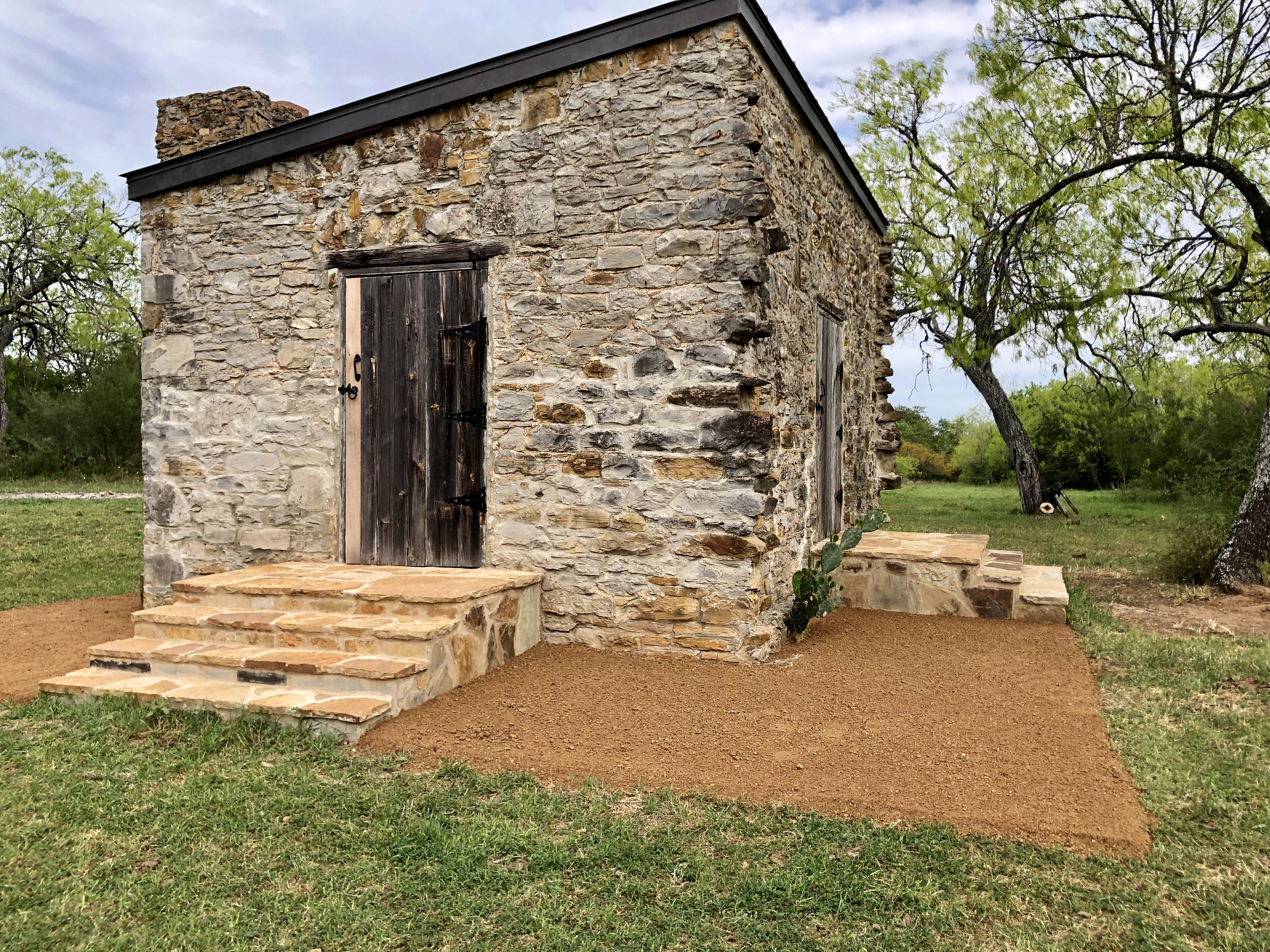
Hardscramble cabin

Hardscramble is the name given to an early 1800s stone structure located near Seguin, Texas, that was used as a home station by some of the earliest and most famous Texas Rangers.

== History ==
According to research for a Texas historical marker, Hardscramble located on 1806 Tschoepe Rd., Seguin, Texas was the home station of early Texas Rangers, Henry McCulloch and Benjamin McCulloch from 1841 until 1853.

Nathaniel Benton occupied the building in 1858 and later in 1871, it was home to Elijah Dale.

A Texas Centennial marker was placed to honor the location and its history in 1936. The old ranger station and marker still stand at the location and occasional tours can be arranged locally.

A second and older adobe Walnut Branch Ranger Station and hospital once stood at the corner of Court and Guadalupe Streets. It was used by the Caldwell, Callahan and Hays Rangers. No longer standing, it was unexpectedly razed around 2000. A city historical marker has been placed to honor and identify the location.

== See also ==
National Register of Historic Places listings in Guadalupe County, Texas
