= Rosita Fernández =

Mexican-American musician (1918–2006)

Rosita Fernández (January 10, 1918 – May 2, 2006) was a Mexican American Tejano music singer, humanitarian, and actress. She became a symbol of "Old Mexico" among European Americans in San Antonio, and was called the city's First Lady of Song by Lady Bird Johnson.

== Early life ==
Fernández was born in Monterrey, Mexico to parents Petra San Miguel and Cesar Fernández. At the age of six Fernández and her family crossed the U.S. border into Laredo, Texas, where she would receive her early education. Fernández talked about her family's immigration to the U.S in an interview, "The border didn't exist. It was very easy. My father and mother with so much family. What they charged then was five pesos per person and three-fifty or four for the little ones. It was much easier." The Fernández family moved to San Antonio, Texas, when Rosita was nine. Rosita stated that she got her love of music from hearing her mother sing to her as a child. Fernández joined her family band, Los Tres San Miguel, which consisted of her uncles (her mother's brothers), at the age of nine. She had performed only in front of her relatives before becoming the band's lead vocalist.

== Music career ==
In 1932, Fernández became the star of a radio program on WOAI, a station that broadcast musical performances, soap operas, and agricultural news in San Antonio. In 1933 she recorded jingles for several radio commercials. The first were for Frito-Lay; later ads promoted beer and tortillas to Mexican-Americans. She sang in Spanish, which gave her opportunities to perform on air. In 1938, Fernández married Raúl A. Almaguer. The couple had two children. In 1949, she performed on the first broadcast on WOAI television, and she later became a regular on several shows. In her early performances, she mostly worked with traveling shows such as La Carpa Cubana or Stout Jackson’s El Teatro Carpa. Most of these shows were segregated public presentations to Anglo-Americans. The shows catered to Mexican-American audiences as technology progressed, providing more and different forms of entertainment in movies and radio. This opened opportunities for Fernández to sing to Anglo-Americans, exposing them to a different kind of culture and music. Through her music Fernández gave voice to imagery of aspects of the heritage of Mexico. She spoke through lyrics telling tales of struggles, such as being an outsider in an Anglo-dominated Texas. It also promoted Mexican-American consumer goods and gave comfort to immigrants from Mexico to Texas. Fernández’s music and voice provided for many newcomers topics they had been familiar with back in the homeland. The Mexican-American culture weighed heavily in San Antonio through Fernández's music.^{[1]}

== Acting career ==
The production of more talkie films opened up more opportunities for Mexican-American actresses. Fernández pushed for more depictions of traditional Mexican heritage, including promotion of Texas in more than just songs. Fernández played minor roles in movies including Giant (1956), The Alamo (1960), Sancho, the Homing Steer (1962), and Seguin (1982). These films all tie back to Texas roots and feature nationalism and pride for Texans and Tejanos. She starred in these films, giving more glimpses inside the past of Texas and the culture of Mexican-Americans. At the time these films were created, there were more Anglo-American women than minority women in films. Fernández's small roles in these films broke barriers in the United States. She was a woman of color acting in movies in which the majority of actors and actresses were white; this was significant for the Mexican-American community.

Rosita Fernández, the Mexican-American singer and actress, is not to be confused with the French actress of the same name, whose film career spanned 1955–2005.^{[1]}

== Humanitarian work ==
In her late career she became an Ambassador for the city of San Antonio, eventually writing a song titled the same thing. She challenged norms of the time creating another culture and perspective for Mexican American in Texas. Rosita Fernandez participated in Fiesta Noche Del Rio and Arneson River Theater. Instead of going completely mainstream with her music she remained locally to give the city more of an attraction and life. Rosita Fernandez gave the city more than just money for organizations by providing the city with romanticization of Mexican American Culture. She chose to career less mainstream for her love for the city of San Antonio, choosing money, international fame, and a life of luxury for promotion of Mexican American Heritage. Rosita chose to work as a middle-class performer over becoming an elite, this made her Lydia Mendoza more stardom. Rosita Fernandez was a conservatist for the cultures of San Antonio giving them more popularity and her songs created a deeper cultural root to Mexican Americans in Old San Antonio. She was called Old Mexico due to her representation of the culture; she also changed the yellow rose of Texas to Rosa San Antonio which gave Mexican American women a light. The yellow rose remained but Rosita Fernandez paved another rose for the city of Old Mexico.

== Significance ==
Rosita Fernandez is remembered strongly in San Antonio through Rosita's Bridge, her bridge named in her honor located on the Riverwalk. Rosita Fernandez’s investment of preserving San Antonio through her public singing in such events as Night in Old Mexico. She did more for the city of San Antonio commercially through her jingles and radio shows promoting Mexican American consumer items like food and supplies. She became a pioneer of corridos, and recorded romantica style ballads in the male-dominated genre of Tejano music. Another object that represented Rosita Fernandez was her China Poblana, it was a dress she wore throughout her career. It represented her travels through her career and worn at special occasions, it represented her heritage in Chicana culture. Rosita had many different dress each representing a significance of multiple performances in her career. The dresses became a symbol amongst women in the Chicana community used in other forms of art like today. They are used in art at Mexican American restaurants with men dressed in Mariachi outfits, her dress paved way for dresses used in musical performances like Ballet Folklorico. She started a trend that lasted for decades, it had spread across Texas. The China Poblana was a racist form, Rosita used it to represent feminism for Mexican American women as breaking through the norms. It traced back to mestizas and Criollos in pre-Mexico. Rosita Fernandez used the China Poblana for her break free from the traditions of Mexican American culture, she became more than just a woman performer but a symbol of breaking the norms. Fernández is part of the Smithsonian Collections at the National Museum of American History with her china poblana dress, which was made in the 1960s. Beginning in the 1950s, Fernandez performed in the annual summer show Fiesta Noche del Rio at the Arneson River Theater on the San Antonio River. She also was a featured performer each spring at the A Night in Old San Antonio event at San Antonio's Fiesta celebration. In 1967, San Antonio radio station KCOR recognized Fernandez as a "source of entertainment" at the riverwalk, convention centers, and for her public performances at charity events. The city renamed a bridge after her in 1982, which attracts 5.2 million visitors each year. Fernandez first retired from performing in 1982, but continued to make guest appearances into the 1990s.

== Filmography ==
Year	Title	Role	Notes
1956	Giant		Minor role
1960	The Alamo	Cantina Girl	Uncredited
1962	Walt Disney's Wonderful World of Color	Maria	
1962	Sancho, the Homing Steer		
1982	Seguin		

== Sources ==
- Villarreal, Mary Ann (2015). Listening to Rosita: The Business of Tejana Music and Culture 1930-1955. Norman, OK: University of Oklahoma Press. ISBN 978-0806148526.
- Vargas, Deborah R. “Rosita Fernandez” “Dissonant Divas in Chicana Music the Limits of La Onda”. University of Minnesota Press. (2012)
- Vargas, Deborah R. “Rosita Fernandez: La Rosa de San Antonio” University of Nebraska Press. (2003)
