= Robert Hall House =

- U.S. National Register of Historic Places
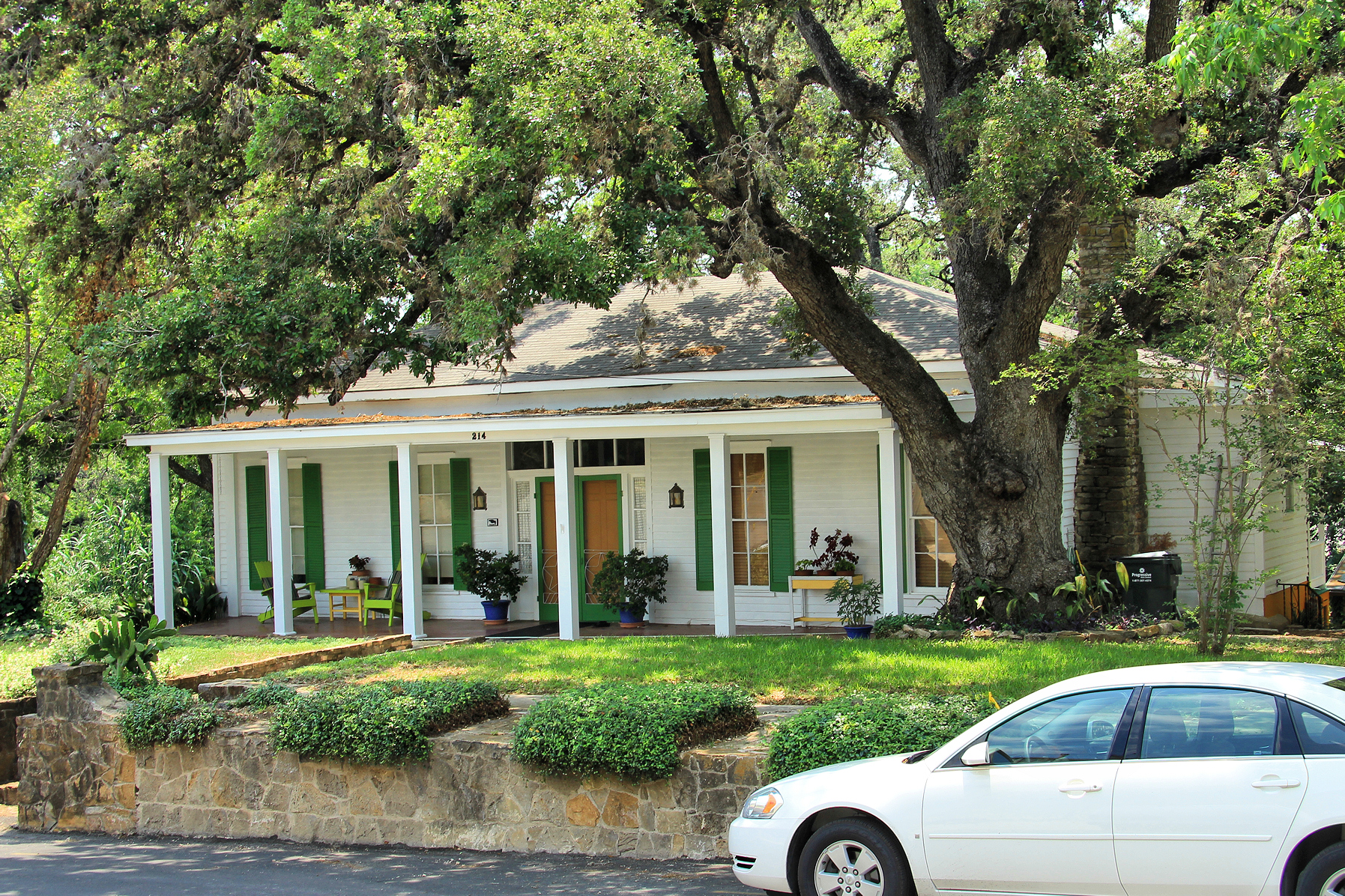
- Hall House in 2013

- Location within Texas Location within the United States
- Location: 214 S. Travis St, Seguin, Texas
- Coordinates: 29°34′3.2″N 97°57′59.6″W
- Area: less than one acre
- Built: 1838
- Architectural style: Greek Revival
- NRHP reference No.: 79002949
- Added to NRHP: October 25, 1979

The Robert Hall House is a historic 1830s home on the Walnut Branch. The house was the residence of the early ranger, Robert Hall (1814–1899). It is among the oldest structures still standing in Seguin, Texas.

Hall had moved to Texas in 1835 and served with the crew of the Yellowstone during the Texas Revolution. He later joined the regular Texas Army for a six month term on June 1, 1836. He would join the Texas Rangers located near Seguin, who were commanded by Mathew Caldwell, Jack Coffee Hays and Benjamin McCulloch. In 1838, Hall and other rangers co-founded the city of Seguin. Hall married Mary Minerva "Polly" King, a daughter of Colonel John Gladden King and built his home beside the Walnut Branch at what is the northwest corner of present-day Travis and Nolte Streets. From this location he could walk northward along the Walnut Branch and check on his fellow rangers at the Walnut Branch Ranger Station (which was located near the present-day intersection of Court and Guadalupe Streets). Hall also served in the Texas-Indian Wars, Mexican Invasions of Texas, Mexican American War and American Civil War.

Locally remembered as the Hall-Burges-Glenewinkel home, this old home stills stands, although somewhat modified from its original log cabin construction.

== See also ==
National Register of Historic Places listings in Guadalupe County, Texas

== Citations ==
- Gesick, E. John (1995), Under the Live Oak Tree: A History of Seguin, Seguin, TX: Tommy Brown Printing
- Hardin and "Brazos", Stephen L. (1992), Life of Robert Hall, Austin, TX: State House Press, ISBN 0938349902
