= Rosita's Bridge =

Bridge in Texas

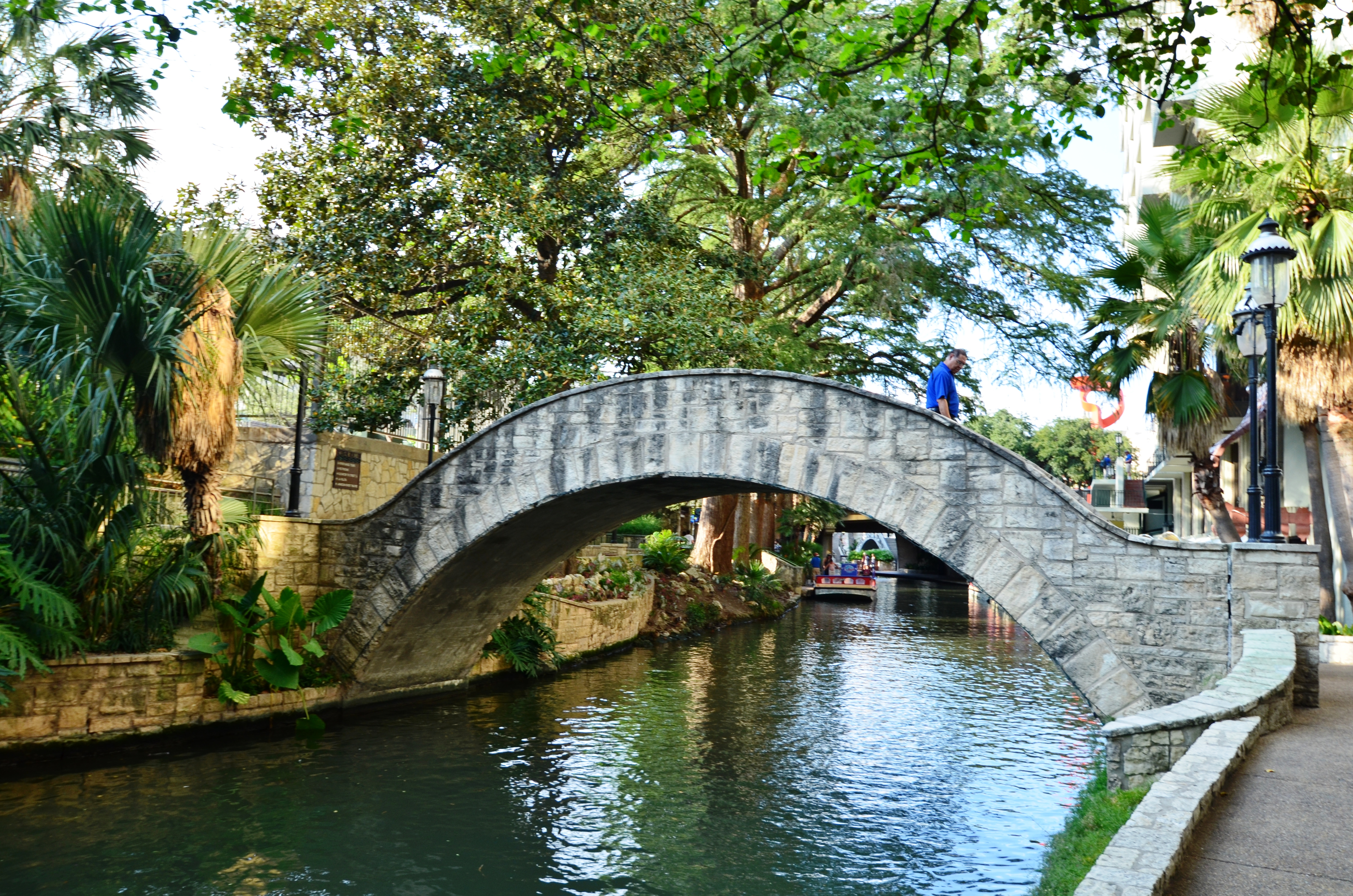
- The bridge in 2012
- Coordinates: 29.4223°N 98.4886°W
- Crosses: San Antonio River
- Named for: Rosita Fernández
- Owner: City of San Antonio

Characteristics
- Design: Arch bridge
- Material: Concrete
- Total length: 37 ft (11 m)
- Width: 7 ft (2.1 m)

History
- Architect: Robert H.H. Hugman
- Constructed by: Works Progress Administration
- Construction end: 1939

Rosita's Bridge, formerly the Arneson River Theater Bridge, is a 37 ft (11 m) bridge on the San Antonio River Walk in San Antonio, Texas. It is named after singer Rosita Fernández and leads to the Arneson River Theater.

== History ==
Rosita's Bridge is one of two original bridges designed by Robert H.H. Hugman for the River Walk. The bridge was built in 1939 by the Works Progress Administration. Rosita Fernández, a noted Tejano singer, would commonly perform at the Arneson River Theater, near the bridge. As a part of her entrance onstage, she would cross the bridge. The bridge soon became known for her performances. The city renamed the bridge in 1992 in her honor.
