= Hans Huckebein =

Hans Huckebein may refer to

- Hans Starcke (1875–1943), who used this as his pen name
- Hans Huckebein, a fictional bird in a short story by Wilhelm Busch, "Hans Huckebein, the Unlucky Raven"
