= State Highway 3-A Bridge at Cibolo Creek =

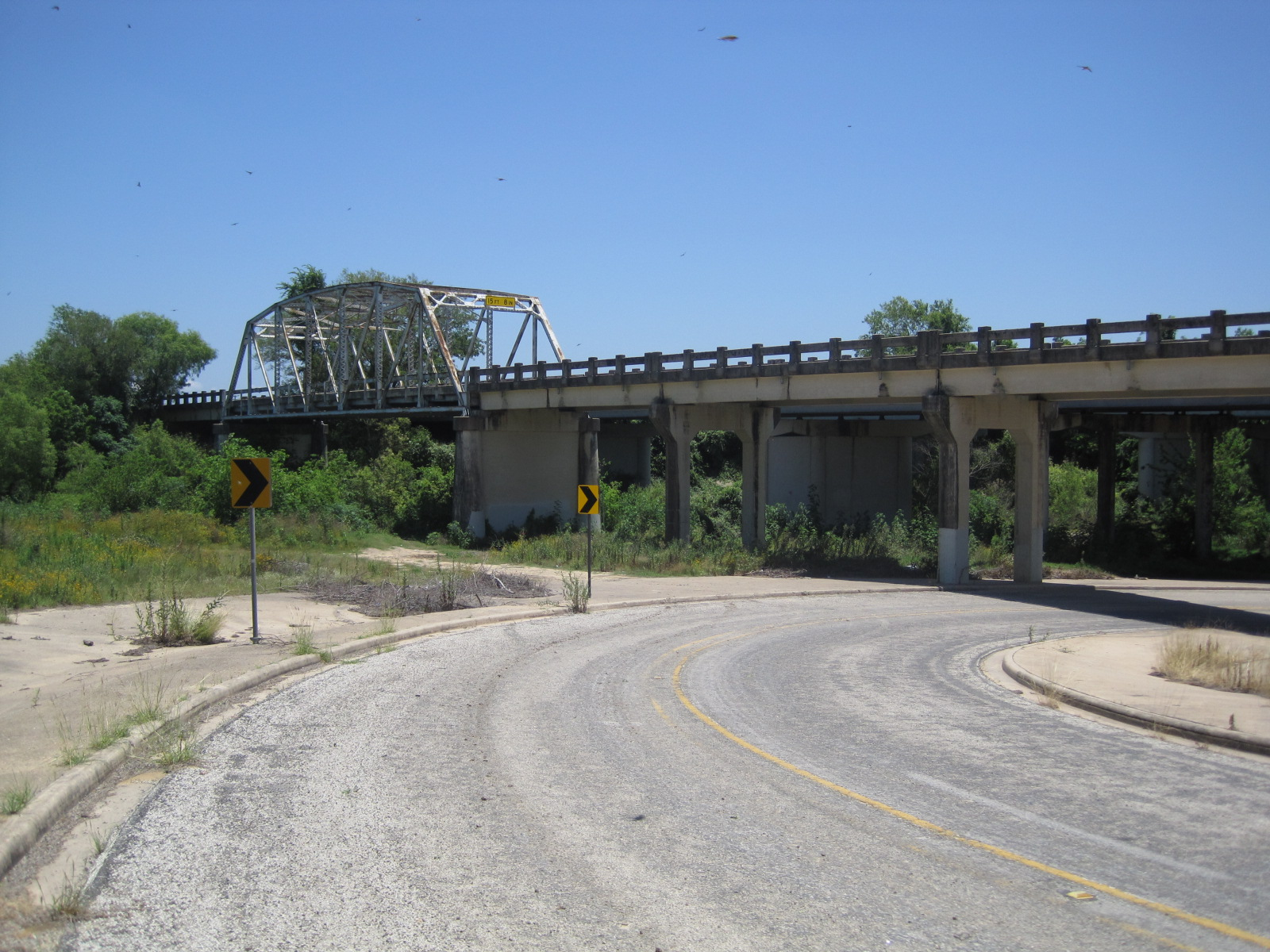
- Texas State Highway 3-A Bridge at Cibolo Creek
- Coordinates: 29°30′05″N 98°11′11″W
- Carries: Interstate 10 north frontage road
- Crosses: Cibolo Creek
- Locale: Schertz, TX
- Owner: State Highway Agency
- Maintained by: State Highway Agency
- ID number: 150150002502011

Characteristics
- Design: Steel Truss - Thru
- Total length: 132.3 metres (434 ft)
- Width: 7.9 metres (26 ft)
- Longest span: 36.6 metres (120 ft)
- Clearance above: 4.83 metres (15.8 ft)

History
- Opened: 1933

Statistics
- Daily traffic: 160
- State Highway 3-A Bridge at Cibolo Creek
- U.S. National Register of Historic Places
- Location within Texas Location within the United States
- Nearest city: Schertz, Texas
- Area: less than one acre
- Built: 1932
- Built by: D.F. Jones Construction Co., Houston Structural Steel Co., et al.
- Architectural style: Parker through truss bridge
- MPS: Historic Bridges of Texas MPS
- NRHP reference No.: 96001112
- Added to NRHP: October 10, 1996

Location
- Interactive map of State Highway 3-A Bridge at Cibolo Creek

Texas State Highway 3-A was one of the first original state highways proposed in 1917.

== History ==
The original northern route of this road had split off at Houston and roughly paralleled it northward through La Grange and ended at San Marcos. By 1919, the route had changed somewhat by moving further north from La Grange through Bastrop and ending in Austin. By 1933, this routing had been renumbered as SH 71.

Illustration of a Parker truss bridge.

Texas State Highway 3-A was reassigned to an alternate routing number of SH 3, which was under construction in Seguin and upon completion would run between San Antonio and Waelder. A Parker through truss bridge was built to cross the Cibolo Creek between Seguin and San Antonio around 1932.

By 1938, the route was limited to the section between Seguin, Texas and Waelder, and in 1939 became the main routing of SH 3 when the original SH 3 was transferred to U.S. Route 90.

== See also ==
- National Register of Historic Places listings in Guadalupe County, Texas
- List of bridges on the National Register of Historic Places in Texas
