= Robert H. H. Hugman =

American architect

Robert H. H. Hugman (February 8, 1902 – July 22, 1980) was an American architect who designed the San Antonio River Walk.

Born in San Antonio as Robert Harvey Harold Hugman, he finished Brackenridge High before graduating from the School of Architecture and Design at the University of Texas at Austin in 1924. He worked in New Orleans from 1924 to 1927. Robert and his wife Martha had a son, Robert Harvey Harold Hugman, Jr, born in 1925 His second wife was Elene Barnby Newman (the widow of Lt. Col. Fred Newman.)

The Vieux Carré Commission, established in New Orleans in 1925, was "a close second" to Charleston as the earliest governmental historic preservation agency in the country, though its powers were only advisory. The efforts to save the Spanish colonial buildings of the French Quarter inspired Hugman to join those seeking to preserve San Antonio's rich architectural heritage when he returned there.

After the city's downtown suffered a series of floods, with the worst in 1921, plans had been proposed to convert that part of the San Antonio River into a paved-over concrete storm sewer. The San Antonio Conservation Society and other civic groups rallied to oppose the idea. In 1929 Hugman introduced a proposal called, "The Shops of Aragon and Romula,” a beautification and flood-control plan for the heart of the city. He kept the proposal alive for seven years, advocating for his vision with elaborate drawings, in private meetings and public speeches.

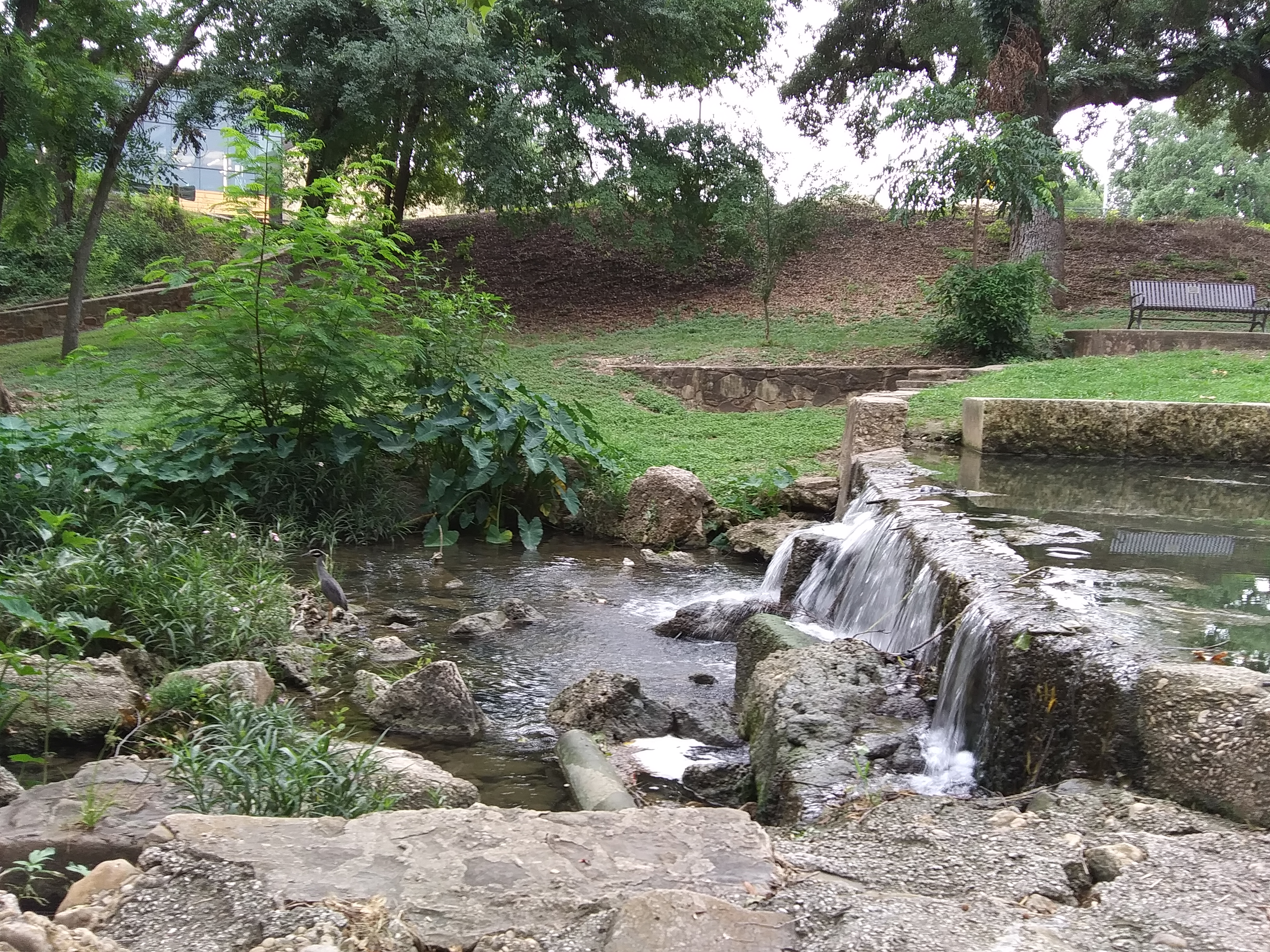
Small water fall at Walnut Springs Park, Seguin, Texas. Park designed by Robert H.H. Hugman architect for the WPA.

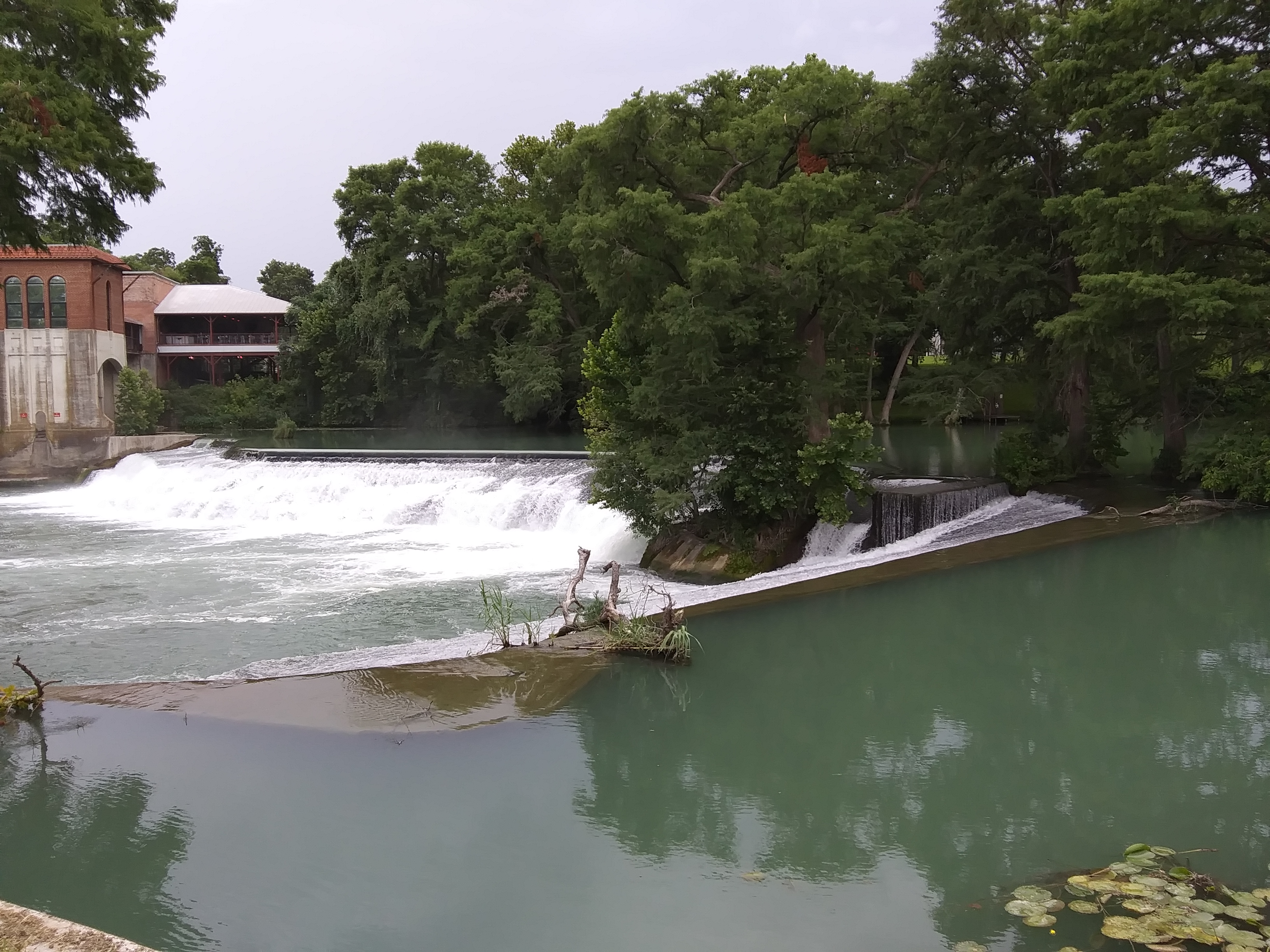
Seguin's Saffold Dam located at the Max Starcke Park was redesigned by Robert H.H. Hugman. Financed largely by the Works Progress Administration, it was built by members of the National Youth Administration.

When private architectural commissions disappeared with the Great Depression, Hugman worked as a planner for public works projects, redesigning Woodlawn Lake, Elmendorf Lake, Concepcion Park, and others, including Walnut Springs Park and Max Starcke Park in Seguin.

His plan for the River Walk was eventually adopted in 1938 when funding became available from the Works Progress Administration. According to biographer Vernon Zunker, Hugman designed 31 unique staircases for the River Walk, along with bridges, water elements, an outdoor theater, and many other features. The bridges were built with high arches to allow gondoliers to pass, as well as floats in the dreamed-for River Parade. Hugman's designs included landscaping, showing where every one of 11,000 trees and shrubs were to go among the existing bald cypress and other native trees.

Edwin Arneson, the WPA's district director and chief engineer had been Hugman's boss was a supporter of the River Walk concept who helped get the needed federal funding. But just as the project was beginning, Arneson found that he had terminal cancer. Arneson River Theater is named in his memory. W.H. Lilly took over as chief engineer and Robert Turk as construction supervisor to finish the project.

In about a year friction developed with the Mayor, Maury Maverick, who earlier, as Congressman had been a key supporter of the River Walk. Hugman later said that the mayor pressed him to appoint a relative as 'landscape architect'. He refused, because the salary would be taken from Hugman's own pay as architect. Meanwhile, Maverick had an adjoining but separate project with the National Youth Administration to restore the historic La Villita neighborhood that bordered part of the river project. When Hugman discovered that material ordered from the River Walk budget was being delivered to La Villita, he took his evidence to confront the River Walk board, and was then fired. Years later in an oral history Hugman said "It was the greatest disappointment of my life".

Hugman set up his own architectural office in what had been basement space just as the River Walk was completed by the WPA in 1941. Later he told of those who said to him, "You'll be drowned like a rat in your own hole".

Today the name "Robert H.H. Hugman" is on the river level facade of the Clifford Building at the corner of Commerce Street and South Alamo.

After he lost his job with the River Walk, Hugman continued to give his time to the chief engineer, W.H. Lilly, and to Robert Turk, the construction supervisor, to help them follow his plans. In the years following, Hugman did work for the military, and his private practice included some residences in San Antonio, and Kenedy. From 1957 until 1972 he worked as an architect at Randolph Air Force Base, on the edge of the city.

Hugman's reputation began to recover when HemisFair '68, the city's international exposition, brought worldwide attention to the River Walk's unique beauty. Then the bell tower at the Arneson stage was named for him, and in 1978 he was invited to be the first to ring its new bells, just two years before his death. A bridge over the river was named for him, and today several plaques along the River Walk honor his vision as the "Father of the River Walk.".

Before his River Walk work, Hugman had also designed the original Walnut Springs Park in nearby Seguin, Texas, which has been partly reworked after years of neglect. Features of that park, such as the stone retaining walls and low dams with stepping stones between the overflowing water, foreshadowed elements seen in the River Walk.

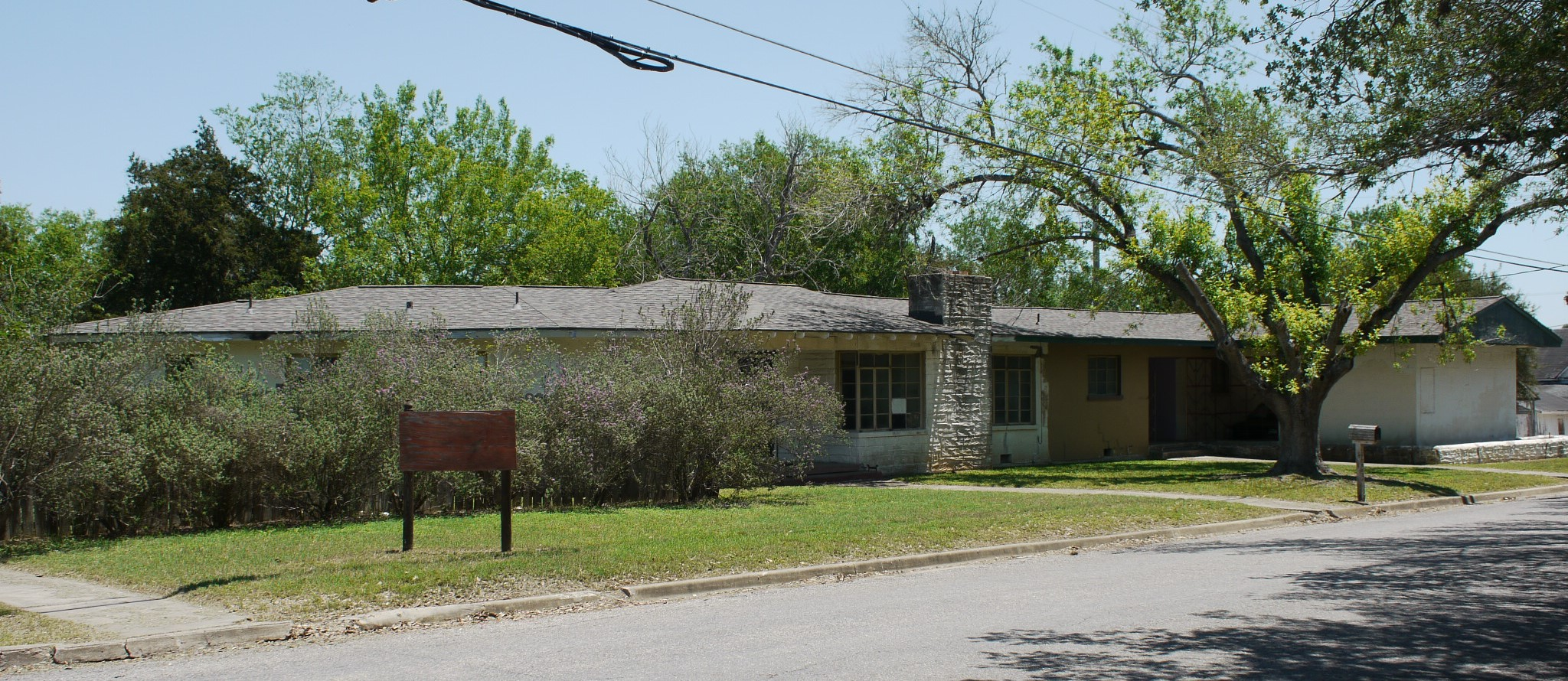
Hugman Silber Architects home in Kenedy, TX

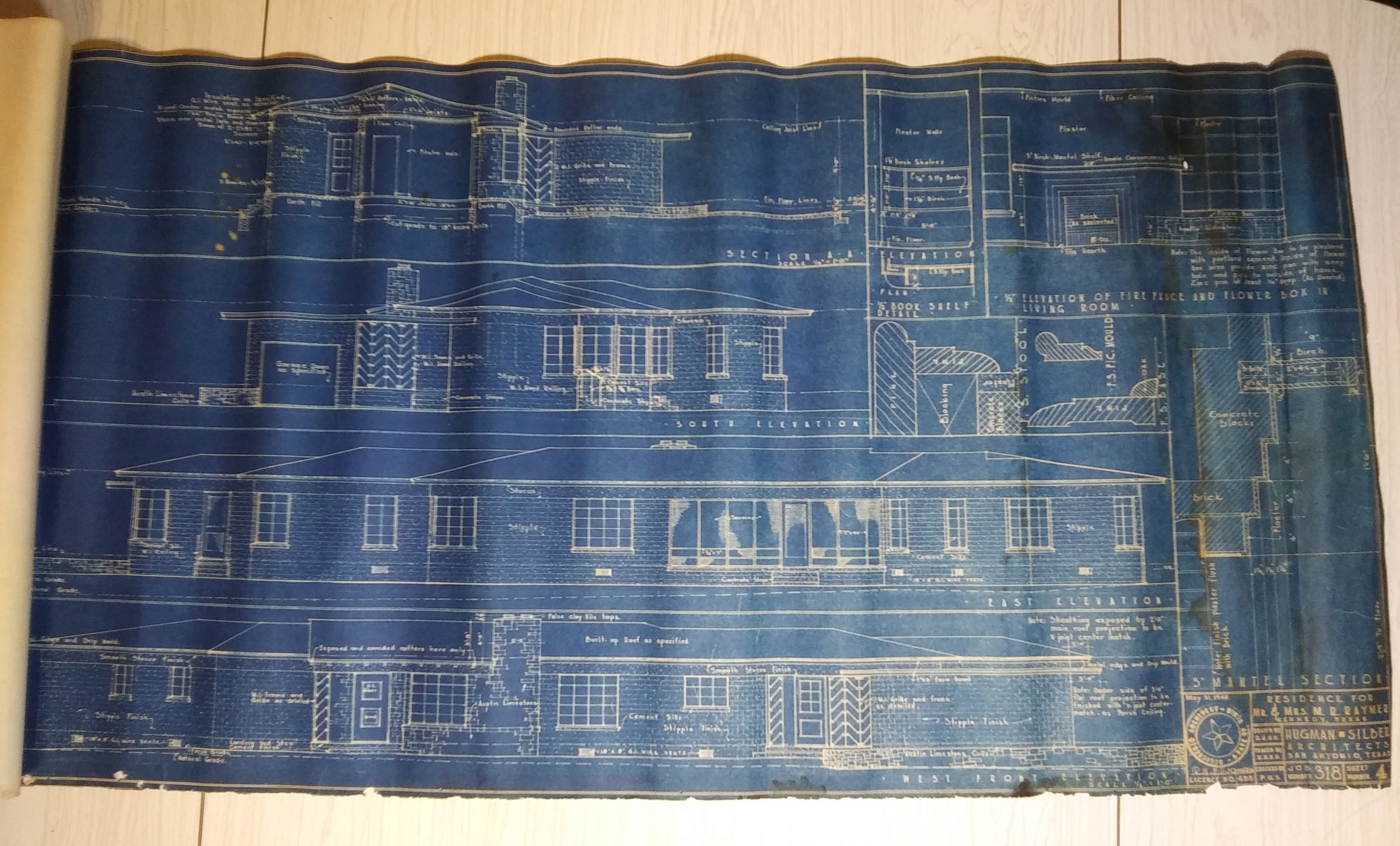
Hugman-Silber Architects blueprints for residence in Kenedy, Texas.

And Hugman designed Seguin's Max Starcke Park, built by the National Youth Administration and dedicated in 1938—before work began on the River Walk. He was the architect of the Art Deco style Recreation Building there,. The park includes a redesign of the old Saffold Dam across the Guadalupe River.
