= Los Nogales =

- U.S. National Register of Historic Places
- Recorded Texas Historic Landmark
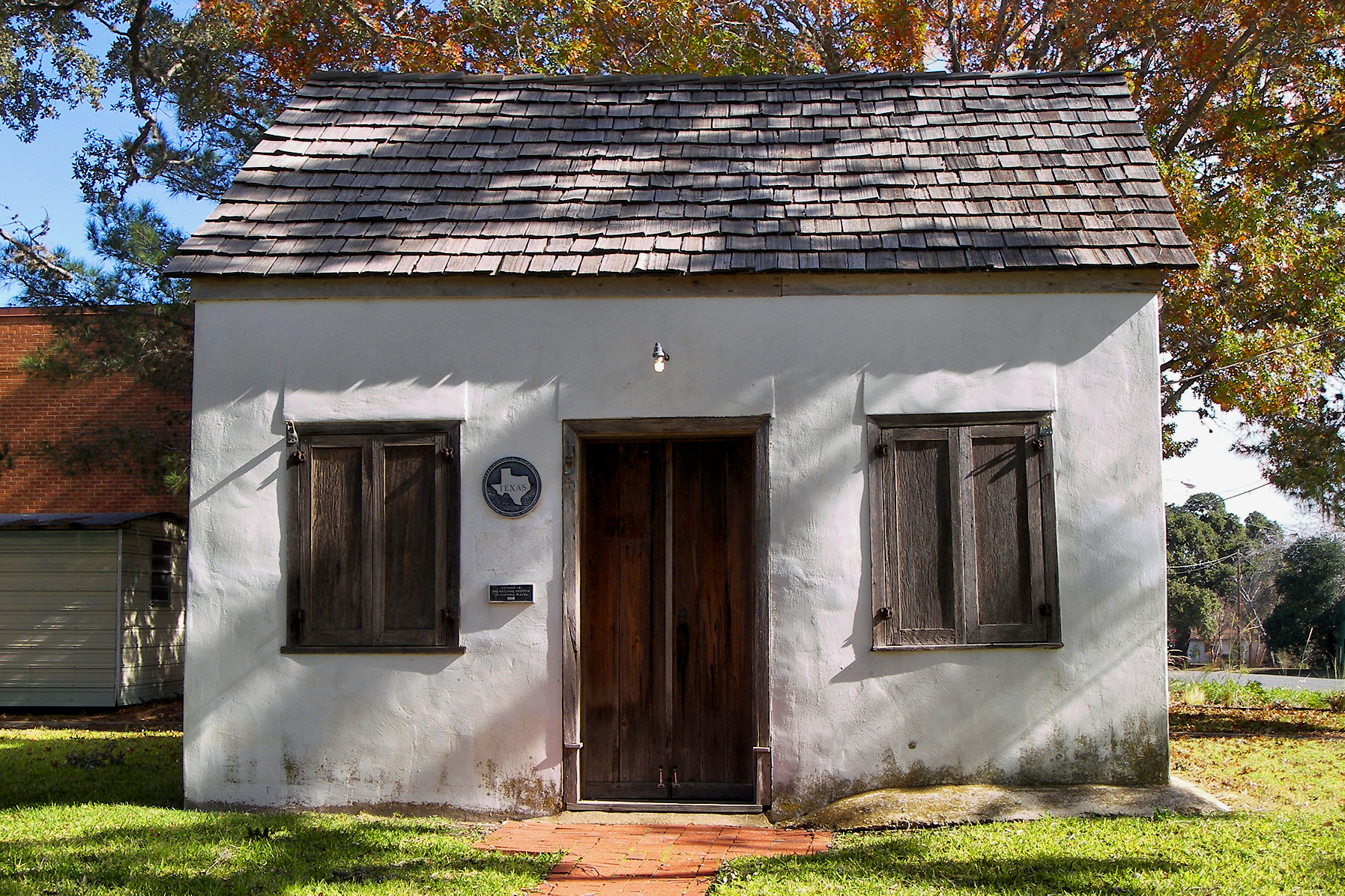
- Los Nogales in 2012.

- Location within Texas Location within the United States
- Location: S. River and E. Live Oak Sts., Seguin, Texas
- Coordinates: 29°33′57″N 97°57′47″W
- Area: 2 acres (0.81 ha)
- Built: 1765
- NRHP reference No.: 72001365
- RTHL No.: 3128

Significant dates
- Added to NRHP: March 24, 1972
- Designated RTHL: 1989

Los Nogales is a historic 1800s home, among the oldest structures still standing in Seguin, Texas and is the last remaining adobe constructed home in the city. It serves the community as a museum.

== History ==
The old home was originally built in 1849 for Justus Gombert. Although restored, it retains its original hand-made, sun-dried adobe home construction and cypress shingle roof. It was owned in 1859 by Joseph Zorn and in 1870, Benjamin McCulloch took possession of the house. This building is an example of a primitive home with its pioneer style kitchen and sod hewn cellar.

In 1951, the citizens of Seguin formed together to save and restore the old home and from this project was born the Seguin Conservation Society.

The first Seguin Post Office was located on the same property as the Los Nogales museum. Senator Juan Seguin helped establish a mail route to Seguin and Los Nogales, hence the building was previously referred to as the "Juan Seguin Post Office". The tree-top mail office was quite unique as it was operated from an old tree-house.

On March 24, 1972, the old building was placed on the National Register of Historic Places.

== Museum ==
Los Nogales currently serves the community as a museum and is home to many local historical artifacts. The museum is occasionally open for tours.

== See also ==
- National Register of Historic Places listings in Guadalupe County, Texas
- Recorded Texas Historic Landmarks in Guadalupe County
