= Arneson River Theater =

Open-air theatre in San Antonio, Texas, United States

Coordinates: 29.422°N 98.489°W

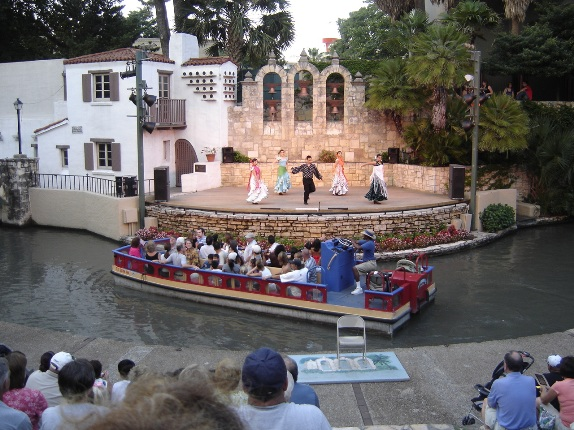
The Arneson River Theater routinely features local acts that draw large crowds throughout the year.

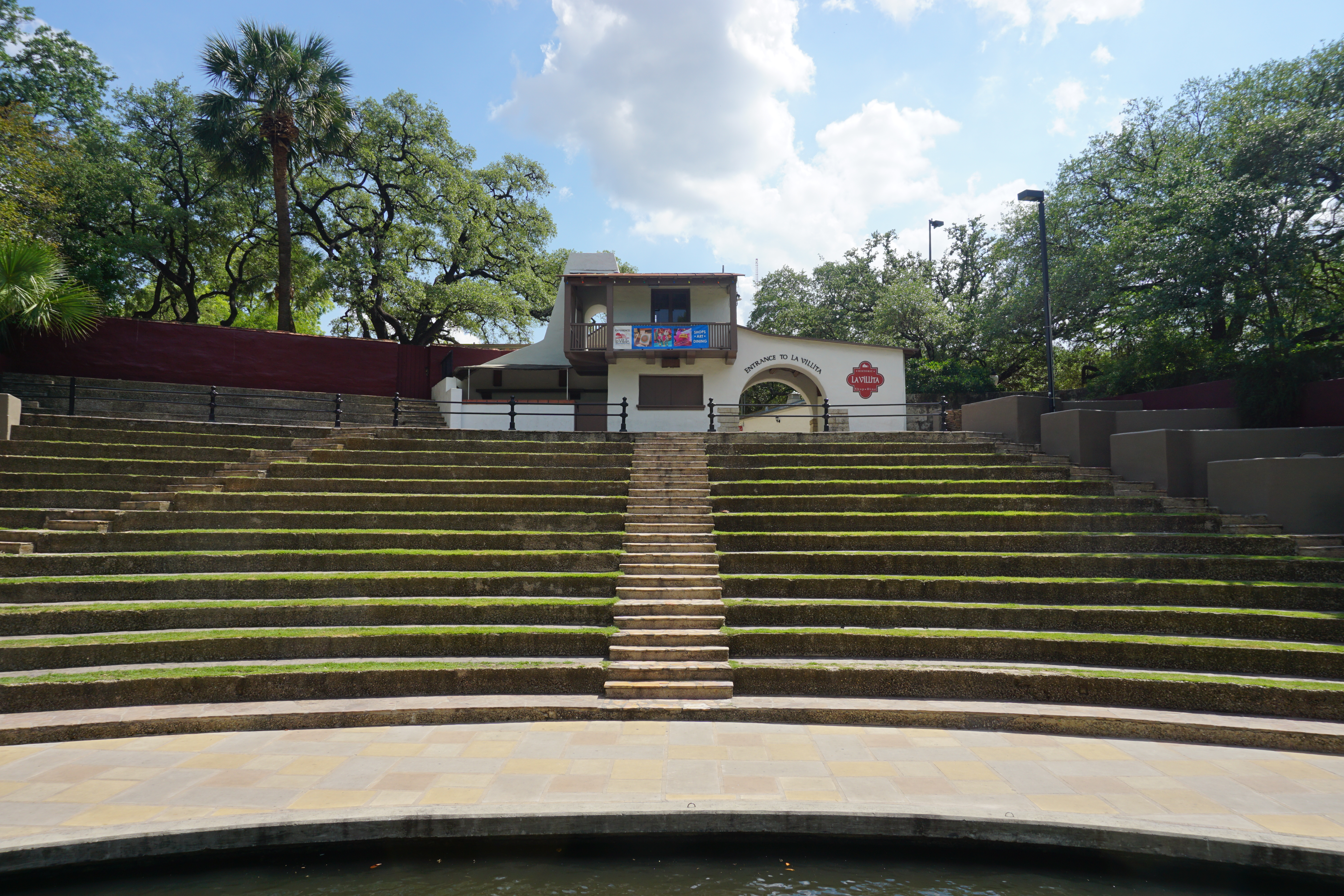
Arneson River Theater seating

Arneson River Theater is an outdoor performance theater located on the San Antonio River Walk in the U.S. state of Texas.

The open-air venue was erected 1939–1941 by the Works Progress Administration. The design was supervised by architect Robert H.H. Hugman. It is named after Edwin P. Arneson, the regional engineer for the W.P.A. who was instrumental in securing funding for the Paseo del Rio. Arneson died before construction began. Many years later bells were added to arches behind the stage that Hugman had designed, and they were named for him. In a belated ceremony, the "Father of the River Walk" struck the bells for the first time, two years before his death.

The stage is on the north side of river; the audience sits on the grass-covered steps on the south side, which can hold over 800 people on 13 rows of seats. A nearby stone bridge is often made part of the performance space. It is now called Rosita's Bridge in honor of Rosita Fernández, a pioneer of Tejano music, who performed here as star of the summer-long Fiesta Noche del Rio for 25 years. The theater continues to be used throughout the year for a wide variety of performances averaging over 200 each year including folkloric groups, festivals, music concerts, plays, dance, opera, and even weddings. Many of the river parades held throughout the year are televised from this unique open-air amphitheater.

Above and behind the seating area is La Villita Historic Arts Village, a restoration of San Antonio's oldest residential neighborhood, today filled with artisan shops, galleries, and restaurants.

The theater, along with several other San Antonio landmarks, was featured in the popular 2000 comedy film Miss Congeniality, starring Sandra Bullock and Michael Caine.

== See also ==
- La Villita
