= National Register of Historic Places listings in Guadalupe County, Texas =

Location of Guadalupe County in Texas

This is a list of the National Register of Historic Places listings in Guadalupe County, Texas.

This is intended to be a complete list of properties and districts listed on the National Register of Historic Places in Guadalupe County, Texas. There are two districts and 12 individual properties listed on the National Register in the county. Two individually listed properties are State Antiquities Landmarks including one along with five other properties that are designated Recorded Texas Historic Landmarks. One district includes an additional Recorded Texas Historic Landmark.

This National Park Service list is complete through NPS recent listings posted March 21, 2025.

== Current listings ==
The publicly disclosed locations of National Register properties and districts may be seen in a mapping service provided.

	Name on the Register	Image	Date listed	Location	City or town	Description
1	Dublin Plantation	Dublin Plantation	December 11, 2013 (#13000918)	3135 Cottonwood Creek Road; 29°42′15″N 97°46′58″W	Kingsbury vicinity	Recorded Texas Historic Landmark
2	Erskine House No. 1	Erskine House No. 1	August 25, 1970 (#70000750)	902 N. Austin St. 29°34′01″N 97°57′51″W	Seguin	Recorded Texas Historic Landmark
3	Robert Hall House	Robert Hall House	October 25, 1979 (#79002949)	214 S. Travis St. 29°34′03″N 97°58′00″W	Seguin	
4	Hardscramble	Hardscramble	July 6, 2011 (#11000424)	1806 Tschoepe Rd. 29°38′04″N 97°52′52″W	Seguin vicinity	
5	Joseph F. Johnson House	Joseph F. Johnson House	June 23, 1978 (#78002940)	761 Johnson Ave. 29°33′49″N 97°58′26″W	Seguin	
6	King-Woods Farmstead	King-Woods Farmstead	April 2, 2018 (#100002268)	920 E Court St. 29°34′10″N 97°57′15″W	Seguin	
7	Los Nogales	Los Nogales	March 24, 1972 (#72001365)	S. River and E. Live Oak Sts. 29°33′57″N 97°57′47″W	Seguin	Recorded Texas Historic Landmark
8	Park Hotel	Park Hotel	May 23, 1980 (#80004124)	217 S. River St. 29°34′02″N 97°57′49″W	Seguin	
9	Saffold Dam	Saffold Dam	November 15, 1979 (#79002950)	Off TX 123; 29°33′03″N 97°58′12″W	Seguin	State Antiquities Landmark
10	Sebastopol	Sebastopol	August 25, 1970 (#70000751)	NE corner of W. Court and N. Erkel Sts. 29°34′12″N 97°58′21″W	Seguin	State Antiquities Landmark, Recorded Texas Historic Landmark
11	Seguin Commercial Historic District	Seguin Commercial Historic District	December 15, 1983 (#83003773); August 14, 2013 boundary increase (#03000768)	Roughly bounded by Camp, Myrtle, Washington, and Crockett Sts. 29°34′13″N 97°57′51″W	Seguin	Includes Recorded Texas Historic Landmark; 70 buildings, 1 structure, 1875-1949; boundary increase in 2013 added 9 buildings.
12	State Highway 3-A Bridge at Cibolo Creek	State Highway 3-A Bridge at Cibolo Creek	October 10, 1996 (#96001112)	I-10 at the Bexar and Guadalupe Cnty. line 29°30′05″N 98°11′11″W	Schertz	Extends into Bexar County
13	Sweet Home Vocational and Agricultural High School	Sweet Home Vocational and Agricultural High School	November 19, 1998 (#98001417)	10 mi (16 km). S of Seguin on Sweet Home Rd. 29°27′40″N 98°02′21″W	Seguin	Recorded Texas Historic Landmark
14	Edward and Texanna Tewes House	Edward and Texanna Tewes House	January 9, 1997 (#96001566)	8280 Linne Rd. 29°28′03″N 98°06′11″W	Seguin	Recorded Texas Historic Landmark
15	Wilson Utility Pottery Kilns Archeological District	Wilson Utility Pottery Kilns Archeological District	April 16, 1975 (#75001987)	Address restricted	Capote	Roadside historical marker located outside district

== See also ==
- National Register of Historic Places listings in Texas
- Recorded Texas Historic Landmarks in Guadalupe County
