= Fiesta Noche del Rio =

Outdoor performance in San Antonio, Texas

Coordinates: 29.4222°N 98.4886°W

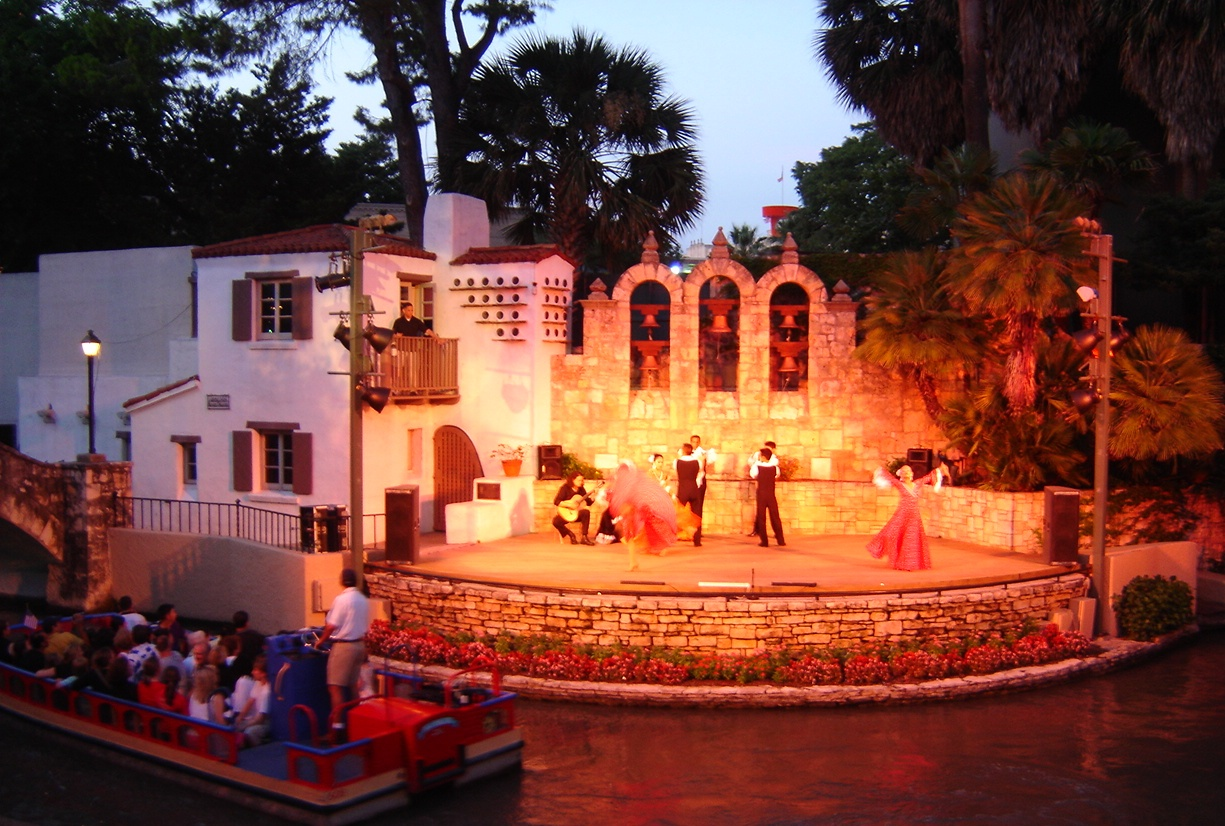
The 2007 season

Fiesta Noche del Rio is a seasonal outdoor performance in San Antonio, Texas which features the songs and dances of Mexico, Spain, Argentina, and the U.S. states of California and Texas.

The performance venue is the Arneson River Theater in the San Antonio River Walk. The festival has been in operation since 1957, making it the oldest outdoor performance in the United States.

The current director and choreographer of the seven act flamenco and folklorico performance is Kathleen Rodriguez Hall.

Elizabeth Sanchez-Lopez, who was the dance coordinator for the 1993 US Olympic Festival was the director and choreographer from 1991-2018.
