= Walnut Springs Park =

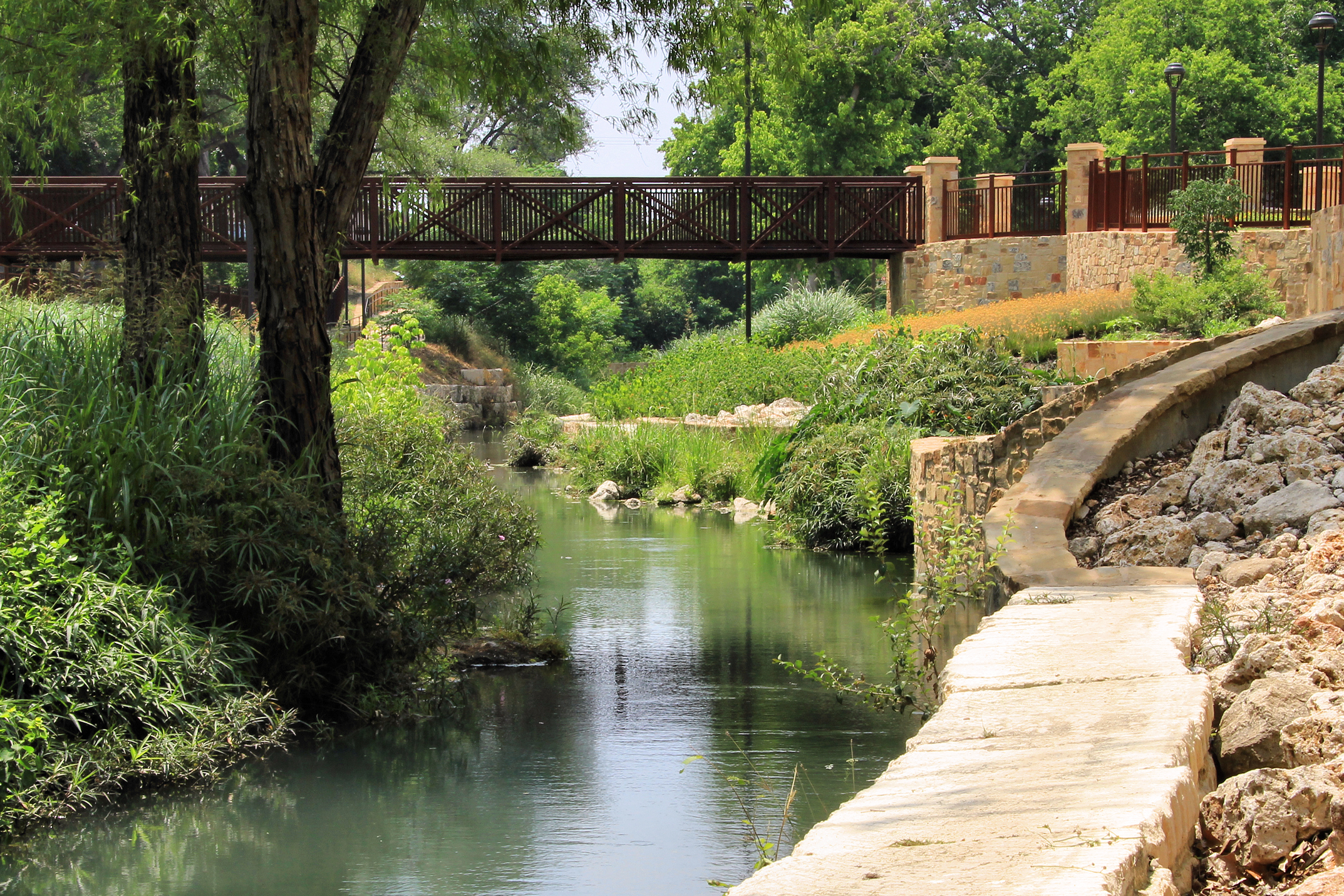

Location
- Country: United States
- State: Texas

Physical characteristics
- Source
  - location: Seguin, Texas
  - coordinates: 29°34′05″N 97°58′06″W
  - elevation: 164 m (538 ft)
- Mouth

Walnut Springs Park (also known as the Walnut Branch Walk) in Seguin, Texas is a network of walkways and bridges along the banks of Walnut Branch, a small tributary of the Guadalupe River. The stream is fed by various small springs. The main one near Court St. was filled in for parking, but the water still trickles out from the beneath the fill.

The park is an important part of the city's urban fabric and a historic attraction in its own right.

== History ==
The town of Seguin was founded in 1838 just a few blocks from the springs. Many of the earliest and then some of the best homes erected in the 19th century were along Walnut Branch, which provided clean water for animals, laundry, and cleaning. Sebastopol House State Historic Site is one of several early concrete homes surviving from before the Civil War.

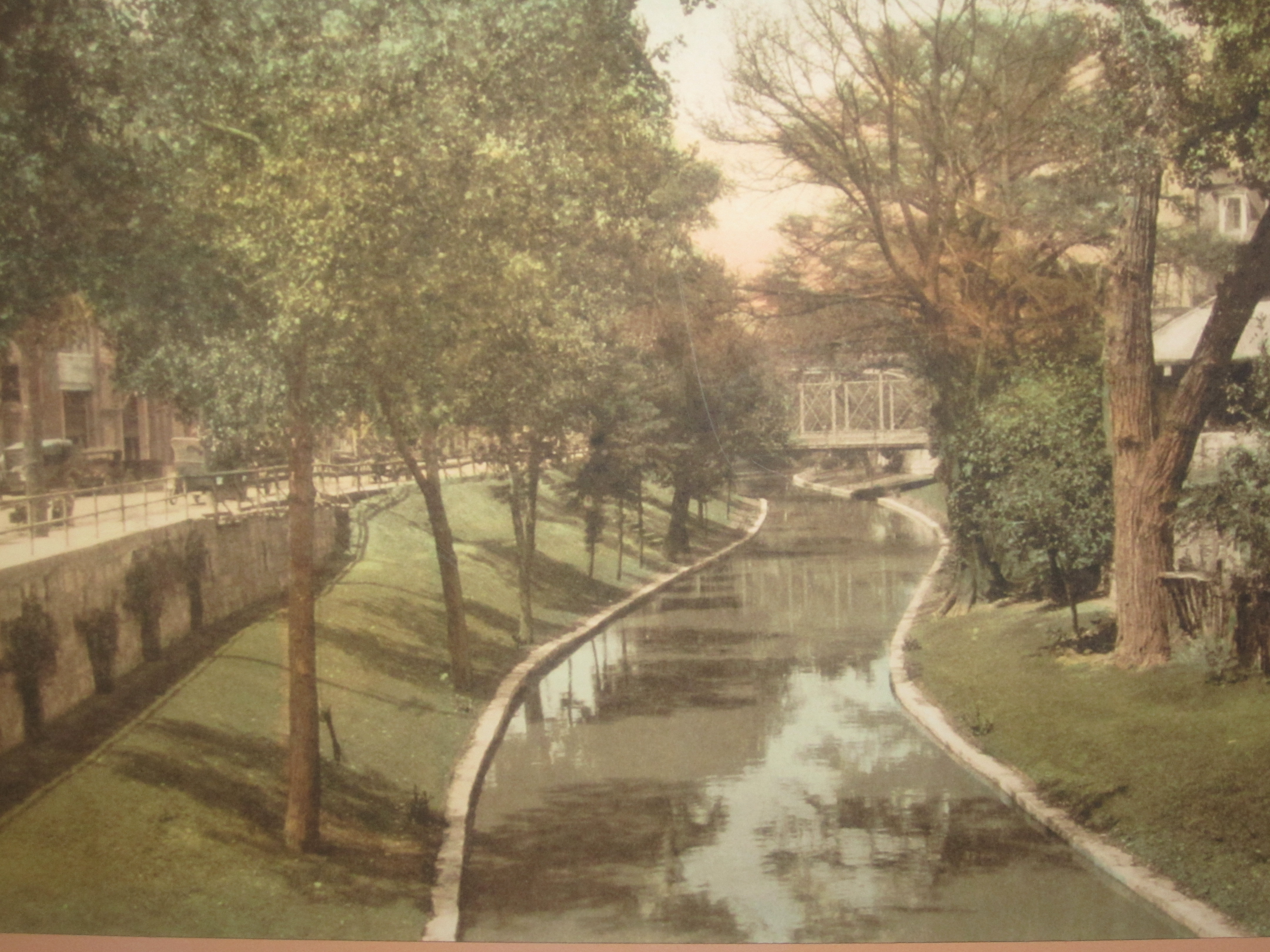
The early design of Robert Hugman

In the late 1920s, plans for a park came into play under Seguin's Mayor Max Starcke. San Antonio native and environmental architect Robert Hugman submitted his ideas for what would become Walnut Springs Park.

Federal depression-relief funds became available in the spring of 1933 to beautify the stream and create a park. The project was planned by Hugman, the architect who later designed the San Antonio River Walk, which was completed by the Works Progress Administration in 1941. Hugman was also the designer of Max Starcke Park, Seguin's much larger park along the Guadalupe River, which was built by the National Youth Administration and dedicated in 1938. Many of the elements seen in the River Walk were given tryouts along Walnut Branch and in Starcke Park.

In June 1933, workmen from the Civilian Conservation Corps, which had a small camp south of town, began building walkways and bridges along Walnut Branch and lining the slopes of the waterway with curving stone retaining walls. Dams crossed by stepping stones, low falls, and quiet pools were built along the natural course of the waterway that passes along the edge of the city's downtown. The former stagecoach route was also marked with stone walls, from Market Street (now Donegan) to Market Street (now Nolte). Landscaping was minimal, due to the native trees in place and the natural beauty of the location, but included ferns, elephant ears, and umbrella plants, which like boggy soil. Most of the park is about two stories lower than the streets of downtown, which with the humidity from the flowing stream and shade from the tree canopy creates its own microclimate.

== Neglect and Decay ==
The park eventually fell into neglect during the severe drought in the 1950s, though the main spring never dried up. Fear that breeding mosquitoes in the small ponds could possibly spread polio led to the demolition of the stepping stone dams along the waterway. City officials lost interest in maintaining the area, and it became overgrown with weeds and weed trees, creating an environment much more welcoming to snakes and vermin than to park users. With the flow of the waters limited and the loss of the beautiful falls and pools, the area would be almost forgotten in the decades following. Most of the land had remained privately owned in large part, and as land values rose, some owners reasserted their claims and put up buildings or parking lots in what had been parkland. As the final blow, the United States Army Corps of Engineers channelized much of the upstream course, bulldozing oaks to straighten it and speed the flow of runoff, which dumped more floodwater on the lower section.

== Revitalization ==
However, during the 1980s, ideas to revitalize the area began to flourish. The Women's Federated Clubs and the Seguin Garden Club took the first steps and began planting roses and climbing roses along the walls marking the stagecoach route in the area along Donegan and Travis Streets, which became known as the Memorial Rose Garden. The community holds a romantic Moonlight and Roses Festival at the site annually, in late spring.

Then in 1995, the city formed a master plan for renovation. By 2002, voters had approved the initiation of the project. However, delays in funding postponed major renovations until 2006, when funds from the Destination Seguin bond package were approved by voters, and used in part to buy key land parcels as part of the park. The project was brought to the attention of State and Federal officials for help with funding. The Army Corps of Engineers formed the basic plan of design for the park, attempting to rectify the earlier damage, since the Corps' philosophy of flood control had completely reversed to emphasize natural plantings and wetlands to absorb runoff, and meandering stream beds to slow rushing waters.

On May 14, 2011, the central section of the park was completed and the city celebrated the rebirth of Walnut Springs Park. Commemorative plaques mounted to the entrances on the park's pedestrian bridge were placed to honor the contributions of the people who made this project possible.

== Expansion ==
Current plans are to extend the park walk, deemed the Walnut Branch Linear Park Trail, much further north to Highway 78, and a few blocks south to Convent Street, and perhaps eventually a few more blocks to link with Max Starcke Park.

== A Legacy Park ==
In 2012, a ceremony was held by the Texas Recreation and Park Society, which presented an award to Seguin's Parks and Recreation Department that designated Walnut Springs Park as a Lone Star Legacy Park.

== See also ==
- List of rivers of Texas
