= Max Starcke =

American politician

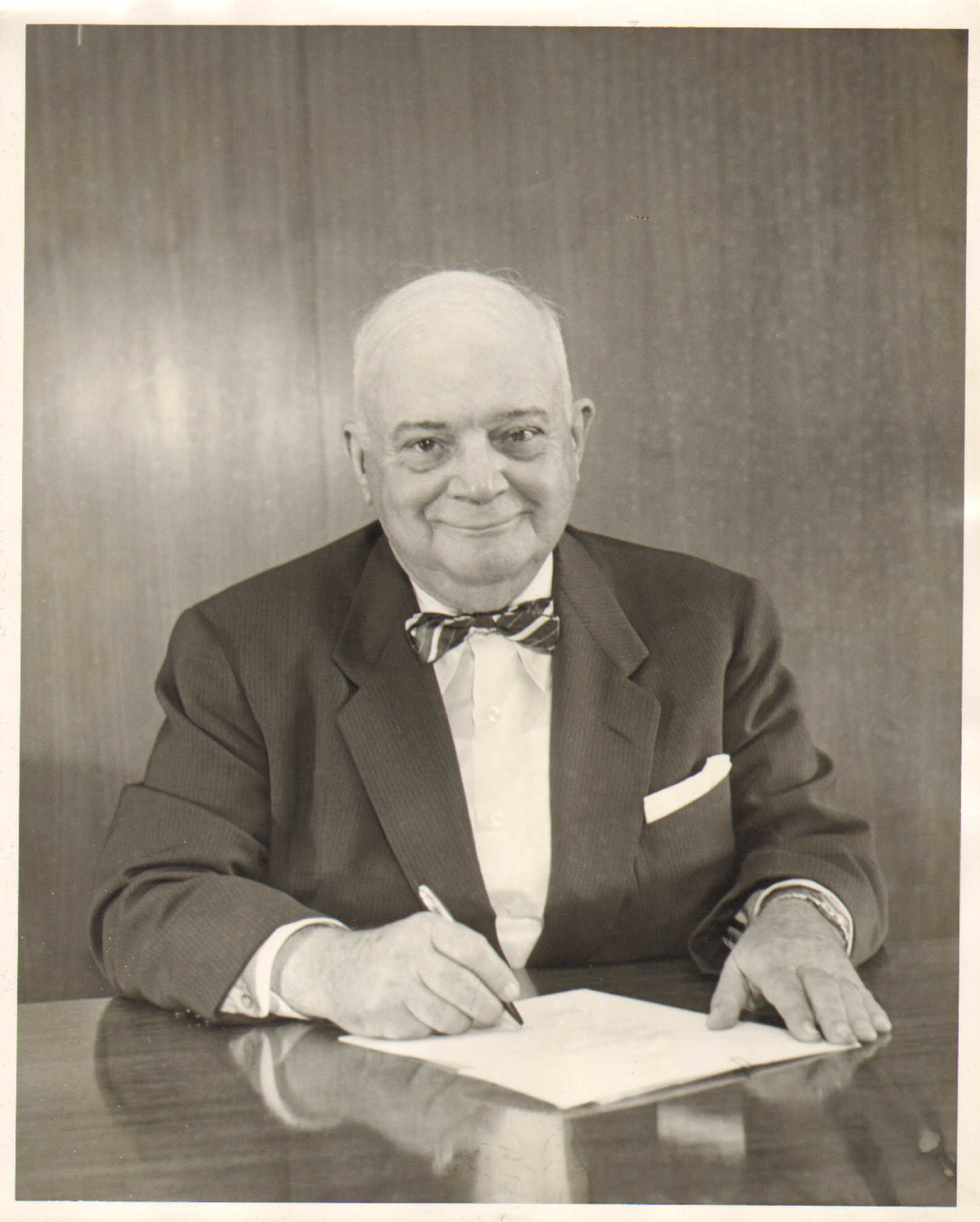
Maximilian Hugo "Max" Starcke Mayor of Seguin, Texas, from 1928 to 1938 Managing Director of the Lower Colorado River Authority from 1940 to 1955.

Maximilian Hugo "Max" Starcke (November 11, 1884 – June 29, 1972) was a businessman and then a government official in Texas for 37 years, first as Mayor of Seguin, Texas, from 1928 to 1938 and then as Managing Director of the Lower Colorado River Authority from 1940 to 1955.

Born and raised on a farm in the York's Creek area about 12 miles north of Seguin, Max Starcke was the son of Hugo and Ida (Eberhard) Starcke, and the grandson of German immigrants. He attended Seguin public schools, then Texas A&M University and a San Antonio business college.

Starcke married Meta Blumberg of Seguin in 1908, and they had two daughters, Lucile and Maxine, before her death in 1938. In 1940 he married Evelyn Quinn of Ackerman, Mississippi, and they had one daughter.

== Businessman and Civic Leader ==
In 1906 he clerked in the law office of state senator Joseph B. Dibrell of Seguin. Starcke also worked as a real estate developer, then established a funeral home, and helped organize Farmer’s State Bank in Seguin. From 1917 to 1938, Starcke worked as a bank officer, first in Farmer's, then at Seguin State Bank & Trust after it took over the smaller bank.

After helping to revive the local Chamber of Commerce, he headed its effort to recruit the Chicago White Sox for two seasons of spring training in Seguin, in 1922 and 1923. He also served as president of the South Texas Chamber of Commerce. He was active in the Texas League of Municipalities (later the Texas Municipal League) and served as its president in 1934.

== Mayor for 10 years ==
Starcke was an alderman from 1909 to 1912, before being elected mayor in 1928 and re-elected for five terms.

He was a dynamic, successful, and highly popular mayor. Not long after he took office, in 1929, the Darst Creek Oil Field came in, about 15 miles east of Seguin. The resulting oil boom carried the town through the worst years of the Depression, as local stores sold supplies and residents rented out rooms to the oil patch workers. The local taxes collected were used to match federal grants for make-work projects that created jobs when the oil rush subsided.

Toward the end of his service as mayor, Starcke totaled up the trophies that had transformed his hometown, including the city's first water-filtration plant, a new post office, a new municipal building, a new courthouse, a new jail, new storm sewers and sidewalks, a fountain in the town square, a small park built by the Civilian Conservation Corps along the banks of a stream fed by Walnut Springs, and a park that stretched for a mile along the beautiful Guadalupe River. Also three swimming pools: one for Anglos in the new park, one for blacks at William Ball High School, and one at Juan Seguin School for the Tejanos.

Seguin's new show-place park was designed by Robert H.H. Hugman, now famed for his River Walk in San Antonio. Financed largely by the Works Progress Administration, it was built by members of the National Youth Administration. Besides the fine swimming pool, it boasted a golf course, picnic tables and bar-be-que pits along a scenic river drive, a pavilion for parties, a Recreation Building with a rooftop space for dancing under the stars. It was named Max Starcke Park in his honor, and dedicated in 1938, his last year as mayor.

During his years as bank officer and Mayor, Starcke bought a small rent house less than two blocks from his workplaces. He hired the Seguin-born architect Marvin Eichenroht to almost double its size behind a handsome Spanish colonial revival exterior of white stone. His yard protected a towering live oak known as the Charter Oak, where the first property owners had signed his hometown's founding document a hundred years before.

== At the L.C.R.A. ==
In 1938, Starcke was hired as the first operations manager of the Lower Colorado River Authority, and he moved to Austin. The authority was constructing several hydroelectric dams that form what are known today as the Highland Lakes.

Starcke's chief responsibility was to sell the electricity generated by the LCRA, and at the urging of then-Congressman Lyndon Johnson, to make it as inexpensive as possible to poor consumers. Starke led the efforts to sign up cities and towns as new customers, at rates usually half what they had been paying. At the same time, the LCRA built transmission lines to carry the power into distant areas, which came to be served by rural electric coops organized under laws that Franklin Roosevelt got through Congress. These efforts brought light and power to many thousands of rural homes in Central Texas and the Hill Country.

In 1940, Starcke was promoted to general manager of the LCRA in Austin, a position he held until December 31, 1955. Under his leadership the authority built two more dams for hydroelectric power on the Colorado River, using proceeds from revenue bonds. The LCRA extended its services to 33 cities and 11 rural electric coops over a 41,000-square-mile area.

Again at the urging of Lyndon Johnson, in the late 1940s, not long after World War II ended, Starcke led the LCRA into an extensive soil conservation effort. The LCRA ran education programs, loaned equipment to poor farmers, and established "example farms". The effort wound down in the 1950s as the federal government began a nationwide program of soil conservation.

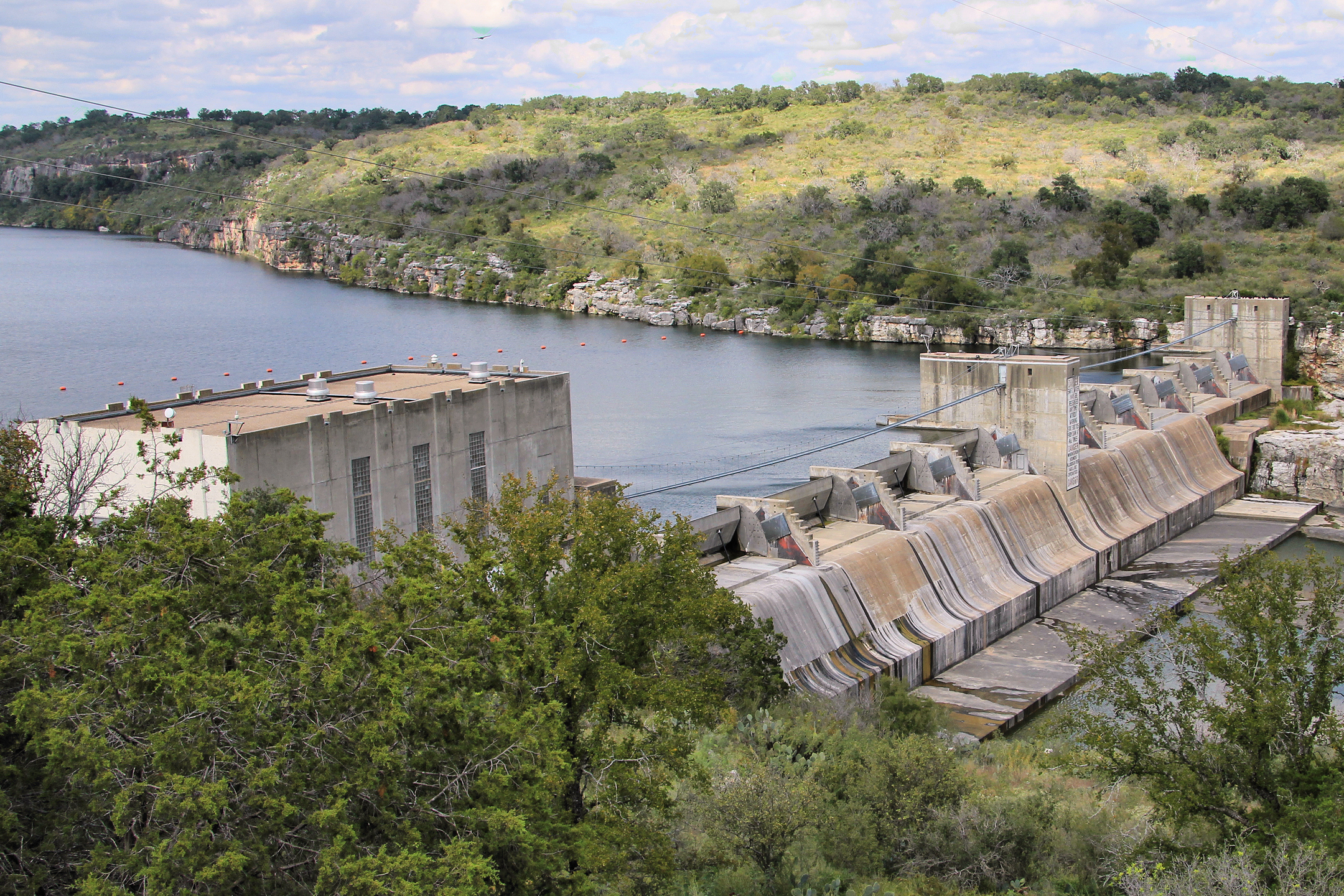
Max Starcke Dam near Marble Falls.

After his retirement in 1955, Starcke worked as a paid consultant to LCRA for another 10 years, and was president of the Texas Water Conservation Association from 1957 to 1962.

In 1962 the LCRA dam near Marble Falls was renamed Max Starcke Dam. In 1966 Silurian outcrops near Llano, not previously recorded in Central Texas, were named Starcke Limestone in his honor.

A natural salesman and a gregarious politician, Starcke was active in the Elks, the Masons, the Lions, the Rotary, and the Sons of Hermann, as well as serving as a deacon at the University Presbyterian Church in Austin.
