= Hans Starcke =

German artist and poet (1875–1943)

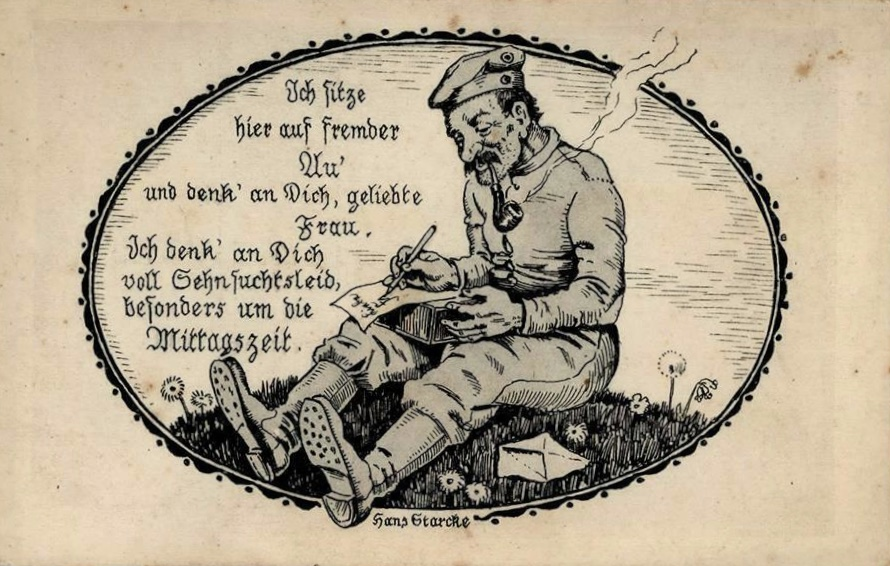
"I sit here on a foreign field", c. 1917

Karl Albert Hans Starcke (15 June 1875 – 18 December 1943) was a German landscape artist, illustrator, and writer of verse.

As a writer, he worked under the pen-name of Hans Huckebein, adopting the name of a character in the story "Hans Huckebein, the Unlucky Raven", by Wilhelm Busch.

== Life ==
Starcke was born into a merchant family in Jena, the seat of the University of Jena, and had six siblings. He trained as an artist at the Grand-Ducal Saxon Art School, Weimar, and in 1896 submitted a doctoral thesis to the University of Strasbourg called "Über einen künstlichen Abort bei einem infantilen rachitischen Zwergbecken" ('On an artificial miscarriage in an infantile rachitic dwarf pelvis').

Starcke lived for many years in Kaufbeuren and Allstedt, where his brother Paul Starcke worked in a pharmacy. From 1906 onwards, he was listed in Jena directories as a painter.

His creative output was diverse, paintings, illustrations, postcards, and poetry. His first poems were published in 1911 in the Jenaische Zeitung under the name of Hans Huckebein. In 1918, his volume of verse Fröhliche Verse ("Happy Verses") by Hans Huckebein was published by Robert Peitz in Camburg.

Starcke painted scenes in and around Jena and donated many such works to the Jena City Museum, where they were destroyed during the Allied strategic bombing of Jena in the Second World War.

At the age of 52, Starcke married Marie Kittel, who was younger by nearly twenty years. He died in Jena in 1943.

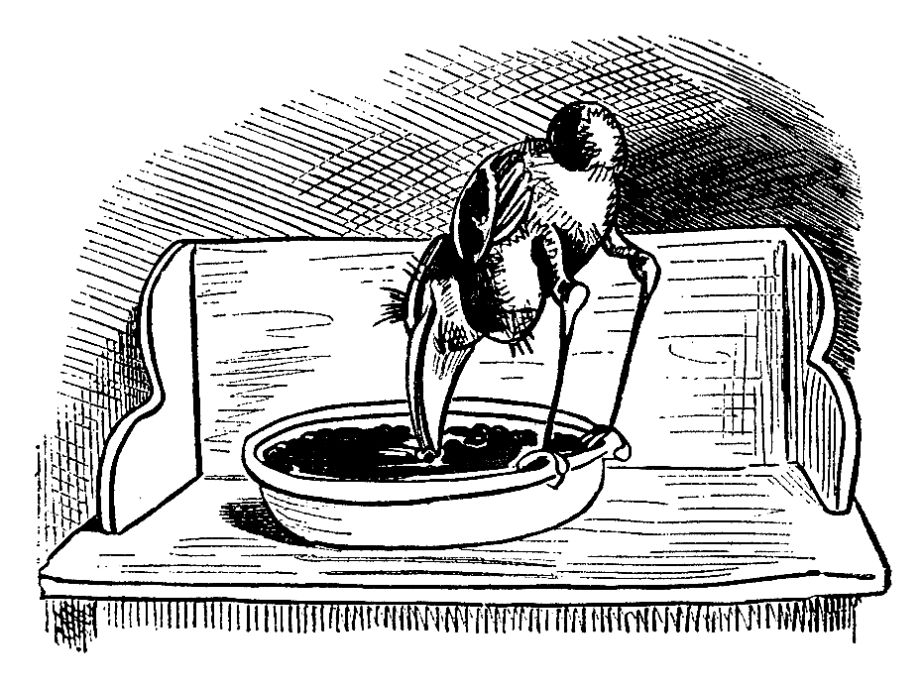
"Hans Huckebein", by Wilhelm Busch

== Gallery ==
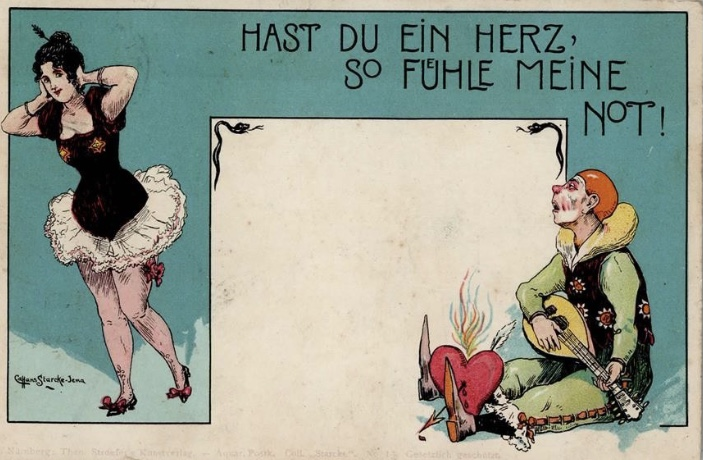
"If you have a heart", c. 1900

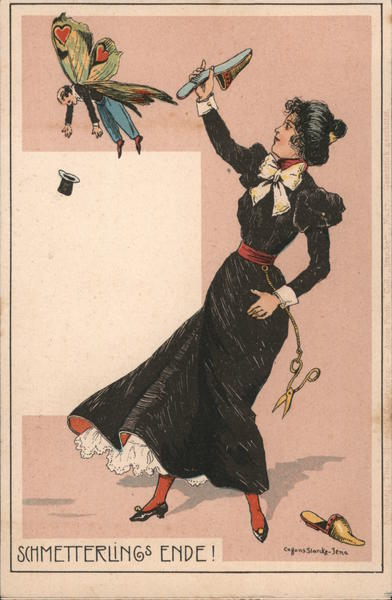
"Butterfly's End"

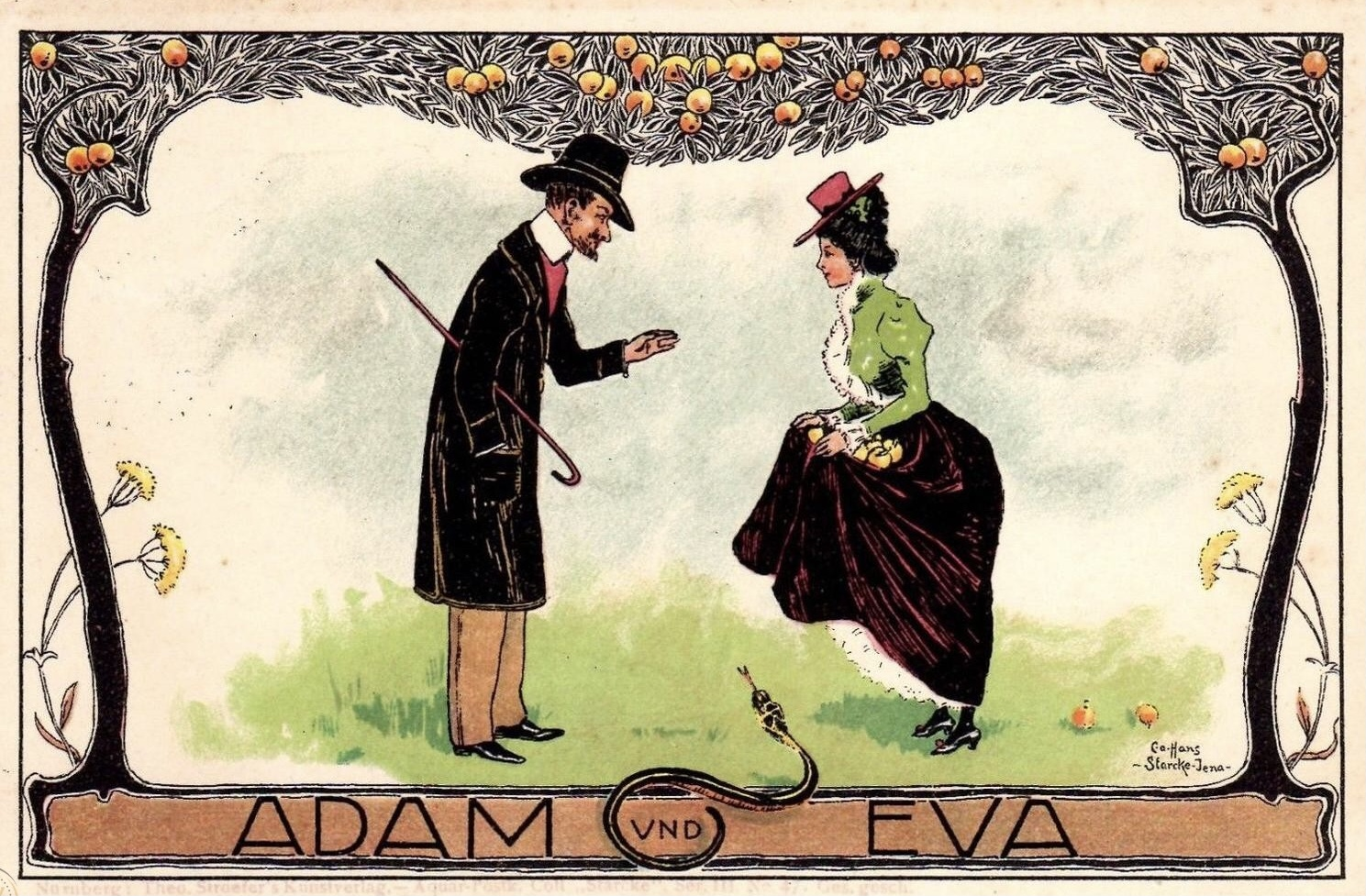
"Adam and Eve", c. 1901

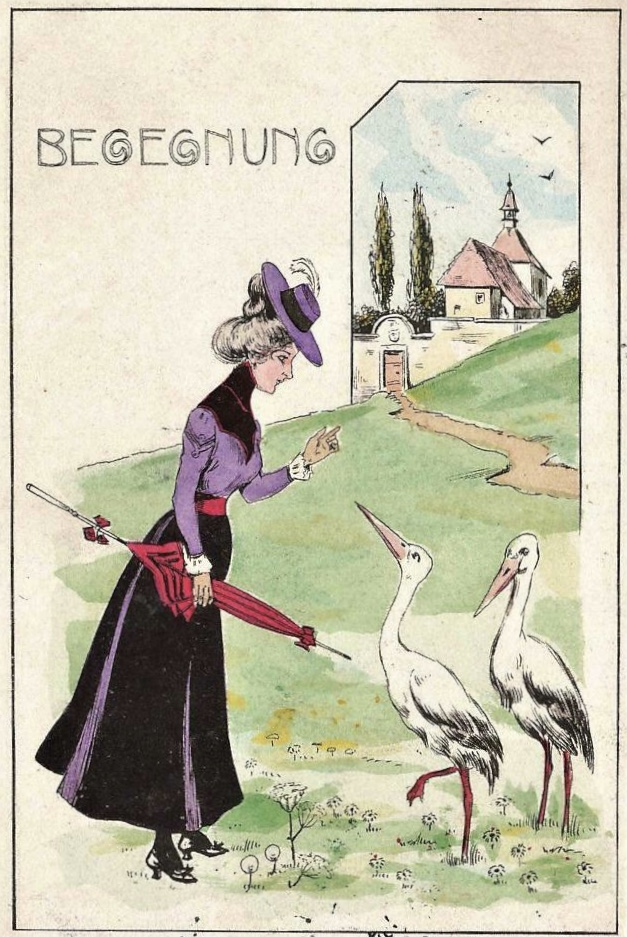
A meeting, c. 1901

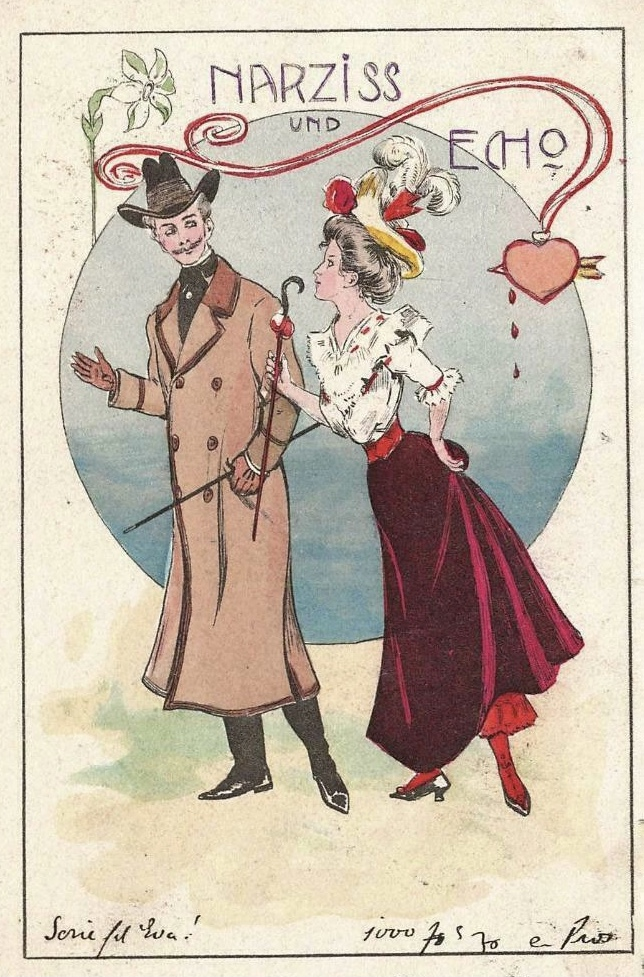
"Narcissus and Echo"

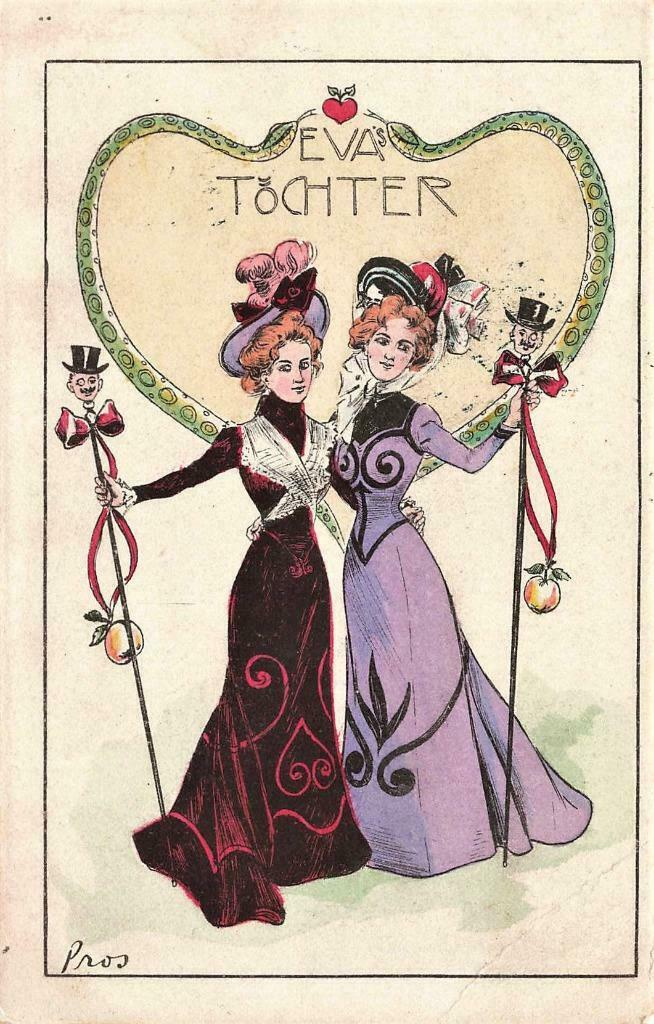
"Eve's daughters"

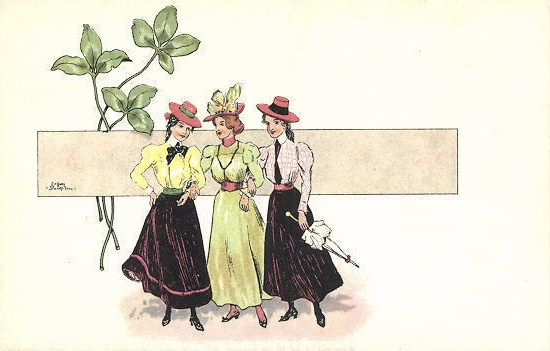
"Three girls in hats"
