= Harry Clark =

Harry Clark may refer to:

- Harry C. Clark (1883–1950), mayor of San Diego, California
- Harry Clark (actor) (1913–1956), American actor
- Harry Clark (cricketer) (1892–1973), Australian cricketer
- Harry Clark (footballer, born 1932) (1932–2021), English football forward for Darlington, Sheffield Wednesday and Hartlepool
- Harry Clark (footballer, born 1934) (1934–2017), English football inside forward for Sunderland
- Harry Clark (playwright), American cellist and playwright
- Harry E. Clark (1894–1970), American college football player and coach
- Harry Hayden Clark (1901–1971), American professor of English
- Harry R. Clark, member of the Arizona House of Representatives

== See also ==
- Harry Clarke (disambiguation)
- Henry Clark (disambiguation)
- Harold Clark (disambiguation)
- Harrison Clark (disambiguation)
