= Atlee Ayres =

American architect (1873–1969)

Atlee Bernard Ayres (July 12, 1873 – November 6, 1969) was an American architect. He lived in central Texas.

== History ==
Atlee B. Ayres was born in Hillsboro, Ohio, on July 12, 1873, the son of Nathan Tandy and Mary Parsons Ayres. The family moved to Texas, lived in Houston, and then moved to San Antonio in 1888, where Ayres's father managed the Alamo Flats luxury apartment hotel for many years. In 1890, Ayres went to New York to study at the Metropolitan School of Architecture, a subsidiary of Columbia University. There, he won first prize in the school's annual design competition. His teachers included William Ware, a student of Richard Morris Hunt. Ayres took drawing lessons at the Art Students League at night and studied painting under the noted teacher and artist Frank Vincent DuMond.

Upon his graduation in 1894, he returned to San Antonio and worked for various architects. He subsequently moved to Mexico City, where he practiced until 1900. That year he moved back to San Antonio and began a partnership with Charles A. Coughlin that lasted until Coughlin's death in 1905. One of their projects was the three-story home of Ethel Draught, at 1215 N. St. Mary's St, now part of the campus of Providence Catholic School.

Early in his solo career in San Antonio, Ayres designed a hotel (1907) later known as the Heimann Building, and now occupied by Avance, a non-profit serving children and families in need. He also made the plans for the still-surviving Halff house (1908), and for a villa for Col. George Washington Brackenridge that was later torn down. He also designed the David J. and May Bock Woodward House, which currently functions as a club house for the Woman's Club of San Antonio and was placed on the National Register of Historic Places listings in Bexar County, Texas on February 16, 1996.

Ayres drew the plans of Courthouses for Cameron County in Brownsville, 1912; for Jim Wells County Alice, begun 1912; for Kleberg County in Kingsville, 1914; and for Refugio County in Refugio, completed 1917. He also oversaw adding a third floor and extensive reconstruction of the original 1887 Val Verde County Courthouse at Del Rio in 1915.

From 1914 to 1917, Ayres served as the State Architect of Texas. In 1924, he created a new partnership with his son Robert M. Ayres. Many of the firm's works were designed in the Spanish Colonial Revival style architecture, which was massively popular throughout San Antonio and the surrounding area. They include the Hogg house (1924), the Mannen house (1926), the Newton house (1927), and the Atkinson house (1928), which is now known as the Marion Koogler McNay Art Museum. The firm was also adept in using other revival modes, including the English Tudor of the Jesse Oppenheimer residence (1924) and the Colonial Revival of the H. Lutcher Brown residence (1936).

Other commissions include the Texas School for the Blind and Visually Impaired, the Texas State Office Building, the Carothers Dormitory (1937) and the original Pharmacy Building, among others on the campus at the University of Texas at Austin.

He was active with other public, commercial buildings, and residences in South Texas towns, such as the 1920 Uvalde home of then-Congressman John Nance Garner, and the 12-story addition to the Hamilton Hotel in Laredo in 1923. He designed the Seguin High School in 1914 (now the Mary B. Erskine School), the Starcke Furniture Co. building (1912), the Aumont Hotel (1916), Langner Hall at Texas Lutheran University, as well as the Blumberg and Breustedt mansions in Seguin. In San Marcos he designed a home for banker Lloyd Johnson in 1919. In Gonzales, his homes include the Booth House, now a bed & breakfast, and other fine homes.

He designed San Antonio's Plaza Hotel (1927), its Federal Reserve Bank Building (1928), and, with his son Robert, its first skyscraper, the thirty-story Smith-Young Tower (1929), "still one of the city's most commanding works." His firm helped design the exterior of the San Antonio Municipal Auditorium (1923) and the Administration Building at Randolph Air Force Base (1931), often affectionately referred to as the "Taj Mahal," and remodeled the historic Menger Hotel (1949–53).

== Professional life ==
Ayres authored the book Mexican Architecture: Domestic, Civil & Ecclesiastical in 1926.

He was a charter member of the Texas Society of Architects, and he was one of a group of architects instrumental in securing passage of state legislation in 1937 for the licensing of architects to practice.

Atlee B. Ayres was first architect from San Antonio to be honored as a Fellow of the American Institute of Architects, in 1931.

== Personal life ==
He married Olive Moss Cox in San Antonio in 1896, and the couple had two sons, Atlee Jr and Robert. After his wife's death in 1937, he married Katherine Cox in 1940. Ayres was still practicing architecture when he died at the age of ninety-six on November 6, 1969, in San Antonio. He was buried in Mission Burial Park in San Antonio.

== Gallery ==
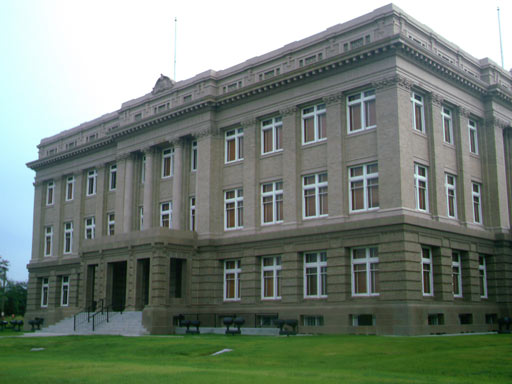
Old Cameron County, Texas Courthouse (1912)

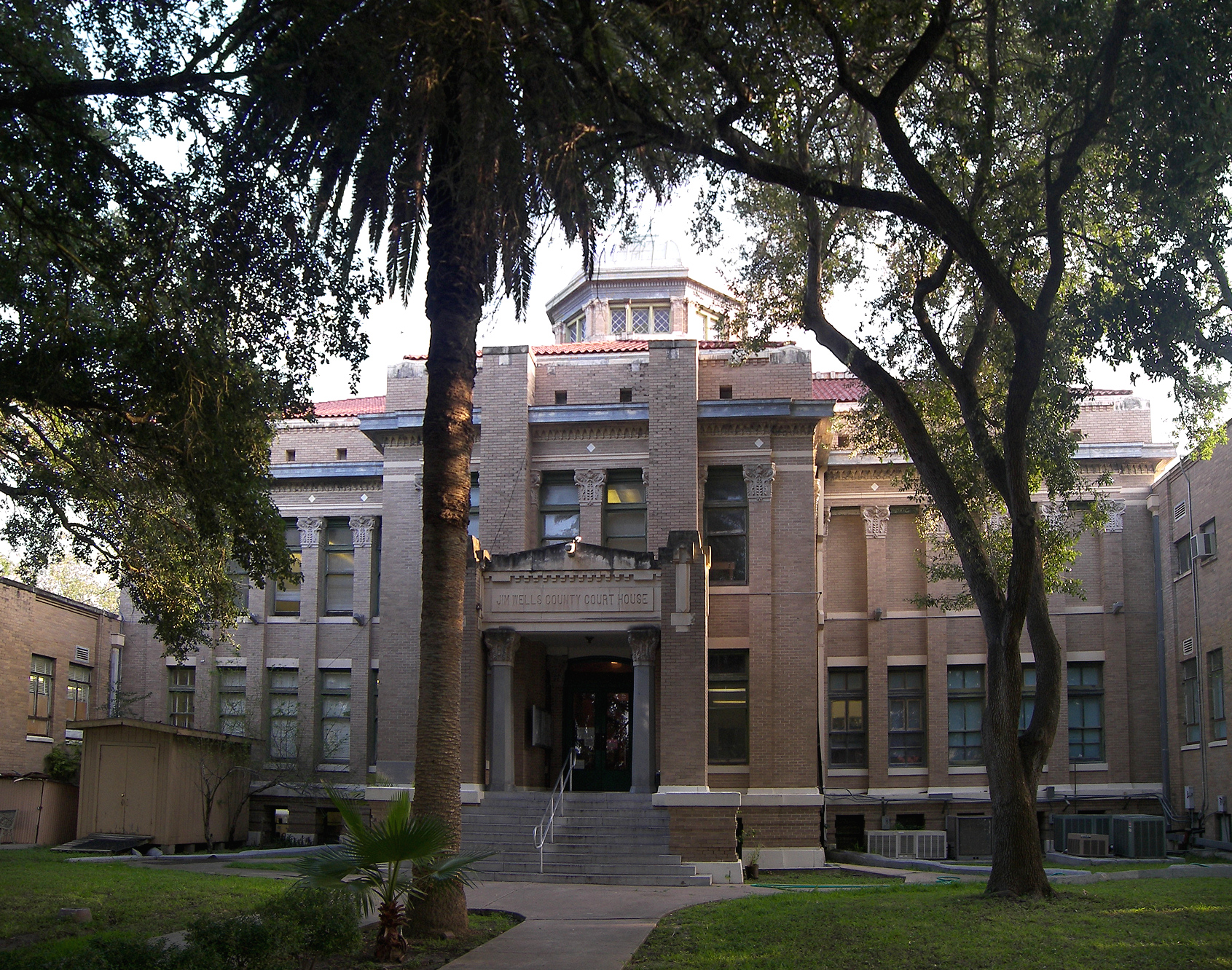
Jim Wells County, Texas Courthouse (1912)

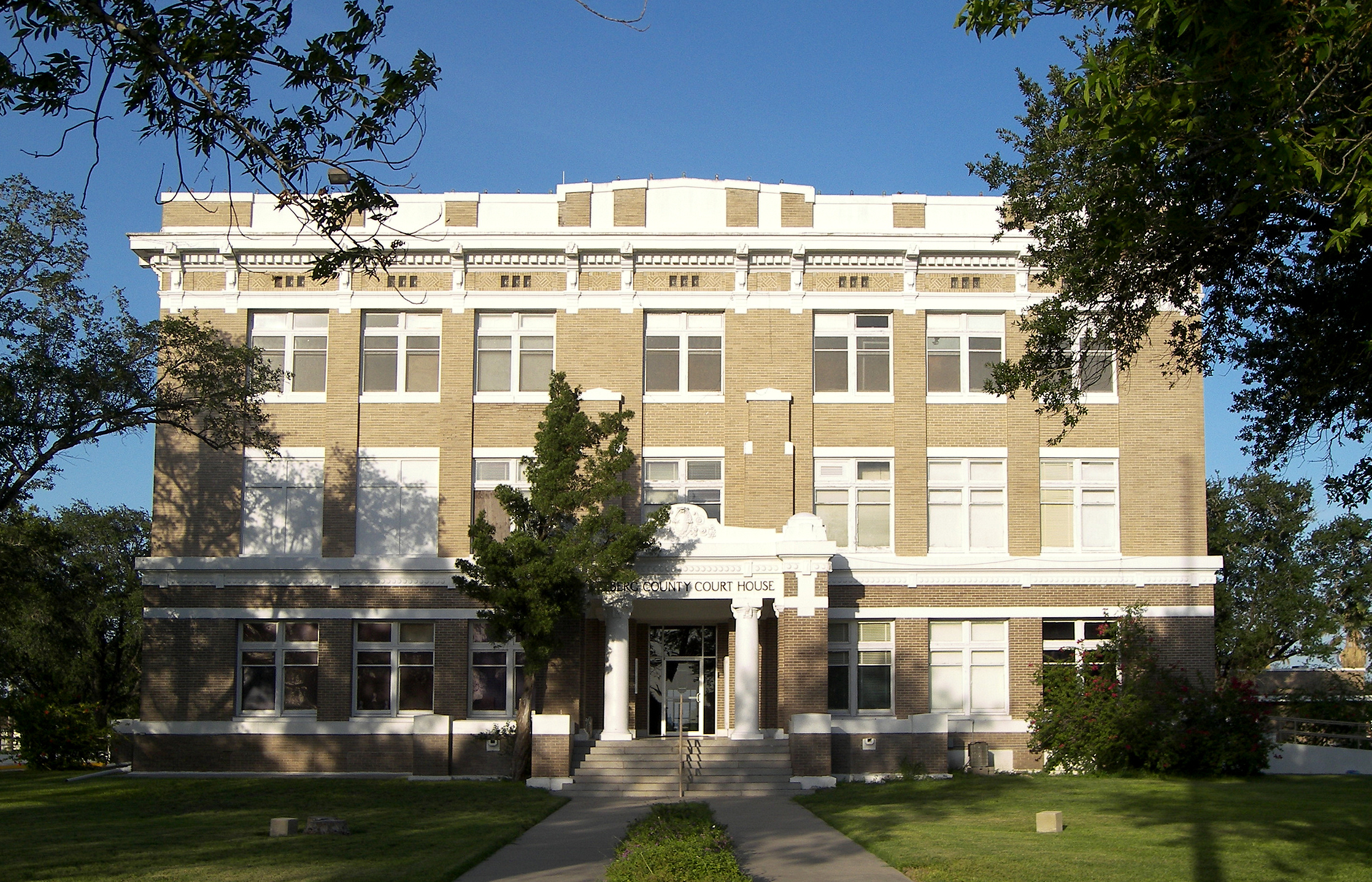
Kleberg County, Texas Courthouse (1914)

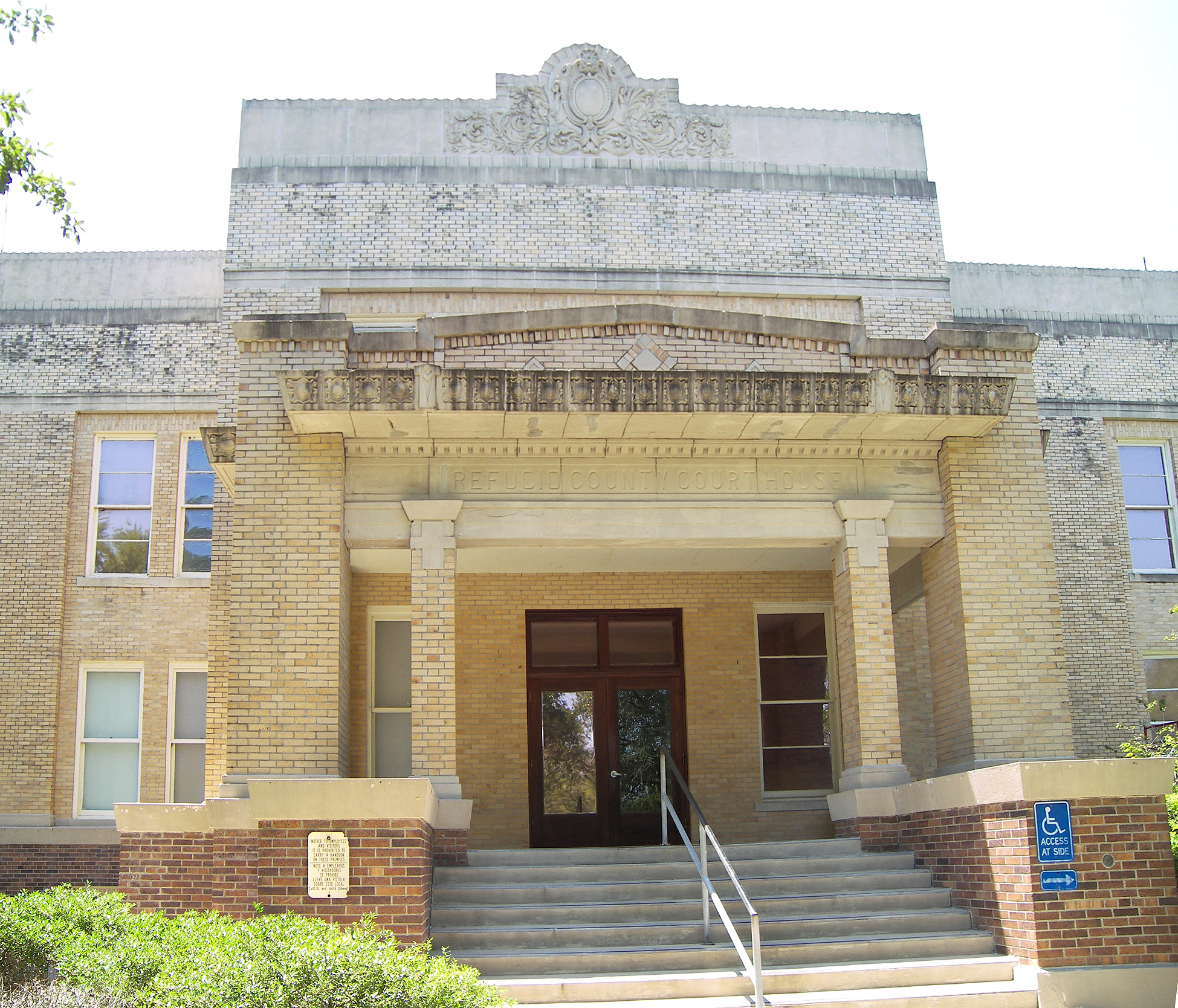
Refugio County, Texas Courthouse (1919)

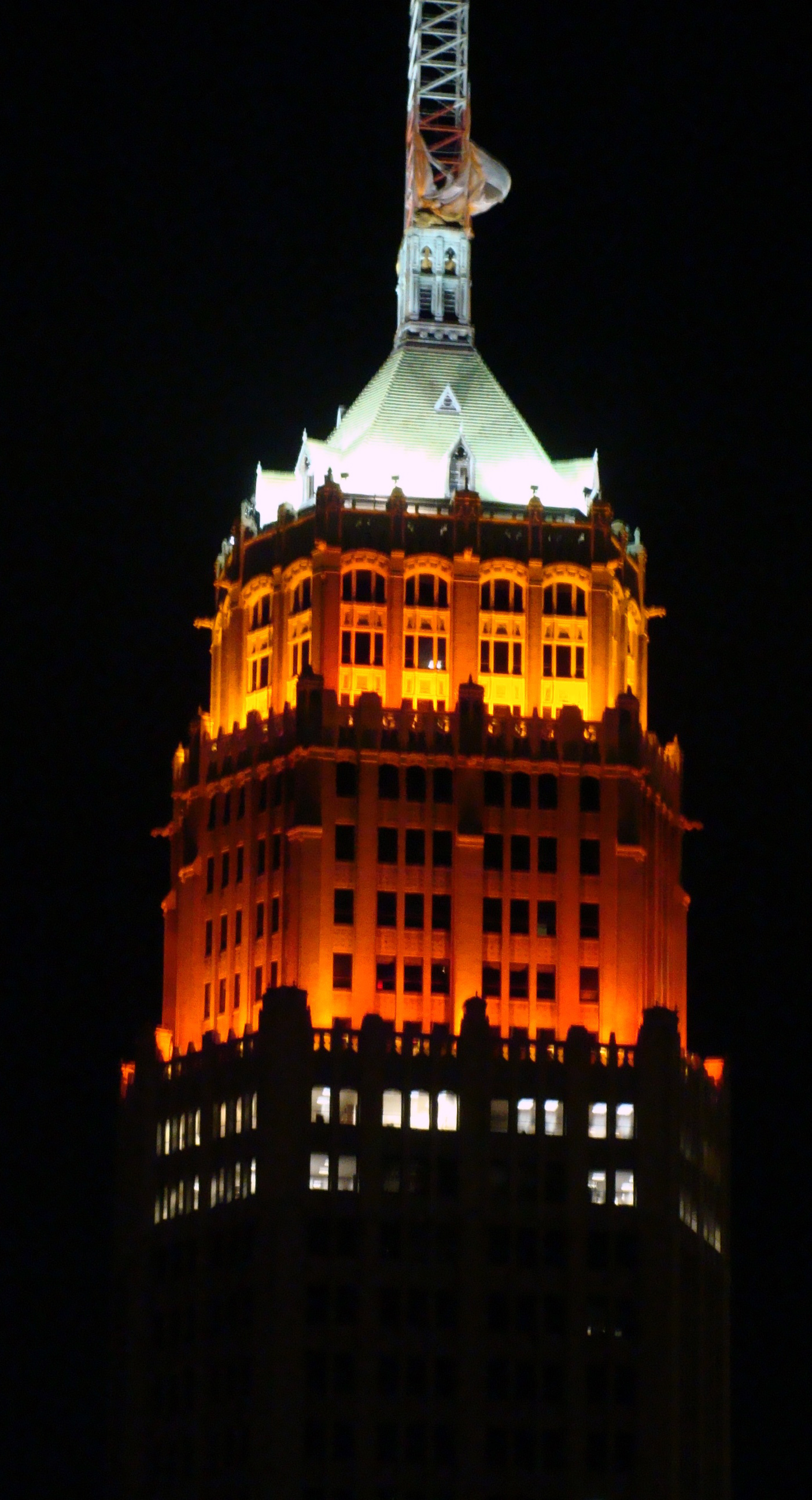
Smith-Young Tower (1929)

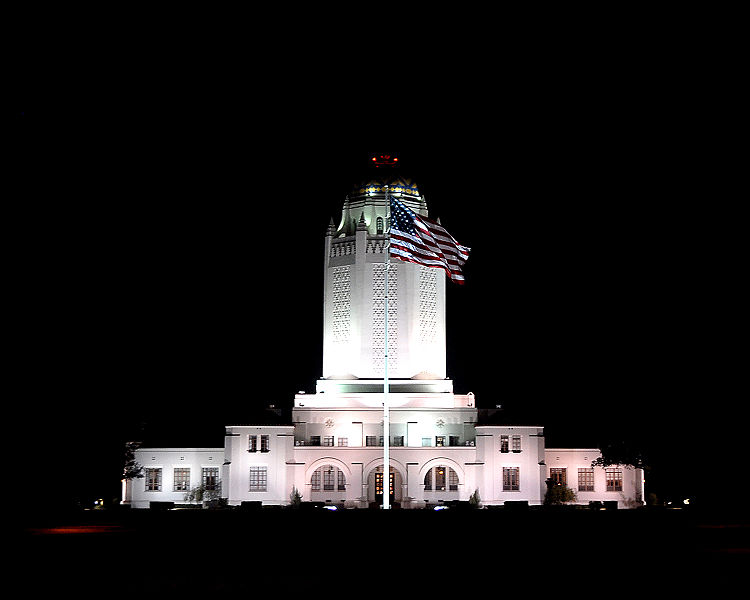
Administration Building (Randolph Air Force Base) (1931)

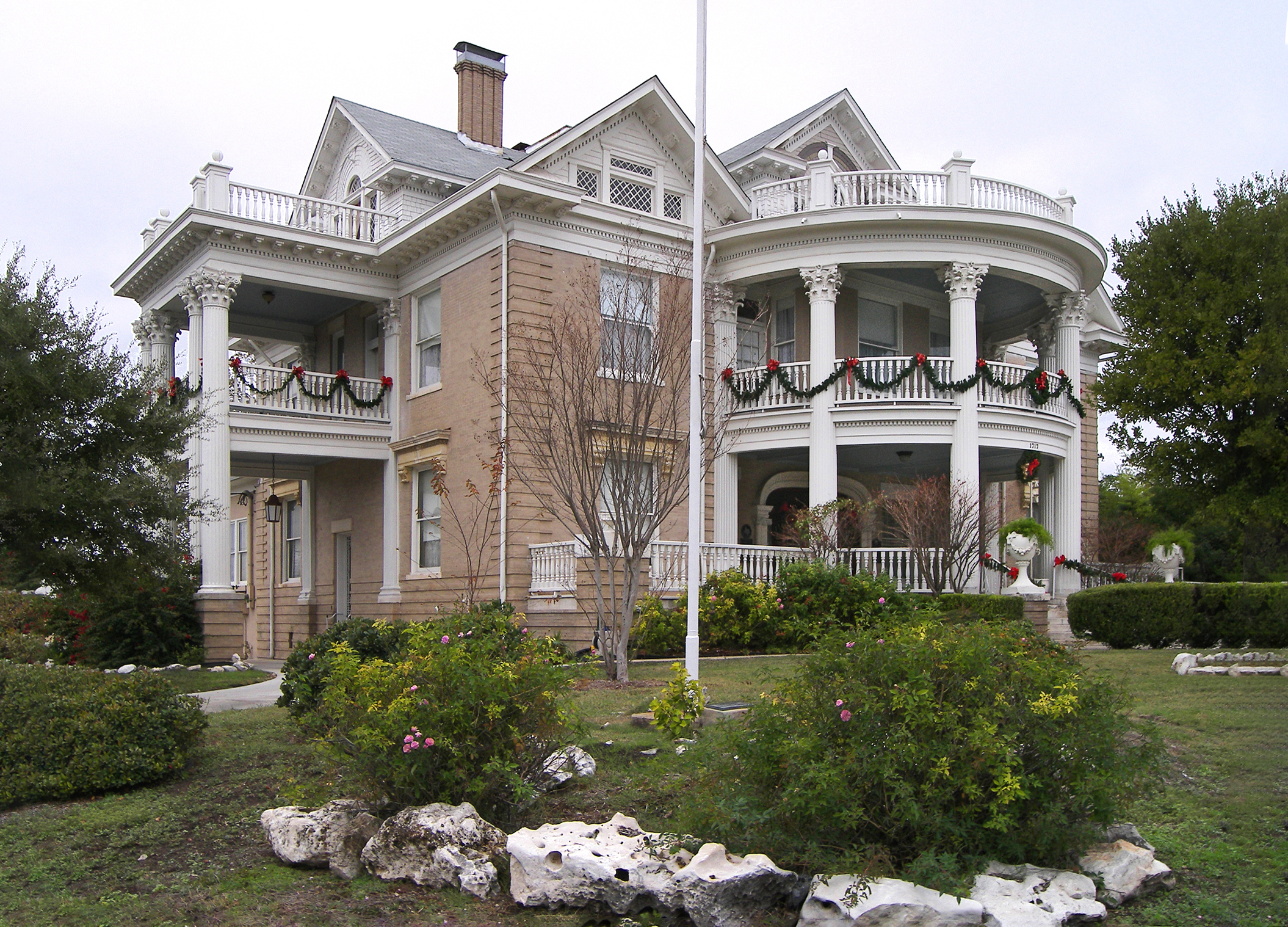
David J. and May Bock Woodward House, San Antonio

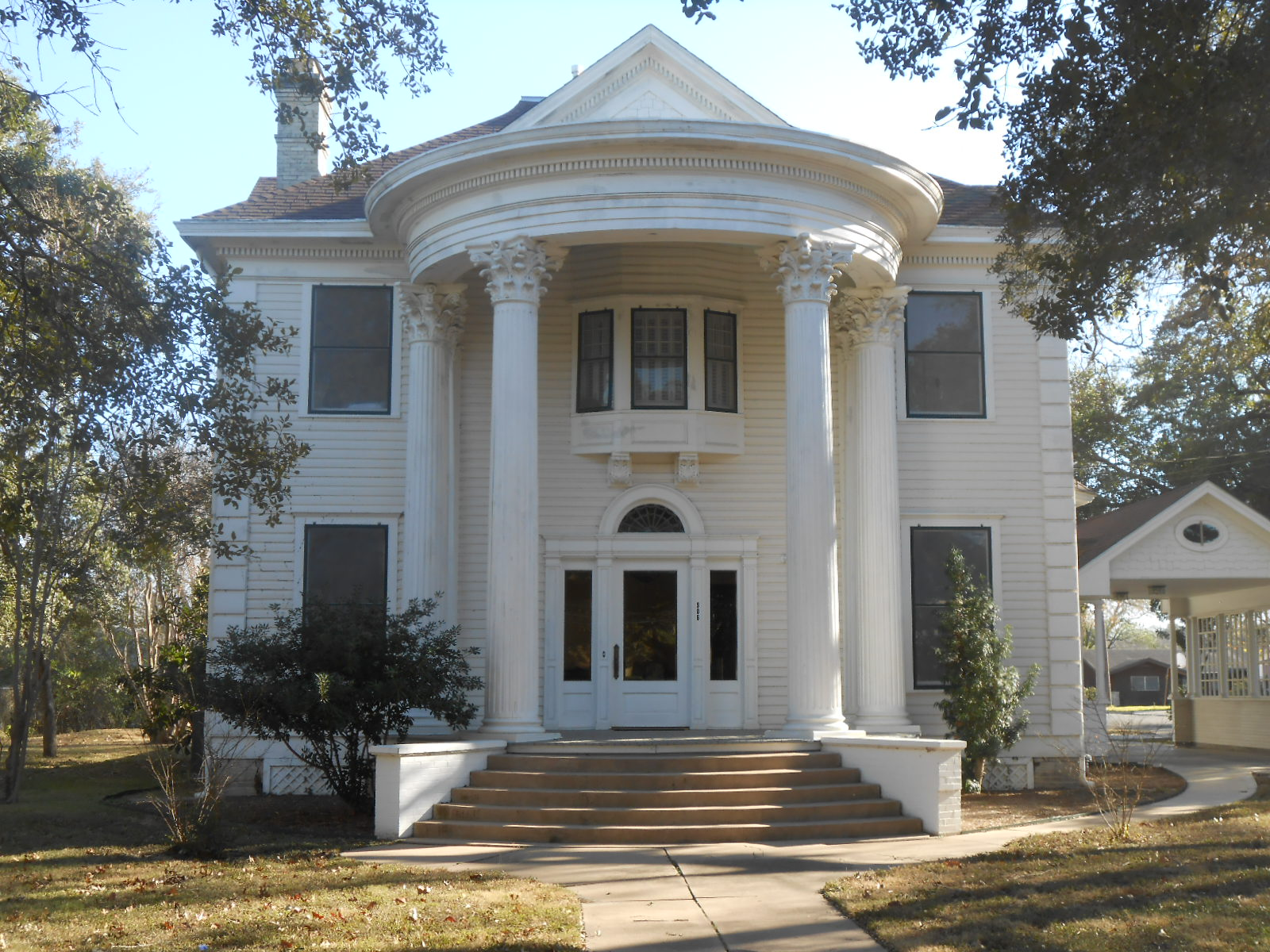
C.H. Hoskins House, Gonzales, Texas (1911)

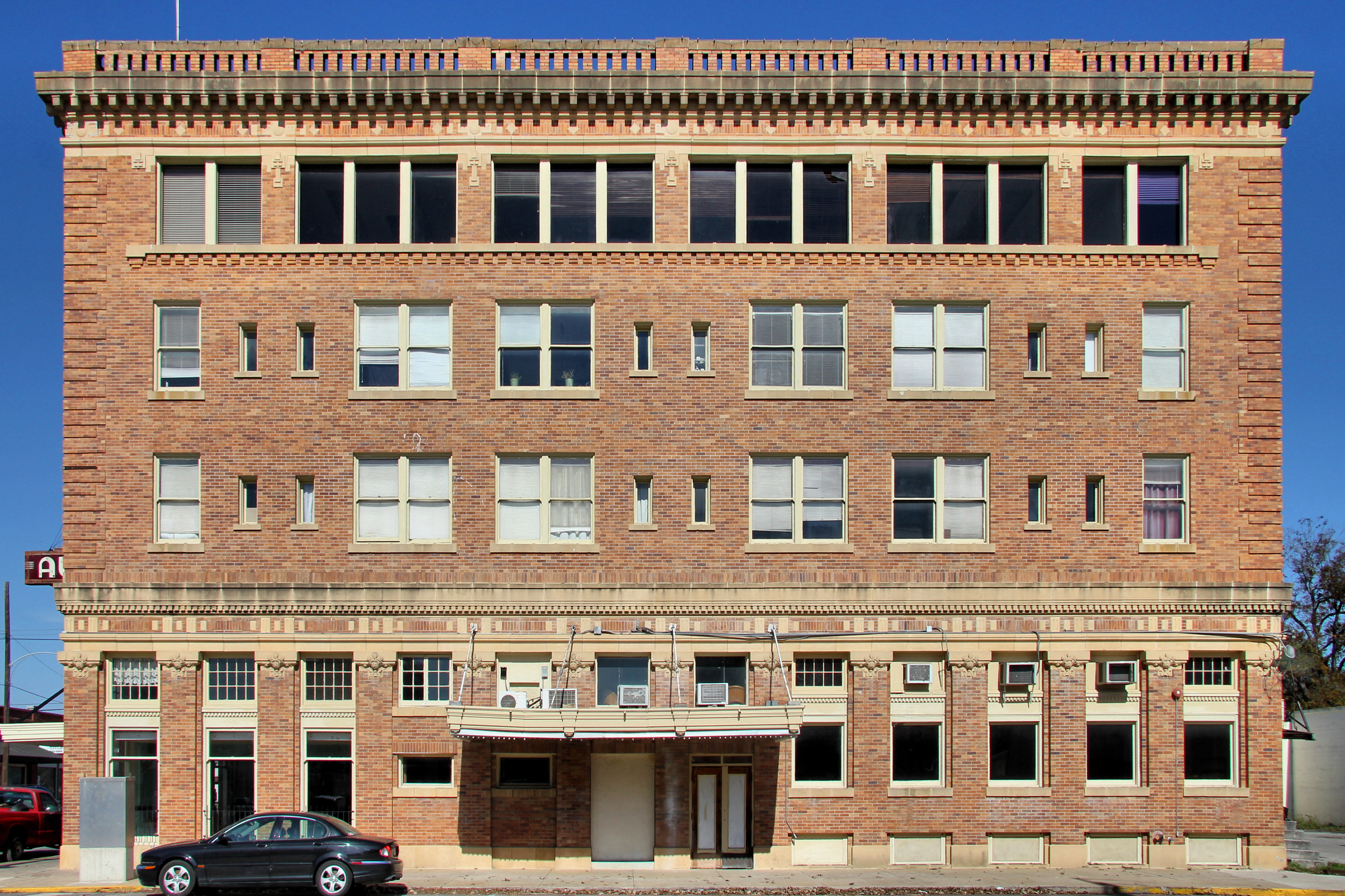
Aumont Hotel, Seguin, Texas (1916)

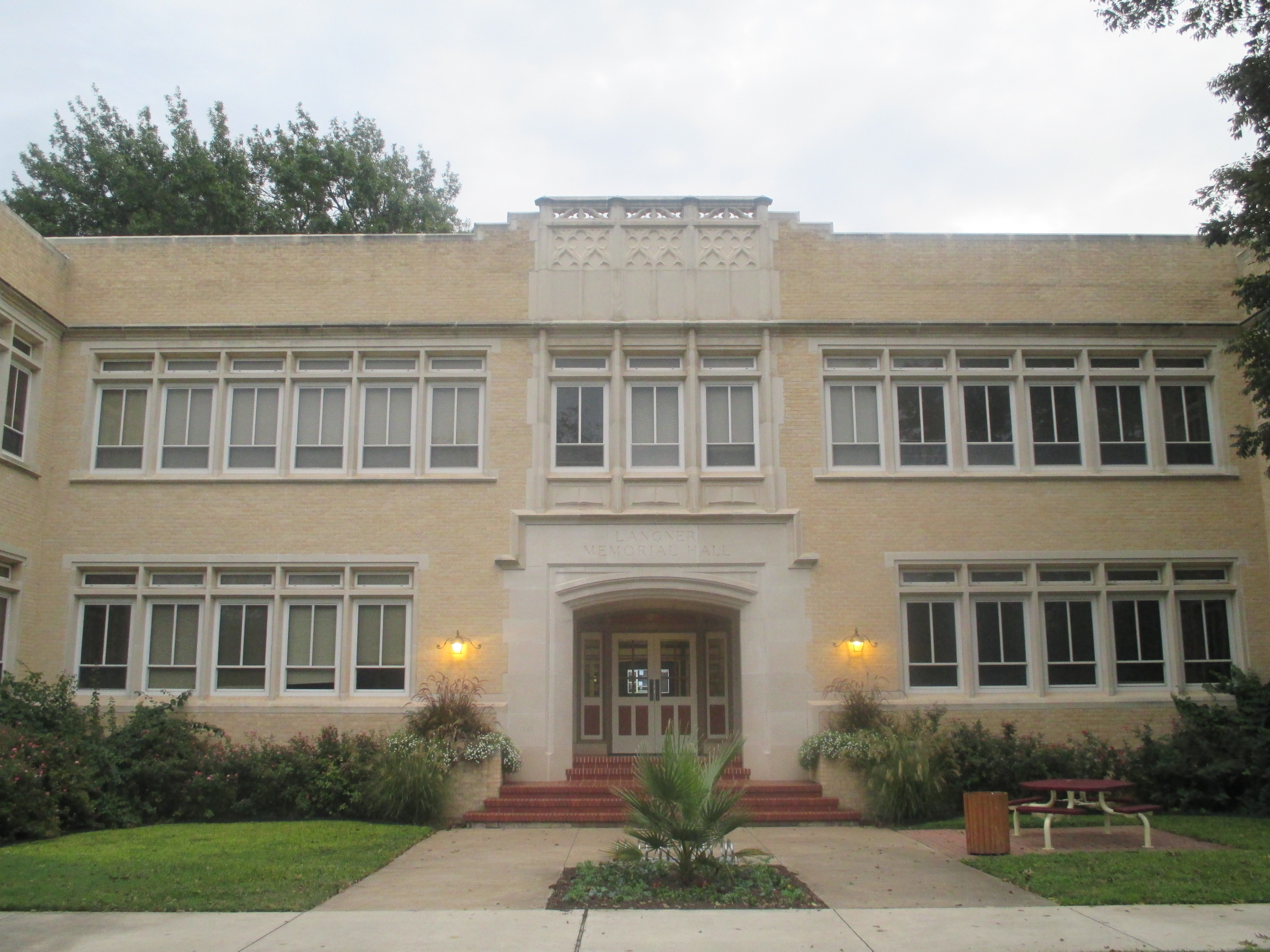
Langner Hall, Texas Lutheran University, Seguin, Texas

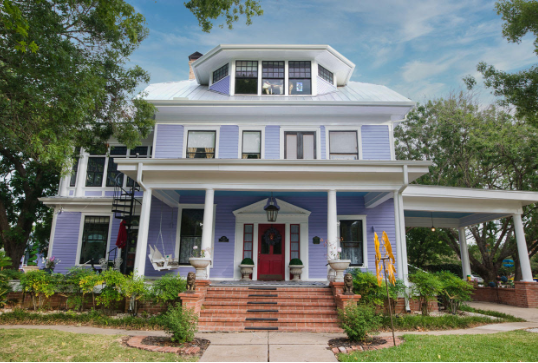
J.H. Boothe House, Gonzales, Texas (1913)
