= Henry Clarke =

Henry Clarke may refer to:

- Henry Clarke (theologian) (1700–1777), Irish academic
- Henry Clarke (mathematician) (1743–1818), English mathematician
- Henry Clarke (Australian politician) (1822–1907), member of the New South Wales (Australia) Parliament
- Henry Edward Clarke (1829–1892), businessman and politician in Ontario, Canada
- Henry Clarke (London politician) (died 1914), businessman and member of the City of London Corporation and London County Council
- Henry Joseph Clarke (1833–1889), premier of Manitoba, Canada, 1874–1878
- Henry Butler Clarke (1863–1904), lecturer on Spanish at the University of Oxford
- Henry Lee Clarke (born 1941), American diplomat
- Henry Lowther Clarke (1850–1926), English-born Anglican archbishop of Melbourne, Australia, 1905–1920
- Henry Clarke (baseball) (1875–1950), American baseball pitcher
- Henry Clarke (racing driver), American racecar driver in USAC and Indy Lights
- Henry Clarke Wright (1797–1870), American abolitionist and pacifist
- Mrs. Henry Clarke (1853–1908), English writer of children's books
- Harry Clarke (Henry Patrick Clarke, 1889–1931), Irish stained-glass artist and book illustrator
- Henry Clarke (American businessman) (1933–2013), American businessman and venture capitalist
- Henry Wilberforce Clarke (1840–1905), translator of Persian works by mystic poets
- Henry Clarke (photographer) (1917–1996), American fashion photographer
- Henry T. Clarke Sr. (1834–1913), American businessman, pioneer, and politician from Nebraska
- Henry James Langford Clarke (1866–1944), Royal Navy admiral
- Henry Savile Clarke (1841–1893), English dramatist, journalist and critic

== See also ==
- Henri Jacques Guillaume Clarke (1765–1818), duc de Feltre, French Minister of War, 1807–1814
- Henry Clark (disambiguation)
- Harry Clarke (disambiguation)
- Henry Clerke (disambiguation)
