= Harold Clark =

Harold Clark may refer to:

- Gene Clark (Harold Eugene Clark, 1944–1991), American singer-songwriter
- Harold L. Clark (1893–1973), U. S. Air Force brigadier general who designed Randolph Air Force Base
- Harold M. Clark (1890–1919), U.S. Army Signal Corps soldier and the namesake of Clark Air Base in the Philippines
- Harold W. Clark (1891–1986), American creationist

== See also ==
- Harold Clarke (disambiguation)
- Harry Clark (disambiguation)
- William Harold Clark (1869–1913), Canadian politician
