= Harold L. Clark =

United States Air Force general

- Born: September 28, 1893; Stillwater, Minnesota, US
- Died: August 23, 1973 (aged 79)
- Education: University of Minnesota
- Occupation: Architect
- Design: Randolph Air Force Base

Brigadier General Harold L Clark (September 28, 1893 – August 23, 1973) was an architect and career United States Air Force officer, who designed Randolph Air Force Base. Clark was born in Stillwater, Minnesota, and educated at the University of Minnesota and the University of Illinois.

Clark had a civilian background in architecture. He initially enlisted in the reserves of the Signal Corps of the United States army. He rose to 1st lieutenant after later enlisting in the United States Army Air Corps, assigned to Kelly Field. When plans were announced to build a new Air Corps training facility, Clark designed his vision of an Air City in 1928. He submitted his drawings to Brigadier General Frank P. Lahm, who was sufficiently impressed to have Clark detailed to work for him as Randolph Air Force Base was built. His design of the Administration Building became known as the Taj Mahal and was added to the National Register of Historic Places in 1987. The Randolph Field Historic District was added to the National Register of Historic Places in 1996. His drawings for the base were donated to the Library of Congress.

Clark served at various U.S. Air Force installations over the next two decades, and during World War II became commander of 52nd Troop Carrier Wing, Army Air Base at Pope Field in North Carolina, and the Troop Carrier Wing in the North African Theater of Operations.
