= Harry Clarke (disambiguation) =

Harry Clarke (1889–1931) was an Irish stained-glass designer and book illustrator.

Harry Clarke may also refer to:

- Harry Clarke (American football) (1917–2005), American football player
- Harry Clarke (Australian footballer, born 1876) (1876–1946), Australian rules footballer who played with Fitzroy
- Harry Clarke (Australian footballer, born 1885) (1885–1961), Australian rules footballer who played with St Kilda
- Harry Clarke (Australian footballer, born 1905) (1905–1989), Australian rules footballer who played with South Melbourne
- Harry Clarke (footballer, born 1875), English footballer
- Harry Clarke (footballer, born 1921) (1921–2015), English football forward for Darlington, Leeds and Hartlepool
- Harry Clarke (footballer, born 1923) (1923–2000), English footballer for Tottenham Hotspur and England
- Harry Clarke (footballer, born 2001), English footballer for Preston North End
- Harry Corson Clarke (1861–1923), American actor and baseball player
- Harry Gladstone Clarke (1881–1956), Canadian member of parliament, 1935–1940
- Harold Clarke (diver) (1888–1969), British diver
- Harry Clarke, perpetrator of the 2014 Glasgow bin lorry crash
- Harry Clarke, a 2017 play by David Cale

== See also ==
- Harry Clark (disambiguation)
- Harold Clarke (disambiguation)
- Henry Clarke (disambiguation)
