= Administration Building (Randolph Air Force Base) =

- U.S. National Register of Historic Places
- U.S. National Historic Landmark District – Contributing property
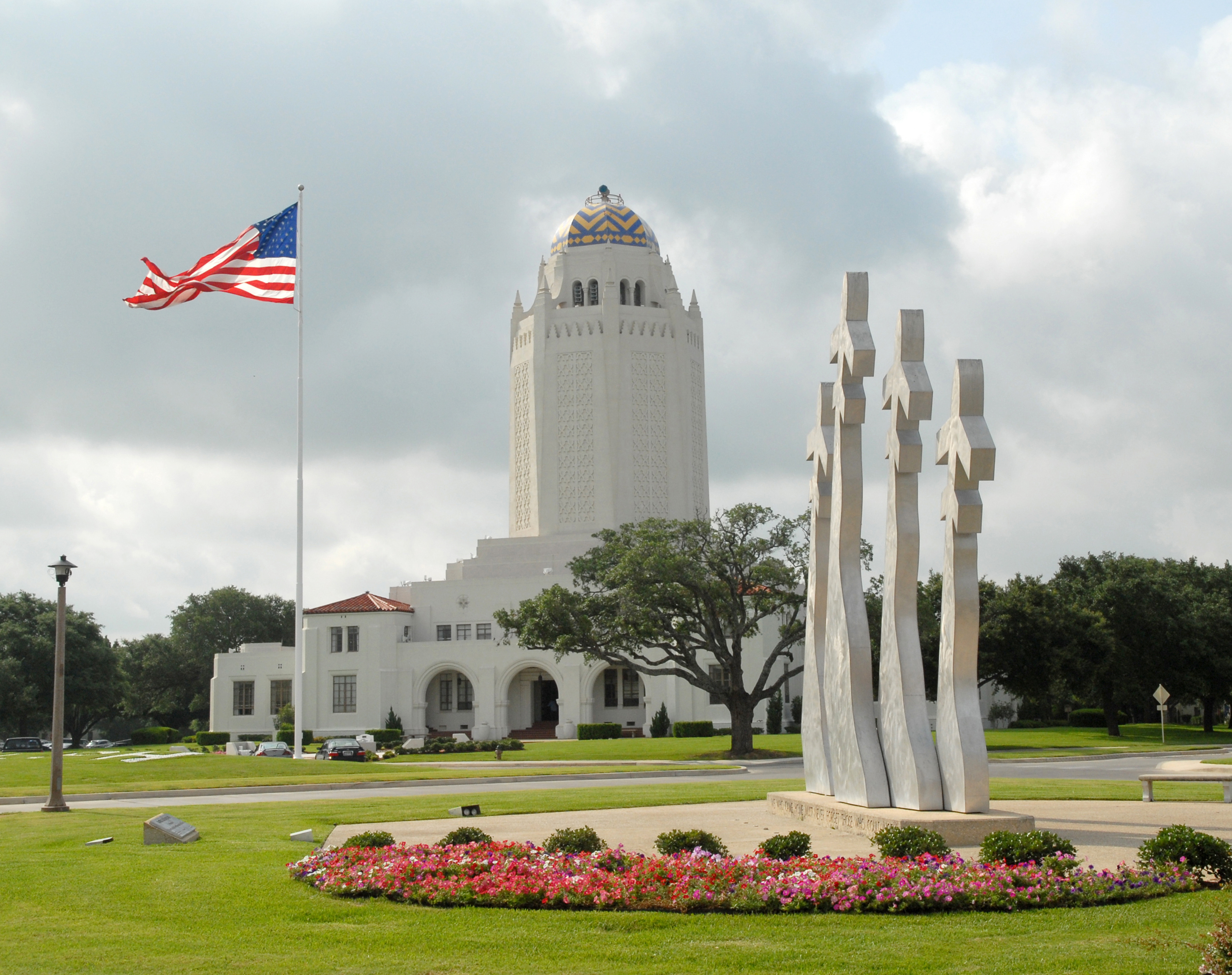
- aka the Taj Mahal; Missing Man Monument in the foreground

- Location within Texas Location within the United States
- Location: Universal City, Texas, United States
- Coordinates: 29°32′09″N 98°16′57″W
- Built: July 15, 1931
- Architects: 1st Lt. Harold L. Clark, Atlee Ayres, Robert M. Ayres
- Architectural style: Spanish Colonial Revival
- Part of: Randolph Field Historic District (ID96000753)
- NRHP reference No.: 87001434

Significant dates
- Added to NRHP: August 27, 1987
- Designated NHLDCP: August 7, 2001

The Administration Building at Randolph Air Force Base is headquarters for the 12th Flying Training Wing and located at Universal City, northeast of San Antonio, county of Bexar, in the U.S. state of Texas. The building is referred to as the Taj Mahal, or simply the Taj. It is Building 100 on the base, and was erected in 1931 at a cost of $252,027.50. It was added to the National Register of Historic Places in 1987.

== Design and construction ==
Basic design and layout of Randolph Field (renamed Randolph Air Force Base in 1948), as the training facility to be built near Schertz, Texas, for the newly created Air Corps, was drafted by 1st Lt. Harold L. Clark of Kelly Field in 1928 and approved by Brigadier General Frank Purdy Lahm. Clark's draft for the central building combined all administrative functions under one roof, including the water tower with a rotating beacon on the top. He later donated his drawings to the Library of Congress. Atlee B. Ayres and his son Robert M. Ayres were hired to draft the construction plans. The $252,027.50 facility designated as Building 100 was completed on July 15, 1931, and opened on October 5, 1931. Its iconic design is one of the great early Art Deco efforts in the United States.

== Features ==
Building 100 has been headquarters for the 12th Flying Training Wing since 1972. The two-story facility, with one-story wings on both sides, was designed with space for 22 offices on the ground floor, nine offices in the basement, and 18 offices on the second story. Floors and stairways were constructed of granite terrazzo. The base printing and photography needs were handled out of the building, and it also served as the mail processing center. Courtroom facilities were incorporated into the original design, and legal proceedings continue to be part of the building's usage. The 902nd Mission Support Group Office of the Staff Judge Advocate operates on the first floor of the Taj.

The building was nicknamed the Taj Mahal in its early years, due to what some thought was an architectural similarity to the Taj Mahal in India, and is commonly referred to as "the Taj". It has been featured in movies such as West Point of the Air, Air Cadet and I Wanted Wings. A detailed 15 by 18 in (0.38 by 0.46 m) replica of the Taj has sometimes been shown at military conventions. Carved from a block of wood in 1984 by base military retirees, the replica has a working electrical light beacon.

=== Water tank tower ===
The facility encompasses its most notable feature, a 170 ft (52 m) enclosed water tank. Clark's concept of incorporating the water tank into the building's architecture was aesthetically pleasing, but also was designed to eliminate its possibility of being the aviation hazard it might have been were it a stand-alone structure. Radio antennas and a climate detector on the dome supported the communications office headquartered in the building. The base water system is contained within the 500,000 US gal (1,900,000 L) tank which rests on an independent foundation inside the central octagon tower. The removable concrete walls of the tower are designed for tank maintenance. Topping the tower is a light beacon resting on a dome with a mosaic chevron design of blue and gold. An interior elevator leads to an observation deck at the bottom of the dome. Beneath the water tank is the Clark Rotunda, which features four murals painted by William Dean Fausett in 1942–1944 to represent the training cadets of that era.

=== Theater and memorial monument ===
The base theater is located in the rear of the building and was designed to seat 1,200 people. It hosted the world premiere of I Wanted Wings, which had been filmed at Randolph. Its original design had an orchestra pit below the stage. In 2012, the theater was operating at a loss and stopped showing 35 mm film. At that time it underwent a renovation as a 772-seat auditorium, and in 2013 was renamed in honor of Brigadier General Kenneth Raymond Fleenor who had been held captive and tortured for over 5 years in North Vietnam. After his repatriation, he spent the remaining years of his military service at Randolph as Base Commander and in other positions of authority.

On March 4, 1977, the Missing Man Monument by sculptor Mark Pritchett was installed in front of Building 100 by the San Antonio chapter of the Red River Valley Fighter Pilots to commemorate combat fatalities in Southeast Asia. Both the monument and the theater are part of events related to veterans, combat fatalities, prisoners of war and those missing in action.

== Gallery ==
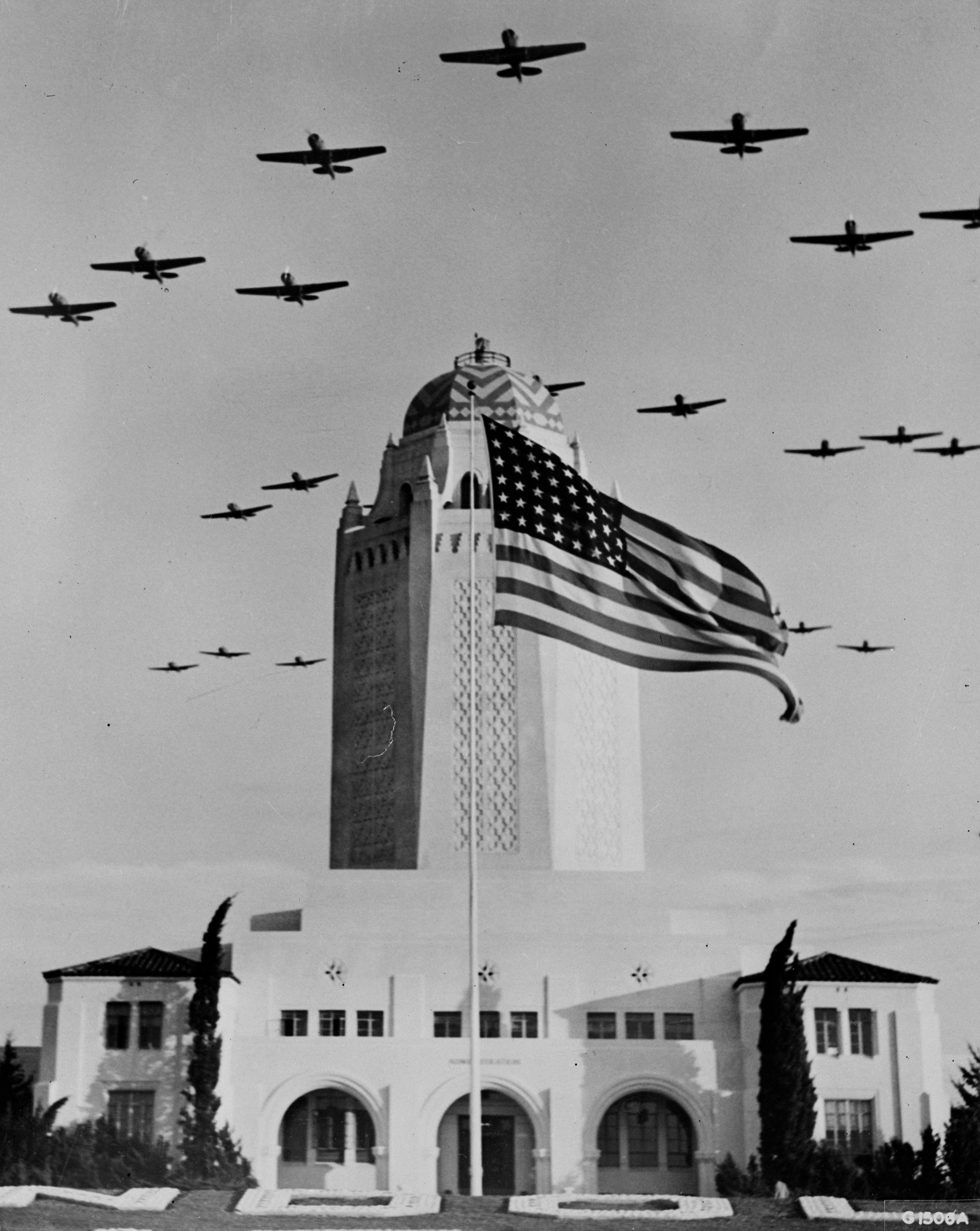
Randolph AFB Taj Mahal in 1942, with training planes overhead
