= Robert M. Ayres =

American architect (1898–1977)

Robert Moss Ayres (August 19, 1898 – August 7, 1977) was an American architect who lived and worked in Texas. He was the son and business partner of Atlee Ayres.

== Early life and education ==
Ayres was born in San Antonio to Atlee B. Ayres and Olive Moss Ayres. His parents sent him to the private military preparatory San Antonio Academy, and later to the college preparatory Haverford School. Upon graduation from Haverford, he studied architecture with Paul Philippe Cret at the University of Pennsylvania.

== Career ==
Ayres spent a year with an architectural firm in New York City before returning to San Antonio. In 1921, his father announced he had joined his firm, partnering as Atlee B. and Robert M. Ayres, Architects.

He worked on a number of projects with his father, including the following:

- 200 block of Mary Louise in Monticello Park, San Antonio
- McNay Art Museum
- Menger Hotel modernization and addition of a new wing
- Smith-Young Tower (1929)
- Administration Building (Randolph Air Force Base), known as the "Taj Mahal" (1931)
- Nave Museum (Royston Nave Memorial)1932, Victoria, Texas
- Old Cameron County Jail
- San Antonio Municipal Auditorium, for which he and the firm received a gold medal from the AIA in 1929 for the design
- Lutcher Brown House, a house in San Antonio.

He was president of the San Antonio chapter of the American Institute of Architects.

== Personal life ==
On December 2, 1925, he married San Antonio socialite and community organizer Florence Collett.The couple had four children. He died on August 7, 1977, and was buried in Mission Burial Park North in San Antonio. Florence died in 1992 and is buried next to him.

== Gallery ==
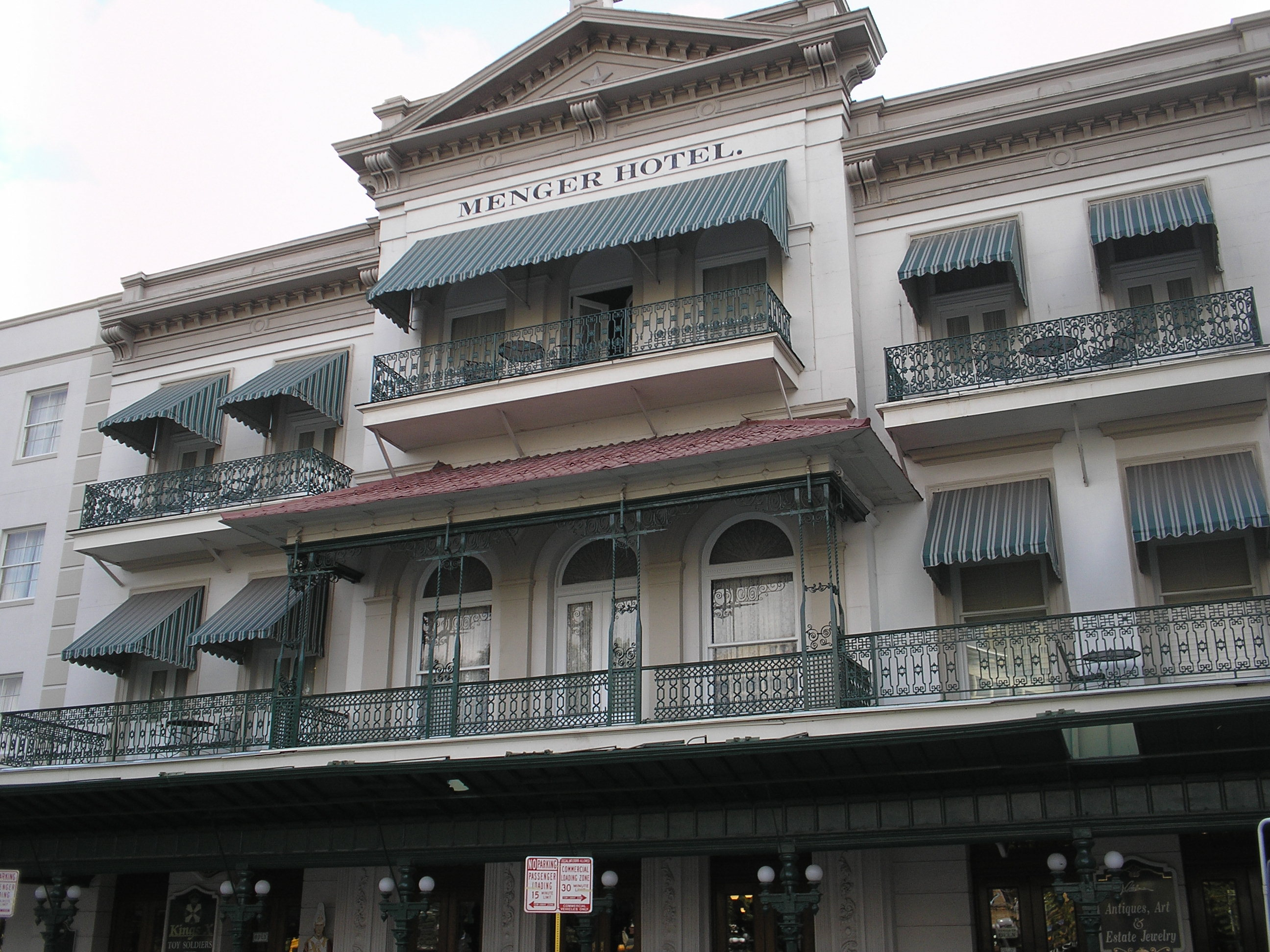
Menger Hotel

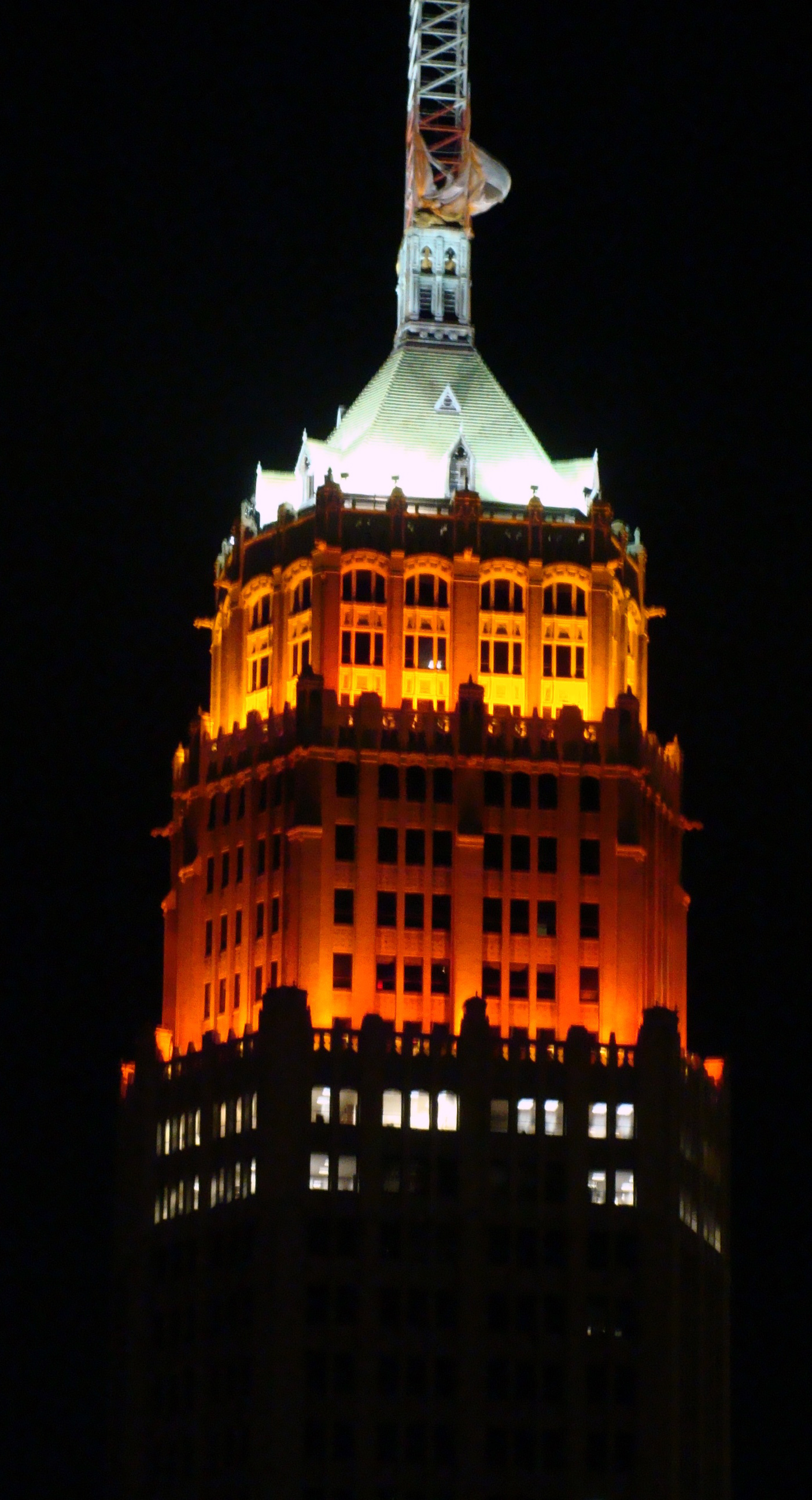
Smith-Young Tower (1929)

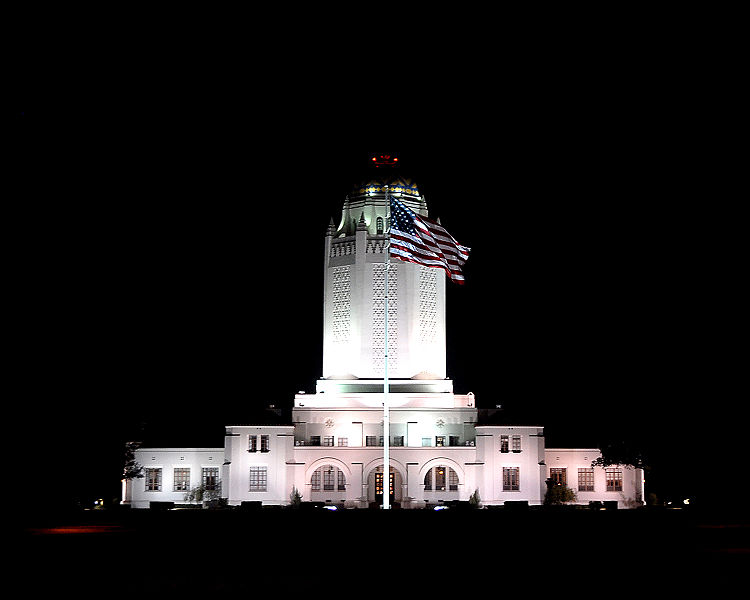
Administration Building at Randolph Air Force Base (1931)
