= Harold Clarke =

Harold Clarke may refer to:

- Harold Clarke (diver) (1888–1969), British Olympic diver
- Harold G. Clarke (1927–2013), American jurist and politician
- Allan Clarke (singer) (Harold Allan Clarke, born 1942), English rock singer
- Michael Clarke (priest) (Harold George Michael Clarke, 1935–1978), Anglican priest and educator

== See also ==
- Harold Clark (disambiguation)
- Harry Clarke (disambiguation)
