= Henry Clerke (disambiguation) =

Henry Clerke was a physician.

Henry Clerke may also refer to:

- Henry Clerke (MP for Rochester)
- Henry Clerke (14th century MP), MP for Winchester (UK Parliament constituency)
- Henry Clerke (MP died 1558), MP for Northampton (UK Parliament constituency)
- Henry Clerke (MP for Bramber), in 1572, MP for Bramber (UK Parliament constituency)
- Henry Clerke (MP died 1681) (1621–1681), MP for Great Bedwyn (UK Parliament constituency)

== See also ==
- Henry Clarke (disambiguation)
- Henry Clark (disambiguation)
