= San Antonio Municipal Auditorium =

- U.S. National Register of Historic Places
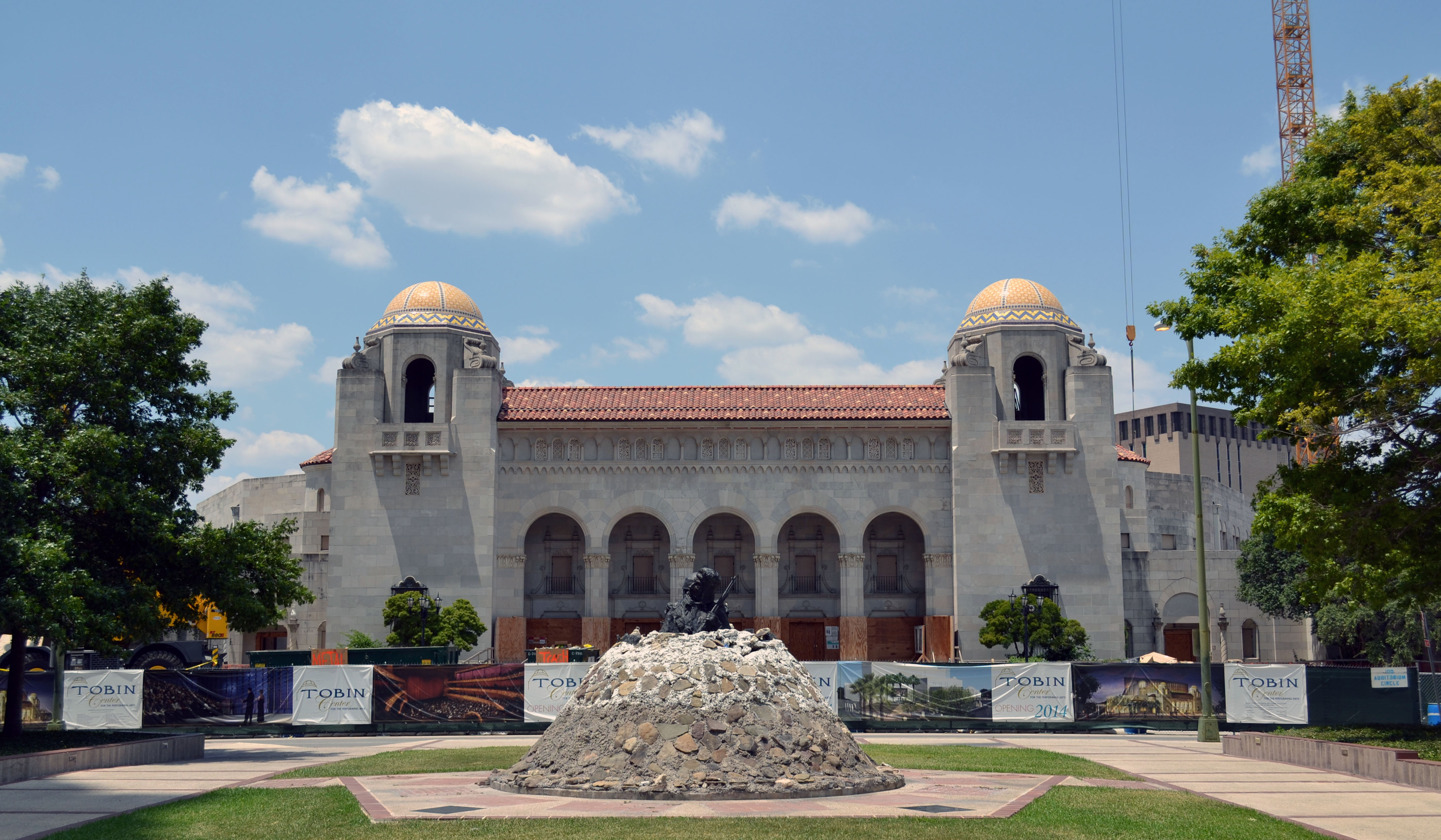
- San Antonio Municipal Auditorium (Korean War Memorial in the foreground)

- Location within Texas Location within the United States
- Location: 100 Auditorium Circle, San Antonio, Texas, US
- Coordinates: 29°25′50″N 98°29′20″W
- Area: 125,000 square feet (12,000 m^{2})
- Built: 1926
- Architect: Atlee Ayres; Robert M. Ayres; George Willis; Emmett Jackson
- Architectural style: Spanish Colonial Revival
- NRHP reference No.: 81000624
- Added to NRHP: September 14, 1981

The San Antonio Municipal Auditorium was a building located at 100 Auditorium Circle, San Antonio, Texas. It was built as a memorial to American soldiers killed in World War I.

The San Antonio Municipal Auditorium was also used as a concert venue.

In 2009, most of the Municipal Auditorium was razed, and construction on the Tobin Center for the Performing Arts began on the same site. The Tobin opened in 2014. Portions of the exterior of the old auditorium had been preserved and were incorporated into the new structure.

== Construction ==
The limestone arena was built in 1926 and designed in Spanish Colonial Revival style by Atlee Ayres, his son Robert M. Ayres, and their associates George Willis and Emmett Jackson. In 1929, the American Institute of Architects awarded the architects a gold medal for the arena's design. It was added to the National Register of Historic Places in 1981.

== Features ==
Initially built to honor America's World War I military dead, the 125,000 square feet (12,000 m^{2}) structure is part of the Veterans Memorial Plaza. The white marble War Mothers Memorial honoring the mothers whose sons who fought in World War I was erected at the corner of the arena in 1938 by the San Antonio Chapter No. 2 of American War Mothers. In front of the arena, Hill 881 South by sculptor Austin Deuel was dedicated to veterans of the Vietnam War in 1986. The 1994 Night Watch, aka Korean War Memorial, by sculptor Jonas Perkins is across from the auditorium's front entrance. Near the Korean War Memorial is the 1995 50th Anniversary of the Battle of the Bulge plaque on a granite monument.

== Architecture ==
The 6 acres (2.4 ha) on which the auditorium is built was purchased from different entities, including a garden area from the Ursuline Academy. The 12-sided shape of the arena features carved stone and an arcade entrance complemented by a domed tower on each side. Red stone tile and metal were used on the roof. The original interior featured two-level horseshoe-shaped seating. The design on the 36 by 75 ft (11 by 23 m) 5,600 lb (2,540 kg) asbestos auditorium stage curtain was the painting Founding of San Antonio by artist Hugo D. Pohl. The painting depicted the artist's vision of the 1718 founding of Presidio San Antonio de Bexar, and also included the Battle of the Alamo defenders James Bowie, Davy Crockett, William B. Travis and James Butler Bonham.

The auditorium seated 1738 patrons.

== Restoration ==
At the time of the 1981 NRHP designation, the building stood vacant due a fire that had destroyed much of the interior in 1979 and rendered the asbestos curtain beyond repair. An April 1981 voter bond referendum approved $9.1 million for restoration. The renovated auditorium was rededicated in 1985.

== Events ==
During the 2008 presidential election campaign, Barack Obama gave a speech in front of the building to his supporters.
