= American Book Company (1890) =

Defunct US educational book publisher

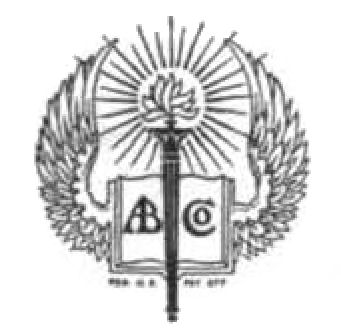
- Status: Defunct
- Founded: 1890
- Founder: Van Antwerp, Bragg and Co., A.S. Barnes & Co., D. Appleton and Co., and Ivison, Blakeman and Co.
- Defunct: 1981
- Successor: D. C. Heath and Company
- Country of origin: United States
- Publication types: books

The American Book Company (ABC) was an educational book publisher in the United States that specialized in elementary school, secondary school and collegiate-level textbooks. It is best known for publishing the McGuffey Readers, which sold 120 million copies between 1836 and 1960.

== History ==
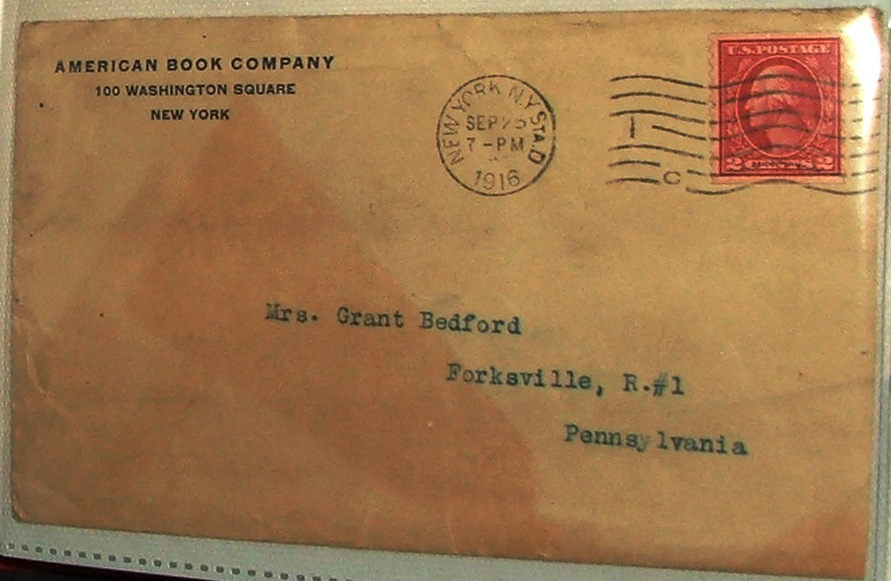
American Book Company, letter envelope 25 September 1916

American Book Company was formed in 1890 by the consolidation of Van Antwerp, Bragg and Co., A.S. Barnes & Co., D. Appleton and Co., and Ivison, Blakeman and Co. It was acquired by Litton Industries in 1967 and existed as a division of Litton Educational Publishing, Inc. until being sold to the International Thomson Organization in 1981. Thomson then sold its American Book Company K-12 assets to D. C. Heath and Company in 1981. The company was absorbed into D. C. Heath and ceased to exist as an imprint. Any remaining K-12 assets of the American Book Company are now owned by Houghton Mifflin (now Houghton Mifflin Harcourt), which acquired D. C. Heath and Company in 1995.

Many of the college level textbook rights of ABC/Litton were sold by International Thomson as well, to Van Nostrand Reinhold, though some remained under the Wadsworth imprint at Thomson, which is now Cengage Learning.

== American Writers Series ==
Beginning in 1934 and continuing into the 1940s, the American Book Company published a 23-volume American Writers Series with Harry H. Clark as the general editor. Each volume had one or two editors and consisted of "representative selections, with introduction, bibliography, and notes".

The volume on Benjamin Franklin drew a warm tribute from Carl Van Doren to Frank Luther Mott.
