= Henry Clark =

Henry Clark may refer to:

== Politicians ==
- Henry Toole Clark (1808–1874), Governor of North Carolina, 1861–1862
- Henry Selby Clark (1809–1869), U.S. Representative from North Carolina
- Henry A. Clark (New York politician) (1818–1906), New York politician
- Henry Alden Clark (1850–1944), U.S. Representative from Pennsylvania
- Henry Maitland Clark (1929–2012), Northern Irish colonial administrator and politician
- Henry W. Clark (1881–1959), Texas State Senator, Mayor of Stephenville, Texas

== Others ==
- Henry Septimus Clark (1835–1864), co-founder of Stonyfell Winery in South Australia
- Henry S. Clark (1904–1999), American Hall of Fame racehorse trainer
- Henry James Clark (1826–1873), naturalist
- Henry Marcus Clark (1859–1913), Australian businessman
- Henry Martyn Clark (1857–1916), Afghan-born British medical missionary
- Henry Ray Clark (1936–2006), folk artist and criminal
- Henry Wallace Clark (1880–1948), American consulting engineer
- Henry W. Clark (1899–1976), American college football player and coach
- Henry Raúl Clark, Honduran footballer for Honduras national football team
- Henry Clark, member of the English band The Rumble Strips

== See also ==
- Henry Clarke (disambiguation)
- Harry Clark (disambiguation)
- Henry Clerke (disambiguation)
