= Harry Clark (footballer, born 1932) =

English footballer (1932–2021)

Personal information
- Full name: Harry Maurice Clark
- Date of birth: 29 December 1932
- Place of birth: Newcastle upon Tyne, England
- Date of death: 23 February 2021 (aged 88)
- Position: Inside forward

Youth career
- Eastbourne O.B.

Senior career*
| Years | Team | Apps | (Gls) |
| 1950–1957 | Darlington | 141 | (27) |
| 1957–1958 | Sheffield Wednesday | 1 | (0) |
| 1958–1961 | Hartlepools United | 118 | (43) |
| – | Horden Colliery Welfare | | |
- * Club domestic league appearances and goals

Harry Maurice Clark (29 December 1932 – 23 February 2021) was an English footballer who scored 70 goals from 260 appearances in the Football League playing as an inside forward for Darlington, Sheffield Wednesday and Hartlepools United. He also played non-league football for Horden Colliery Welfare. While with Darlington, he was known as "young Harry", to distinguish him from the older Harry Clarke, also a forward, who played football and cricket for Darlington at around the same time.
