= Harry Hayden Clark =

Harry Hayden Clark (1901–1971) was a professor of English, specializing in American literature. He was a Guggenheim Fellow for the academic year 1931–1932.

Clark graduated in 1923 with A.B. from Connecticut's Trinity College and in 1924 from Harvard University. At Yale University he was an instructor in English for the academic year 1924–1925. In the English department of Vermont's Middlebury College, he was from 1925 to 1926 an instructor and from 1926 to 1928 an assistant professor. From 1928 until his death in 1971 he was a faculty member of the English department of the University of Wisconsin-Madison. There he was the advisor for 104 doctoral dissertations. He contributed articles and reviews to Modern Language Notes, the Philological Quarterly, Encyclopaedia Britannica, The Bookman, the Saturday Review of Literature, and The Yale Review.

Clark taught at summer schools at the University of North Carolina, the Bread Loaf School of English of Middlebury College, the University of Iowa, Northwestern University, Stanford University, the University of Southern California, and the University of Wyoming. For the academic year 1953–1954 he was a visiting professor at Uppsala University and Stockholm University.

Beginning in 1934, Clark was the general editor for the 23-volume American Writers Series published by the American Book Company. He was a member of the editorial board of American Literature from 1943 to 1955. In 1948 he chaired the American Literature Group of the Modern Language Association. He was the president of the Wisconsin Academy of Sciences, Arts and Letters in 1965–1966.

== Selected publications ==
- Clark, Harry H. (1924). "A Study of Melancholy in Edward Young, Part I". Modern Language Notes. 39 (3): 129–136. doi:10.2307/2915147. JSTOR 2915147.
- —— (1925). "The Literary Influences of Philip Freneau". Studies in Philology. 22 (1): 1–33. JSTOR 4171903.
- —— (1926). "Lowell's Criticism of Romantic Literature". PMLA. 41 (1): 209–228. doi:10.2307/457660. JSTOR 457660. S2CID 163871831.
- —— (1929). "What Made Freneau the Father of American Poetry?". Studies in Philology. 26 (1): 1–22. JSTOR 4172018.
- —— (1933). "Toward a Reinterpretation of Thomas Paine". American Literature. 5 (2): 133–145. doi:10.2307/2920257. JSTOR 2920257.
- —— (1933). "Nationalism in American Literature". University of Toronto Quarterly. 2 (4): 492–519. doi:10.3138/utq.2.4.492. ISSN 0042-0247. S2CID 161208635.
- —— (1939). "Dr. Holmes: A Re-Interpretation". The New England Quarterly. 12 (1): 19–34. doi:10.2307/359973. JSTOR 359973.
