= Henry James Langford Clarke =

Royal Navy Admiral (1866–1944)

Admiral Henry James Langford Clarke, CBE (1 January 1866 – 28 March 1944) was a Royal Navy admiral.
