= Henry Clarke (theologian) =

Irish academic and theologian

Henry Clarke (1700–1777) was an Irish academic.

He was born in Ardress, County Armagh and educated at Trinity College Dublin. He became a Fellow of TCD in 1724 and Regius Professor of Divinity there in 1743. In 1746 he became Rector of Clonfeacle, a post he held until his death. He was a target for the Hearts of Oak, who considered he was maximising his tithes.
