= Harry Clarke (Australian footballer, born 1885) =

Australian rules footballer

Personal information
- Full name: Harry Herman Clarke
- Born: 6 October 1885; Carlton, Victoria
- Died: 15 April 1961 (aged 75); Croydon, Victoria
- Original team: Windsor

Playing career^{1}
Years	Club	Games (Goals)
1909	St Kilda	4 (2)
- ^{1} Playing statistics correct to the end of 1909.

Harry Herman Clarke (6 October 1885 – 15 April 1961) was an Australian rules footballer who played with St Kilda in the Victorian Football League (VFL).
