= Harry Clark (playwright) =

American dramatist

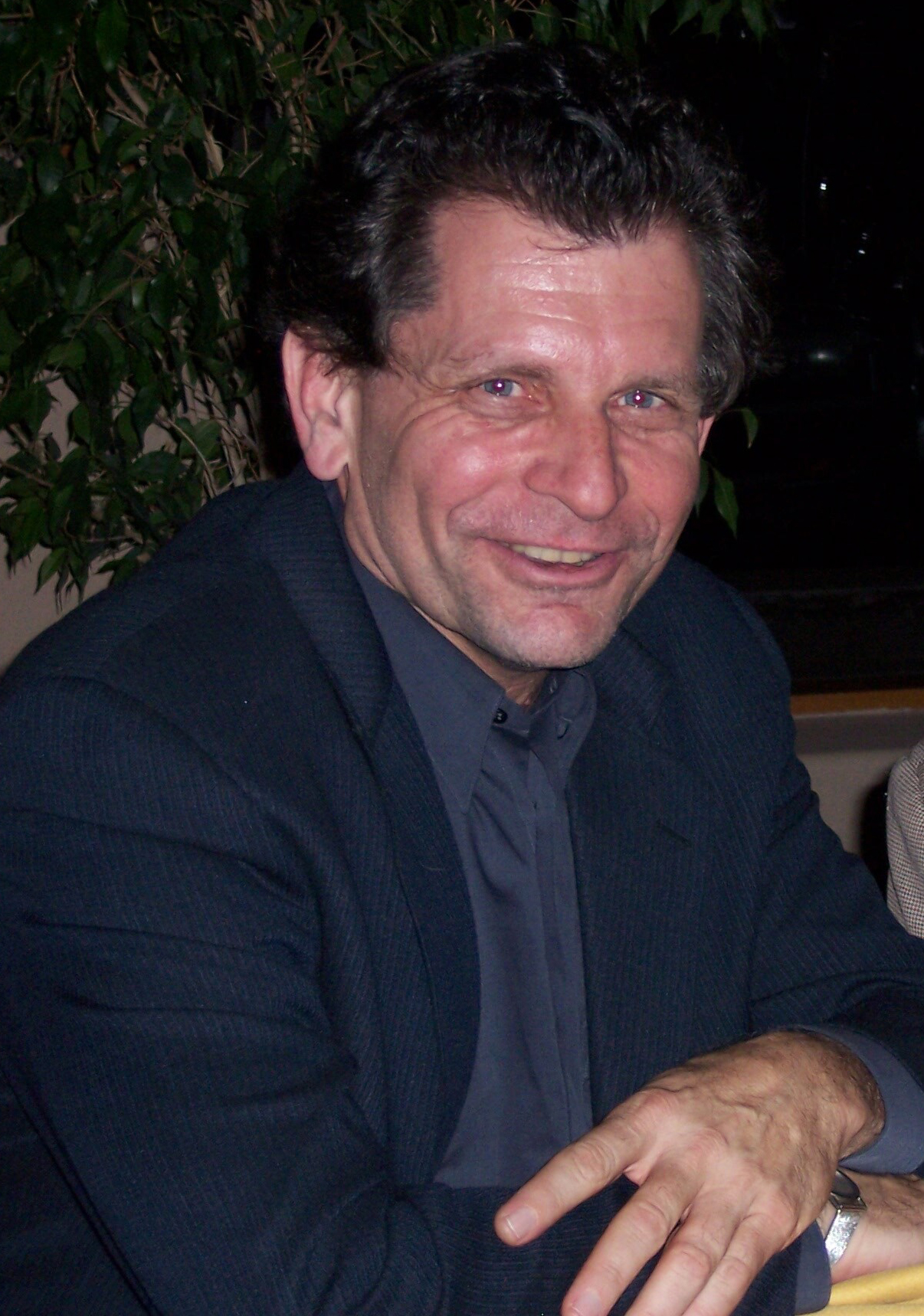
Playwright Harry Clark

Harry Clark is an American playwright and cellist. He is known for plays that combine drama with live or recorded classical music performance.

== Career ==
Born in Tucson, AZ, Clark began playing the cello at age 10. Former principal cellist with the Hartford Symphony Orchestra, he also played in a duo with his wife, pianist Sanda Schuldmann. The duo made their New York premiere at Carnegie Hall in 1974, and they have played with one another as a duo, part of the Fidelio Trio, and in other combinations since. In 1980, Clark and Schuldmann founded the classical music presenting organization Chamber Music PLUS, which pairs musical performance with insight into the creative process that led to the music. Clark has premiered and/or recorded well over one hundred works by prominent composers including Samuel Barber, William Bolcolm, David Diamond, Libby Larsen, Benjamin Lees, Avery Sharpe, Robert Starer, and Iannnis Xenakis.

Chamber Music PLUS's emphasis on telling the story behind musical compositions led Clark to develop a second career as a playwright. He has written over 50 dramatic works with or without music, collaborating with pianist André Watts, clarinetist David Shifrin, actor Michael York, and many others through his career. His plays, among them Lisztian Loves, An Unlikely Muse, and Raisin' Cane: A Harlem Renaissance Odyssey, have been performed at venues including the Apollo Theatre, the Los Angeles Theatre Company, the Ravinia Festival, and Chamber Music Northwest.

Clark's concert dramas and plays have led to collaborations with many prominent figures from film, television, and stage, including Robert Beltran, Jill Clayburgh, Theodore Bikel, Edward Herrmann, Barbara Feldon, Mason Adams, Keir Dullea, Philip Bosco, Hayley Mills, Harvey Fierstein, Caroline Kava, Rosemary Prinz, Sandy Duncan, Tovah Feldshuh, Jessica Walter, Michael Learned, Ron Leibman, Sharon Gless, Jean Marsh, Elke Sommer, Kathleen Chalfant, Katherine Helmond, Beth Grant, Stephanie and Efrem Zimbalist Jr., Jasmine Guy, Talia Shire, Jenny Sterlin, John Rubinstein, Margot Kidder, Robert Picardo, Armin Shimerman, Shirley Knight, Lou Gossett Jr., Bob Clendenin, John Schuck, Michael York, Richard Thomas, Jack Gilpin, and Lynn Redgrave. His work has been premiered by pianist André Watts, clarinetist David Shifrin, The Miro String Quartet, and directed by Rob Ruggiero, Carey Perloff, Dan Guerrero, Deborah LaVine, Samantha Wyer and Troy Hollar.

== Concert Dramas ==
- Song Without Words (1998)
- A Second Glance (1998)
- Patience for the Harvest (1999)
- Entelechy (Beloved, Brahms) (2000)
- Mazurka: My Friend Chopin (2000)
- A Stopped Clock: From Brahms to Bloomsbury (2000)
- Apres un Reve (2000)
- Sister Mozart (2001)
- Confidentially Chaikovski (2001)
- Copland & Me (2001)
- Sister Mendelssohn (2002)
- Mesmeric Mozart (2002)
- Beethoven's Sister-in-Law (2002)
- Daughter Schumann (2002)
- Schubert's Shadows (2003)
- Magdalena Bach's Will (2003)
- Remembering Amy: A Portrait of Amy Beach in Seven Vignettes (2003)
- A Beautiful Deception (2003)
- Suite Success (2004)
- The Unanswered Question (2004)
- Brother Chaikovsky (2005)
- Sisters of the Garden (2005)
- Dvorak's New World (2005)
- A Rare Pattern (2006)
- Fiddle Lesson for Albert (Einstein) (2005)
- Still Life (2006)
- Pardon My English: Gershwin, by Ira (2007)
- Go Ask The Little Horned Toad (2008)
- Love Letters: Beethoven to Bernstein (2009)
- To Lenny With Love (2010)
- Lisztian Loves (2010)
- Nevermore: Dreams the Only Reality (2010)
- God Glimmer (2011)
- Vivaldi's Four Seasons (2011)
- Rachmaninov Remembered (2012)
- Chancing Cage (2013)
- The Trials of Dmitri Dmitriyevich Shostakovich (2016)
- Sax Degrees of Separation (2016)
- An Unlikely Muse (2016)
- Suites Mysterious (Bach Solo Cello) (2019)
- A Basketful of Bagatelles (2020)
- Beethoven Remembered (2021)

== Plays ==
- Cornets of Paradise: When Charlie Met Emily (2005)
- Clouds in Heaven (2005)
- Pluto Deja vu (2006)
- Sarabande for Ezra (2007)
- The Combination (2008)
- Comedy for Grandmother (2015)
- The Return (2015)
- The Red Wheelbarow (Die Roten Schubkarre) (2016)
- The Baltimore Variations (2016)
- Man from Minot (2016)
- Raya’s Last Dog (2017)
- A Huge Incoherent Failure (Daisy Fay from The Great Gatsby) (2021)
- Witness Marks (2021)
- Thirteen Ways of Looking at a Blackbird (2025)
- Sigh (2025)
- Plop-Plop/Fizz-Fizz (2025)
- Canvas. Clef. Chapter. (2026)
- 29 Letters (2026)

== Musical Theater ==
- Raisin’ Cane: A Harlem Renaissance Odyssey (2004)
- Passionately, Piazzolla (2013)

== Other Offerings ==
- Jottings: An on-going supply of musings about persons, places, and predicaments of a life in the arts (2015–Present)
- Of Suites, Songs & Sonatas: Bach, Schubert, Chopin, Brahms and their inspirational muses. Four original scripts and additional considerations about the genesis, creation, and the artist inspirators of Bach's Six Suites for Unaccompanied cello; Schubert Songs, Chopin's Sonata for cello and piano, and Brahms four works for clarinet. (2016–2021)
- A Perfect Loss: Formerly known as Tucson Tales and Transmogrification: Recalculations, Recollections, Recriminations, Regrets, Reminiscences, Reveries & Riffs. A memoir of the author's early life in Tucson, Arizona (2020)
- Tales From Green Valley (Part I): Short story collection (2019)
- Tales from Green Valley (Part II) Short story collection (2021)
- Leaf Adamant: Short story collection (2025-2026)
