= Randolph Field Historic District =

Historic district in Texas, United States

- U.S. National Register of Historic Places
- U.S. National Historic Landmark District
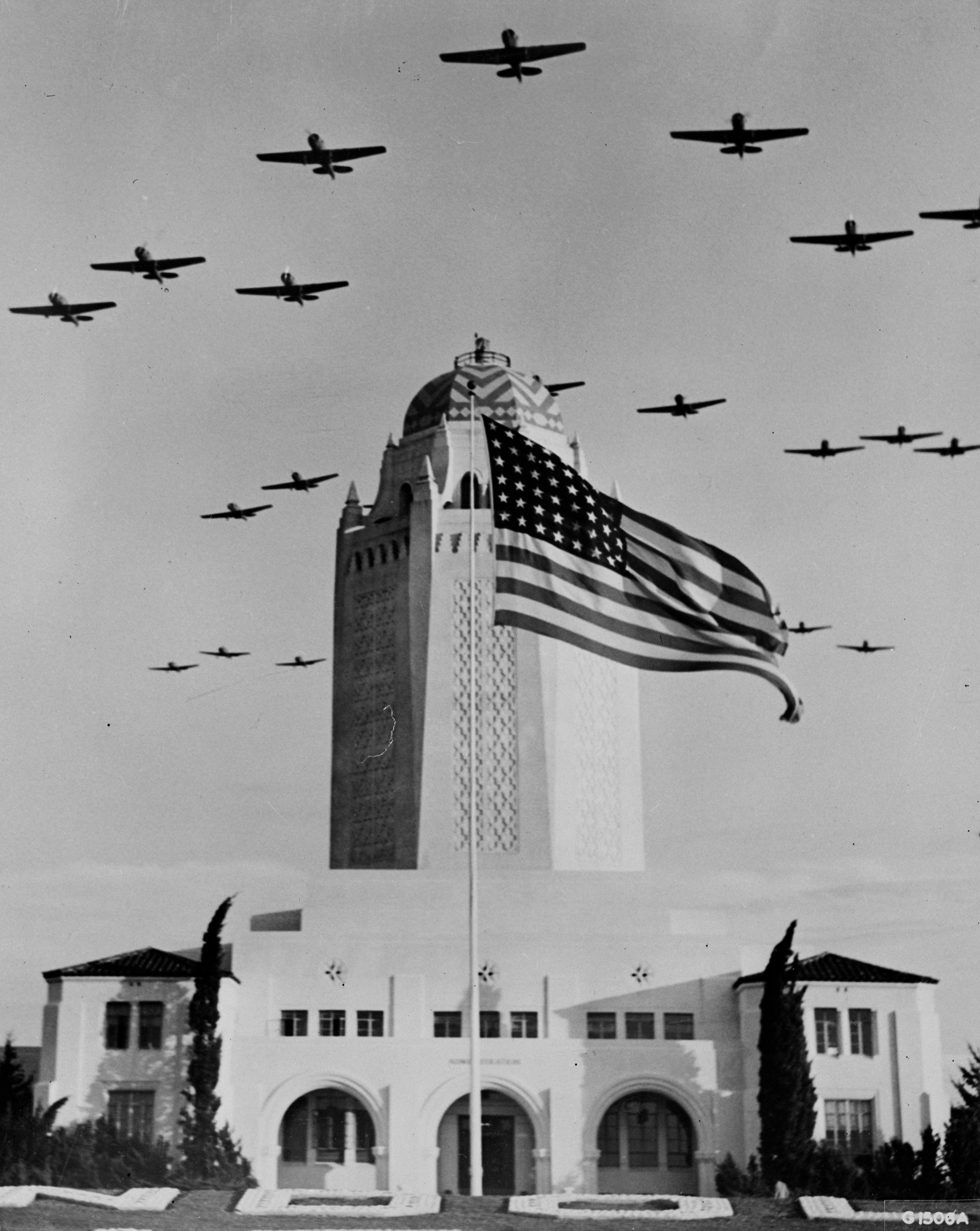
- The Base Administration Building, nicknamed the "Taj Mahal", in 1942

- Location within Texas Location within the United States
- Nearest city: San Antonio, Texas, US
- Coordinates: 29°31′56″N 98°16′48″W
- Area: 405 acres (1.64 km^{2})
- Built: 1931
- Architect: multiple
- Architectural style: Mission Revival-Spanish Colonial Revival-Streamline Moderne
- MPS: Randolph Air Force Base MPS
- NRHP reference No.: 96000753

Significant dates
- Added to NRHP: July 8, 1996
- Designated NHLD: August 7, 2001

Randolph Field Historic District is a National Historic Landmark District encompassing the central portion of Randolph Air Force Base, near San Antonio, Texas, US. Randolph Field was innovatively designed using Garden city movement principles, and includes a unique and well-preserved assemblage of Mission Revival and Art Deco architecture. Built between 1929 and 1931, it was the first permanent flight training facility of the United States military establishment, then the United States Army Air Corps and later the United States Air Force. It was listed on the National Register of Historic Places in 1996, and was declared a National Historic Landmark in 2001.

== Description and history ==
The United States Army Air Service provided the aerial warfare capability of the United States during World War I, but most of its facilities were disbanded with the end of that war in 1917. Some flight training operations were maintained at a variety of temporary facilities around the nation into the early 1920s, while a debate took place over the status of the air corps as part of the United States Army. In 1926, the War Department decided to centralize flight training operations, and the Randolph site northeast of San Antonio was identified in 1927. Construction began in 1928 and was essentially complete by the end of 1931.

Early plans for the airfield included a circular central element, originally divided by function. The final plan for the base was drafted by George B. Ford, and combined the idea of the circular center with Garden city movement principles, in which the circle contains residences, and the functional and operational parts of the base were located outside the circle. The design also addressed army concerns over the impact of long taxi distances (which increased exposure of the aircraft to dust, resulting in higher maintenance costs) by placing rows of hangars parallel to the field's two runways. The runways were oriented to maximize the benefits of prevailing winds. The design also included the visually prominent Administration Building, known colloquially as the "Taj Mahal", which is approached from the main base entrance and includes a 170-foot (52 m) tower that embeds the base's water tower.

Most of the residential buildings on the base are in the Mission Revival style. Their orientation in circular bands eliminates the procession of architecture often found on military bases, and there is individual variation among the buildings, with wings placed on different ends, and the exterior stucco given different coloring.

The 405-acre (1.64 km^{2}) site includes 350 contributing buildings, sites, and structures, and 47 non-contributing ones; in the Mission Revival, Spanish Colonial Revival, and Streamline Moderne styles.

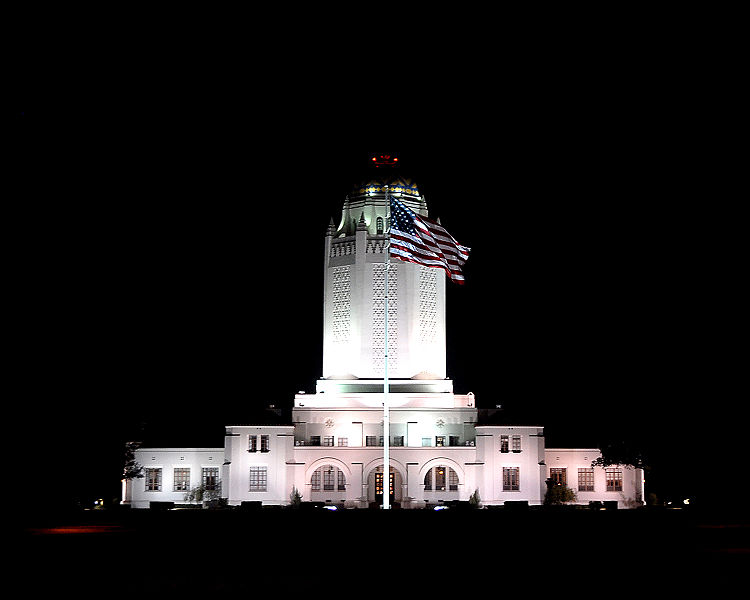
The Base Administration Building, long known as "The Taj Mahal", shown about 2008.

== See also ==
- List of National Historic Landmarks in Texas
- National Register of Historic Places listings in Bexar County, Texas
