= Avance (non-profit organization) =

US non-profit organization

AVANCE
- Type: Educational charity
- Purpose: Education and family support to predominantly Hispanic families in low-income communities.
- Location: San Antonio, Texas, U.S.
- Region served: U.S.
- Method: Education and Early Intervention Programs
- Key people: Dr. Teresa Granillo
- Website: www.avance.org

AVANCE is an American non-profit organization, headquartered in San Antonio, Texas, with locations across the United States. Formed in 1973, it provides free parenting and early childhood education programs to low-income, predominantly Hispanic, families with children of up to three years of age.

== History ==
AVANCE derives its name from the Spanish word for "advance" It originally started in 1973 as a 500-unit public housing development serving 35 families in San Antonio, Texas. Currently it encompasses more than 100 programs across the U.S. The number of participants in its early childhood education/parenting and family support services number several thousand. The concept of the organization is based on the educational theories of Urie Bronfenbrenner, of Cornell University, and whose graduate students established the first AVANCE program in Dallas, Texas, in 1973. The founders received start-up funding from the Zale Corporation, which allowed for an expansion of the program to San Antonio.

== Premise ==
The basis of the program is Dr. Bronfenrenner's (1979) observations of the impact of environmental factors on human development. This research suggested that factors external to the family were constraints to escaping from poverty cycles, and the research aimed to provide model for intervention. The Parent-Child Education Program, adopted by AVANCE, focuses on the role of both parent and child. It assists parents by providing a stable home environment improving the parents' language and work skills, their parenting knowledge, and increasing their awareness of community services.

== Parent-Child Education Program ==
The principal program AVANCE promotes is the Parent-Child Education Program. This aims to help parents create a cognitively rich environment. Teachers seek to do this by encouraging parents to stimulate their children's development through talking to them, praising them and interacting with the world around them. The New York Times referred to the goal of AVANCE as "Teaching mothers how to teach their children." The program is structured in two tiers, with the first addressing the child's basic needs, such as food, clothing, shelter, and medical services. The second stage focuses on the parents' educational needs, where applicable, with the aim of improving the home environment and parents' employment options.

The Parent-Child Education Program consists of weekly three-hour classes that are designed to mirror the local school calendar and comprises curricula based on Play and Toys, Parenting Education, Home Visits, and Community Resource Awareness. The average participant in the program is a low-income Hispanic mother in her mid-twenties, with 2-3 children. However, it also includes fathers, grandparents and primary guardians or caregivers of children up to three years of age. The majority of participants possess no higher than a ninth-grade education and limited or no work experience. A core tenet of the program is to provide practical support in order to encourage parental participation by arranging transport to and from program services, providing free meals, and employing bilingual staff from the same communities as participants. Individuals are not charged for participating in the program.

== Assessment of effectiveness ==
The effectiveness of the Parent-Child Education Program was evaluated over a four-year period, from 1987 to 1991 with support from the Carnegie Corporation of New York. The evaluation studied a group of 486 individuals, comprising 207 participants in the AVANCE program and 279 in a control group. The data collected related to maternal knowledge, behavior, attitudes and continuing education. The study continued over a two-year period and concluded that "most of the program goals were attained to an impressive degree." It found the two-generation Parent-Child Education Program for low-income families to be beneficial in such aspects as the home learning environment, maternal behaviors and attitudes towards children. A review of the program in Early Childhood Education Journal found that children in the AVANCE-Dallas chapter academically outperformed their peers. In the 2005 TAKS (Texas Assessment of Knowledge and Skills), 88% of child graduates met the passing standard for reading, compared with 73% in the Dallas Independent School District and 83% in the state.

A 1991 survey of 23 women and 32 children who had participated in AVANCE's first program group showed that 94% of those children had completed high school, received a General Equivalency Diploma (GED) or were still in education. In addition, 57% of the mothers who had previously dropped out of school went back and resumed studies, subsequently attaining a GED.

As part of a 1994 report into the state of care for children in U.S., the Carnegie Corporation commented on the AVANCE programs: "Evaluations show that Avance (sic) programs improve families' ability to provide an emotionally stimulating and nurturing environment for their young children, positively influence mothers' childrearing attitudes and knowledge, and expand mother's use of community resources." This was at a time, the report continued, when three million children, comprising almost 25% of all American infants and toddlers, lived in poverty.

Dr. Susan B. Neuman investigated AVANCE's Parent-Child Education program as part of research into early intervention initiatives. She is Professor in Educational Studies at the University of Michigan, a former U.S. Assistant Secretary of Elementary and Secondary Education, and was primarily responsible for implementing the No Child Left Behind Act. The AVANCE program was one of nine non-school intervention initiatives that Dr. Neuman examined. She found high performance levels for children who had participated in the program. 100% of children scored excellent or satisfactory on the Dallas school district's kindergarten test of pre-reading skills. Dr. Neuman concluded that AVANCE and the other programs demonstrated "impressive results".

== External recognition ==
In 2009 AVANCE was awarded the E Pluribus Unum Prize, presented by the Migration Policy Institute's National Center on Immigration Integration Policy. This award is given in recognition of initiatives that help immigrants and their children to adapt and contribute to the United States. In January 2012, AVANCE was awarded the Simmons Luminary Award for education excellence by Southern Methodist University.

The work of the organization has been commented upon by former First Ladies, Hillary Clinton, Rosalynn Carter and Barbara Bush, in relation to education. In a 1999 forum on educational initiatives and issues held in Washington, D.C., Clinton described AVANCE as "...one of the most effective home-building programs of support. If you're not familiar with it, you should see it and read about it." She also referenced the organization in her book, It Takes a Village. Rosalynn Carter, in discussing the effectiveness of several organizations in the promotion of mental well-being, described AVANCE as one of those programs which "...have in common efforts to reduce the risk factors that can contribute to mental illness while they enhance protective factors that can help keep our children well." Separately, The Barbara Bush Foundation for Family Literacy recognized AVANCE among ten innovative family literacy programs that focused on early intervention.

The organization was also included in a 1997 book and photographic exhibition called Pursuing the Dream, a joint venture between photographer Stephen Shames and the Family Resource Coalition (FRC). This was the culmination of a two-year photographic record that Shames created depicting community programs serving disadvantaged youth and families and helping them achieve financial and emotional stability.

AVANCE was ranked by Hispanic Business Magazine as one of the top 25 non-profit organizations supporting Hispanic people in the U.S. in 2011.

== Funding ==
AVANCE operates through donations from business organizations and individuals. In addition, AVANCE receives donations from churches, food banks, schools, government agencies, social and civic groups. Some universities also allow the organization to use their campuses for graduation ceremonies.
