= Harrison Clark =

Harrison Clark may refer to:

- Harrison Clark (Medal of Honor), American Civil War soldier
- Harrison Clark (footballer), English footballer
