= List of horror films of 1973 =

A list of horror films released in 1973.

Title	Director(s)	Cast	Country	Notes	Ref.
A Cold Night's Death	Jerrold Freedman	Robert Culp, Eli Wallach, Michael C. Gwynne	United States	Television film	
Alabama's Ghost	Fredric Hobbs	Christopher Brooks	United States		
And Now the Screaming Starts!	Roy Ward Baker	Peter Cushing, Herbert Lom, Patrick Magee	United Kingdom	aka Fengriffen	
At the Meeting with Joyous Death	Juan Buñuel	Jean-Marc Bory, Françoise Fabian, Yasmine Dahm	France; Italy		
Baba Yaga	Corrado Farina	Carroll Baker, Isabelle De Funès, George Eastman	France; Italy		
The Baby	Ted Post	Marianna Hill, Tod Andrews, Anjanette Comer	United States		
The Bell from Hell	Claudio Guerin Hill	Christine Betzner	Spain	aka La campana del infierno	
Blackenstein	William A. Levey	James Cougar, Joe di Sue, John Hart	United States		
Blood Orgy of the She-Devils	Ted V. Mikels	Lila Zaborin, Victor Izay, Tom Pace	United States		
The Boy Who Cried Werewolf	Nathan Juran	Paul R. Baxley Jr., Dave Cass	United States		
The Bride	Jean-Marie Pélissié	Robin Strasser, Arthur Roberts, John Beal	United States	Alternative title(s): The House That Cried Murder; Last House on Massacre Street	
A Candle for the Devil	Eugenio Martín	Judy Geeson, Aurora Bautista	Spain	Alternative title(s): It Happened at Nightmare Inn	
Cannibal Girls	Ivan Reitman	Bonnie Neilson, Eugene Levy, Andrea Martin	Canada		
Case of the Full Moon Murders	Sean S. Cunningham	Sheila Stuart, Fred J. Lincoln	United States		
The Crazies	George A. Romero	Edith Bell, Lane Carroll, Will Disney	United States		
The Creeping Flesh	Freddie Francis	Christopher Lee, Peter Cushing	United Kingdom		
Dark Places	Don Sharp	Christopher Lee, Joan Collins, Robert Hardy	United Kingdom		
Death Smiles on a Murderer	Joe D'Amato	Ewa Aulin, Klaus Kinski	Italy		
The Demons	Jesús Franco	Josiane Gibert, Britt Nichols, Howard Vernon, Cihangir Ghaffari	France; Portugal		
The Devil's Wedding Night	Luigi Batzella, Joe D'Amato	Mark Damon, Rosalba Neri, Esmeralda Barros	Italy		
Doctor Death: Seeker of Souls	Eddie Saeta	John Considine, Sivi Aberg, Leon Askin	United States		
Don't Be Afraid of the Dark	John Newland	Kim Darby, Jim Hutton	United States	Television film	
Don't Look in the Basement	S. F. Brownrigg	Bill McGhee, Jessie Lee Fulton, Robert Dracup	United States	Alternative title(s): The Forgotten	
Don't Look Now	Nicolas Roeg	Donald Sutherland, Julie Christie	United Kingdom; Italy		
Dying Room Only	Philip Leacock	Cloris Leachman, Ross Martin, Ned Beatty, Dabney Coleman	United States	Television film	
Encounter with the Unknown	Harry Thomason		United States		
El Retorno de Walpurgis	Carlos Aured	Jacinto Molina, Maritza Olivares	Spain Mexico	Alternative title(s): Curse of the Devil; The Black Harvest of Countess Dracula	
The Exorcist	William Friedkin	Ellen Burstyn, Linda Blair, Max von Sydow	United States	First film of The Exorcist franchise	
Female Vampire	Jesús Franco	Lina Romay, Monica Swinn, Luis Barboo	Belgium; France	aka The Bare-Breasted Countess	
Flesh for Frankenstein	Paul Morrissey	Joe Dallesandro, Udo Kier, Monique Van Vooren	Italy; France		
Florinda	Armando A. Herrera	Susan Roces, Dante Rivero, Ramil Rodriguez, Rosemarie Gil	Philippines		
Frankenstein	Glenn Jordan	Robert Foxworth, Susan Strasberg, Bo Svenson	United States		
Frankenstein: The True Story	Jack Smight	Leonard Whiting, Jane Seymour	United Kingdom; United States	Television film	
Ganja & Hess	Bill Gunn	Tara Fields, Enrico Fales	United States		
Godmonster of Indian Flats	Fredric Hobbs	Peggy Browne, Robert Hirschfeld, Karen Ingenthron	United States		
The Hanging Woman	José Luis Merino	Paul Naschy, Stelvio Riso	Italy; Spain	aka La orgia de los muertos, Terror of the Living Dead	
Hannah, Queen of the Vampires	Julio Salvador	Andrew Prine, Mark Damon, Patty Shepard	Spain; United States	Alternative title(s): La tumba de la isla maldita; Crypt of the Living Dead; Young Hanna, Queen Of The Vampires; Vampire Woman	
The Hidan of Maukbeiangjow	Lee Jones	David Roster, Paul Lenzi, Harlo Cayse	United States		
Hollywood 90028	Christina Hornisher	Christopher Augustine, Jeannette Dilge	United States	Alternative title(s): The Hollywood Hillside Strangler; Twisted Throats	
Horror Hospital	Anthony Balch	Robin Askwith, Ellen Pollock, Martin Grace	United Kingdom		
The House That Vanished	José Ramón Larraz	Andrea Allan, Karl Lanchbury, Judy Matheson	United Kingdom	Alternative title(s): Scream...and Die!; Please! Don't Go in the Bedroom	
The Iron Rose	Jean Rollin	Françoise Pascal, Hugues Quester, Mireille Dargent	France		
Isn't It Shocking?	John Badham	Alan Alda, Louise Lasser, Edmond O'Brien, Lloyd Nolan, Will Geer, Ruth Gordon	United States	Television film	
The Legend of Blood Castle	Jorge Grau	Lucia Bosè, Ewa Aulin, Espartaco Santoni	Spain; Italy	aka Ceremonia Sangrienta, Female Butcher	
The Legend of Hell House	John Hough	Pamela Franklin, Roddy McDowall, Clive Revill	United Kingdom		
Lemora	Richard Blackburn	Cheryl Smith	United States	Alternative title(s): The Legendary Curse of Lemora; Lemora, Lady Dracula	
Leptirica	Đorđe Kadijević	Petar Božović, Mirjana Nikolić, Vasja Stanković	Yugoslavia		
The Loreley's Grasp	Armando de Ossorio	Tony Kendall, Helga Liné	Spain		
Malatesta's Carnival of Blood	Christopher Speeth	Lenny Baker, Jerome Dempsey	United States		
Maneater	Vince Edwards	Ben Gazzara, Sheree North, Richard Basehart	United States	Television film	
The Mansion of Madness	Juan López Moctezuma	Claudio Brook, Robert Dumont	Mexico	aka Dr. Tarr's Torture Dungeon	
Mark of the Devil Part II	Adrian Hoven	Erika Blanc, Anton Diffring	Germany		
Messiah of Evil	Willard Huyck, Gloria Katz	Dyanne Asimow, Marianna Hill, Joy Bang	United States		
A Name for Evil	Bernard Girard	Robert Culp, Samantha Eggar	United States		
The Night Strangler	Dan Curtis	Darren McGavin, Simon Oakland, Richard Anderson	United States	Television film	
Night Watch	Brian G. Hutton	Elizabeth Taylor, Laurence Harvey, Billie Whitelaw	United Kingdom; United States		
The Norliss Tapes	Dan Curtis	Roy Thinnes, Angie Dickinson	United States	Television film	
Nothing But the Night	Peter Sasdy	Christopher Lee, Peter Cushing, Diana Dors, Michael Gambon	United Kingdom		
Psychomania	Don Sharp	Nicky Henson, Mary Larkin, Ann Michelle	United Kingdom	Alternative title(s): The Death Wheelers	
The Pyx	Harvey Hart	Karen Black, Christopher Plummer	Canada	Alternative title(s): The Hooker Cult Murders	
Reincarnation of Isabel	Renato Polselli	Mickey Hargitay, Rita Calderoni, Christa Barrymore	Italy	aka Riti, magie nere e segrete orge nel trecento	
Return of the Blind Dead	Amando De Ossorio	Frank Blake, José Canalejas	Spain; Portugal	Alternative title(s): Return of the Evil Dead	
The Return of Walpurgis	Carlos Aured	Paul Naschy, Eduardo Calvo, Patty Shepard	Spain; Mexico	Alternative title(s): Curse of the Devil	
The Satanic Rites of Dracula	Alan Gibson	Christopher Lee, Peter Cushing, Joanna Lumley	United Kingdom		
Satan's School for Girls	David Lowell Rich	Pamela Franklin, Gwynne Gilford, Jamie Smith Jackson	United States		
Schlock	John Landis	Joseph Piantadosi, Eliza Roberts, Saul Kahan	United States		
Scream Blacula Scream	Bob Kelljan	William Marshall, Pam Grier	United States		
Scream Bloody Murder	Marc B. Ray	Fred Holbert	United States		
Seven Deaths in the Cat's Eye	Anthony M. Dawson (Antonio Margheriti)	Jane Birkin, Françoise Christophe, Venantino Venantini	Italy; West Germany		
So Sad About Gloria	Harry Thomason	Lori Saunders, Robert Ginnaven, Dean Jagger	United States	Alternative title(s): Visions of Evil	
Sssssss	Bernard Kowalski	Ray Ballard, Rick Beckner	United States		
Tales That Witness Madness	Freddie Francis	Donald Pleasence, Joan Collins, Kim Novak, Jack Hawkins	United Kingdom		
Terror in the Wax Museum	Georg Fenady	Ray Milland, Elsa Lanchester, Maurice Evans, John Carradine	United States		
Theatre of Blood	Douglas Hickox	Vincent Price, Diana Rigg	United Kingdom		
Torso	Sergio Martino	Suzy Kendall, Tina Aumont	Italy	Alternative title(s): The Bodies Bear Traces of Carnal Violence	
Vampires Night Orgy	León Klimovsky	Jack Taylor, Dianik Zurakowska	Italy; Spain		
Vault of Horror	Roy Ward Baker	Terry-Thomas, Denholm Elliott, Tom Baker	United Kingdom		
Vengeance of the Zombies	León Klimovsky	Mirta Miller, Jacinto Molina, Rommy	Spain	aka La rebelión de las muertas	
A Virgin Among the Living Dead	Jesús Franco	Howard Vernon, Paul Müller, Brit Nichols	France; Italy; Spain; Liechtenstein	filmed in 1971	
The Werewolf of Washington	Milton Moses Ginsberg	Nancy Andrews, Dean Stockwell, Despo Diamantidou	United States		
The Wicker Man	Robin Hardy	Edward Woodward, Britt Ekland, Diane Cilento	United Kingdom		

== Sources ==
- Albright, Brian (2012). Regional Horror Films, 1958-1990: A State-by-State Guide with Interviews. Jefferson, North Carolina: McFarland. ISBN 978-1-476-60042-0.
- Chibnall, Steve; Petley, Julian, eds. (2002). British Horror Cinema. New York City, New York: Routledge. ISBN 978-0-415-23003-2.
- Cooper, Ian (2016). Frightmares: A History of British Horror Cinema. New York City, New York: Columbia University Press. ISBN 978-0-993-07174-4.
- Curti, Roberto (2017). Italian Gothic Horror Films, 1970–1979. McFarland. ISBN 978-1476629605.
- Deal, David (2007). Television Fright Films of the 1970s. Jefferson, North Carolina: McFarland. ISBN 978-0-786-42929-5.
- Hardy, Phil, ed. (1995). The Overlook Film Encyclopedia. Vol. 3. Overlook Press. ISBN 0-87951-624-0.
- Muir, John Kenneth (2007). Horror Films of the 1970s. Jefferson, North Carolina: McFarland. ISBN 978-0-786-49156-8.
- Schlegel, Nicholas G. (2015). Sex, Sadism, Spain, and Cinema: The Spanish Horror Film. Rowman & Littlefield. ISBN 978-1-442-25116-8.
- Smith, Gary A (2017). Vampire Films of the 1970s: Dracula to Blacula and Every Fang Between. McFarland. ISBN 978-1476625591.
- Young, R. G. (2000). The Encyclopedia of Fantastic Film: Ali Baba to Zombies. Hal Leonard Corporation. ISBN 1-55783-269-2.
