= Gate, Fence and Hollow Tree Shelter Designed by Dionicio Rodriguez =

- U.S. National Register of Historic Places
- NM State Register of Cultural Properties
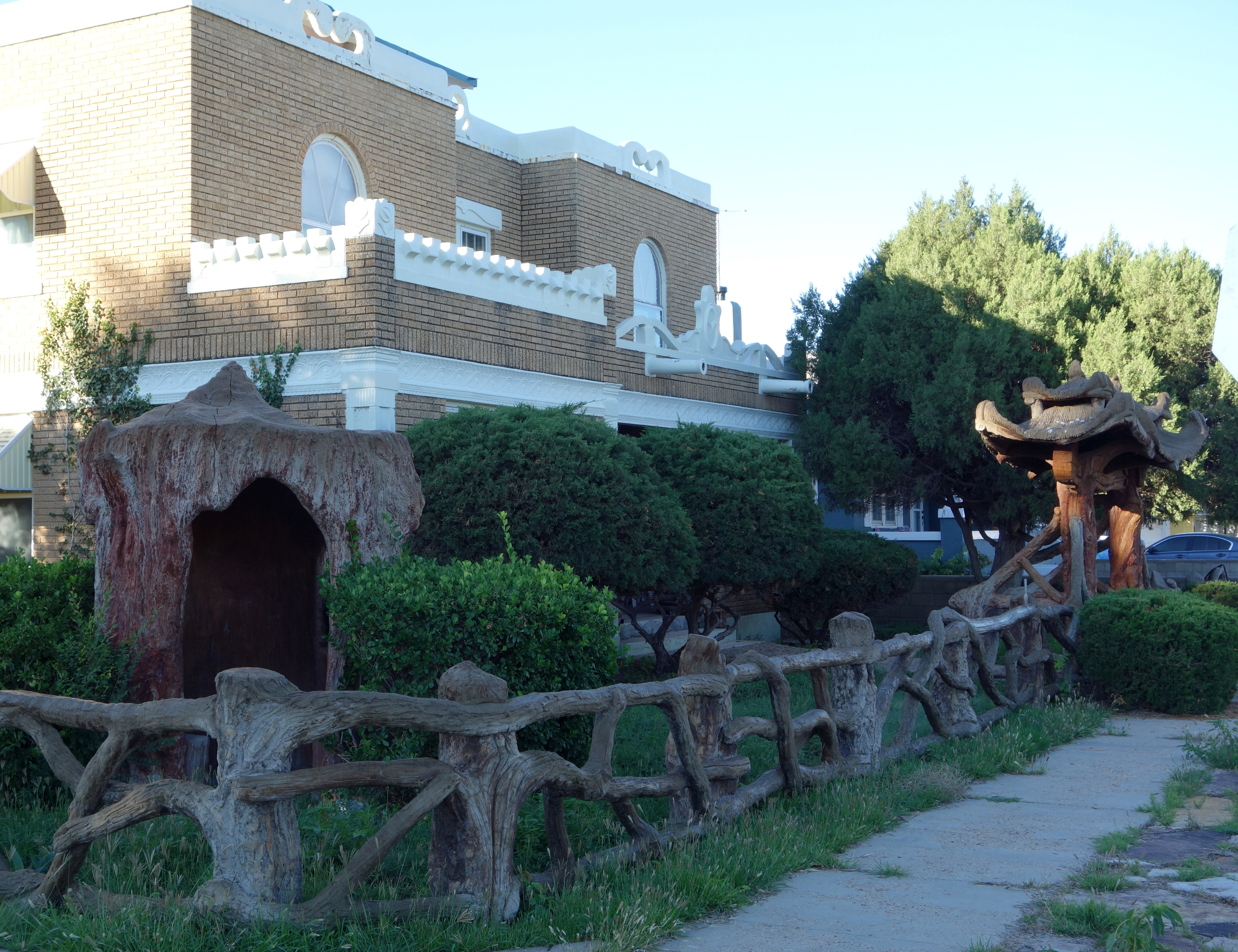
- The shelter, fence, and gate

- Location within New Mexico
- Location: 320 Oak St., Clayton, New Mexico
- Coordinates: 36°27′7″N 103°10′49″W
- Area: less than one acre
- Built: 1943
- Architect: Dionicio Rodriguez
- Architectural style: Faux bois sculpture
- NRHP reference No.: 08001138
- NMSRCP No.: 1927

Significant dates
- Added to NRHP: November 25, 2008
- Designated NMSRCP: April 4, 2008

The Gate, Fence and Hollow Tree Shelter Designed by Dionicio Rodriguez is a work by noted artist Dionicio Rodriguez that is located at 320 Oak St. in Clayton, New Mexico. It consists of three faux bois sculptures created in 1943. Speculator Bayliss C. Froman commissioned the sculptures on his property after seeing Rodriguez's work on a visit to San Antonio. The sculptures include a gate resembling the entrance to the San Antonio Japanese Tea Garden, an intertwining log fence, and a hollow tree with textured bark.

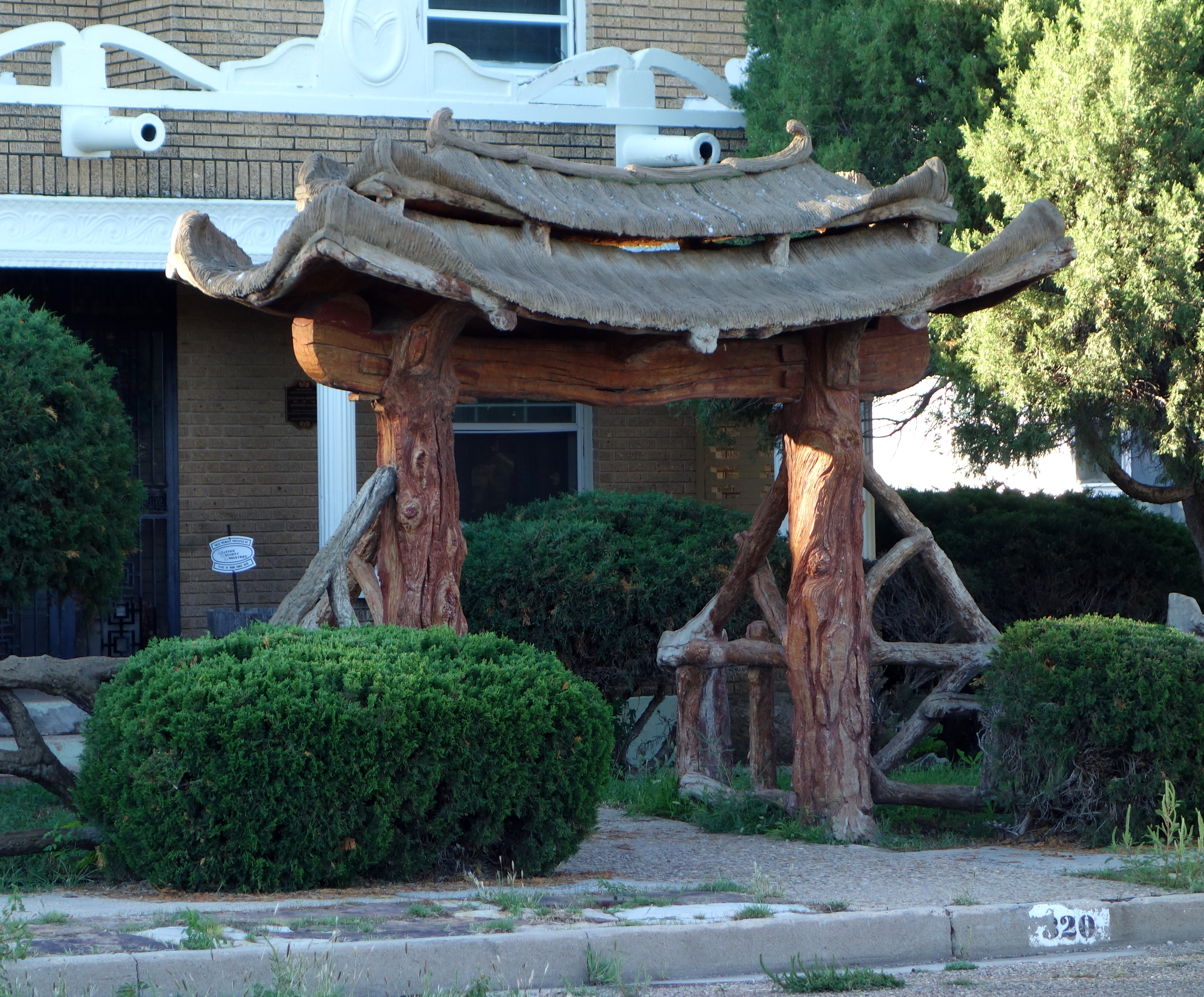
Closeup of the gate

== See also ==
- National Register of Historic Places listings in Union County, New Mexico
