= Fence at Alamo Cement Company =

- U.S. National Register of Historic Places
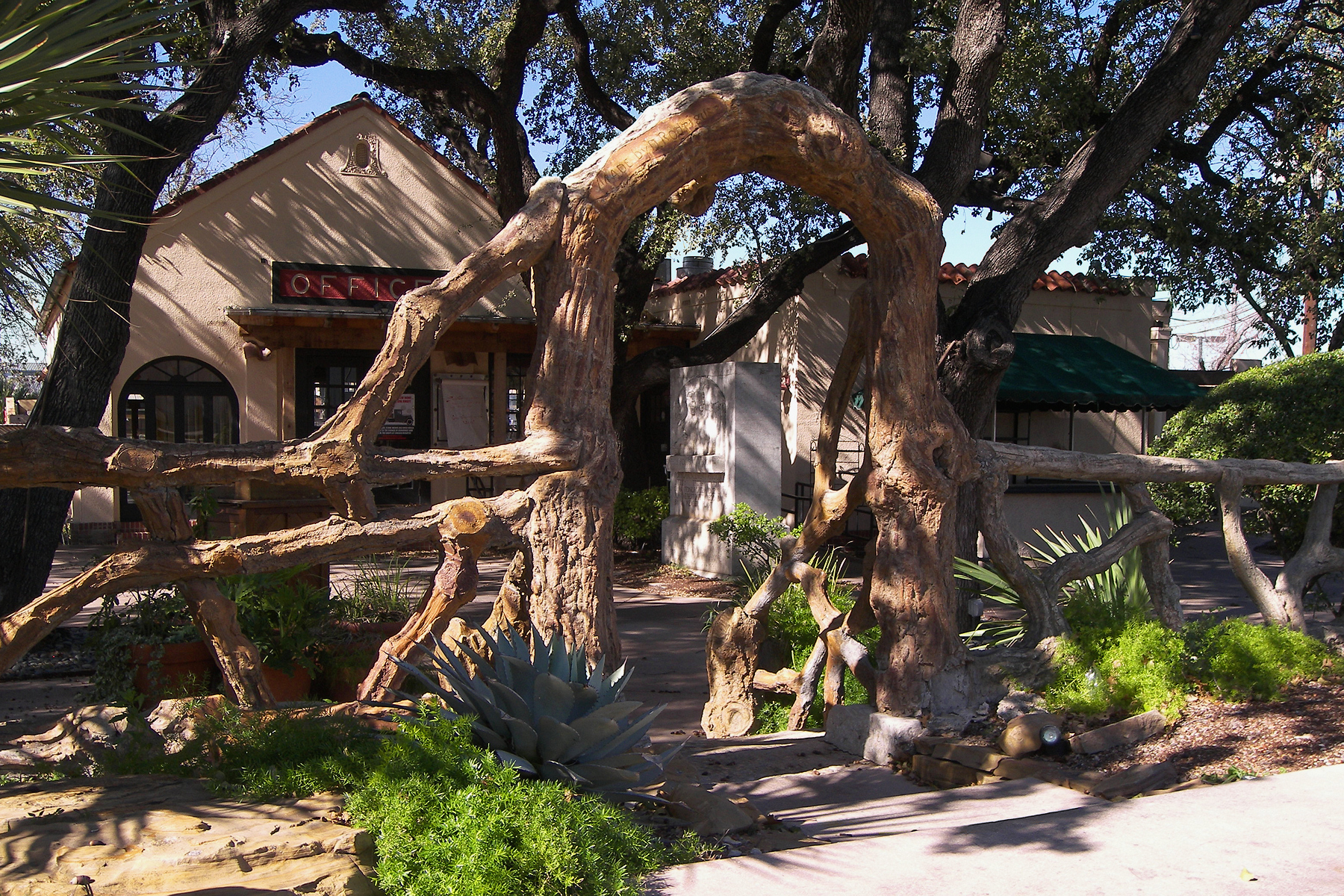

- Location within Texas Location within the United States
- Location: 7300 Jones Maltsberger Rd; San Antonio, Texas
- Coordinates: 29°29′51″N 98°28′44″W
- Built: 1926
- Architect: Dionicio Rodriguez
- NRHP reference No.: 05000861
- Added to NRHP: August 9, 2005

The Fence at Alamo Cement Company is a Faux Bois sculpture by artist Dionicio Rodriguez. The sculpture is a 125-foot-long concrete faux wood fence laid out in approximately a “C” shape and features an elaborate entrance way formed by two sculpted tree trunks. The sculpture was posted to the National Register of Historic Places on August 9, 2005.
