= So Sad About Gloria =

- Theatrical poster
- Directed by: Harry Thomason
- Screenplay by: Marshall Riggan
- Story by: Joe Glass; Harry Thomason; Mike Varner
- Produced by: Harry Thomason
- Starring: Lori Saunders; Robert Ginnaven; Dean Jagger
- Cinematography: Robert Dracup; James W. Roberson
- Edited by: Hank Gotzenberg
- Music by: Hank Levine
- Production company: Centronics International
- Distributed by: Libra Films
- Release date: July 1973
- Running time: 90 minutes
- Country: United States
- Language: English

So Sad About Gloria, also known as Visions of Evil is a 1973 American independent horror film directed by Harry Thomason and starring Lori Saunders, Robert Ginnaven, and Dean Jagger. Its plot follows a mentally unstable woman after release from a mental institution for suffering a breakdown due to repression of witnessing her father's murder when a child.

== Plot ==
A young woman, Gloria Wellman, is picked up by her uncle, Frederick, as she's released from a mental hospital. She occasionally zones out, fantasizing about a man in black axing the chains and lock of a coffin.

Janie Mylan, a friend from school and college, visits Gloria at her mansion. Elaine mentions Gloria was away for three years, traveling abroad, since they last met.

These visions are then, somewhat confusingly, mixed in with a flashback to the axe murder of another woman, Linda Gaines, in the house that Gloria later moves into with her new husband, Chris Kenner, a man she met trespassing on her estate and married after a short romance.

On a prowler call, police almost catch the intruder at the house Gloria and Chris are about to move into. Though the police manage to fire a few shots, they quickly give up, blowing off the matter as merely a homeless person, a "wino." Despite remembering Linda's murder, they oddly don't consider the prowler could have been Linda's murderer.

In parallel, another man, Mr. Ballinger, is often trespassing on the grounds of their new house, chopping wood unsolicited and offering to help out in any other way.

Janie visits the new house, and recalls a prank she pulled on Gloria that drew such a reaction that she subsequently felt guilty. Gloria occasionally hears a music box, though Chris claims he hears nothing, which makes Gloria worry that she is relapsing.

Chris is away for work one night, to deliver his finished novel. Frederick claims he can't get to her house for dinner as scheduled. Gloria now hears the music box again. Worse, Mr. Ballinger is lurking about, knows too much about her husband being away, and insists on coming inside to deliver chopped wood. After Ballinger leaves, an axe wielder in a mask breaks into her bedroom and swings the axe at her over and over, stopping only when he hears Frederick at the front door.

At the front door, the axe wielder meets Frederick, who is strangely unafraid. Chris reveals himself from under the mask. Frederick is wracked with guilt and wants none of the money from their plot to drive Gloria crazy. Chris ends the partnership by killing Frederick. We learn later that Gloria is blamed for her uncle's murder.

Gloria's doctor tells Chris she is catatonic and will likely have to be in the hospital for the rest of her life. Chris returns to the house to collect some things, including a tape recorder that plays the music he claimed he could not hear. An axe wielder—perhaps the prowler from an earlier scene, perhaps the axe murderer of Linda—then kills Chris, thus exonerating Gloria of Frederick's murder.

== Cast ==
- Lori Saunders as Gloria Wellman
- Robert Ginnaven as Chris Kenner
- Dean Jagger as Fredrick Wellman
- Lou Hoffman as the Psychiatrist
- Seymour Treitman as Mr. Ballinger
- Linda Wyse as Janie Mylan
- Melanie Wadkins as Mary
- George Stewart as Man in Dream
- Brenda Evans as Linda Gaines
- Etta Jagger as Nurse
- John Brown as Alex
- Joe Barone as Axe Killer

== Production ==
The film was shot on location in 1972 in the Ozarks region of Arkansas, as well as a number of locations in Little Rock and central Arkansas, including Crestview Park, Lakewood Park, and T. R. Pugh Memorial Park in North Little Rock (Pulaski County).

When the movie premiered regionally, ads included a local telephone number to find out more about the movie. Instead, calls were answered with a recording of Gloria begging for help before the phone went dead.
