= T. R. Pugh Memorial Park =

- U.S. National Register of Historic Places
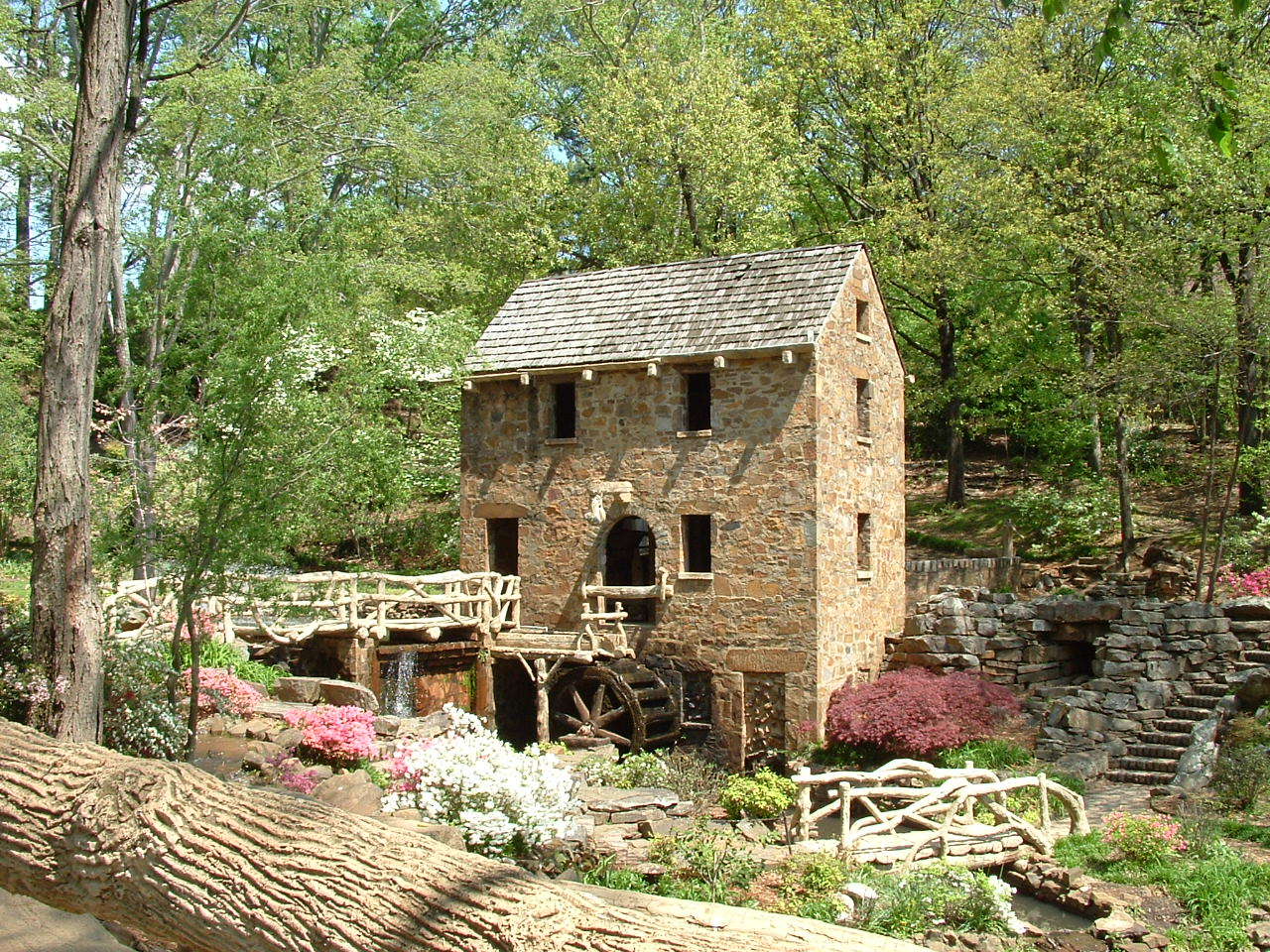
- The Old Mill

- Location within Arkansas Location within the United States
- Location: 3800 Lakeshore Dr., Near the junction of Fairway Ave. and Lakeshore Dr., North Little Rock, Arkansas
- Coordinates: 34°47′30″N 92°14′57″W
- Area: nearly one acre
- Built: 1931
- Built by: Justin Matthews
- Architect: Frank Carmean & Dionicio Rodriguez
- NRHP reference No.: 86003585
- Added to NRHP: 1986

T. R. Pugh Memorial Park (or The Old Mill) is a re-creation of an 1880s era water-powered grist mill located in North Little Rock, Arkansas. It was used in the opening scenes of the movie classic Gone With The Wind. In 2010, the site was listed on the National Register of Historic Places.

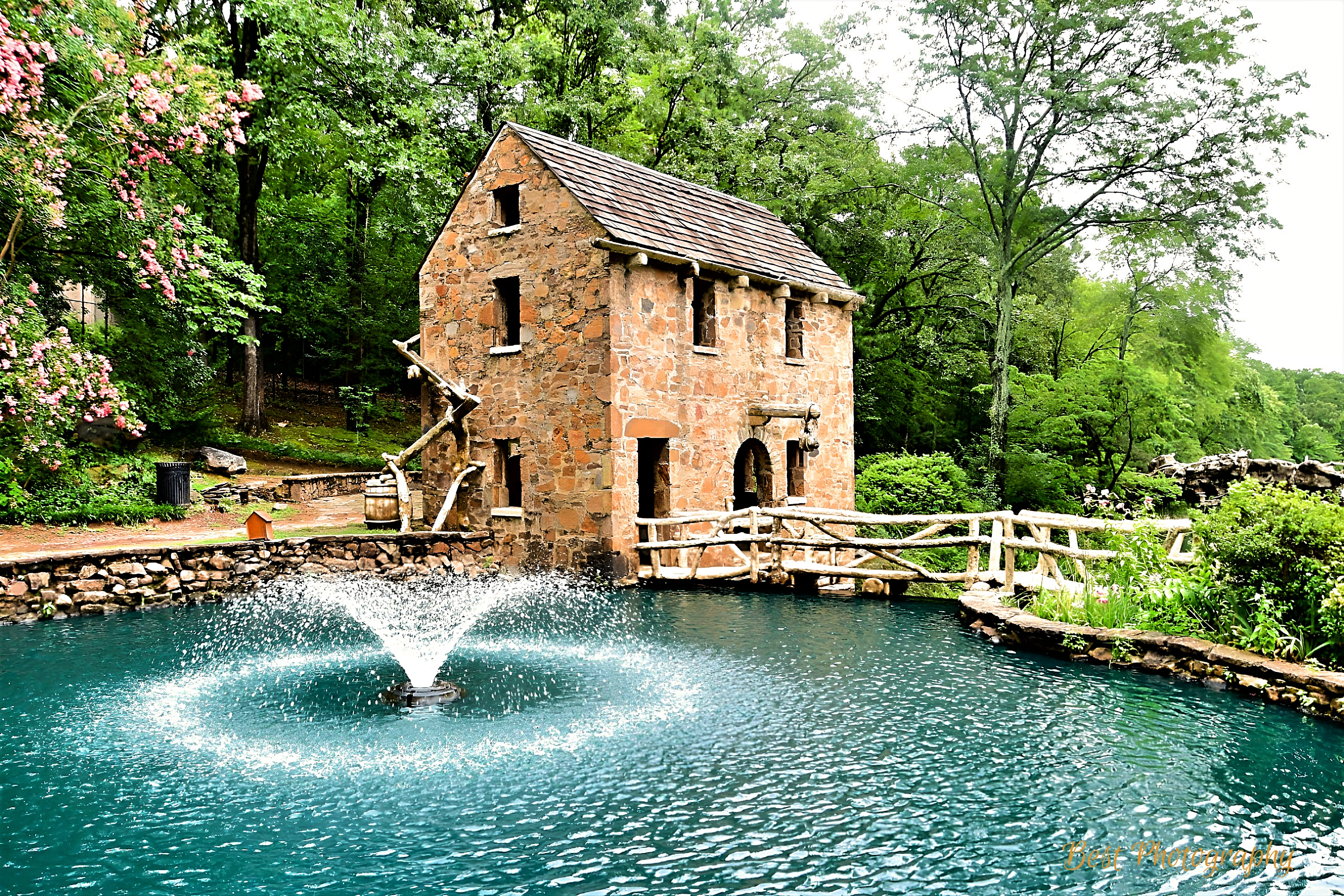
The Old Mill

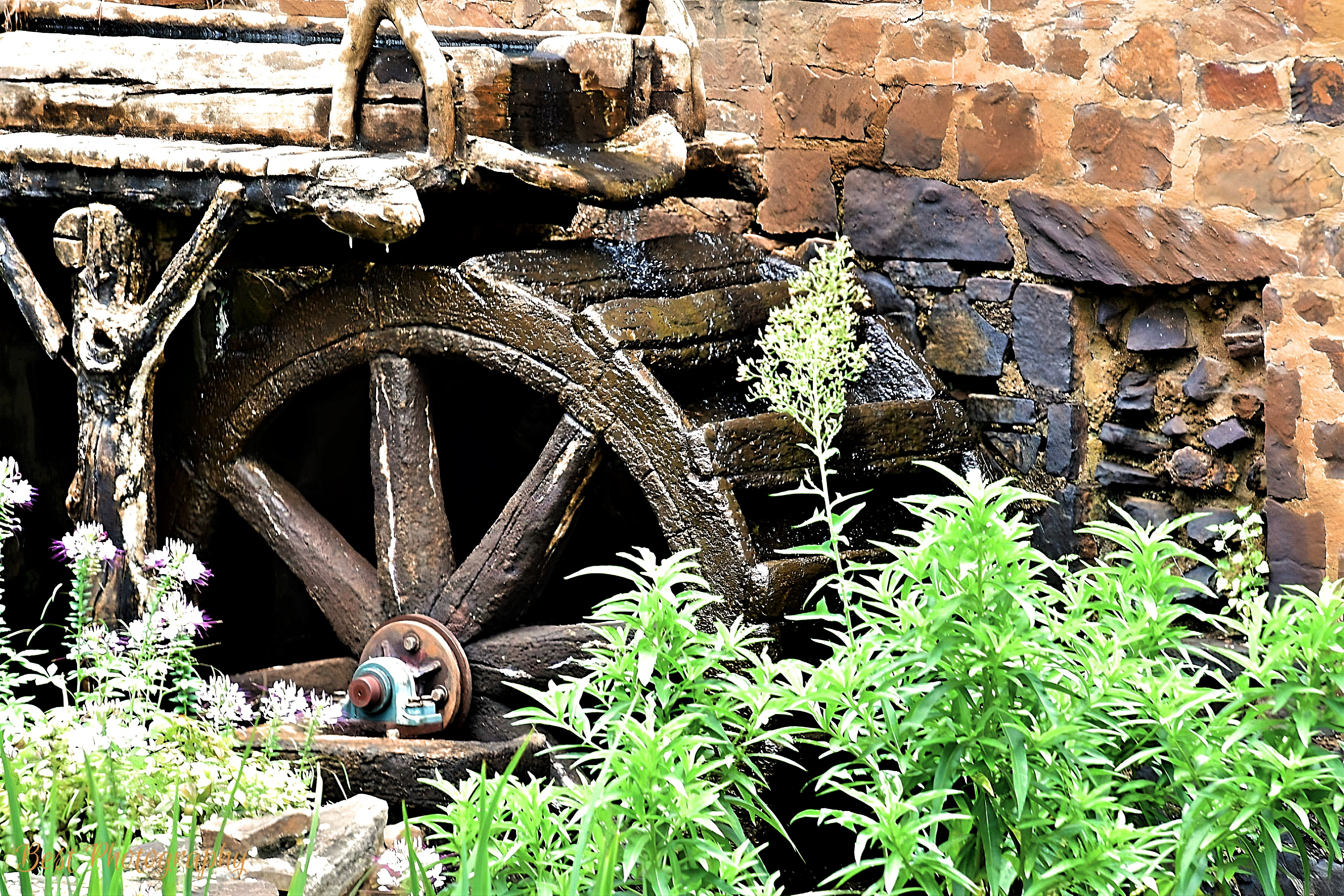
The Old Mill

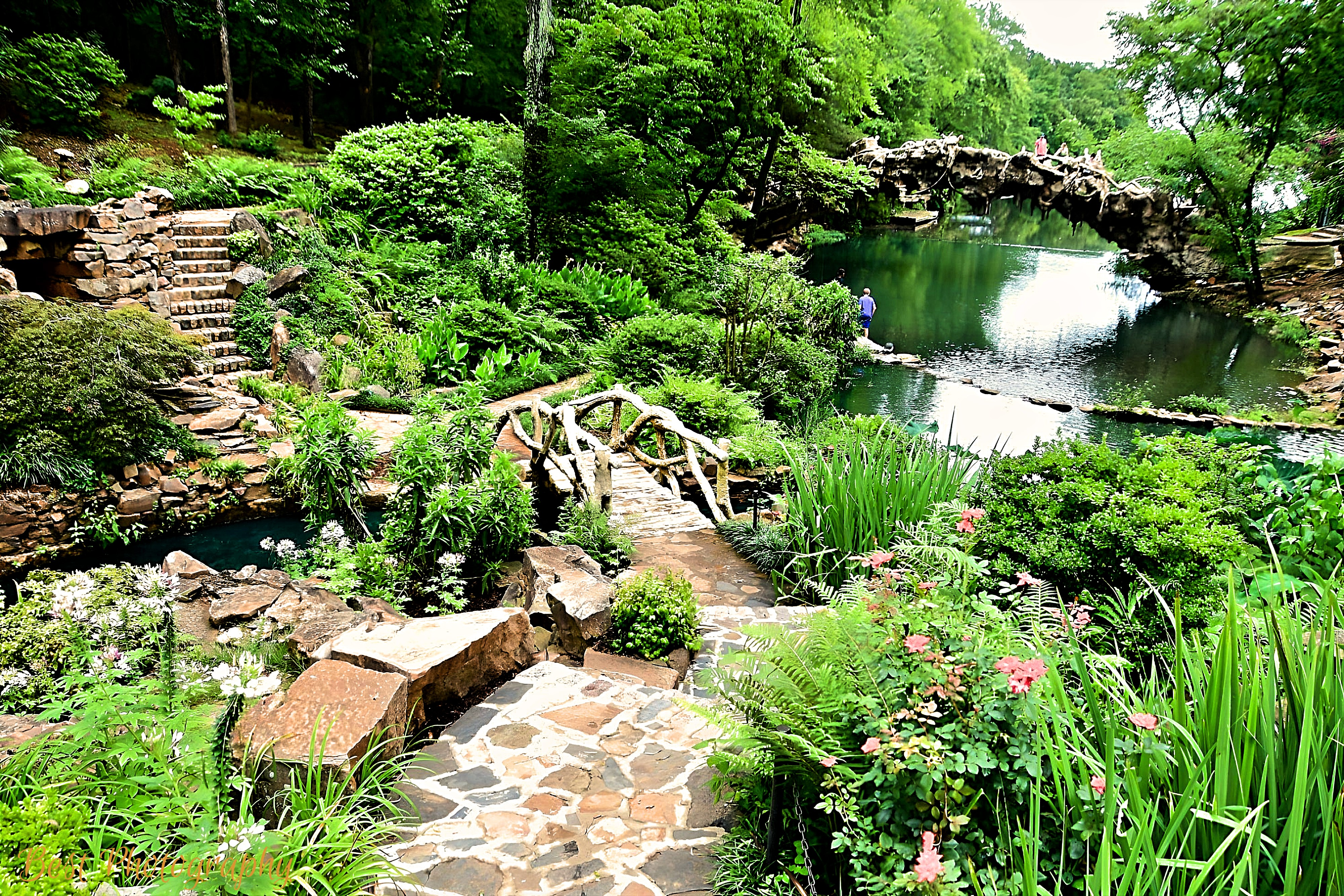
T. R. Pugh Memorial Park

The park was built in 1933 by Justin Matthews and named in honor of Thomas R. Pugh, of Portland, Arkansas, who was a close friend and benefactor of Matthews. The park was developed as a tourist attraction for the nearby Park Hill and Lakewood subdivisions, also built by Matthews. The architect for the park and the mill was Frank Carmean with artist Dionicio Rodriguez serving as sculptor of the concrete work to simulate wooden, iron, and steel structures in a style known as faux bois, or fake wood.

Several elements within the Old Mill are original to the time period the park depicts. An iron gristmill on the first floor was donated by the Cagle family of Pope County, Arkansas from their family mill and is dated 1828.

In the present day, the Old Mill serves as the backdrop for weddings and portrait photography.

In 2008, the roof was set on fire, but no permanent damage resulted.

== See also ==
- National Register of Historic Places listings in Pulaski County, Arkansas
- Plaque #44726 on Open Plaques
