= Aviary at the Houston Zoo =

- U.S. National Register of Historic Places
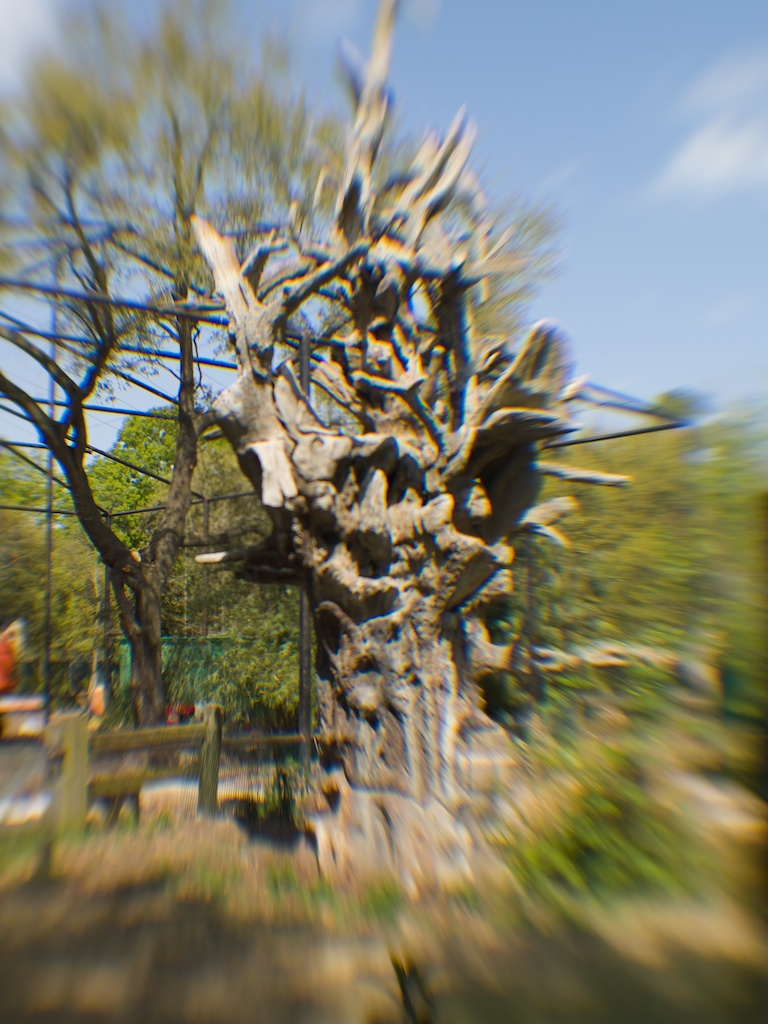
- Faux bois tree sculpture at the Aviary at the Houston Zoo

- Location within Texas Location within the United States
- Location: 1513 N. McGregor, Houston, Texas
- Coordinates: 29°42′59″N 95°23′31″W
- Area: less than one acre
- Built: 1926
- Architect: Rodriguez, Dionicio
- Architectural style: Faux bois sculpture
- MPS: Sculpture by Dionicio Rodriguez in Texas MPS
- NRHP reference No.: 05000858
- Added to NRHP: August 9, 2005

The Aviary at the Houston Zoo is a historic work of art created by Mexican-born architect and artist Dionicio Rodriguez located at the Houston Zoo in Houston, Texas, and listed on the National Register of Historic Places. The faux bois sculptures were built in 1926 and dubbed the "flying sculpture". Although Hurricane Carla destroyed the aviary's wire superstructure in 1961, Rodriguez's sculptures remain and are composed of a tree, a fountain, logs, ledges and rock bordering a shallow pond which are now part of the flamingo habitat at the zoo.
