= Fountain at Alamo Cement Company =

- U.S. National Register of Historic Places
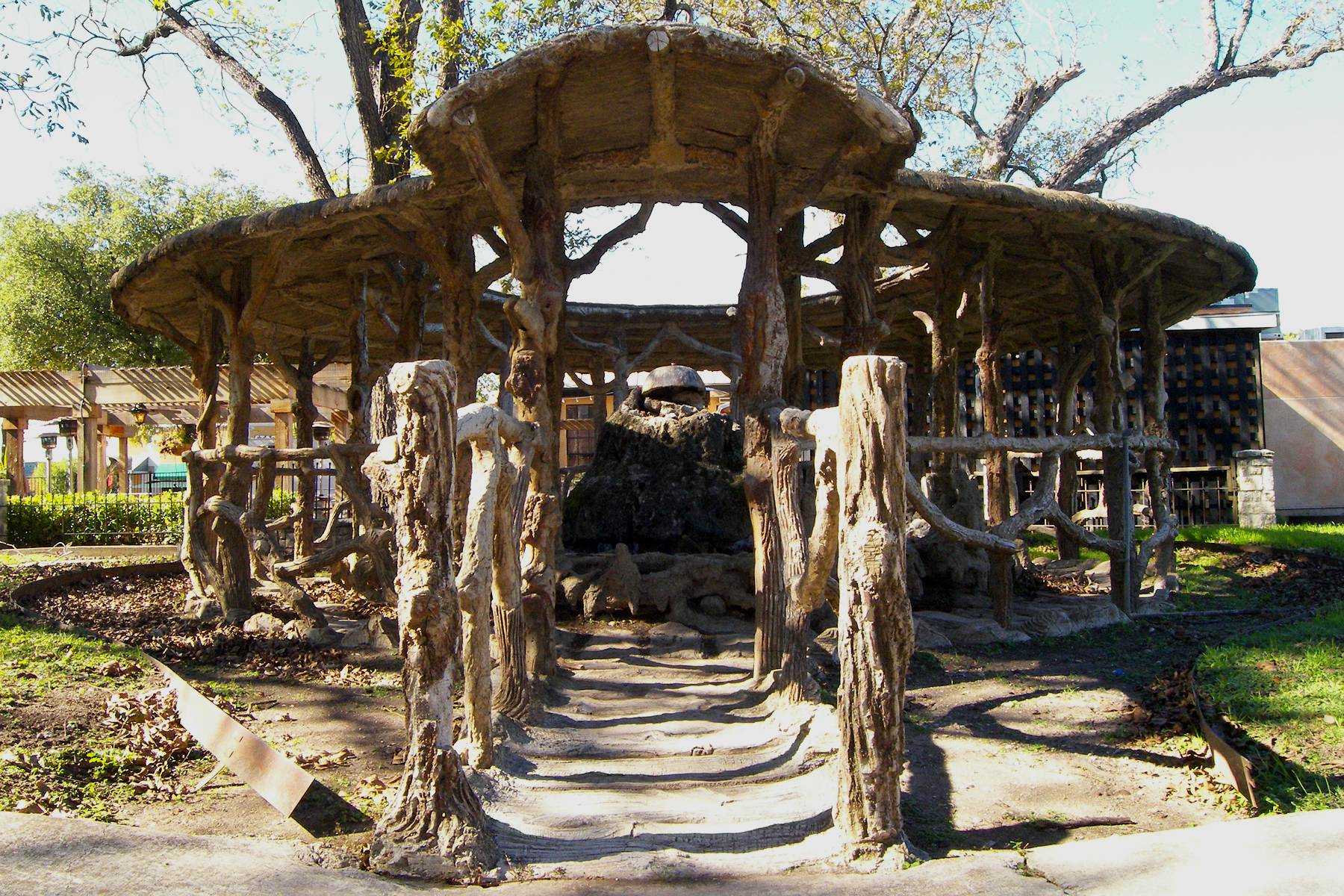

- Location within Texas Location within the United States
- Location: 7300 Jones Maltsberger Rd; San Antonio, Texas
- Coordinates: 29°29′51″N 98°28′45″W
- Built: 1926
- Architect: Dionicio Rodriguez
- NRHP reference No.: 05000862
- Added to NRHP: August 9, 2005

The Fountain at Alamo Cement Company is a Faux Bois sculpture by artist Dionicio Rodriguez. The sculpture is a concrete pond covered by a concrete palapa style roof . The sculpture was posted to the National Register of Historic Places on August 9, 2005.
