= Miraflores Park =

Sculpture garden in San Antonio, Texas

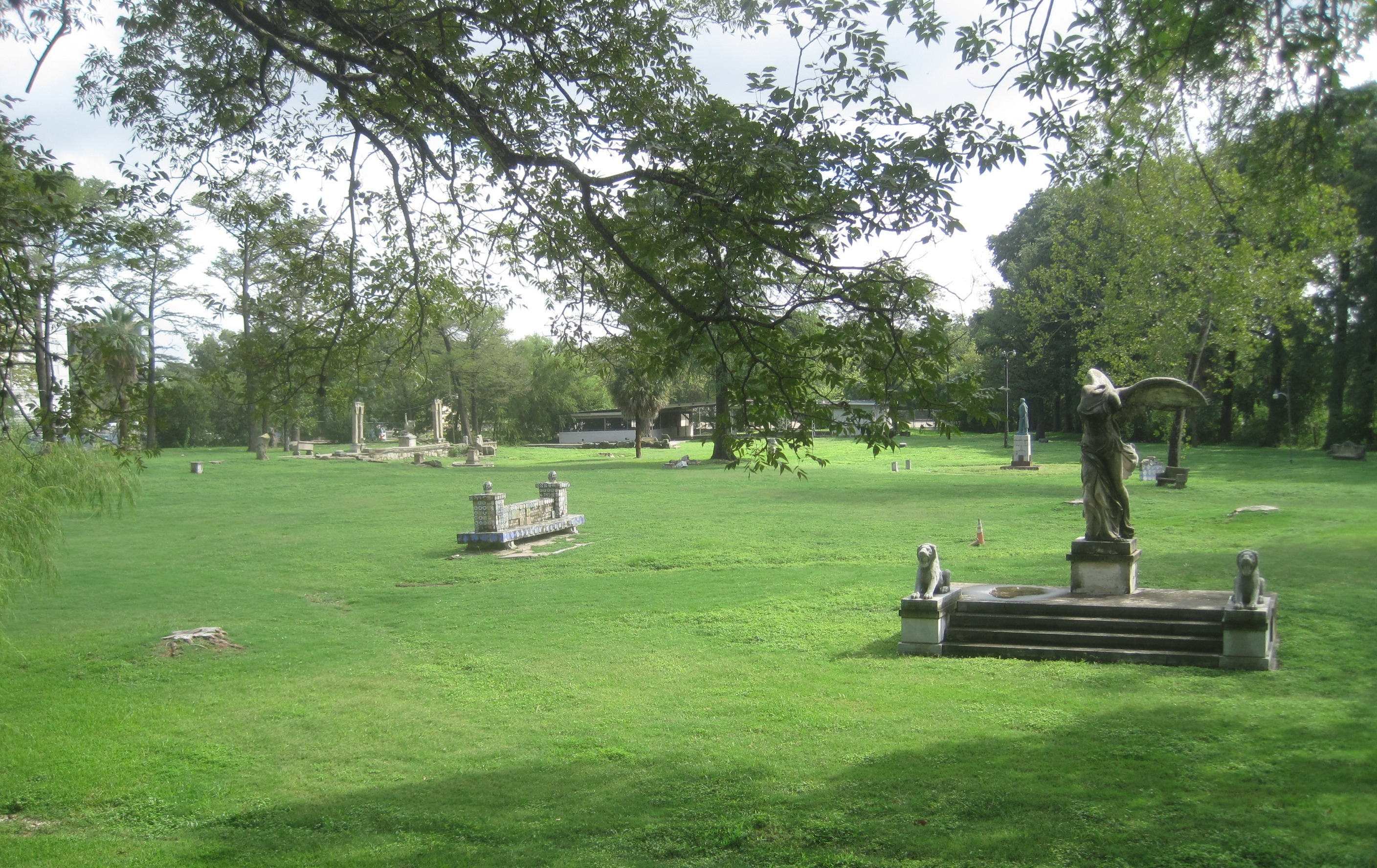
- Miraflores Park in 2012
- Interactive map of Miraflores Park
- Location: 800 Hildebrand; San Antonio, Texas
- Coordinates: 29°27′54″N 98°28′03″W
- Area: 4.5 acres (1.8 ha)
- Created: c. 1921
- Miraflores Alumni Park
- U.S. National Register of Historic Places
- U.S. Historic district
- Architect: Dionicio Rodriguez
- Architectural style: Faux bois sculpture
- MPS: Sculpture by Dionicio Rodriguez in Texas MPS
- NRHP reference No.: 04001176
- Added to NRHP: June 14, 2006

Miraflores Park, originally called just Miraflores and sometimes called Miraflores Alumni Park, is a sculpture garden in San Antonio, Texas. Originally established about 1921 as a private garden for Aureliano Urrutia, it features several works by Mexican-American artist Dionicio Rodriguez. It was added to the National Register of Historic Places on June 14, 2006.

== Layout and sculptures ==
Miraflores is located about 3 miles (4.8 km) northeast of downtown San Antonio, near the corner of East Hildebrand Avenue and Broadway. The San Antonio Zoo is immediately across from the San Antonio River on its west side. Today, only about 4.6 acres (1.9 ha) of the original 15 acres (6.1 ha) have been preserved. The park is currently undergoing major restoration works that aim to uncover the old pathways, restore the fountain, replant greenery, and add a new entrance into Brackenridge Park.

Although many of Rodriguez's works have not survived or have moved, several remain in the garden. These include the faux bois entry gate; a covered bench; two other faux bois sculptures; and a grotto. Other features of the garden include a life-size statue of Urrutia himself, which used to sit in the center of the fountain; and a replica of Winged Victory of Samothrace.

== History ==
Limited information is available about the prehistory of the site. An archaeological dig performed in 2009 near the San Antonio River uncovered artifacts dated to the Archaic period, between 3700 B.C. and 300 A.D.

Aureliano Urrutia immigrated to San Antonio from Mexico during the Mexican Revolution and had a long, successful career as a doctor. In 1921, Urrutia purchased the 15 acres (6.1 ha) of land that would become Miraflores. Urrutia was inspired by his birthplace of Xochimilco in Mexico City, which is known for its gardens and canals.

In 1923, he added a small 1-story guesthouse, called Quinta Maria, on the northwestern side of the park, next to Hildebrand Avenue. Urrutia commissioned Dioncio Rodriguez, who had newly arrived in San Antonio, to furnish the garden with sculptures. These works were some of Rodriguez's first in the United States. The garden was used as both a private retreat for the Urrutia family and for a place for them to entertain guests and host events. A fountain, which was later dismantled, was used by Urrutia as a swimming pool every morning.

In 1962, the United Services Automobile Association (USAA) purchased Miraflores. The eastern half of the park was demolished, and overtop, USAA built an office complex and parking lot for their headquarters. The Southwestern Bell Telephone Company purchased the site in 1974 and restored Quinta Maria in 1981. The original tile entry gate, also constructed by Rodriguez, was moved to the San Antonio Museum of Art in 1998. In 2001, Miraflores again changed hands to the University of the Incarnate Word, which is located across the street from the park. In 2006, the City of San Antonio obtained the park from the university, and since 2007 has been restoring the park. The Texas Historical Commission surveyed the site right after the purchase and made an inventory of all sculptures and features.
