= Buckeye Park Gate =

Sculpture in San Antonio, Texas

Coordinates: 29°28′45.2″N 98°31′17.6″W

- U.S. National Register of Historic Places
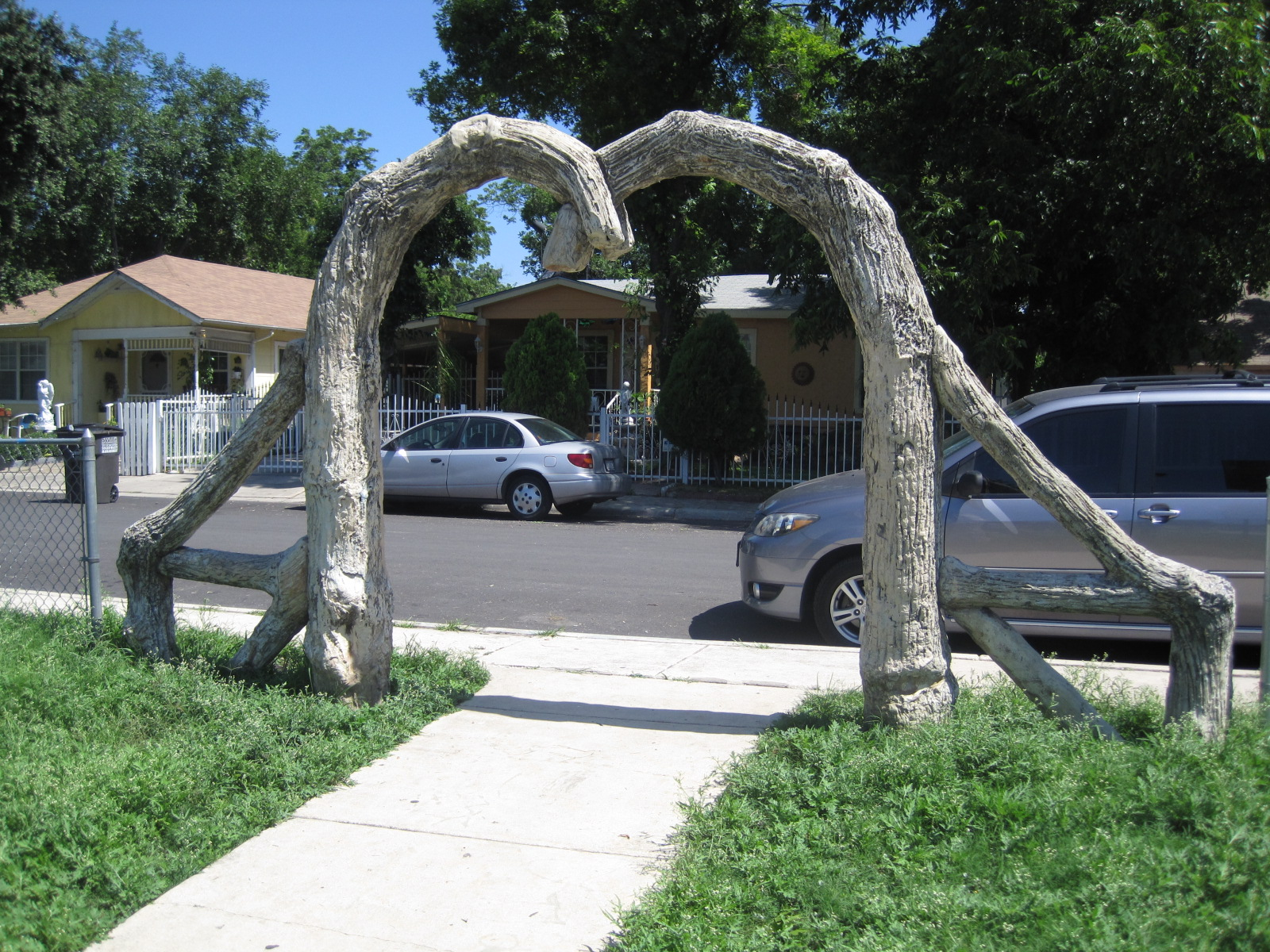
- The gate in 2010
- Interactive map of Buckeye Park Gate
- Location: San Antonio, Texas, United States
- Built: 1926
- Architect: Dionicio Rodriguez
- Architectural style: Faux bois
- NRHP reference No.: 04001169
- Added to NRHP: October 22, 2004

The Buckeye Park Gate is a gate and sculpture in San Antonio, Texas, United States. The structure is listed on the National Register of Historic Places.

== See also ==
- National Register of Historic Places listings in Bexar County, Texas
