= James Harrell (actor) =

American actor (1918–2000)

James N. Harrell
- Born: James Nelson Harrell; September 3, 1918; Waco, Texas, U.S.
- Died: February 1, 2000 (aged 81); San Marcos, Texas, U.S.
- Occupation: Actor

James Nelson Harrell (September 3, 1918 – February 1, 2000), also known as James N. Harrell, was an American actor.

== Early years ==
He was born in Waco, Texas, to Margaret Teny and Jefferson Whitfield Harrell, Chair of the Baylor University Mathematics Department, graduated from Waco High School and Baylor University. He held a master's degree in Drama from Trinity University. He studied acting at the original Baylor Theater with Paul Baker in the 1930s and in 1940 was invited to join Michael Chekhov's Acting Studio in Ridgefield, Connecticut.

== Career ==
He toured the East Coast with that company and was playing Twelfth Night when the attack on Pearl Harbor brought the United States into World War II, and most plays closed. Harrell served in the United States Army for four years in a tank company, in Headquarters Eighth Service Command, in Special Services, and in Occupied Japan. James Harrell, also known as "little Jimmy Harrell from Waco, Texas", appeared in over 75 film productions; feature films and television. He taught acting at the Dallas Theater Center and had leading roles in numerous productions, including 'Anse Bundren' in Journey to Jefferson, which toured Paris, Belgium and Germany.

He also taught stage and film acting at Southwest Texas State University for 24 years, retiring in 1994 as an associate professor. He had roles in such films as JFK, Varsity Blues, Michael, Hope Floats, Leap of Faith, Paper Moon, The Texas Chainsaw Massacre 2, Flesh and Bone, The Dollmaker, and Noon Wine. He worked often with Sam Shepard, Barry Corbin, Tommy Lee Jones, Jeff Bridges, Gary Busey, Roberts Blossom, Wilford Brimley, James Gammon and Harlan Jordan. He died in 2000 from a heart attack.

== Partial filmography ==
- 1970 A Bullet for Pretty Boy as Mr. Sam Floyd
- 1972 Encounter with the Unknown as Brother Taylor
- 1973 Paper Moon as The Minister
- 1974 The Sugarland Express as Mark Fenno
- 1974 Don't Hang Up as Dr. Crawther
- 1975 The Great Waldo Pepper as Farmer
- 1975 Race with the Devil as Gun Shop Owner
- 1975 Mackintosh and T.J. as Doolen
- 1976 A Small Town in Texas as Old Codger
- 1977 Outlaw Blues as Cop Chauffeur
- 1977 Rolling Thunder as Grandpa
- 1978 The Whole Shootin' Match as Rhonda Lynn's Father
- 1980 Urban Cowboy as Minister At Gravesite
- 1980 Resurrection as "Doc" Lurkin
- 1981 Raggedy Man as Ticket Taker
- 1984 Country as Jim, Bank Officer
- 1984 The Dollmaker as Old John Ballew
- 1986 The Texas Chainsaw Massacre 2 as Cut-Rite Manager
- 1987 Nadine as Deacon
- 1989 Riverbend as McBride
- 1989 Lost Angels as Shelby
- 1990 The Hot Spot as Elderly Man
- 1990 Texasville as Odessa Oil Man
- 1991 JFK as Sam Holland
- 1992 Leap of Faith as Ramsey
- 1993 Flesh and Bone as Woody
- 1996 Carried Away as Pastor
- 1996 A Family Thing as Earl Pilcher Sr.
- 1996 Michael as Old Geezer #1
- 1998 Hope Floats as Harry Calvert
- 1999 Varsity Blues as Murray
- 1999 A Slipping-Down Life as Doctor (final film role)
