= Memorial Park Cemetery (Memphis, Tennessee) =

Historic cemetery in Tennessee, United States

- Sculptures of Dionicio Rodriguez at Memorial Park Cemetery
- U.S. National Register of Historic Places
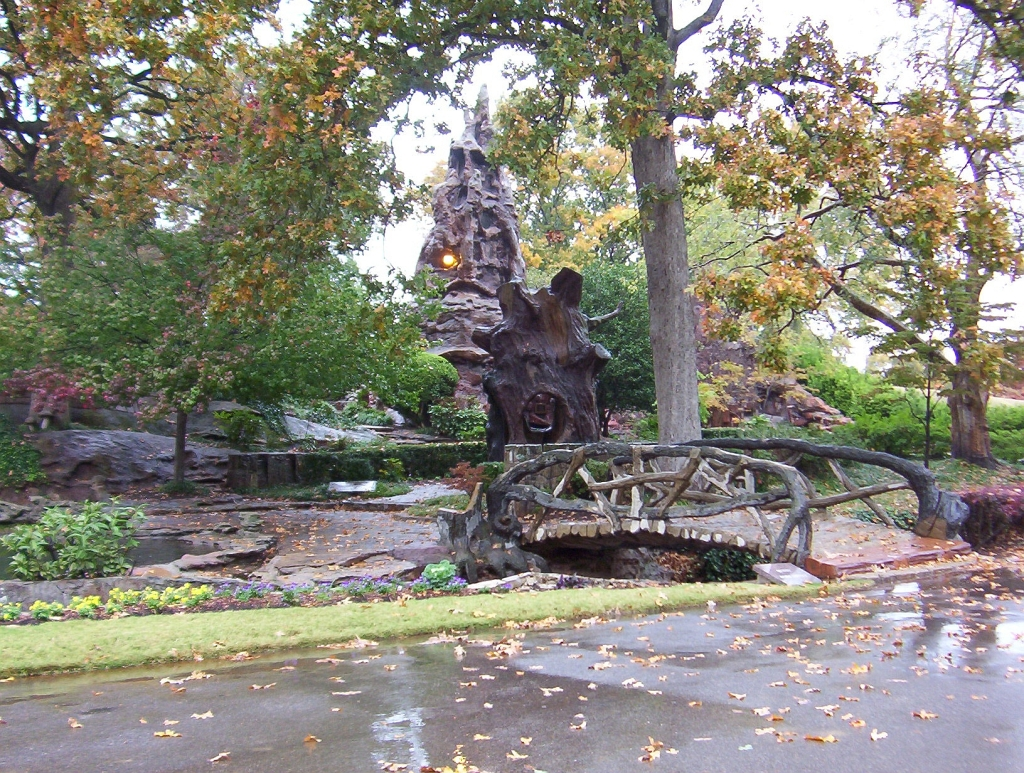
- Entrance to the Crystal Shrine Grotto

- Location within Tennessee Location within the United States
- Location: Memphis, Tennessee
- Coordinates: 35°6′30.48″N 89°52′25.05″W
- Architect: Rodriguez, Dionicio
- Architectural style: Concrete construction, imitating wood and natural rock. Artificial rock formations with caves.
- NRHP reference No.: 90001867
- Added to NRHP: January 31, 1991

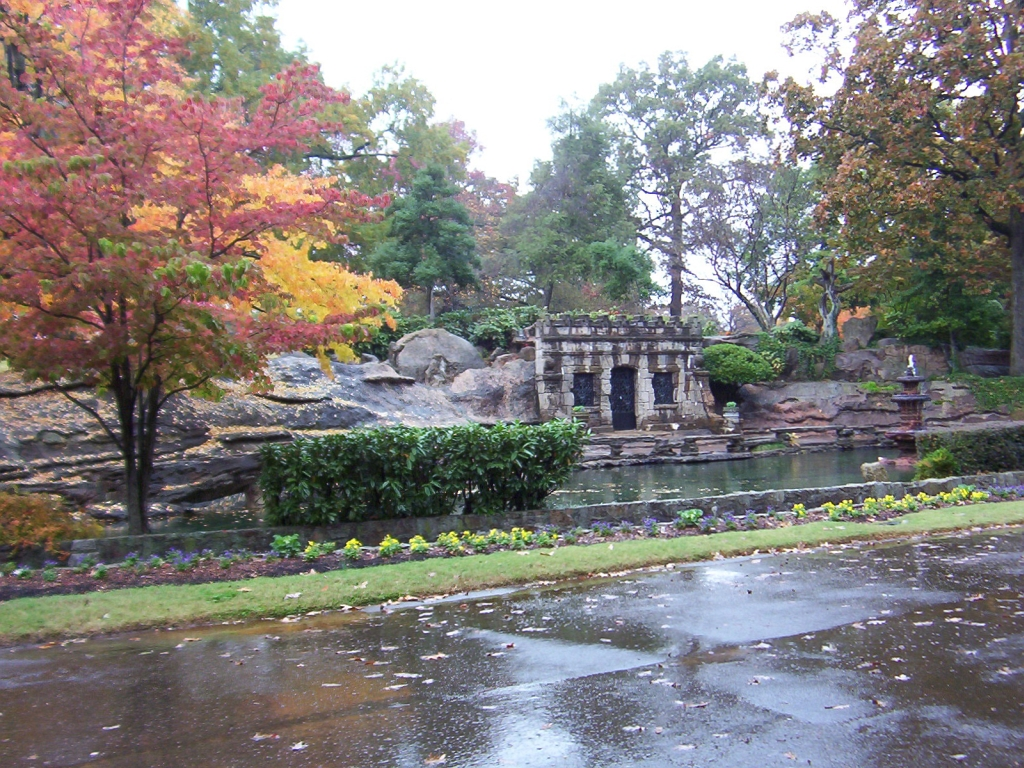
Pond and fountain next to the Crystal Shrine Grotto

Memorial Park Cemetery was founded in 1924 by E. Clovis Hinds on initial 54 acres (.22 km^{2}). It is located at 5668 Poplar Avenue in Memphis, Tennessee.

Different species of trees of different ages, as well as bushes, can be found throughout the cemetery, enhancing the atmosphere of a park-like setting.

The cemetery is noted for its Crystal Shrine Grotto, a hand-built cave depicting Biblical scenes built by artist Dionicio Rodriguez.

The cemetery is owned by the private death care industry company, NorthStar Memorial Group, based in Houston.

== Crystal Shrine Grotto ==
In 1935 Mexican artist Dionicio Rodriguez was hired to beautify the park with sculptures. Annie Laurie's Wishing Chairchairman, Broken Tree Bench, Abrahams Oak, Pool of Hebron and Cave of Machpelah are some of the most important sculptures that can be found in different locations throughout the cemetery.

In 1938 construction of the Crystal Shrine Grotto began. The grotto is a 60 ft (18.3 m) deep, hand-built cave in a hillside near the center of the cemetery, filled with 5 tons (4.5 t) of quartz crystal, hence the name Crystal Shrine Grotto. The grotto was completed after Rodriguez' death in 1955. The shrines in the grotto illustrate the stages of "Christ's Journey on the Earth from Birth to Resurrection".

Since 1991, the Crystal Shrine Grotto has been listed on the National Register of Historic Places for Tennessee.

== Notable burials ==
- James Pinckney Alley, early cartoonist
- Bobby Bland, American blues singer
- Don Briscoe, actor
- Laura Bullion, female Old West outlaw
- Ronnie Caldwell, musician with the Bar-Kays
- Jimmy Griffin, musician
- Isaac Hayes, singer and actor
- Mark James, singer, songwriter, musician
- Bill Justis, musician, composer, arranger
- Shawn Lane, composer, guitarist, pianist, musician
- Charlie Lea, baseball player
- Gilbert Earl Patterson, Presiding Bishop of the Church of God in Christ
- Sam Phillips, record producer
- Jay Reatard, musician
- Charlie Rich, singer
- Bob Welch, musician, former Fleetwood Mac member
- Red West, actor, songwriter
- George Klein (DJ), DJ and television host
- John (Long Tom) Thomas Winsett, MLB player

== See also ==
- List of cemeteries in the United States
