= The Day It Came to Earth =

- Release date: 1977
- Country: United States
- Language: English

The Day It Came To Earth is a 1977 film produced by Rainbow Production, directed by Harry Thomason and written by Paul Fisk (as Paul J. Fisk). The film stars Wink Roberts, Roger Manning, Delight De Bruine, and Rita Wilson and guest stars George Gobel. The film was distributed theatrically by Howco International Pictures and was released in November 1977. The film was filmed in Little Rock, Arkansas.

The storyline, similar to The Blob, concerns a group of teens who witness an alien, which arrives inside a meteorite, and are unable to get authority figures to believe them. The film enjoyed modest success at drive-ins, was afterwards released theatrical and later became available on VHS/DVD. It was featured via syndicated television on Elvira's Movie Macabre in 1982 and Svengoolie in 2005.

== Plot ==
An alien comes to Earth in a falling meteor and strikes a pond where local mobsters have stashed the body of their latest victim. The meteor reanimates the victim and, when the local college kids come to the swimming hole for a swim, excitement ensues.

== Cast ==
- Wink Roberts as Eddie Newton
- Roger Manning as Ronnie McGuire
- Robert Ginnaven as Lt. Kelly
- Delight De Bruine as Sally Baxter
- Rita Wilson as Debbie
- George Gobel as Prof. Bartholomew
- Ed Love as The Creature/Lou Jacoby
- Lyle Armstrong as Sgt. Larry Pinkerton
- Bill Elfstrom as Mayor Taylor
- Bill Eubanks as Mayor's Aide

== Production ==
The film was filmed in and around Little Rock (Pulaski County). It has a running time of eighty-eight minutes and received a rating of PG (for mild violence). The film featured a number of local Arkansas actors, such as Little Rock advertising executive Robert Ginnaven (Bob) in addition to comedian George Gobel and actress Rita Wilson,..

== Reception ==
Upon its release, the film enjoyed a modest success at drive-in theaters. It was distributed in its theatrical release by Howco International Pictures and later became available on VHS/DVD. It was featured via syndicated television on Elvira's Movie Macabre in 1982 and Svengoolie in 2005.
