= Old Central Fire Station (North Little Rock, Arkansas) =

- U.S. National Register of Historic Places
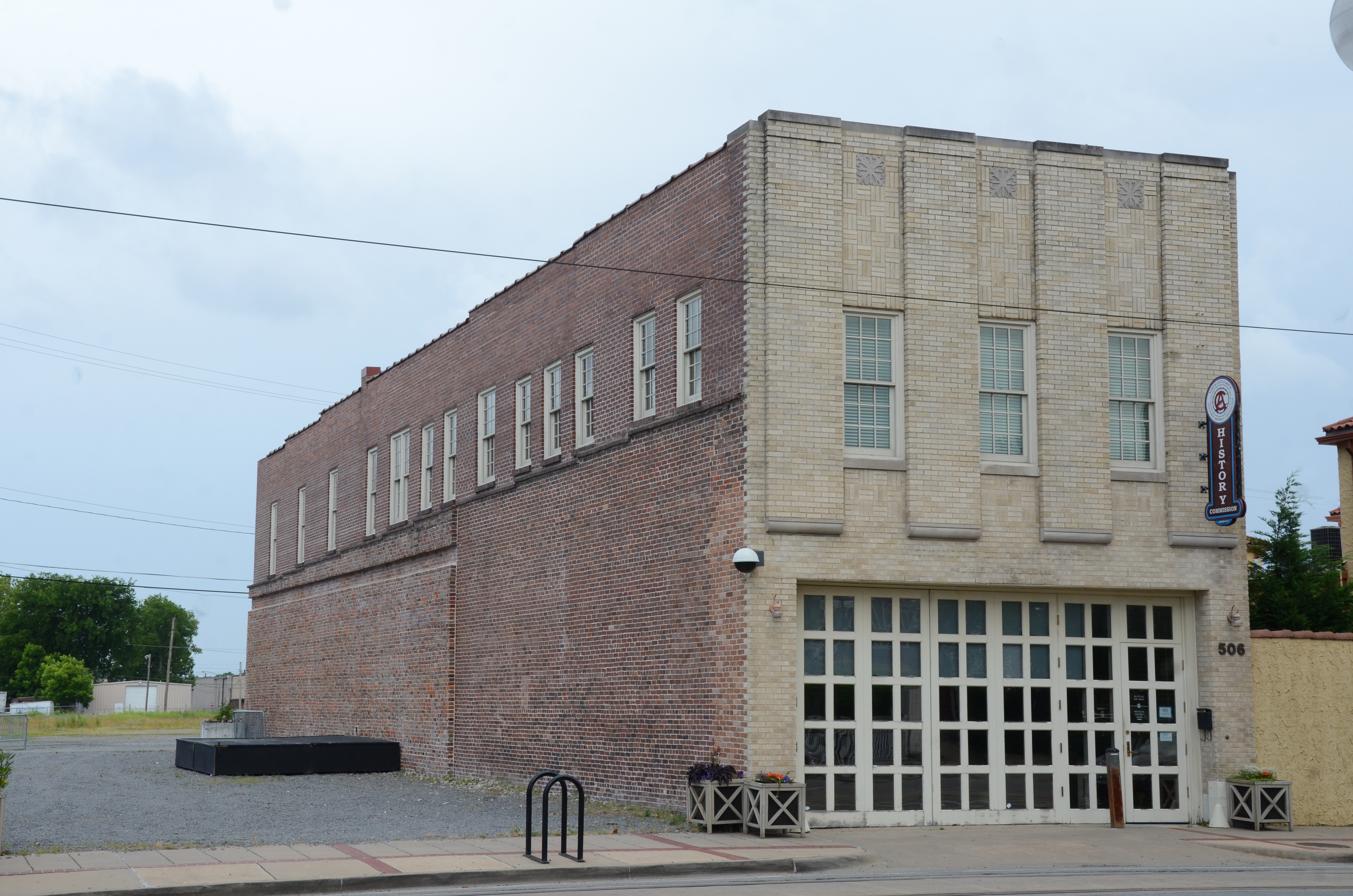

- Location within Arkansas Location within the United States
- Location: 506 Main St., North Little Rock, Arkansas
- Coordinates: 34°45′30″N 92°16′2″W
- Area: less than one acre
- Built: 1904
- NRHP reference No.: 77000274
- Added to NRHP: December 22, 1977

The Old Central Fire Station is a historic former fire station at 506 Main Street in North Little Rock, Arkansas. It is a two-story brick building, with a three-bay front facade dominated by a large equipment bay on the ground floor, now enclosed by glass doors. The building, whose construction date is not known, was acquired by the city in 1904, shortly after its incorporation, and initially housed city offices, the jail, and the fire station. In 1914 the town offices were moved to North Little Rock City Hall, and in 1923 the building's original two equipment bays were replaced by one. The horse stalls were also removed, as the new equipment was powered by gasoline engines. The building served as the city's main fire station until 1961.

The building was listed on the National Register of Historic Places in 1977.

== See also ==
- Park Hill Fire Station and Water Company Complex
- National Register of Historic Places listings in Pulaski County, Arkansas
