= Encounter with the Unknown =

- Theatrical release poster
- Directed by: Harry Thomason
- Written by: Jack Anderson; Joe Glass; Hillman Taylor; Harry Thomason
- Produced by: Joe Glass
- Starring: Rosie Holotik; Gary Brockette; Gene Ross; Annabelle Weenick; Robert Ginnaven; August Sehven; Kevin Bieberly
- Cinematography: James W. Roberson; Charles Thuston
- Edited by: Irwin Cadden; Brian H. Hooper
- Production company: Centronics International
- Distributed by: American National Enterprises; Rainbow Adventure Films
- Release date: October 29, 1972 (Hope, Arkansas)
- Running time: 90 minutes
- Country: United States
- Language: English

Encounter with the Unknown is a 1972 American anthology horror film directed by Harry Thomason in his directorial debut, and narrated by Rod Serling. It features three allegedly true stories involving the supernatural. The film was produced by Centronics International, an Arkansas-based studio founded by Thomason.

== Plot ==
The film presents three allegedly true stories of the supernatural. The first story, "The Heptagon," opens on a somber note at the funeral of college student Johnny Davis. His friends Dave, Frank and Randy are in attendance at the burial. It is revealed that they played a seemingly innocent phone prank on Johnny, telling him to go to a certain address where a date was waiting. The old woman who lived at the address accidentally shot Johnny to death. As the funeral service ends, Johnny's mother (who is the seventh daughter of a seventh son) recites a cryptic message to the three young men she blames for the death of her son: "One by land, two by sky...seven times around go the three of you, and may your reward be just and true." Later Frank relates this story to a priest, Father Duane, sitting next to him on a plane. He says that Dave was run over and killed seven days after the funeral. The priest tries to ease Frank's anxiety, assuring him that it's all a coincidence. However, after Father Duane exits the plane, it crashes upon takeoff. On the runway, Father Duane attempts to comfort a dying Frank, who tells him that exactly fourteen days have passed since Johnny's burial. The troubled priest—beginning to suspect that there might be more to this pattern of deaths than mere chance—speaks to his superior, who suggests telephoning the remaining young man at the state university. Father Duane tries to call Randy but instead reaches his roommate, who tells him that Randy has gone skydiving. It is now twenty-one days after Johnny's burial, the narrator reminds us, and according to Mrs. Davis's prophecy, two of the young men would perish by sky.

The second story, "The Darkness," is set in rural Missouri during the early twentieth century and involves the disappearance of a boy's dog in the vicinity of a mysterious hole in the ground. Concerned about the inexplicable moaning sounds coming from the hole, the boy's father agrees to be lowered in on a rope to see if he can recover the dog and to find out what's making the noise. Suddenly a terrifying scream emerges from the depths of the pit and the boy's father, now a raving lunatic, is hoisted back up. The mystery of the hole is never solved, and the story closes with the narrator's revelation that the father spent the rest of his life in an insane asylum.

The final segment, "The Girl on the Bridge," involves a strange disoriented girl and the Arkansas state senator who attempts to give her a ride home. Most of the story unfolds via the girl's flashbacks; as the senator and his wife arrive at the address the girl had given them, they find that she has mysteriously vanished from the back seat of the car. The girl's elderly father answers the door, telling the senator that his daughter died in a car accident many years earlier when she and her boyfriend were leaving town to get married. The father had disapproved of the relationship and told his daughter that he would rather see her dead.

According to the opening narration, the stories are based on research conducted by Dr. Jonathan Rankin, a parapsychologist, but this is evidently a fictional device as no record of the name "Jonathan Rankin" exists in the annals of parapsychological research. One of the segments, "The Girl on the Bridge," is simply a version of the Vanishing hitchhiker, a widespread and very popular urban legend. The stories themselves are narrated by Rod Serling, but the opening and closing portions of the film feature a second, uncredited narrator.

== Cast ==
- Rod Serling as Narrator (voice)
- Robert Ginnaven as Father Duane
- Gary Brockette as Frank Cameron
- John Leslie as Randy Powell
- Tom Haywood as Dave Terrell
- Fran Franklin as Mrs. Davis
- James N. Harrell as Brother Taylor
- John Cissne as Johnny Davis
- Mary Jane Wilson as Mrs. Wilson
- Lyle Armstrong as Second Priest
- Charles Rumph as Student
- Kevin Bieberly as Jess
- Annabelle Weenick as Mother
- Robert Holton as Joe
- Frank Schaefer as Barber
- Ken Carson as Doctor
- Bob Glenn as Constable
- David Haney as First Man
- Bill Thurman as Second Man
- Syl Schumann as Third Man
- Charlie Dell as Jonas
- Rosie Holotik as Susan
- Michael Harvey as Senator
- Judith Fields as Senator's Wife
- August Sehven as Paul
- Gene Ross as Susan's Father
- Beverly Dixon as Susan's Mother

== Production ==
Encounters with the Unknown marked the feature film debut of Harry Thomason, and the first film produced by Thomason's production company, Centronics International, which was based in Little Rock, Arkansas. The studio's second feature, So Sad About Gloria (1973), was filmed simultaneous to Encounter with the Unknown.

Numerous exterior locations were filmed in the Ozarks region of Arkansas. Some filming took place in the city of Little Rock, at the Capital Hotel and Mount Holly Cemetery.

== Release ==
Encounter with the Unknown was given a regional theatrical release in the United States, opening in Hope, Arkansas on October 29, 1972. It later opened in Indianapolis and Shreveport, Louisiana on November 30, 1972, and in Kansas City, Missouri on December 6, 1972.

== Soundtrack ==
- Robert Farrar (majority of score)
- Johnny Pearson - "Graveyard" and "Sleepy Shores"
- Becky Fain - "Rememberin' (How It Used To Be)"

== See also ==
- List of American films of 1973
