= Dionicio Rodriguez =

Mexican artist and architect (1891–1955)

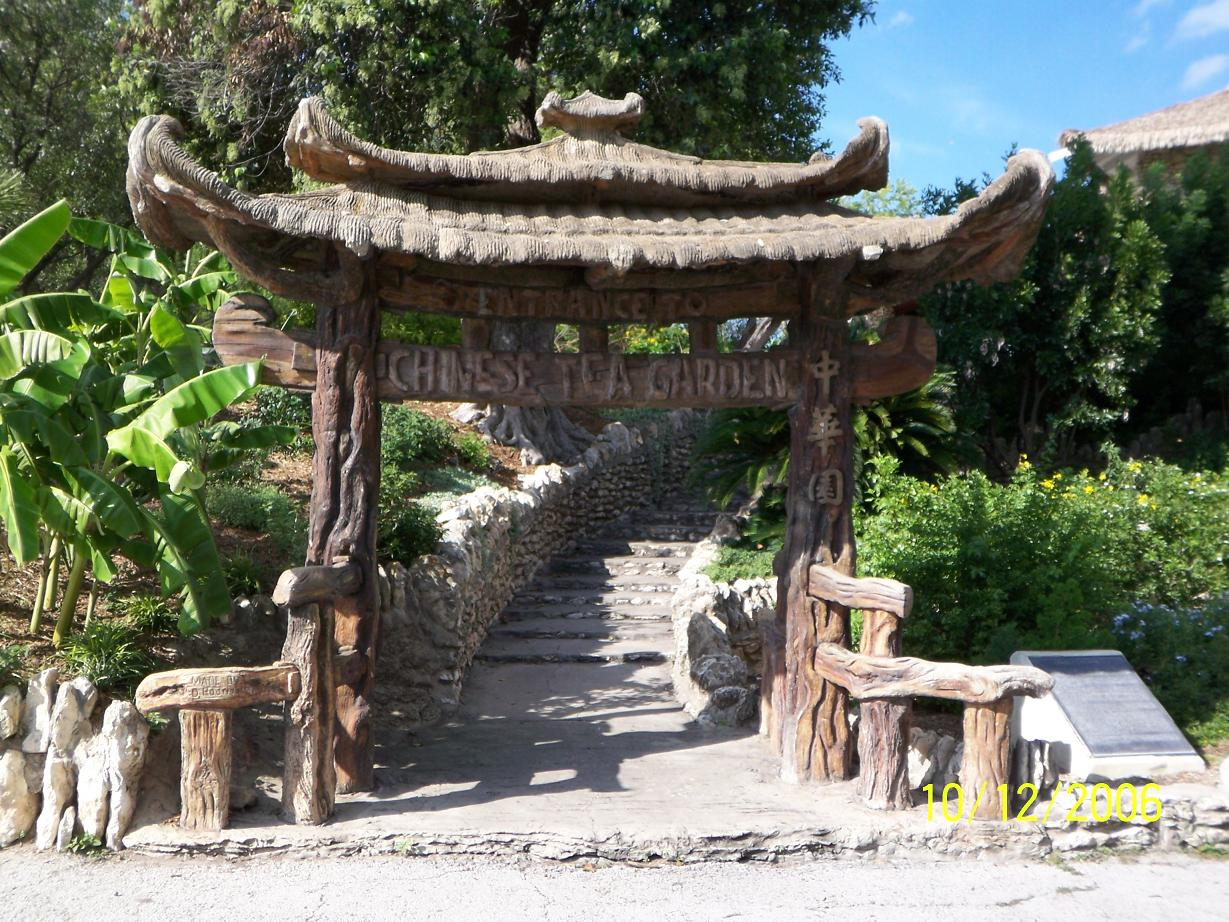
Entrance of the Japanese Tea Gardens in San Antonio, Texas

Dionicio Rodríguez (1891–1955) was a Mexican-born artist and architect whose work can be seen in Alabama, Arkansas, Illinois, Maryland, Michigan, New Mexico, Tennessee, and Texas, as well as Washington, D.C., and Mexico City.

His work is noted for its unique style of concrete construction that imitates wood, known as Faux Bois (French for false wood). Gates, benches and artificial rock formations were created by the artist to invite visitors to rest or explore the landscape.

Many of his major works of art are listed in the National Register of Historic Places.

== Biography ==
Rodríguez was born on April 11, 1891, in Toluca, State of Mexico, in Mexico to Catarino Rodríguez and Luz Alegria de Rodríguez. His family moved to Mexico City when he was young. When he was older, he worked with his father and brother as a bricklayer. Sometime later in Mexico City Rodríguez was hired by Luis Robles Gil, a contractor and civil engineer, and by J.W. Douglas who Rodríguez made cement objects for.

Rodríguez, with letters of recommendation from Douglas and Gil, left Mexico City in the early 1920s for Monterrey, Mexico. In Monterrey he met up with Máximo Cortés’ father who told Rodriquez that he should move to Laredo to work with his son. He moved on to Laredo, Texas shortly after and met up with Máximo Cortés, a fellow artisan, who was currently working on casting cement embellishments for a school. They worked with each other briefly before Rodríguez left for San Antonio. He arrived in San Antonio in 1924 and briefly worked at the Alamo cement company (1924-1925).

Rodríguez died at the Robert B. Green hospital in San Antonio on December 16, 1955, he was 64 when he passed and he was buried at the San Fernando Cemetery #2. He had no immediate survivors. Unknown if he ever married, his death certificate claims he’s a widower but there’s no proof she actually exists.

== Works ==
=== San Antonio ===
For the Japanese Tea Gardens in San Antonio, Rodríguez replicated a Japanese Torii gate at the entrance to the gardens. This piece was added to the National Register of Historic Places in 2005

With the rise of anti-Japanese sentiment of World War II in the 1940s, the gardens were renamed the Chinese Tea Gardens. In 1984, the city restored the original "Japanese Tea Garden" designation in a ceremony.

At least eight of his other sculptures in San Antonio: the Buckeye Park Gate; the Bridge in Brackenridge Park; the Fence at Alamo Cement Company; the Fountain at Alamo Cement Company; the Jacala Restaurant; locations in Miraflores Park; the Stations of the Cross and Grotto at the Shrine of St. Anthony de Padua; the Trolley Stop in Alamo Heights, were also added to the National Register of Historic Places in 2004 and 2005

=== Memorial Park Cemetery ===
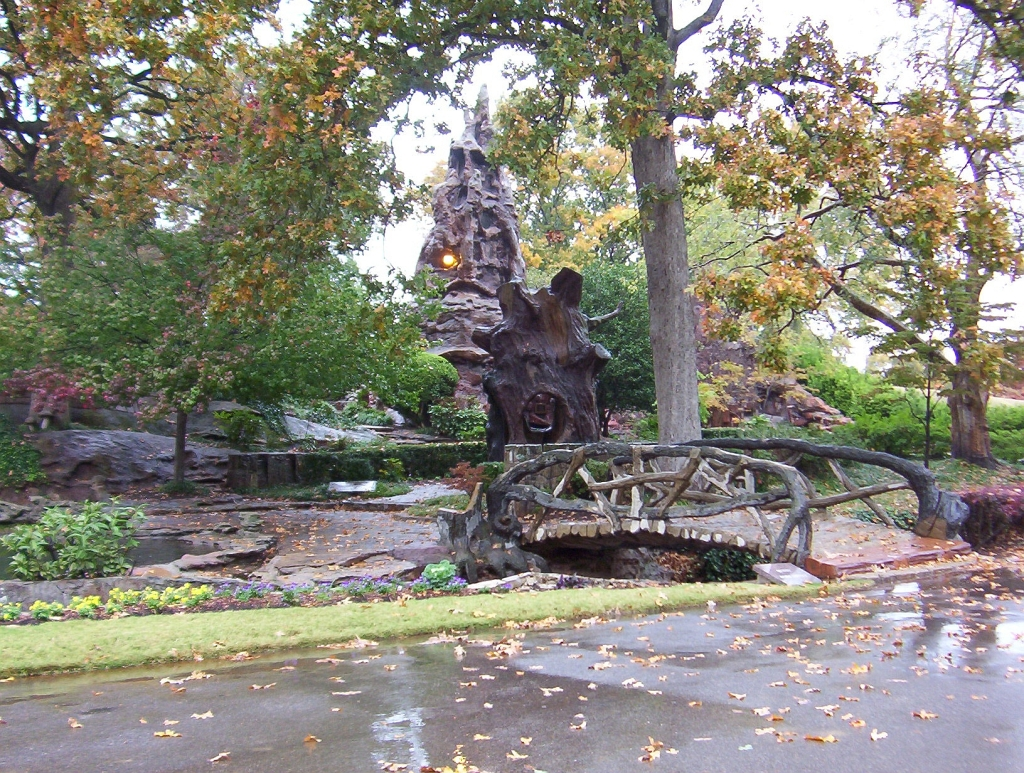
Crystal Shrine Grotto in the Memorial Park Cemetery, Memphis, Tennessee, 2007

In 1935 Rodríguez was hired to beautify the Memorial Park Cemetery, Memphis, Tennessee, with sculptures. Annie Laurie Wishing Chair, Broken Tree Bench, Abrahams Oak, Pool of Hebron and Cave of Machpelah are some of the most important sculptures that can be found throughout the cemetery.

=== Cedar Hill Cemetery ===
Working in Cedar Hill Cemetery just outside Washington, D.C., in suburban Suitland, Maryland, in 1936 and 1937, Rodríguez built numerous sculptural pieces, including a fallen tree bench, a tiled block bench, two bridges with branch railings and log decks, a tree shelter, and an Annie Laurie Wishing Chair.

=== Crystal Shrine Grotto ===
Construction of the Crystal Shrine Grotto began in 1938. The grotto is a 60-foot (18.3-meter) deep, hand-built cave in a hillside near the center of the cemetery, filled with five tons (4.5 metric tons) of quartz crystal, hence the name Crystal Shrine Grotto. The shrines in the grotto illustrate the stages of "Christ's Journey on the Earth from Birth to Resurrection". Rodríguez' sculptures and the Crystal Shrine Grotto in the Memorial Park Cemetery are listed in the National Register of Historic Places.

=== Woodlawn Garden of Memories ===
At least five of the sculptural pieces in the Woodlawn Garden of Memories in Houston are the work of Rodriguez circa 1940: the 25-foot (7.6-meter) tall cross and its surrounding four benches; a flower planter basket; a 60-foot (18.3-meter) long fallen tree bench; and an Annie Laurie Wishing Chair.

=== Other works ===
- Aviary at the Houston Zoo, 1513 N. McGregor Houston, TX, NRHP-listed
- Buckeye Park Gate, 1600 W. Wildwood San Antonio, TX, NRHP-listed
- Chinese Sunken Garden Gate, Brackenridge Park, 400 N. St. Mary's St. San Antonio, TX, NRHP-listed
- Couchwood, 601 Couchwood Rd., Shorewood Hills, AR, NRHP-listed
- Crestview Park, Crestview and Cherry Hill Drives, North Little Rock, AR, NRHP-listed
- Dionicio Rodriguez Bridge in Brackenridge Park, 400 N. St. Mary's St. San Antonio, TX, NRHP-listed
- Eddingston Court, 3300 Proctor St. Port Arthur, TX, NRHP-listed
- Elmwood Cemetery, 600 Martin Luther King Jr Dr, Birmingham, AL
- Fence at Alamo Cement Company, 7300 Jones Maltsberger Rd. San Antonio, TX, NRHP-listed
- Fountain at Alamo Cement Company, 7300 Jones Maltsberger Rd. San Antonio, TX, NRHP-listed
- Gate, Fence and Hollow Tree Shelter Designed by Dionicio Rodriguez, 320 Oak St. Clayton, NM, NRHP-listed
- Gazebo for Albert Steves, 105 FM 473, at east portion of property Comfort, TX, NRHP-listed
- Gazebo for James Richard Marmion, 1214 County Rd. Sweeny, TX, NRHP-listed
- Jacala Restaurant, 2702 N. St. Mary's St. San Antonio, TX, NRHP-listed
- Lakewood Park, Address Restricted North Little Rock, AR, NRHP-listed
- Little Switzerland, Address Restricted Shorewood Hills, AR, NRHP-listed
- Miraflores Park (seven works), 1184 E Hildebrand Ave. San Antonio, TX, NRHP-listed
- Palapa Table for James Richard Marmion, 1214 County Rd. Sweeny, TX, NRHP-listed
- T. R. Pugh Memorial Park, 3800 Lakeshore Drive, North Little Rock, AR, NRHP-listed
- Sculptures of Dionicio Rodriguez at Memorial Park Cemetery, 5668 Poplar Ave. Memphis, TN, NRHP-listed
- Stations of the Cross and Grotto at the Shrine of St. Anthony de Padua (grotto and 14 stations), 100 Peter Baque Rd. San Antonio, TX, NRHP-listed
- Trolley Stop in Alamo Heights, 4900 blk of Broadway Alamo Heights, TX, NRHP-listed
- Woodlawn Garden of Memories Cemetery, 1101 Antoine Houston, TX, NRHP-listed
