= Park Hill Fire Station and Water Company Complex =

- U.S. National Register of Historic Places
- U.S. Historic district – Contributing property
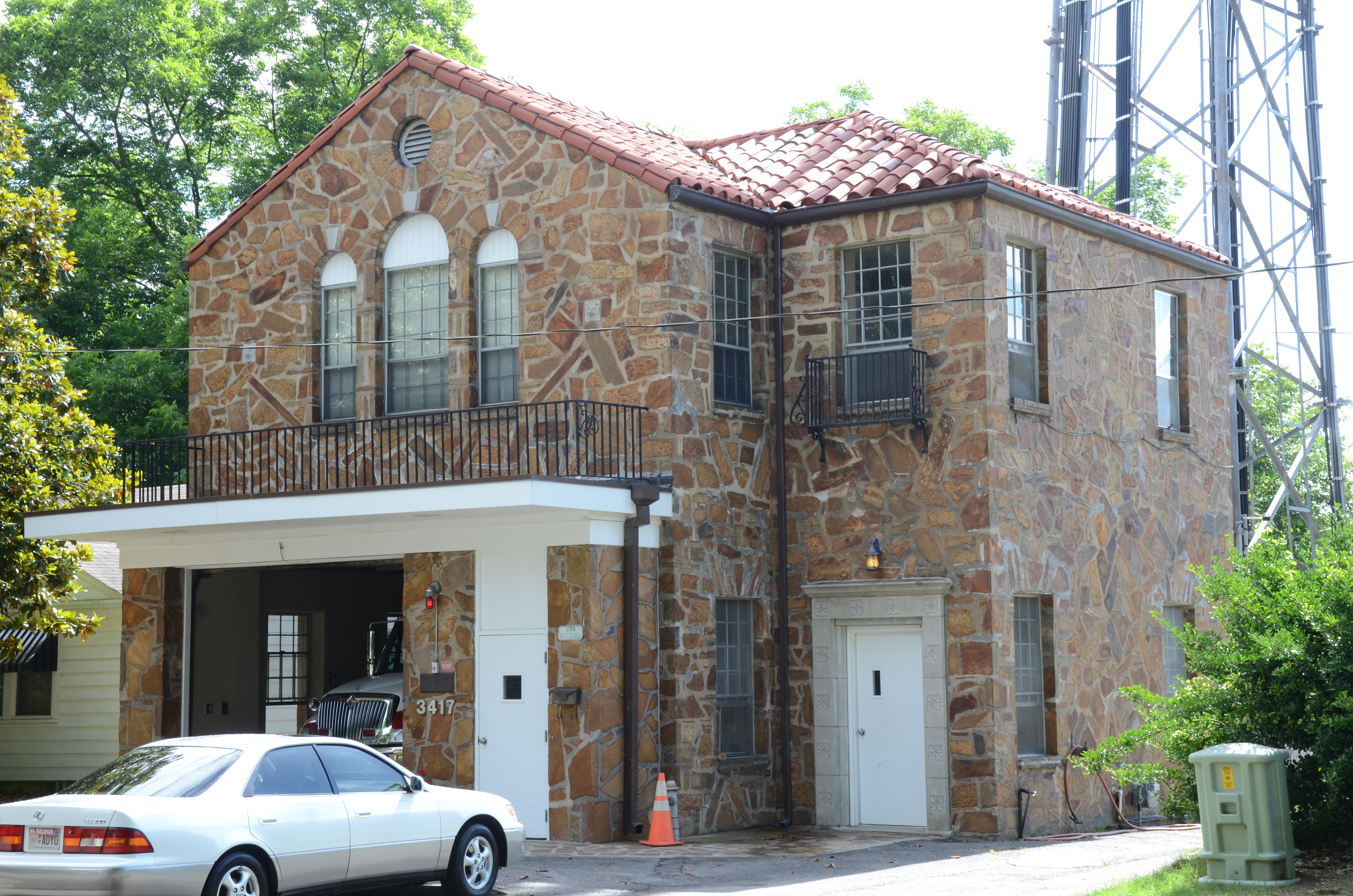

- Location within Arkansas Location within the United States
- Location: 3417-3421 Magnolia St., North Little Rock, Arkansas
- Coordinates: 34°47′13″N 92°15′52″W
- Area: 3 acres (1.2 ha)
- Built: 1938
- Built by: Works Progress Administration
- Architect: Brueggeman, Swaim and Allen;
- Architectural style: Mediterranean Revival
- Part of: Park Hill Historic District (ID00000935)
- NRHP reference No.: 93001248

Significant dates
- Added to NRHP: November 19, 1993
- Designated CP: August 16, 2000

The Park Hill Fire Station and Water Company Complex is a collection of historic public facilities at 3417-21 Magnolia Street in North Little Rock, Arkansas. The complex consists of a fire station, a water company office, two concrete reservoirs, and two stone pump houses, all built in 1938 with funding support from the Works Progress Administration. The fire station and water company office are distinguished architecturally by their fieldstone exteriors and Mediterranean style, including red tiled roofs. They were designed by the Little Rock firm of Brueggeman, Swaim and Allen.

The complex was listed on the National Register of Historic Places in 1993.

== See also ==
- Old Central Fire Station (North Little Rock, Arkansas)
- National Register of Historic Places listings in Pulaski County, Arkansas
