= Park Hill Historic District =

Historic district in Arkansas, United States

- U.S. National Register of Historic Places
- U.S. Historic district
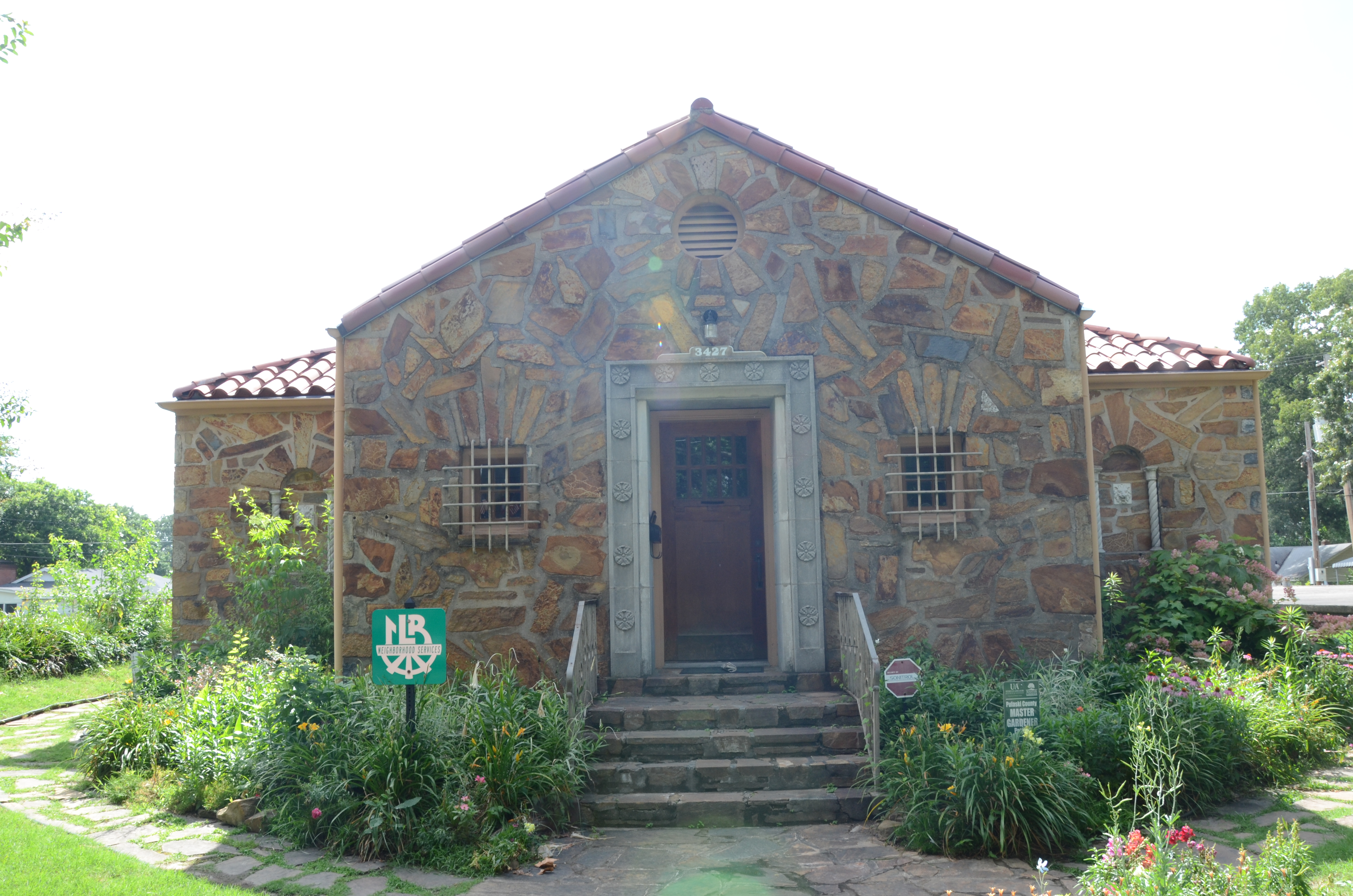

- Location within Arkansas Location within the United States
- Location: Roughly bounded by Plainview Circle, Crestview Boulevard, Ridge Street and H Avenue, Pulaski, Arkansas
- Coordinates: 34°47′9″N 92°15′40″W
- Area: 172 acres (70 ha)
- Built: 1922
- Architect: Frank Carmean, et al.
- Architectural style: Bungalow/American Craftsman, Mission Revival/Spanish Revival
- NRHP reference No.: 00000935
- Added to NRHP: August 16, 2000

The Park Hill Historic District encompasses the first suburban residential subdivision of the city of North Little Rock, Arkansas. It covers 172 acres (70 ha) in a geographically central part of the city, bisected by JFK Boulevard, and roughly bounded on the north by H Avenue, the west by Ridge Road, the east by Cedar Street and Plainview Circle, and the south by Crestview Drive. This area was developed beginning in 1922 by Justin Matthews, a major local developer, and greatly expanded the city's housing stock through the 1940s and 1950s. The vast majority of its architecture is residential, with commercial development limited to its major arterial roadways. The district includes Crestview Park and the Park Hill Fire Station and Water Company Complex.

The district was listed on the National Register of Historic Places in 2000.

== See also ==
- National Register of Historic Places listings in Pulaski County, Arkansas
