= Lakewood Park (North Little Rock, Arkansas) =

- U.S. National Register of Historic Places
- U.S. Historic district
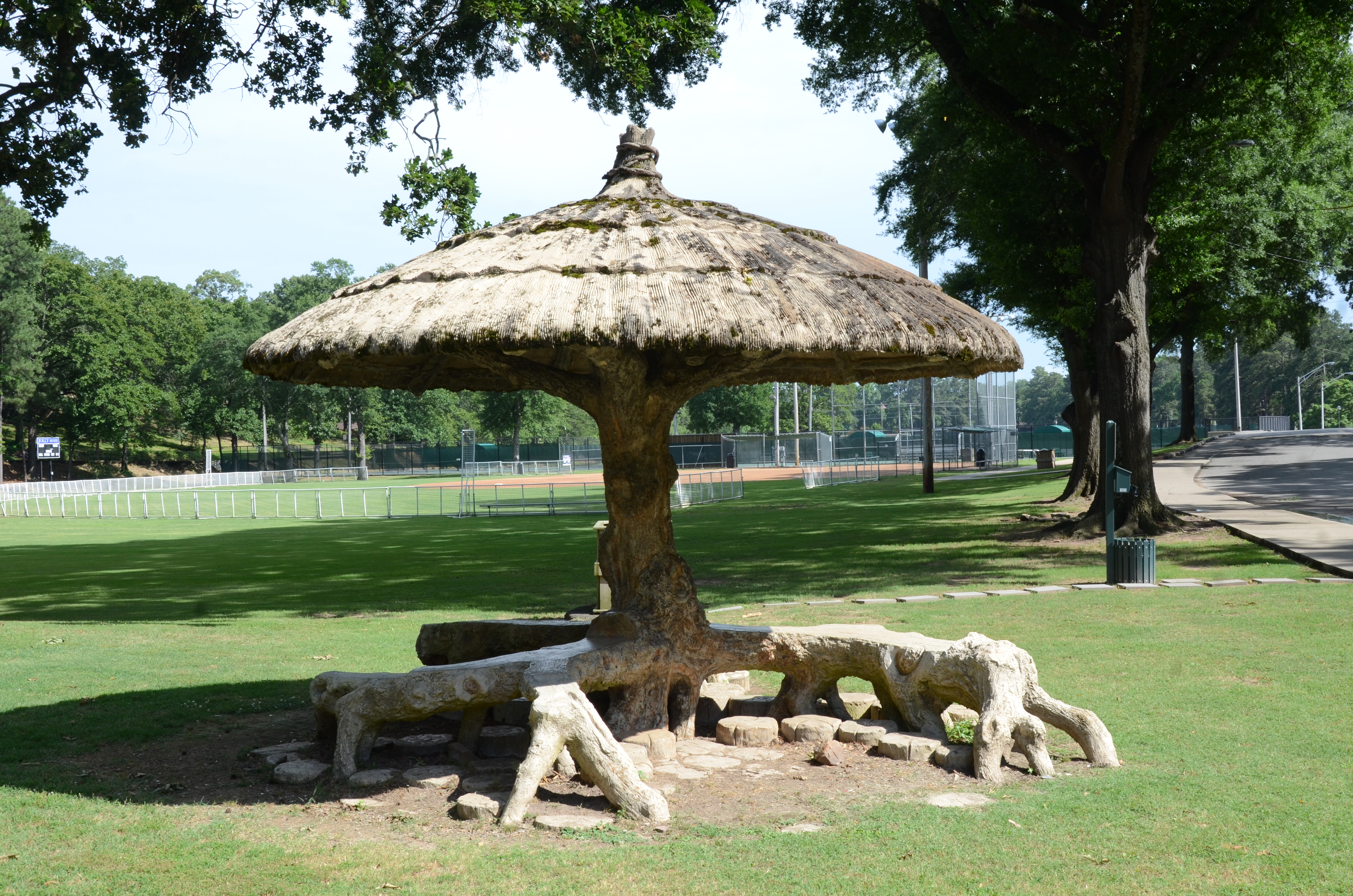
- One of the Rodriguez sculptures, with a baseball playing field in the background

- Location within Arkansas Location within the United States
- Location: North Little Rock, Arkansas
- Coordinates: 34°47′49″N 92°15′6.7″W
- Area: 0.4 acres (0.16 ha)
- Built: 1933
- Artist: Dionicio Rodriguez
- MPS: Arkansas Sculptures of Dionicio Rodriguez TR
- NRHP reference No.: 86003586
- Added to NRHP: December 4, 1986

Lakewood Park is a private park located at the northern end of Lake Number Three in North Little Rock, Arkansas. It is roughly bounded on the east by Edgemere Drive, the south by the lake, and the west by Lakeshore Drive, although a portion of the park lies west of Lakeshore Drive. Use of most of the park's athletic and recreational facilities are limited to members of the Lakewood Property Owners Association, which owns and manages the park. The park includes seven artworks by the Mexican artist Dionicio Rodriguez, which are listed on the National Register of Historic Places.

== See also ==
- National Register of Historic Places listings in Pulaski County, Arkansas
