= Robert Ginnaven =

American actor

- Born: Robert Addison Ginnaven, Jr. January 1, 1937; Memphis, Tennessee, U.S.
- Died: February 17, 2008 (aged 71); Little Rock, Arkansas, U.S.
- Other name: Bob Ginnaven
- Education: University of Memphis (BA)
- Spouses: Ila Verne Ginnaven; Ann Ginnaven; Jeanne Tyler Ginnaven
- Children: 3

Robert Addison Ginnaven Jr. (January 1, 1937 – February 17, 2008) was an American film and television actor.

== Early life and education ==
Ginnaven was born in Memphis, Tennessee, in 1937. He was the only child born to Pauline (née Boals), and Robert Addison Ginnaven, Sr. His mother worked for many years as a medical secretary in Downtown Memphis, and his father, who served in the United States Navy during World War II, worked for years as a deliveryman for Wonder Bread, also in Memphis.

Ginnaven graduated from Southside High School and earned a Bachelor of Arts degree in English from the University of Memphis. Ginnaven was initially introduced to the theatre by a classmate who suggested he try out for a college production.

== Career ==
After completing his degree, Ginnaven moved to New York City, where he studied under Lee Strasberg. where Ginnaven was employed by KATV as a weatherman and talk show host. Ginnaven was later employed in the advertising industry, where he worked for the rest of his life.

=== Acting career ===
Ginnaven appeared in minor or uncredited roles. Ginnaven was 37 when he made his film debut in Encounter with the Unknown, which was released in 1973. Ginnaven played Father Duane. In 1981, Ginnaven appeared on Dallas, appearing in only three episodes; Ginnaven was uncredited in the appearance. In 1992, Ginnaven appeared in his 18th and last movie called One False Move as Deputy Charlie. During the year, Robert had appeared in his second and last television show called Dangerous Curves in one episode as Matthew Carlson. According to some websites, it stated that Ginnaven was best known for his appearance in One False Move. Ginnaven also had a small but noticeable appearance in White Lightning, where he plays a friend of Ned Beatty's character Sheriff J.C. Connors.

== Personal life ==
Ginnaven moved back to Memphis in 1958, where he met his first wife, Ila Verne (née Crews) at an open-call audition being held by the local PBS station. Married December 21, 1958, Bob and Ila had their first child, Robert Addison Ginnaven III, on October 29, 1959. Not long after their son was born, Bob and Ila moved from Memphis to Little Rock, Arkansas. On May 15, 1961, their second child and only daughter, Elizabeth Leigh Ginnaven, was born. Their last child, Christopher Crews Ginnaven, was born on August 7, 1962. Ila died of complications from lung cancer on August 31, 1994. A few years later, Bob remarried Ann Vickers who was at the time the director of sales at KATV, the same TV station Ginnaven, Jr. had started at when he first moved to Little Rock. The marriage lasted a number of years, but ultimately ended in an amicable divorce. Not long after Ginnaven, Jr. was divorced, he began to date a friend by the name of Jeanne Crews. Ginnaven, Jr. and Jeanne Ginnaven (née Crews) were soon married, and remained married until he died on February 17, 2008.

Ginnaven married Jeanne Tyler Ginnaven; they lived in Little Rock, Arkansas.

== Filmography ==
=== Film ===
Year	Title	Role	Notes
1972	Encounter with the Unknown	Father Duane	
1973	So Sad About Gloria	Chris Kenner	
1973	White Lightning	Harvey	
1974	The Great Lester Boggs	T. T. Boggs	
1977	The Day It Came to Earth	Lt. Kelly	
1982	The Best Little Whorehouse in Texas	Reporter	
1982	Deadly Choice	Dr. Bob Reasoner	
1987	Three for the Road	Dr. Hastings	
1987	End of the Line	State Trooper	
1987	Pass the Ammo	Mean	
1988	Stay Tuned for Murder	Judge Barnevay	
1989	Steel Magnolias	Mayor Van Meter	
1992	One False Move	Charlie	

=== Television ===
Year	Title	Role	Notes
1977	The Trial of Lee Harvey Oswald		Television film
1981	Crisis at Central High	General Thomas Woods	Television film
1981–1987	Dallas	Police Officer	6 episodes
1983	Adam	Det. Vincent Corrao	Television film
1984	Time Bomb	Halifax	Television film
1985	Right to Kill?	Det. Marquez	Television film
1992	Dangerous Curves	Matthew Carlson	Episode: "Obsession"
