= Crestview Park =

- U.S. National Register of Historic Places
- U.S. Historic district – Contributing property
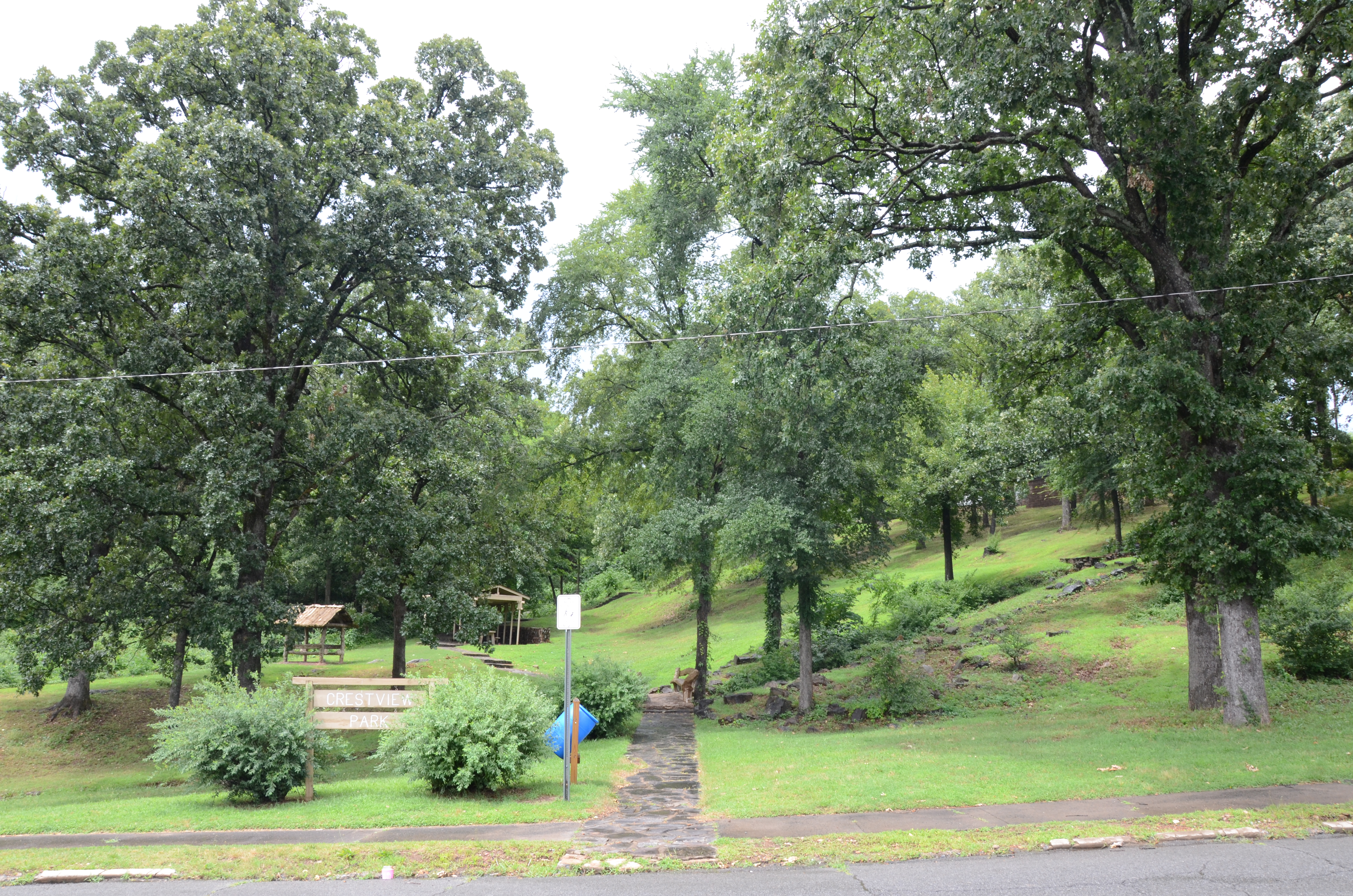

- Location within Arkansas Location within the United States
- Location: Crestview and Cherry Hill Drives, North Little Rock, Arkansas
- Coordinates: 34°46′57″N 92°15′51″W
- Area: less than one acre
- Built: 1933
- Artist: Dionicio Rodriguez
- Part of: Park Hill Historic District (ID00000935)
- MPS: Arkansas Sculptures of Dionicio Rodriguez TR
- NRHP reference No.: 86003583

Significant dates
- Added to NRHP: December 4, 1986
- Designated CP: August 16, 2000

Crestview Park is a small neighborhood park in North Little Rock, Arkansas. It is roughly bounded by Cherry Hill Drive, Crestview Drive, and the westbound onramp to Interstate 40 from Arkansas Highway 107. The park, set on a steeply sloping parcel, has no major amenities, and was established for passive recreational uses of the nearby population. The park is notable for the presence of two naturalistic sculptures by Dionicio Rodriguez that were installed c. 1933. One is a footbridge that appears to have been fashioned out of a fallen tree, and the other is rustic shelter, one of Rodriguez' more unusual works.

The artwork within the park was listed on the National Register of Historic Places in 1986.

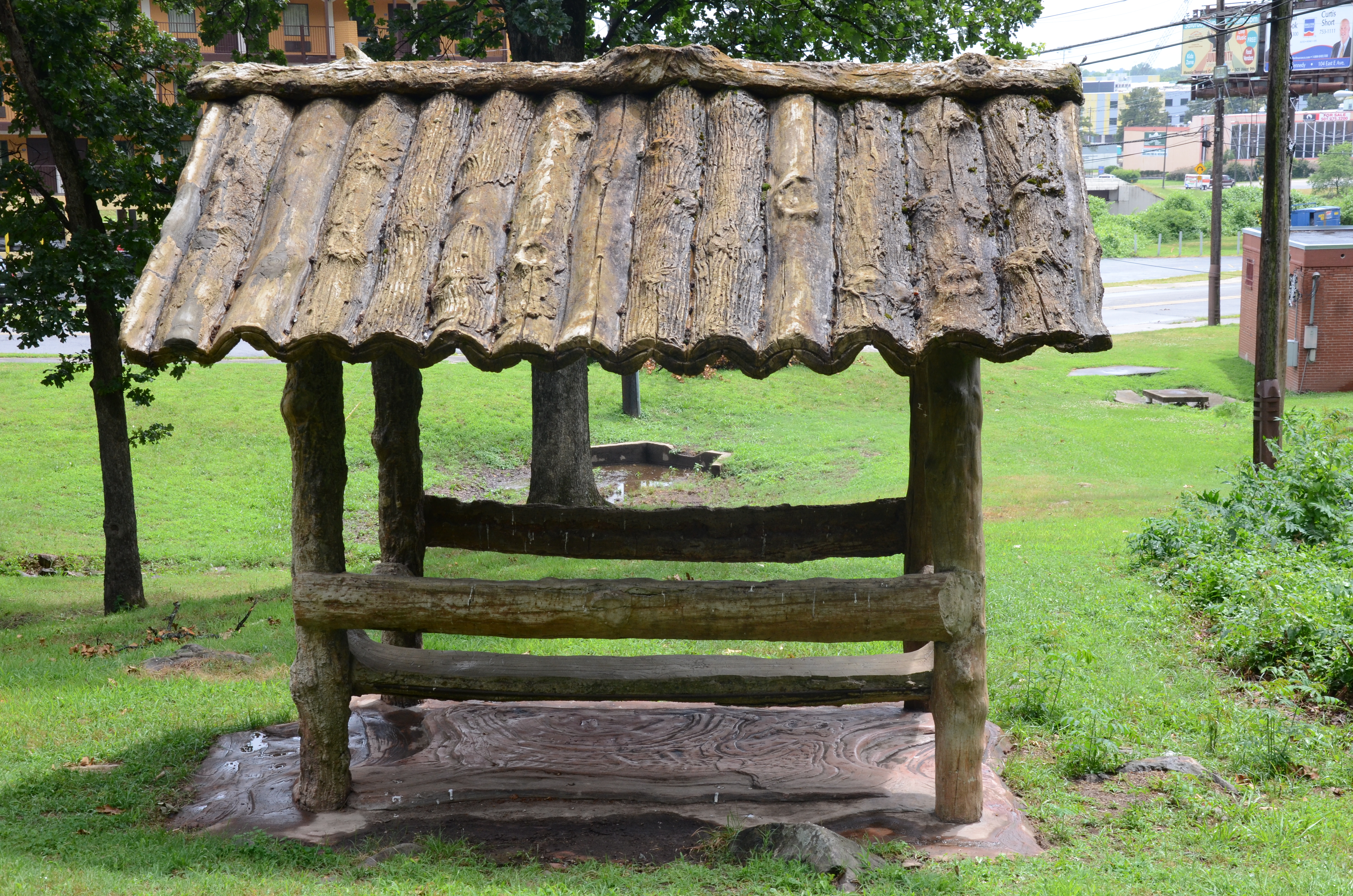
Concrete Shelter at Crestview Park

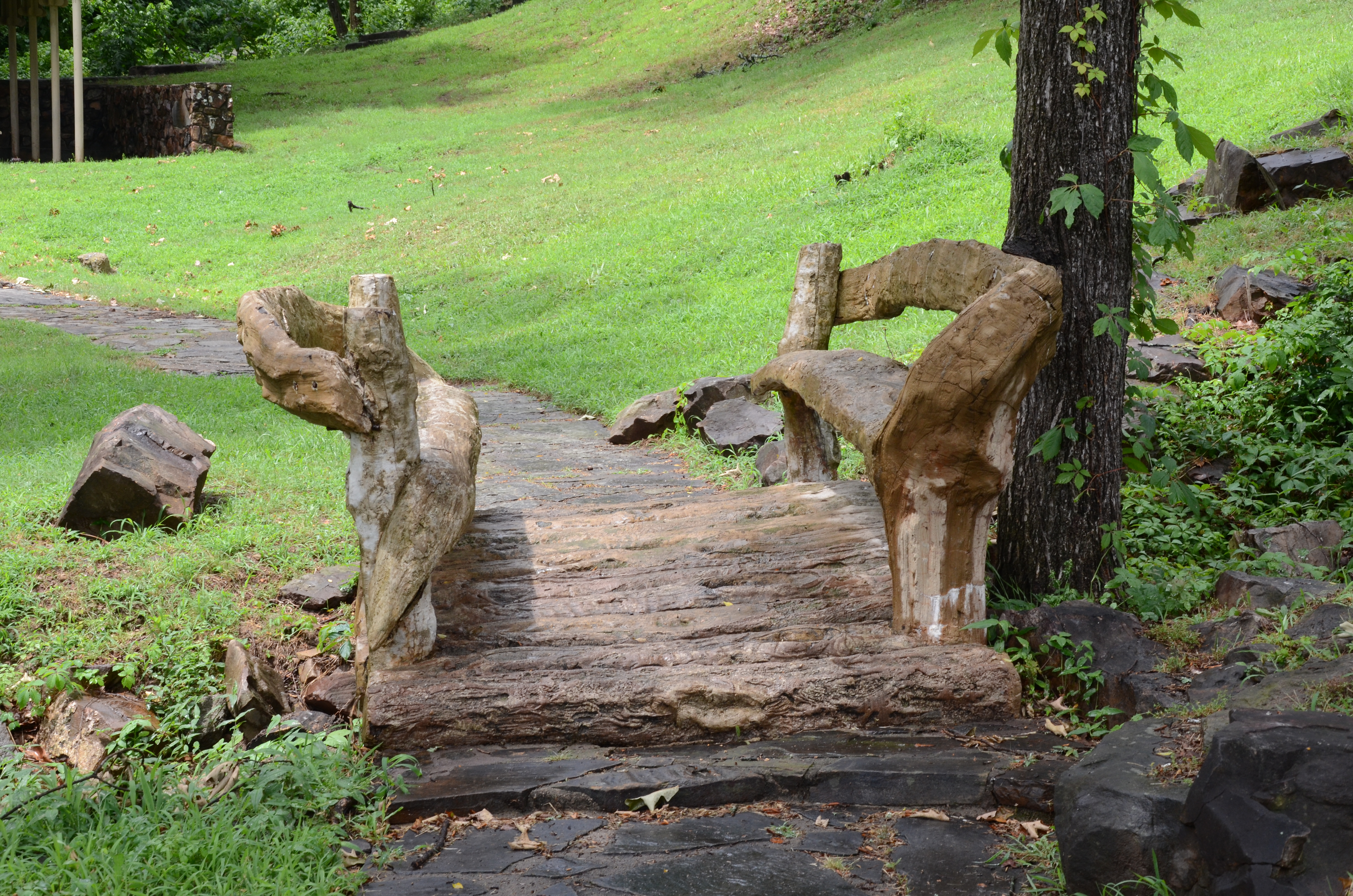
Concrete Bridge at Crestview Park

== See also ==
- National Register of Historic Places listings in Pulaski County, Arkansas
