= Faux bois =

Artistic imitation of wood

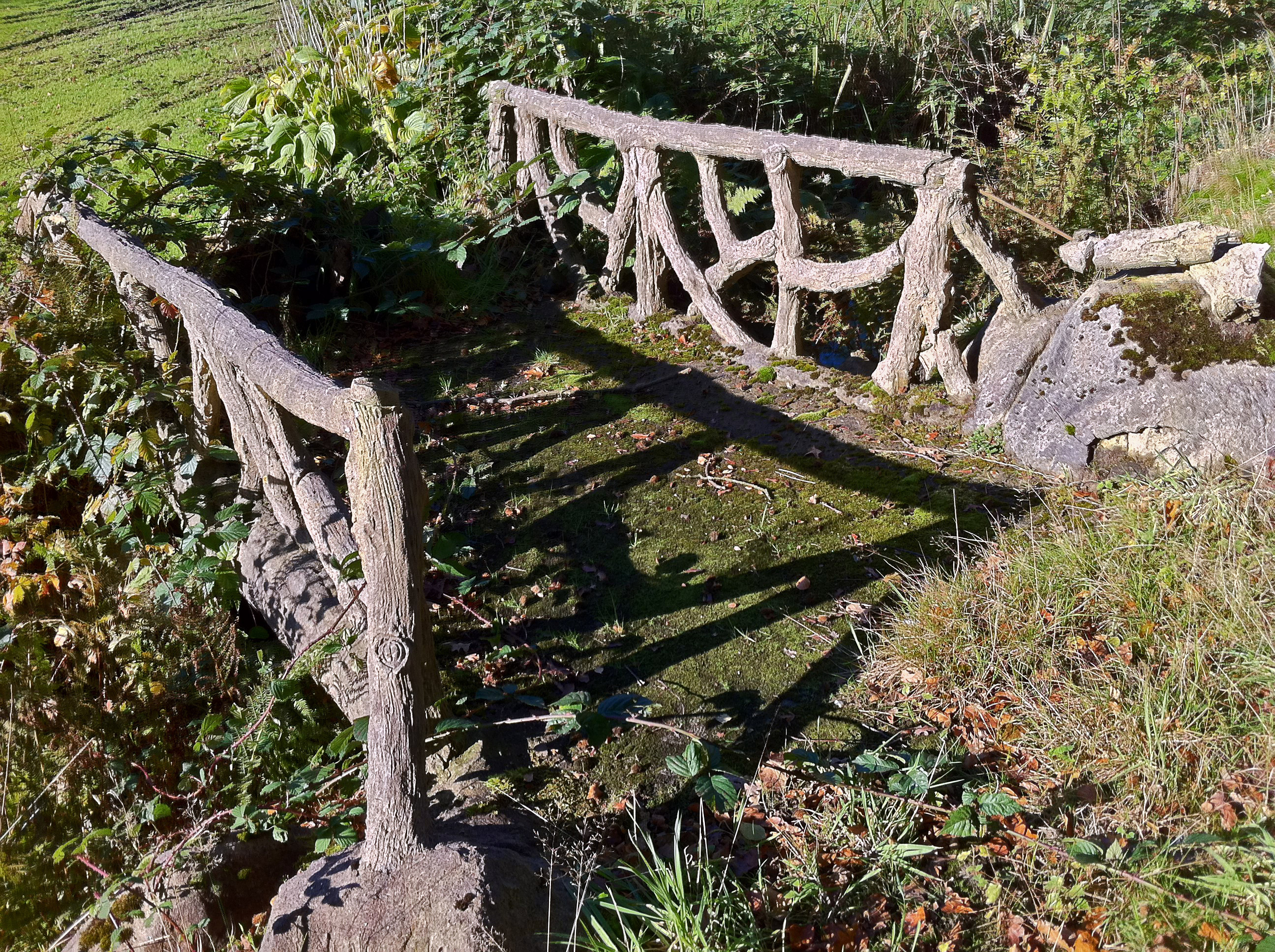
Bridge with faux bois railings at Soestdijk Palace.

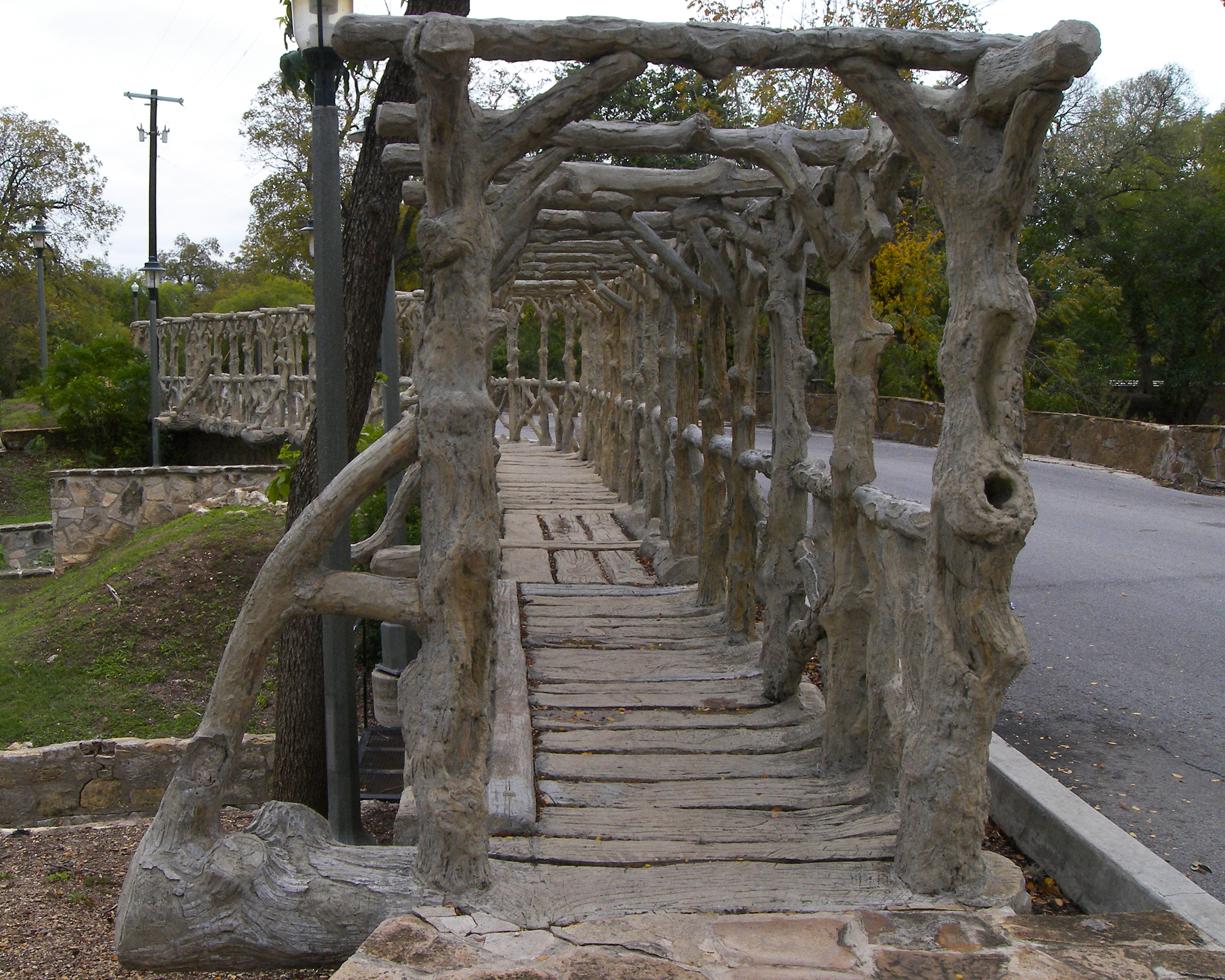
Brackenridge Park bridge by Dionicio Rodriguez in San Antonio, Texas.

Faux bois (from the French for false wood) refers to the artistic imitation of wood or wood grains in various media. The craft has roots in the Renaissance with trompe-l'œil. It was probably first crafted with concrete using an iron armature by garden craftsmen in France called "rocailleurs" using common iron materials: rods, barrel bands, and chicken wire.

Early examples of the craft survive at Parc des Buttes-Chaumont opened for an exposition in Paris in 1867. In 1873, the inventor of ferrocement, Joseph Monier expanded his patents to include bridges. He designed the first bridge of reinforced concrete, crossing the moat at the Chateau Chazelet, in France. It was sculpted to resemble timbers and logs.

Ferrocement faux bois uses a combination of concrete, mortar and grout applied to a steel frame or armature to sculpt lifelike representations of wooden objects. Final sculpting can be done while the mixture is wet, in a putty state, or slightly stiff. Techniques vary among artisans. Most popular in the late 19th century through the 1940s, ferrocement faux bois has largely disappeared with the passing of those most expert in its practice. What few objects remain from that peak period (mostly in the form of garden art, such as planters and birdbaths) are now highly prized by collectors.

In Mexico and Texas, this style is sometimes known as "el trabajo rústico" (the rustic work). It is often characterized by a more realistic look in both composition and coloring, as well as a more finely detailed finish than comparable European work. One highly regarded artist who worked in this style was Dionicio Rodriguez, a Mexican who relocated to Texas in the early 1920s. Although Rodriguez is not widely known, his large-scale faux bois installations have been listed on the National Register of Historic Places. Dionicio's great-nephew Carlos Cortes is one of the handful of artists still creating faux bois today.

Adrian Janes of Janes, Beebe & Company produced some of the earliest mass-produced cast iron benches and chairs using the faux bois style, an example of which is held by the Smithsonian Institution as inventory no. 1980.006.

== See also ==
- Faux painting
- Graining
