= Mary Eleanor Brackenridge =

- Born: March 7, 1837; Warrick County, Indiana, US
- Died: February 14, 1924 (aged 86); San Antonio, Texas, US
- Resting place: Brackenridge Family Cemetery Jackson County, Texas; 28.94860°N 96.54000°W
- Education: Anderson Female Seminary
- Known for: Founded Woman's Club of San Antonio; Women's Suffrage; Founder and 1st Regent, San Antonio de Bexar Chapter, NSDAR; TWU

Mary Eleanor Brackenridge (March 7, 1837 – February 14, 1924) was one of three women on the first board of regents at Texas Woman's University, the first women in the state of Texas to sit on a governing board of any university. She was active in women's clubs and was a co-founder of the Woman's Club of San Antonio. Brackenridge was a leader in Texas suffrage organizations and helped get the Nineteenth Amendment to the United States Constitution passed. She was the first woman in San Antonio to register to vote. Although it's the Brackenridge name in Texas that is associated with wealth, philanthropy and achievement, Brackenridge qualified as a member of the Daughters of the American Revolution through her mother's lineage. Miss Brackenridge was a founding member and the first Regent of the oldest DAR chapter in San Antonio, the San Antonio de Bexar Chapter, established on December 11, 1902.

== Background ==
Mary Eleanor Brackenridge was born March 7, 1837, in Warrick County, Indiana. She was the eldest daughter in a family of eight children born to John Adams Brackenridge and his wife Isabella Helena McCullough. She is often referred to as Eleanor, or M. Eleanor, in historical documentation. The family moved to Jackson County, Texas, in 1853, but she remained behind and graduated in 1855 from Anderson's Female Academy in New Albany, Indiana.

Her father died during the Civil War, and she and her mother later moved into the San Antonio home of her brother George Washington Brackenridge. He appointed her director of the San Antonio National Bank and the San Antonio Loan and Trust, both institutions established by him. In San Antonio, she was active in the Women's Christian Temperance Union (WCTU), the Order of the Eastern Star and the Presbyterian Church. She was a member of the Texas Mothers' Congress, a predecessor to the Texas Congress of Parents and Teachers (Texas PTA). In 1906, Brackenridge was named vice-president of the San Antonio Health Protection Association, formed to combat tuberculosis in the city.

== Women's suffrage ==
Her achievements through women's clubs and suffrage organizations lived beyond her lifetime. Most notably, the Woman's Club of San Antonio and Texas Woman's University are still active today. Through these efforts, she was able to promote the welfare and advancement of women and children. In 1911, she made a study of the state's legal code and published a pamphlet entitled The Legal Status of Texas Women. The WCTU and women's organizations often worked hand-in-hand for suffrage. The Texas Woman Suffrage Association was begun in 1903 in Houston by Annette Finnigan who served as its first president. When Finnigan left Texas, the organization stalled. It was fused with new energy in 1913 and was renamed the Texas Equal Suffrage Association. At the organization's convention in San Antonio, Brackenridge was named its president. Within two years, the organization had twenty-one chapters. On June 28, 1919, Texas became the first southern state to ratify the passage of the Nineteenth Amendment to the United States Constitution, giving women the right to vote. Brackenridge became the first woman in San Antonio to register to vote.

=== The Woman's Club of San Antonio ===
On October 1, 1898, the Woman's Club of San Antonio was organized by Brackenridge and Marin B. Fenwick., a precursor of other similar civic and social organizations in the city. The organization was the vanguard of Texas women's clubs in promoting women's suffrage. Brackenridge served as the organization's president for the first seven years of its existence. There were eighteen charter members when the organization began. The club's organization included departments that focused on specific needs of women and children. The departments represented needs such as legal issues, employment for women, health needs, community activism, and educational needs. In 1905, the club established the Isabella H. Brackenridge Scholarship for students at University of Texas Medical Branch. On July 8, 1926, the organization bought the David J. and May Bock Woodward House and currently uses it as their headquarters. The Woodward house was placed on the National Register of Historic Places listings in Bexar County, Texas February 16, 1996.

=== Texas Woman's University ===
Texas Woman's University (TWU) came into being as a result of lobbying efforts of individual proponents working in conjunction with the Women's Christian Temperance Union (WCTU), Texas Federation of Women's Clubs (TFWC), Texas Woman's Press Association (TWPA). and the Grange. The Girls Industrial College was created by House Bill 35 of the Twenty-seventh Texas Legislature. It was signed into law by Texas Governor Joseph D. Sayers on April 6, 1901. The name was changed in 1905 to the College of Industrial Arts. In 1934 the school was renamed as Texas College for Women, and renamed to its current Texas Woman's University in 1957. The school's first board of regents was appointed by Governor Sayers in 1902. The three influential women who served on that first board were instrumental in the establishment of the university: Mary Eleanor Brackenridge, Texas WCTU president Helen M. Stoddard and Eliza S. R. Johnson, wife of State Senator Cone Johnson and daughter of Elijah Sterling Clack Robertson. They were the first women to sit on a governing board of any university in Texas. Brackenridge served as a regent until her death. The Mary Eleanor Brackenridge Club at TWU was established to help broaden the cultural awareness of its members. The Stoddard Domitory and the Brackenridge Dormitory were the first two on-campus residence halls at TWU. The current Mary Eleanor Brackenridge Student Union at TWU is named in her honor.

== Family lineage and DAR membership ==
Mary Eleanor Brackenridge was a founding member and the first Regent of the San Antonio de Bexar Chapter, Daughters of the American Revolution, qualified by her ancestor, Charles Baskin through her maternal lineage. Charles Baskin was a lieutenant in the Augusta County Virginia militia.

The Brackenridge name in Texas descended from Scotch-Irish Robert Breckenridge Sr., who emigrated from Northern Ireland with his brother Alexander c1730. Alexander, whose descendants spell their name Breckinridge, moved to Virginia. Robert Sr., whose descendants spell their name either Breckenridge or Brackenridge, stayed in Cumberland County, Pennsylvania. Robert Jr. (c1735-c1779) was killed in an Indian raid. His son John Brackenridge (c. 1772 – May 2, 1844) was raised in Washington, D.C., and was appointed Chaplain of the United States Senate in 1811. His son John Adams Brackenridge was the father of Mary Eleanor Brackenridge. John Adams Brackenridge (1800–1862) was a graduate of Princeton University and a politically active lawyer in Warrick County, Indiana.

Isabella Helena McCullough (1811–1886) married John Adams Brackenridge in 1827. Her maternal Scotch-Irish ancestor Rev. John Craig was from County Antrim, Northern Ireland. Her father James McCullough was from Belfast, Northern Island. The lineage of James McCullough's wife Mary Craig Grimes was the criteria for acceptance into the Daughters of the American Revolution. The parents of Mary Craig Grimes were William Grimes and Isabella Helena Baskin. Tracing the lineage through Isabella Helena Baskin, her grandparents were Charles Baskin and Mary Craig. The DAR certified that Charles Baskin (1741–1822) served during the American Revolutionary War under General Daniel Morgan.

All of the eight children of John Adams and Isabella Brackenridge were born in Indiana. The family moved to Texas in 1853. Many family members are buried in the Brackenridge Family Cemetery in Jackson County, Texas.

=== Brothers and sisters of Mary Eleanor Brackenridge ===
Sometime after the death of her father in 1862, Eleanor and her mother Isabella moved into her brother George's home in San Antonio. He supported his mother for the rest of her life, and took care of Eleanor until his own death. The siblings of Mary Eleanor Brackenridge were as follows:

==== Brothers ====
John Thomas Brackenridge (1828–1877), known to the family as Tom, gave up his Indiana law practice to join the family mercantile business in Texas. Tom served in the Confederate States Army under John B. Magruder. In 1877, he became president of First National Bank of Austin. Tom married twice, to E. R. Smith and to Mary E. Dupuy. He is buried in Oakwood Cemetery in Austin.

George Washington Brackenridge (1832–1920) was a philanthropist, businessman and the longest-serving Regent for the University of Texas. He donated much of his wealth and landholdings to benefit students. Brackenridge established two San Antonio banking institutions. He is the namesake and chief benefactor of Brackenridge Park in San Antonio, and the adjoining Mahncke Park was made possible through his donation of land. George never married, and is buried in the family cemetery in Jackson County.

James M. Brackenridge (1834–1905) enlisted with the Confederate States Army, and afterwards became a judge in Travis County, Texas. He married Mattie Owen and is buried in Oakwood Cemetery in Austin.

Robert John Brackenridge (1839–1918) served in the Confederate States Army in his brother Tom's unit in Texas. Captured and imprisoned, he was paroled through the political influence of brother George. Brackenridge Hospital in Austin is named in recognition of his fund raising efforts which helped build the hospital. He was married to Mary T. Lyons and is buried with her in the Oakwood Cemetery Annex.

==== Sisters ====
Lenora Helena Brackenridge Matthews (1842–1918) was a civic activist who helped establish a local chapter of the American Red Cross. She married Erastus Allen Matthews and is buried in the San Marcos cemetery, Plot H.

Elizabeth Ann Brackenridge (1845–1847), known as Lizzie, is buried in Indiana.

Elizabeth Ann Brackenridge (1848–1856), known as Lillie, is buried in the family cemetery.

== Death ==
Mary Eleanor Brackenridge never married. She died of a cerebral hemorrhage on February 14, 1924, and is buried in the family cemetery in Jackson County, Texas.
