= Brackenridge Park Bridge =

Historic iron bridge located in San Antonio, Texas

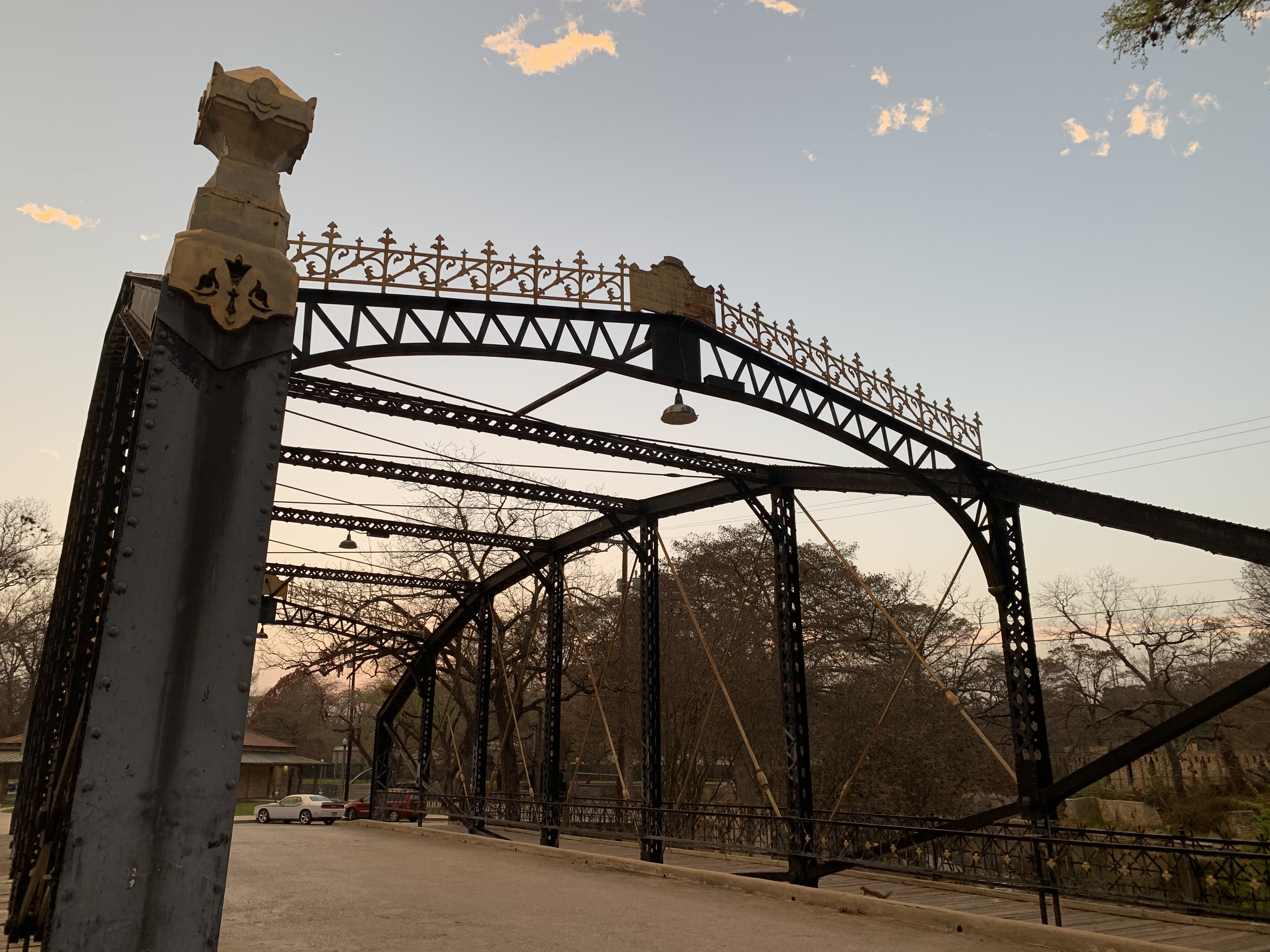
- Eastern approach to the Brackenridge Park Bridge, March 2021
- Coordinates: 29.4632°N 98.4692°W
- Carries: Motor vehicles, pedestrians, and bicycles
- Crosses: San Antonio River
- Locale: Brackenridge Way, San Antonio, Texas
- Other name: St. Mary's Street Bridge (1890-1925)
- Named for: George Washington Brackenridge
- ID number: 150150B03825002

Characteristics
- Design: Lenticular truss bridge
- Total length: 95.1 feet (29.0 m)
- Width: 28.2 feet (8.6 m)
- Height: 16.2 feet (4.9 m)
- Longest span: 92.8 feet (28.3 m)
- No. of spans: Single
- Clearance above: 14.5 feet (4.4 m)
- No. of lanes: Two, multiway traffic

History
- Architect: Berlin Iron Bridge Company
- Construction end: 1890, relocated 1925

Statistics
- Daily traffic: 1,213 (January 2020)
- Brackenridge Park Bridge
- U.S. Historic district – Contributing property
- Part of: Brackenridge Park Historic District (ID11000513)
- Designated CP: August 4, 2011

Location
- Interactive map of Brackenridge Park Bridge

The Brackenridge Park Bridge is a historic iron Lenticular truss bridge located in San Antonio, Texas. The bridge was built in 1890 and remains open for vehicular and pedestrian traffic. Composed of a single truss of just over 95 feet (29 m), it is one of the shortest lenticular truss bridges in the country and one of just eight located west of the Mississippi River. The bridge is a contributing property to the Brackenridge Park Historic District, which was listed on the National Register of Historic Places in August 2011.

== History ==
The earliest reference to a bridge spanning the San Antonio River was made in 1736, with river crossings in the city remaining largely dependent on wooden bridges for over 130 years. These wooden bridges, often crudely built, were susceptible to rot and often damaged during flooding events. It was not until 1868 that the first iron bridge was constructed in the city. This was an 82-foot-long (25 m) pedestrian footbridge built by Boston-based Moseley Ironworks at St. Mary's Street. While additional iron bridges were planned by the city in the 1870s and 1880s, budget constraints limited such construction. During these two decades, only one additional iron bridge was constructed. This was the Houston Street bridge, built between 1871 and 1873. It was not until more than 15 years after the completion of this bridge before additional iron bridges would be built in the city.

The Brackenridge Park Bridge was originally designed and built by the Berlin Iron Bridge Company in 1890, one of five such iron bridges commissioned by the city from the company in that year. The bridge was originally located Downtown at St. Mary's Street, where it spanned the San Antonio River. Atop the truss, the bridge is decorated with a gold-colored plaque and ornamentation. The plaque includes the name of the builder, city engineer, mayor, and the date of construction. The decision by Mayor Bryan Callaghan Jr. to place his name on the plaque in gold letters stirred local controversy, with his re-election efforts becoming known as the "Letters of Gold Campaign."

In the aftermath of the destructive 1921 floods, massive rebuilding work was conducted to improve downtown infrastructure. In 1925, as part of these efforts, the bridge was moved to its current location at Brackenridge Road within Brackenridge Park, where it still crosses the San Antonio River. Three of the sister bridges also constructed by the Berlin Iron Bridge Company remain downtown at the Augusta, Crockett, and South Presa street river crossings.

== Photos ==
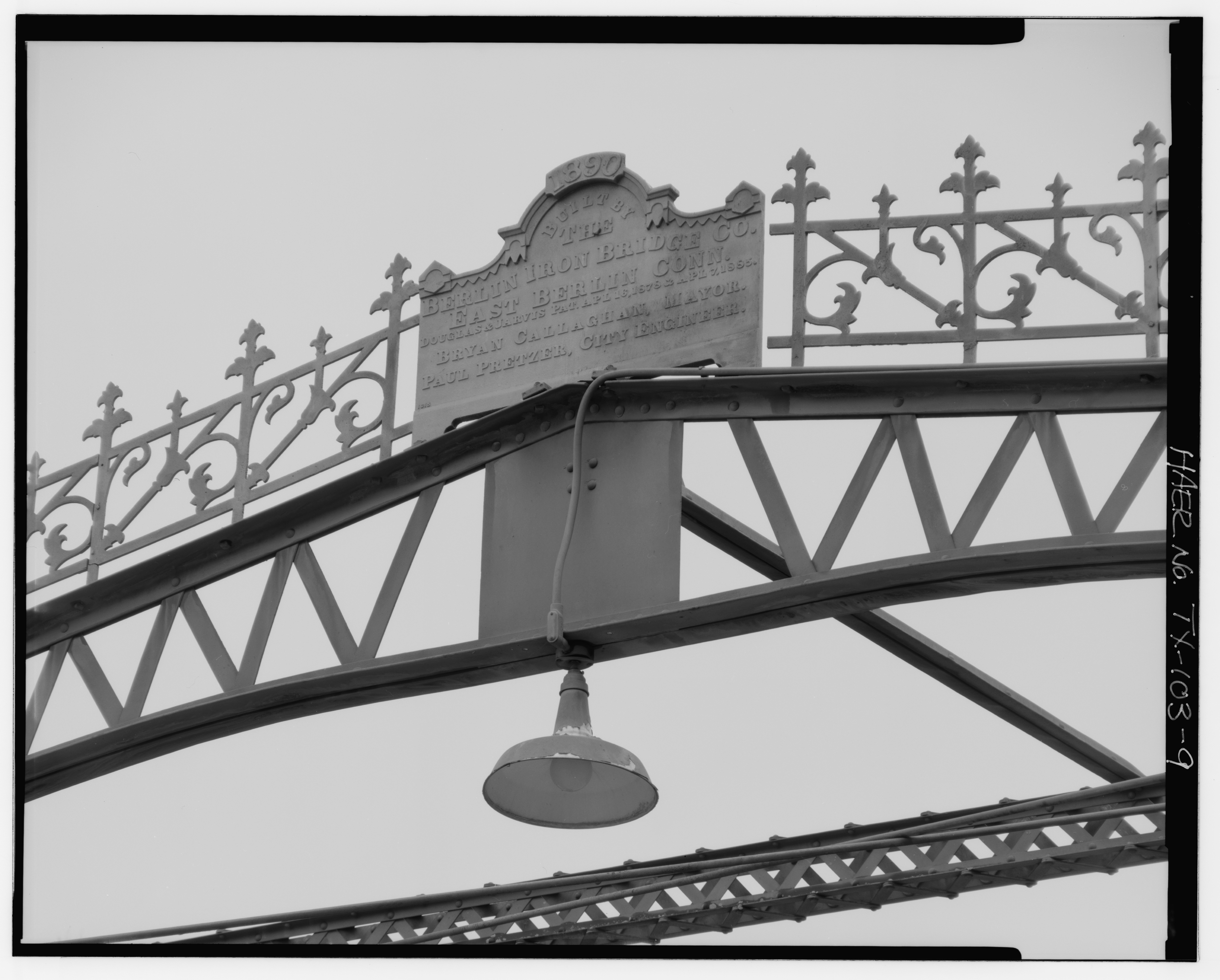
The Berlin Iron Bridge Co. plaque on the top of the bridge.

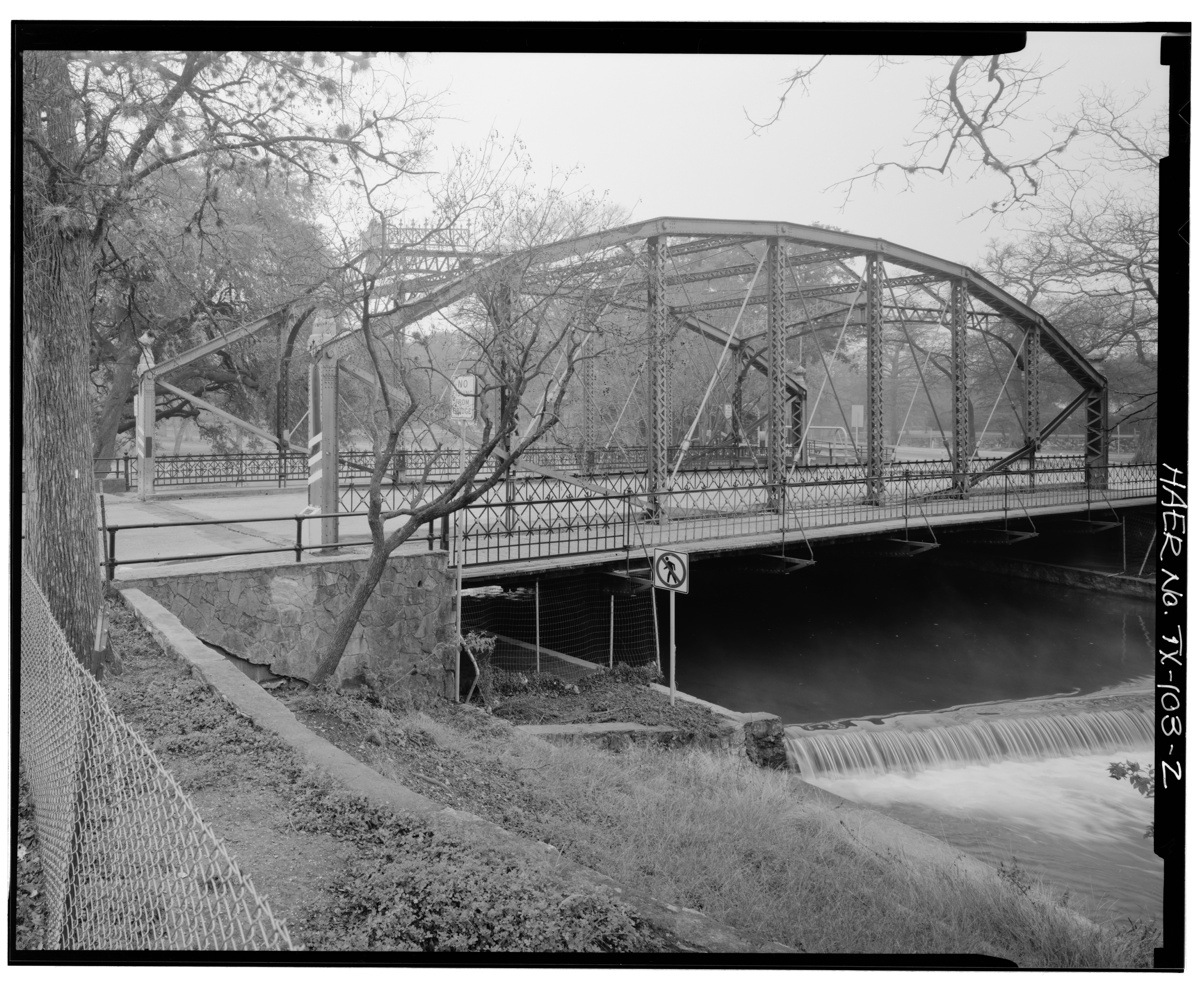
The North side of the bridge, looking South.

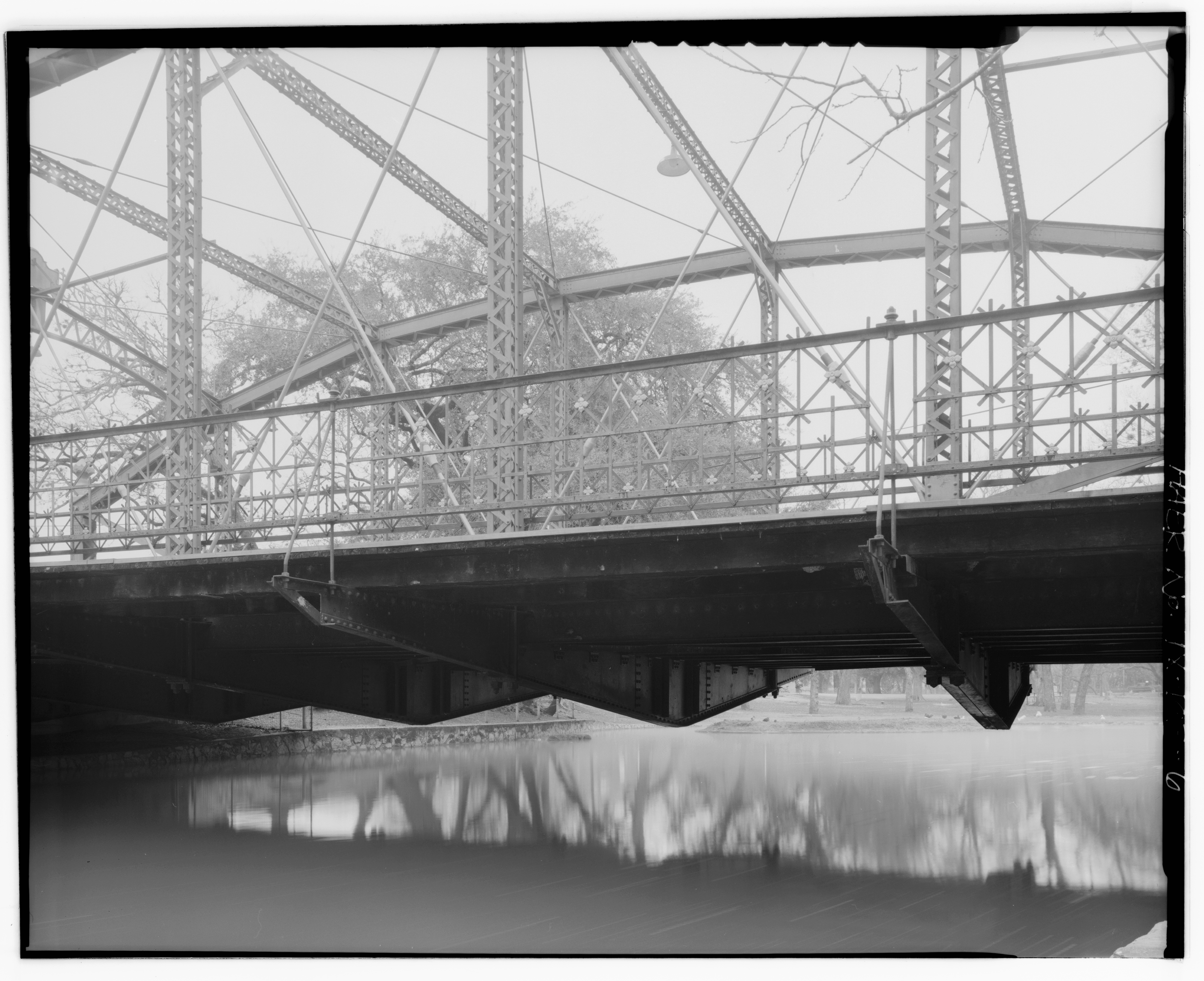
Floor system and lateral bracing of the bridge.

== See also ==
- List of bridges documented by the Historic American Engineering Record in Texas
- List of bridges on the National Register of Historic Places in Texas
