= George Washington Brackenridge =

American philanthropist

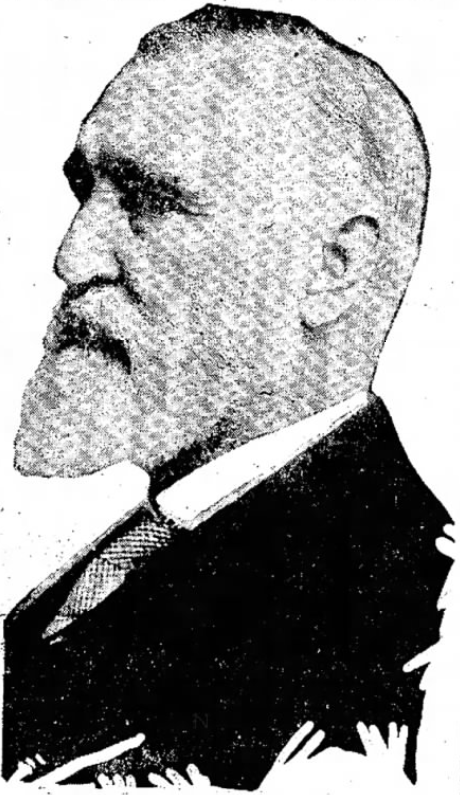
- Born: January 14, 1832; Warrick County, Indiana, U.S.
- Died: December 28, 1920 (aged 88); San Antonio, Texas, U.S.
- Resting place: Brackenridge Family Cemetery Jackson County, Texas; 28.94860°N 96.54000°W
- Education: Hanover College; Indiana University Bloomington; Harvard University
- Known for: Philanthropy; Regent Univ Texas; San Antonio Water Works; Banking industry
- Political party: Republican

George Washington Brackenridge (January 14, 1832 – December 28, 1920) was a philanthropist and the longest-serving Regent for the University of Texas. His donations of time, land holdings and wealth expanded the university and provided educational opportunities for women and other minorities. He was an advocate of women's suffrage and women's educational opportunities. He was also a business man who made his initial wealth as a profiteer during the Civil War. Brackenridge organized two banking institutions in San Antonio and served as their president. He was president of the San Antonio Water Works Company. Alamo Heights in Bexar County was once his residence and was named by him. His mansion Fernridge is now part of University of the Incarnate Word campus. Brackenridge Park, San Antonio Japanese Tea Garden and Mahncke Park in San Antonio were made possible through his donations of land holdings.

== Brackenridge family background ==
The Brackenridge name in Texas descended from Scotch-Irish Robert Breckenridge Sr., who emigrated from Northern Ireland with his brother Alexander about 1730. Alexander's descendants spell their name Breckinridge. Alexander and his family migrated to Virginia. Robert Sr. stayed in Cumberland County, Pennsylvania. The descendants of Robert Sr. spell their name either Breckenridge or Brackenridge. Robert Jr. (c1735-c1779) was killed in an Indian raid, and his children were taken in by separate families. His son John Brackenridge (c. 1772 – May 2, 1844) was raised in Washington, D.C. He became the first Presbyterian minister in Washington D.C. and was appointed Chaplain of the United States Senate in 1811. John Brackenridge's children were daughter Attilia Ann Brackenridge, and sons James Madison Brackenridge, Thomas Jefferson Brackenridge and John Adams Brackenridge, who was the father of George Washington Brackenridge.

John Adams Brackenridge (1800–1862) was a law graduate of Princeton University who opened a practice in Warrick County, Indiana. He was a Whig Party elector who supported Henry Clay's 1844 campaign for the President of the United States. Through his political activities, he became acquainted with Abraham Lincoln.

Isabella Helena McCullough (1811–1886) married John Adams Brackenridge in 1827. Her maternal Scotch-Irish ancestor Rev. John Craig emigrated from County Antrim, Northern Ireland in 1734. Her father James McCullough at age four emigrated with his parents from Belfast, Northern Island. The lineage of James McCullough's wife Mary Craig Grimes was the criteria for acceptance of (George's sister) Mary Eleanor Brackenridge's acceptance into the Daughters of the American Revolution. The parents of Mary Craig Grimes were William Grimes and Isabella Helena Baskin. Tracing the lineage through Isabella Helena Baskin, her grandparents were Charles Baskin and Mary Craig. The DAR certified that Charles Baskin (1741–1822) served during the American Revolutionary War under General Daniel Morgan.

All of the eight children of John Adams and Isabella Brackenridge were born in Indiana. John, Isabella and many of their children are buried in the Brackenridge Family Cemetery in Jackson County, Texas.

George was the second child, born January 14, 1832. He was educated at Hanover College and Indiana University. He was trained as a surveyor and engineer and studied law at Harvard University. At the age of eighteen, George was sent to Port Lavaca, Texas to peddle goods. Based upon his success, the family moved to Texana in 1853 and opened a mercantile business.

=== Brothers and sisters of George Washington Brackenridge ===
The Brackenridge family was a house divided during the Civil War, with father John and his son George being loyal to Abraham Lincoln and the Union, and the other three sons joining the Confederate States Army. George shared the same views as his sister Eleanor in support of prohibition and a woman's right to vote. After his father's death, George's mother Isabella and sister Eleanor moved into his home. George supported his mother for the rest of her life and took care of Eleanor until his own death. Eleanor died only four years after George. The siblings of George Washington Brackenridge were as follows:

==== Brothers ====
John Thomas Brackenridge (1828–1877), known to the family as Tom, gave up his Indiana law practice to join the family mercantile business in Texas. Tom served in the Confederate States Army under John B. Magruder. In 1877, he became president of First National Bank of Austin. Tom married twice, to E. R. Smith and to Mary E. Dupuy. He is buried in Oakwood Cemetery in Austin.

James M. Brackenridge (1834–1905) enlisted with the Confederate States Army, and afterwards became a judge in Travis County, Texas. He married Mattie Owen and is buried in Oakwood Cemetery in Austin.

Robert John Brackenridge (1839–1918) served in the Confederate States Army in his brother Tom's unit in Texas. Captured and imprisoned, he was paroled through the political influence of brother George. Brackenridge Hospital in Austin is named in recognition of his fund raising efforts which helped build the hospital. He was married to Mary T. Lyons and is buried with her in the Oakwood Cemetery Annex.

==== Sisters ====
Mary Eleanor Brackenridge (1837–1924), known as Eleanor, was a director of two banking institutions and served on the first board of regents at Texas Woman's University. She organized the Woman's Club of San Antonio in 1898 and focused its goals on women's suffrage and social issues of the day. Eleanor organized the Texas Woman Suffrage Association and was a prohibitionist who supported the Women's Christian Temperance Union. She became the first woman in San Antonio to register to vote after passage of the Nineteenth Amendment to the United States Constitution. She never married and is buried in the family cemetery.

Lenora Helena Brackenridge Mathews (1842–1918) was a civic activist who helped establish a local chapter of the American Red Cross. She married Erastus Allen Mathews and is buried in the family cemetery.

Elizabeth Ann Brackenridge (1845–1847), known as Lizzie, is buried in Indiana.

Elizabeth Ann Brackenridge (1848–1856), known as Lillie, is buried in the family cemetery.

== Civil War ==
Brackenridge became a wealthy man through war profiteering. He was engaged in evading the Confederate States of America's cotton export ban to England and France. Brackenridge purchased cotton directly from the growers and shipped it out of Matamoros to New York. His business partners were his father John, James H. Bates who had accompanied the family from Indiana, and Charles Stillman. His father and Bates died early in the venture. Eventually, Brackenridge was forced to flee Texas. He traveled to Washington, D.C., where President Lincoln appointed him United States Treasury agent on July 30, 1863. He worked for the Treasury Department in New Orleans after the capture of that city by Union forces. As Lincoln's representative, he was dispatched to Mexico in 1864 to try to persuade Benito Juárez to cease cotton trade with the Confederacy.

== San Antonio National Bank, San Antonio Loan and Trust ==
Brackenridge organized the San Antonio National Bank in 1866, as well as serving as its president. He is also credited as the architect for the bank's building on Commerce Street. Listed as the First National Bank of San Antonio, it was added to the National Register of Historic Places listings in Bexar County, Texas on March 16, 1972. Brackenridge also organized and was president of the San Antonio Loan and Trust next door to the bank building. The fourth floor of the second building was used as Brackenridge family living quarters.

== San Antonio Water Works Company ==
City mayor Francois P. Giraud began accepting bids in 1873 for a company to supply city water from the San Antonio River. The 25-year exclusive contract was awarded in 1877 to Jean Baptiste LaCoste to operate the San Antonio Water Works Company . Brackenridge was a financial backer of the company. By 1879, Brackenridge had become the president of the company and held the controlling interest by 1883. Brackenridge sold the company in 1905. In 1925, the city of San Antonio purchased the company and renamed it the City Water Board.

== Education work and endowments ==
=== University of Texas ===
Brackenridge was a member of the Republican Party, but was appointed and reappointed to the Board of Regents of the University of Texas for 25 years by successive Democratic Party governors. Governor John Ireland first appointed him in 1886, and he served until 1911 through reappointments by governors Sul Ross, James Stephen Hogg, Charles A. Culberson, Joseph D. Sayers, S. W. T. Lanham and Thomas Mitchell Campbell. The Thirty-second Texas Legislature in 1911 passed House Concurrent Resolution No. 35 expressing gratitude to Brackenridge for his service as Regent. Governor James E. Ferguson vetoed funding for the university, and Brackenridge offered to fund the university out of his own pocket. He was reappointed by Ferguson's successor Governor William P. Hobby in 1917. His last date as Regent was December 1920. His service record is the longest on the Board of Regents. His financial donations to the university and its students include:

- Funding for Brackenridge Hall male dormitory, University of Texas at Austin
- University Hall for women medical students, built in 1897 at the University of Texas Medical Branch in Galveston
- Funding for the founding of the university's School of Domestic Economy (home economics)
- Loan fund for women students in architecture, law, and medicine
- "The Brackenridge Tract" 500 acres (200 ha; 0.78 sq mi) on the Colorado River in Austin deeded to the University of Texas on June 17, 1910, proposing the university be moved to the tract of land. The proposal was defeated at the time, but the university still owns the land.

=== Miscellaneous ===
Brackenridge served as the first president of the San Antonio School Board in 1899. Educational beneficiaries of Brackenridge's financial donations and political influence include:

- $50,000 in scholarships for women studying medicine at Columbia University
- Carr Hill School, established in 1906 for Mexican American children in San Antonio
- Brackenridge Colored School, San Antonio in 1899
- Navarro School manual training department, San Antonio
- Guadalupe College, Seguin – An institute of higher learning for African Americans. Brackenridge donated a 216-acre tract of land for the college, as well as giving financial support
- Prairie View Normal School

== Alamo Heights and University of the Incarnate Word ==
In 1869, Brackenridge and his mother bought land and an existing house named "The Old Sweet Place" from former San Antonio mayor James R. Sweet. Brackenridge renamed the area Alamo Heights. He enlarged the existing home to three stories and renamed it Fernridge. In 1897, Brackenridge sold the house and 280 acres to the Sisters of Charity of the Incarnate Word, who renamed it Brackenridge Villa. The villa became part of the University of the Incarnate Word in San Antonio.

== Brackenridge Park, Mahncke Park ==
The initial 199 acres (81 ha; 0.311 sq mi) of Brackenridge Park was donated to the city of San Antonio by George Brackenridge in 1899, with Brackenridge later donating additional acreage. More acreage was added in 1915 with a donation from Emma Koehler. The park is currently 343.7 acres (139.1 ha; 0.5370 sq mi) of land. The bronze statue of Brackenridge at the Broadway Street park entrance was sculpted by Pompeo Coppini in the 1930s and cast by Waldine Tauch. The installation of the statue was delayed by red tape until 1972.

Brackenridge also donated 25 acres (10 ha; 0.039 sq mi) of land connecting to Brackenridge Park, and stipulated it be named Mahncke Park, in honor of his friend city alderman and park commissioner Ludwig Mahncke. A committee was formed to raise funds to erect a monument to Mahncke in the park. Situated at the entrance to the park, the monument is a bust of Mahncke created by Pompeo Coppini resting on a granite pedestal designed by Frank Teich.

== Death and estate ==
George Washington Brackenridge never married. He died in San Antonio on December 28, 1920, and was buried with Masonic rites in the family cemetery near Edna, Jackson County. The George W. Brackenridge Foundation currently provides educational scholarships.
