= San Antonio Japanese Tea Garden =

- Chinese Sunken Garden Gate
- U.S. National Register of Historic Places
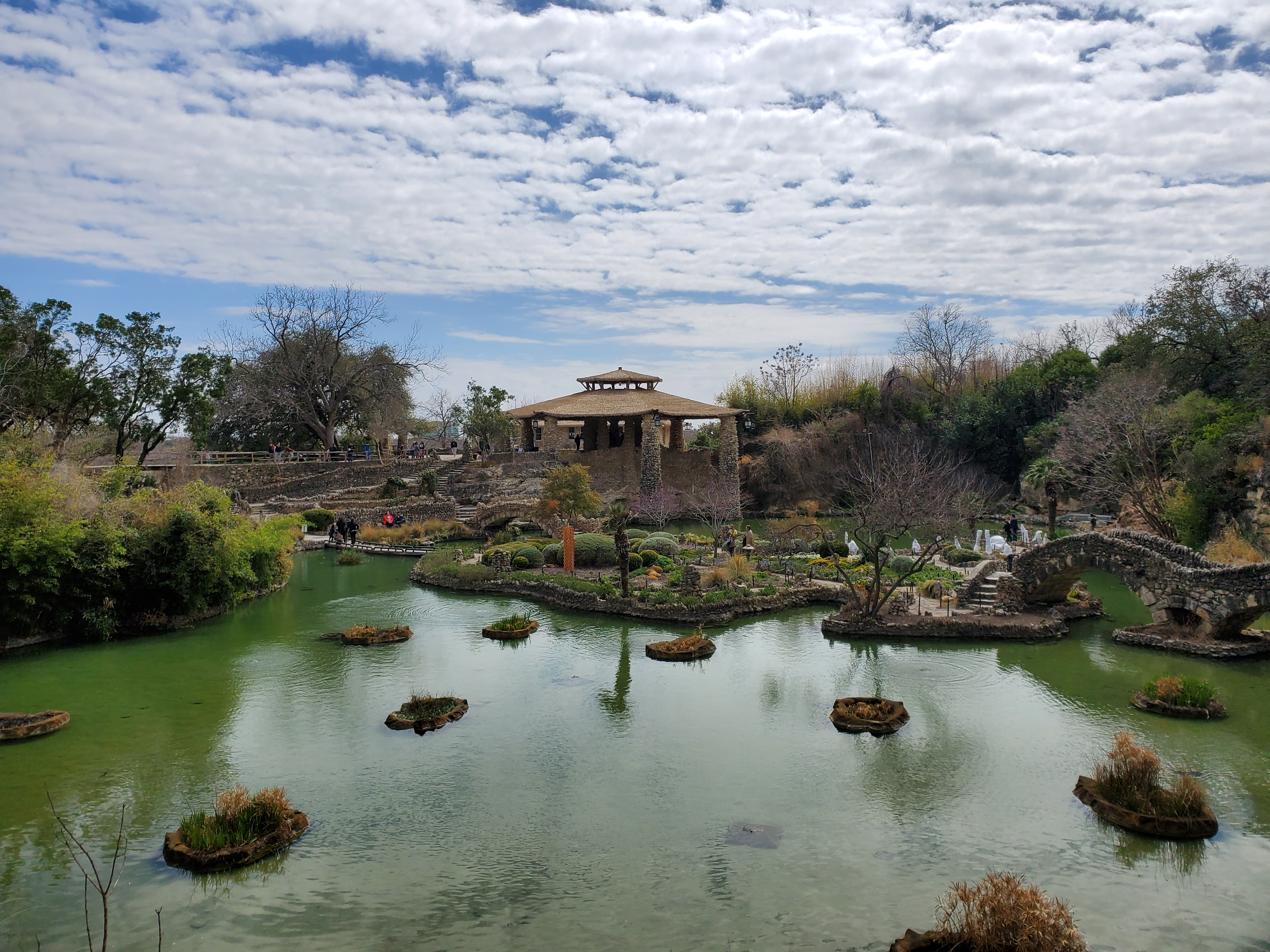
- Japanese Tea Garden in 2022

- Location within Texas Location within the United States
- Location: 3853 N. St. Mary's Street; San Antonio, Texas 78212
- Coordinates: 29°27′40″N 98°28′36″W
- Built: 1942
- Architect: Dionicio Rodriguez
- Architectural style: Faux bois sculpture
- MPS: Sculpture by Dionicio Rodriguez in Texas MPS
- NRHP reference No.: 04001167
- Added to NRHP: October 22, 2004

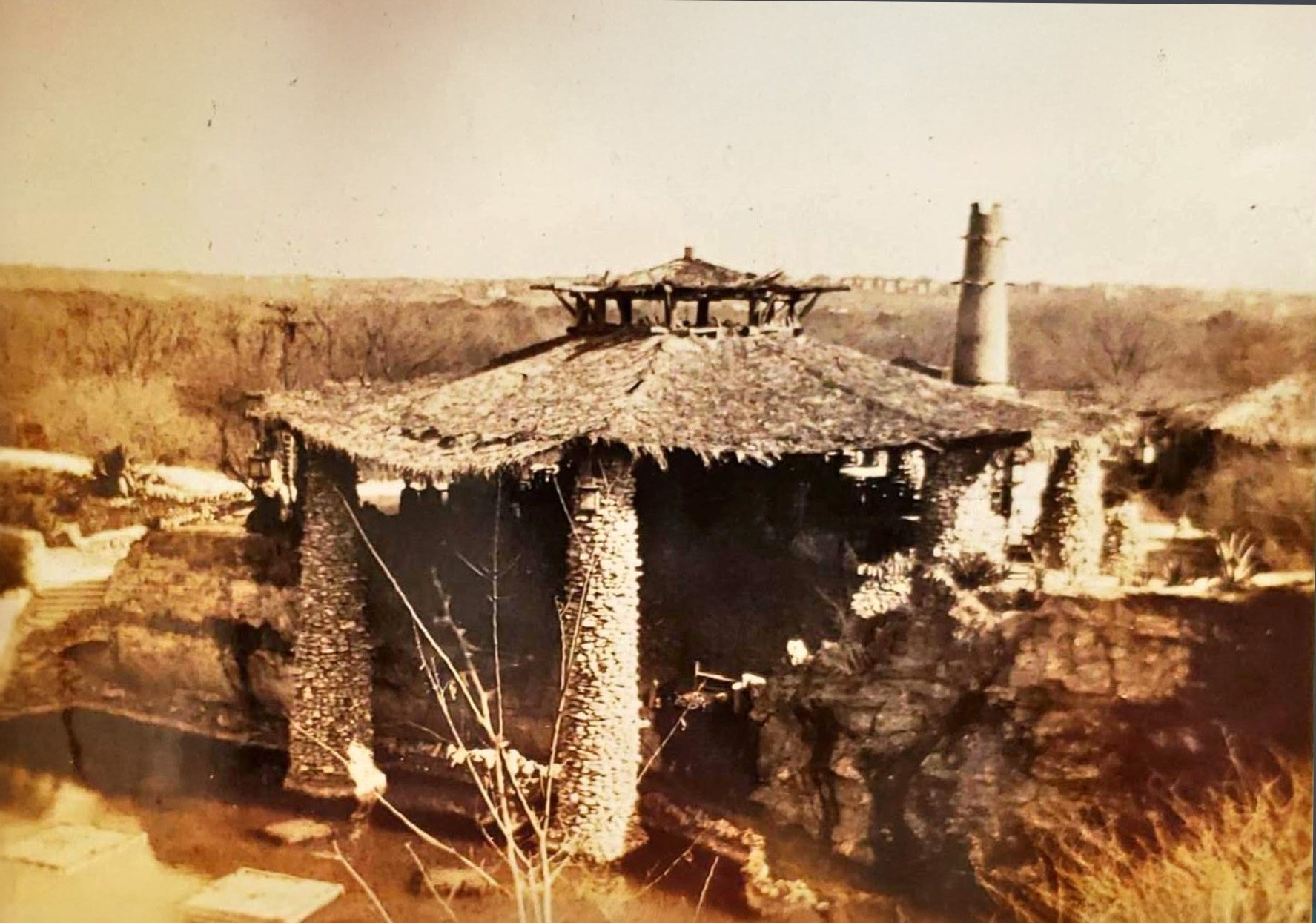
Sunken Garden San Antonio 1925

The San Antonio Japanese Tea Garden, or Sunken Gardens in Brackenridge Park, San Antonio, Texas, opened in an abandoned limestone rock quarry in the early 20th century. It was known also as Chinese Tea Gardens, Chinese Tea Garden Gate, Chinese Sunken Garden Gate and is listed on the U.S. National Register of Historic Places. It is located on the northwestern edge of Brackenridge Park, near the San Antonio Zoo.

== History ==
The San Antonio Japanese Tea Garden (also known as the Sunken Gardens) in the U.S. state of Texas was developed on land donated to the city in 1899 by George Washington Brackenridge, president of the San Antonio Water Works Company. The ground was first broken around 1840 by German masons, who used the readily accessible limestone to supply the construction market. Many San Antonio buildings, including the Menger Hotel, were built with the stone from this quarry on the Rock Quarry Road.

In 1880 the Alamo Cement Company was incorporated and produced cement for 26 years in the kiln, the chimney of which still stands today. Supporting the workforce of the quarry was a small "village", populated primarily by Americans who worked the site. They and their families became popular with tourists, who purchased pottery, hand woven baskets, and food.

About 1917, City Parks Commissioner Ray Lambert visualized an oriental-style garden in the pit of the quarry. His engineer, W.S. Delery, developed plans, and work began when several donors paid for it. In 1918 Lambert used prison labor to shape the quarry into a complex that included walkways, stone arch bridges, an island and a Japanese pagoda.

At the entrance to the garden, Mexican-born artist Dionicio Rodriguez (1891-1955) replicated a Japanese Torii gate in his unique style of concrete construction that imitated wood. In 1919, at the city's invitation, Kimi Eizo Jingu, a local Japanese-American artist, moved to the garden. In 1926, they opened the Bamboo Room, where light lunches and tea were sold. Kimi and Miyoshi Jingu maintained the garden, lived in the park, and raised eight children. Kimi was a representative of the Shizuoka Tea Association and was considered an expert in the tea business nationally. He died in 1938, and in 1942 the family was evicted with the rise of anti-Japanese sentiment of World War II.

The garden was renamed the Chinese Tea Garden, to prevent the razing and vandalism of the tea garden during World War II, as many other cities' Japanese tea gardens were being vandalized. A Chinese-American family, Ted and Ester Wu, opened a snack bar in the pagoda until the early 1960s. In 1984, under the direction of Mayor Henry Cisneros, the city restored the original “Japanese Tea Garden” designation in a ceremony attended by Jingu's children and representatives of the Japanese government.

== Renovation ==
For years the garden sat in neglect and disrepair, becoming a target of graffiti and vandalism. Due to limited funding, the city threatened to close the garden, but the community and parks supporters rallied and lobbied to keep it open.

In 2005, the city used about $550,000 in bond money to reroof the pagoda-like Pavilion and the Jingu House.

In 2007, former Councilwoman Bonnie Conner, vice chairwoman of parks projects for the San Antonio Parks Foundation and former Mayor Lila Cockrell, Parks Foundation president, began a $1.6 million restoration campaign to restore the ponds and waterfall in conjunction with the City of San Antonio. For the public re-opening on March 8, 2008, Jingu family members returned to San Antonio. Mabel Yoshiko Jingu Enkoji, the sixth child of Kimi and Miyoshi Jingu, who was born at the Garden, was the senior Jingu family member at the event.

In 2009, the San Antonio Parks Foundation and the City of San Antonio began work on the $1 million restoration of the historic Jingu house. Work was completed in October 2011. The building is now a Fresh Horizons Creative Catering restaurant, serving light lunches as the Jingu family did in the 1930s.

In recognition of the Tea Garden's origin as a rock quarry that played a prominent role in the development of the cement business, as well as its later redevelopment as a garden, the site is designated a Texas Civil Engineering Landmark, a Registered Texas Historic Landmark, and listed on the National Register of Historic Places.

The Sunken Garden amphitheater is located to the south. It comprises 879 permanently installed seats and has the option of adding folding chairs for a total general admittance of 2,700. The general admittance (standing room) to the fenced grounds of the theater is 4,800 spectators. The Parks and Recreation Department's Cultural Program assumed management of the theater in the early 1970s. In early 1984, a $320,000 renovation of the theater was completed.

== Images ==
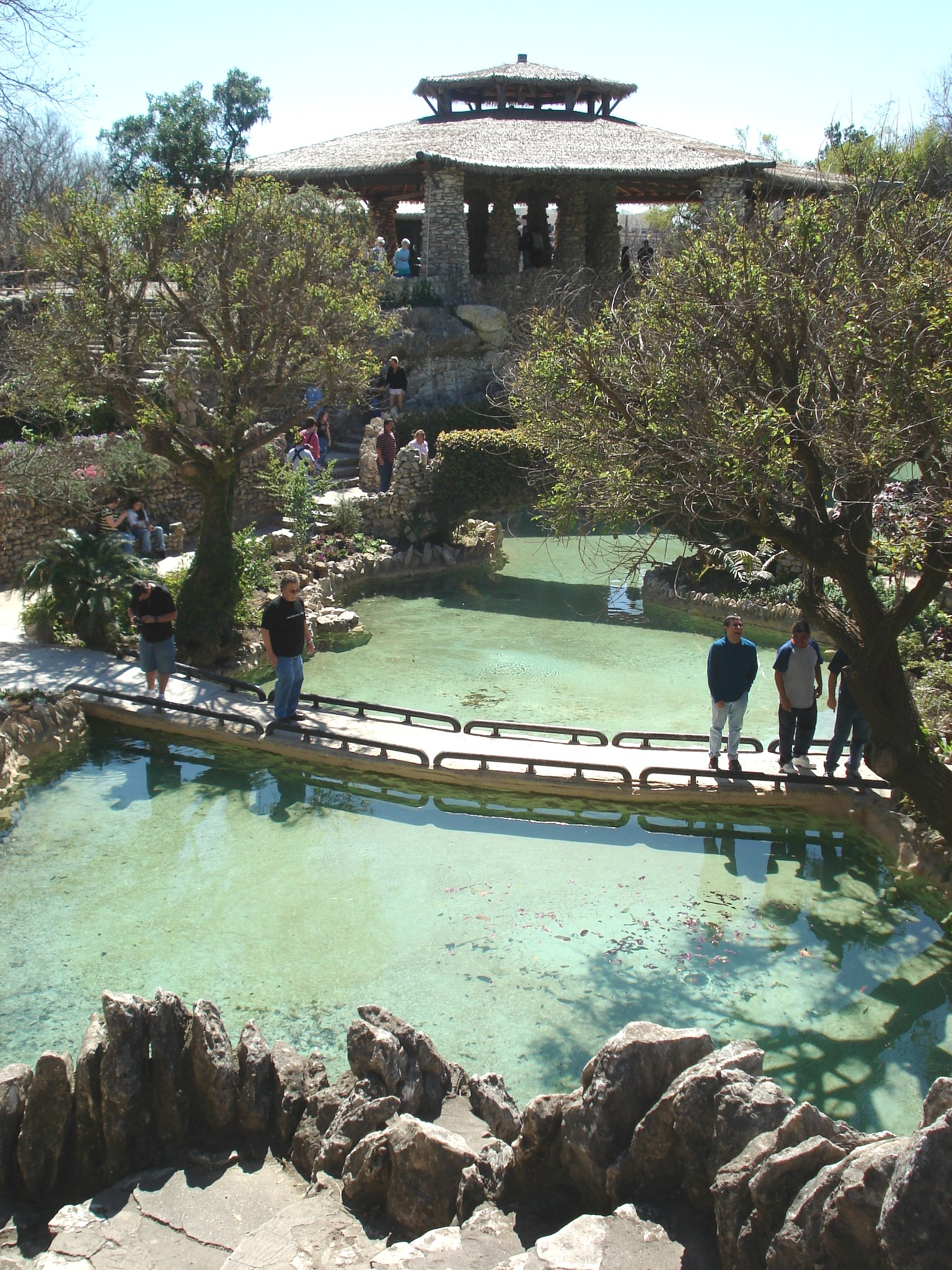
At reopening, March 8, 2008

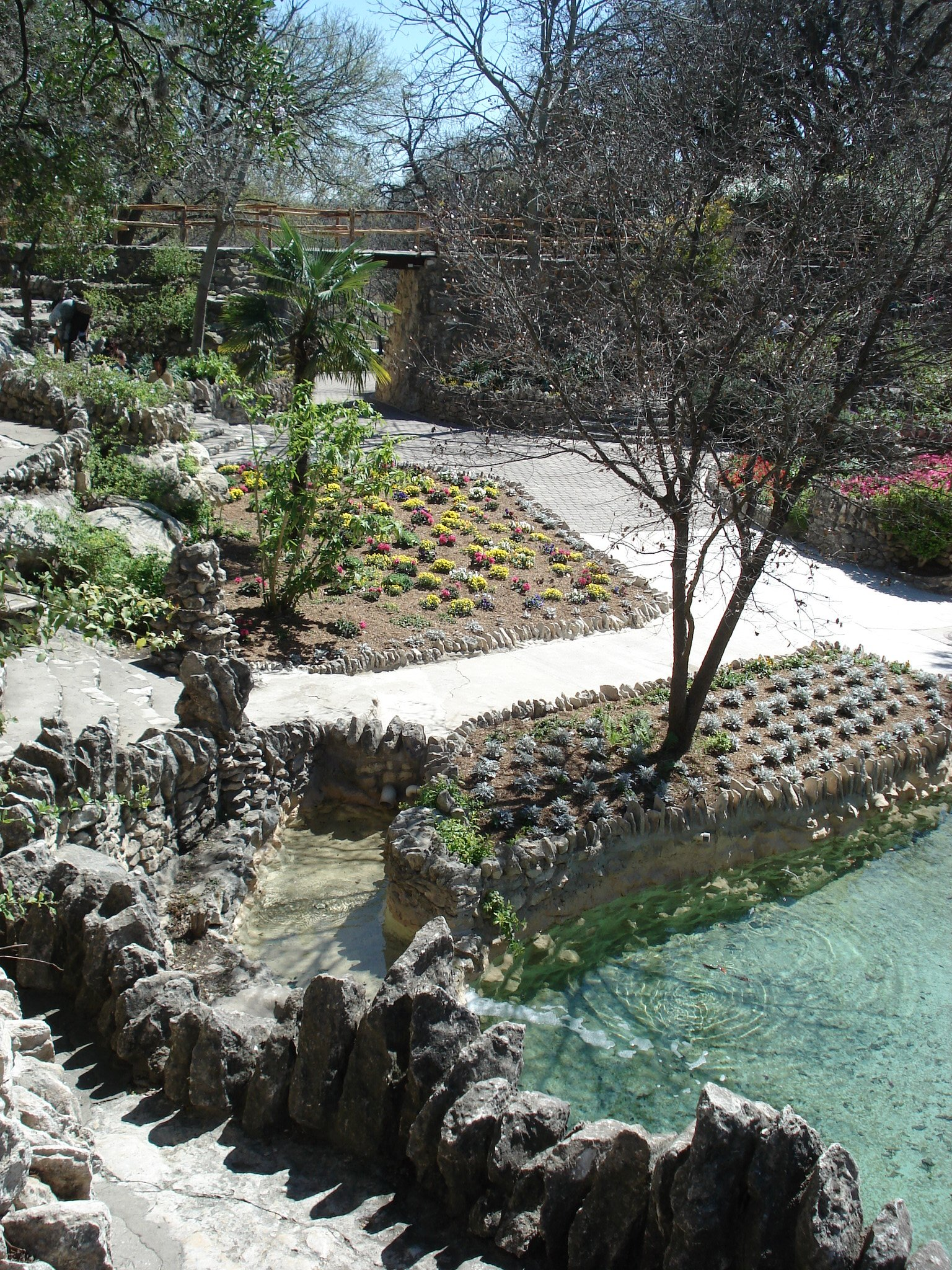
At public reopening

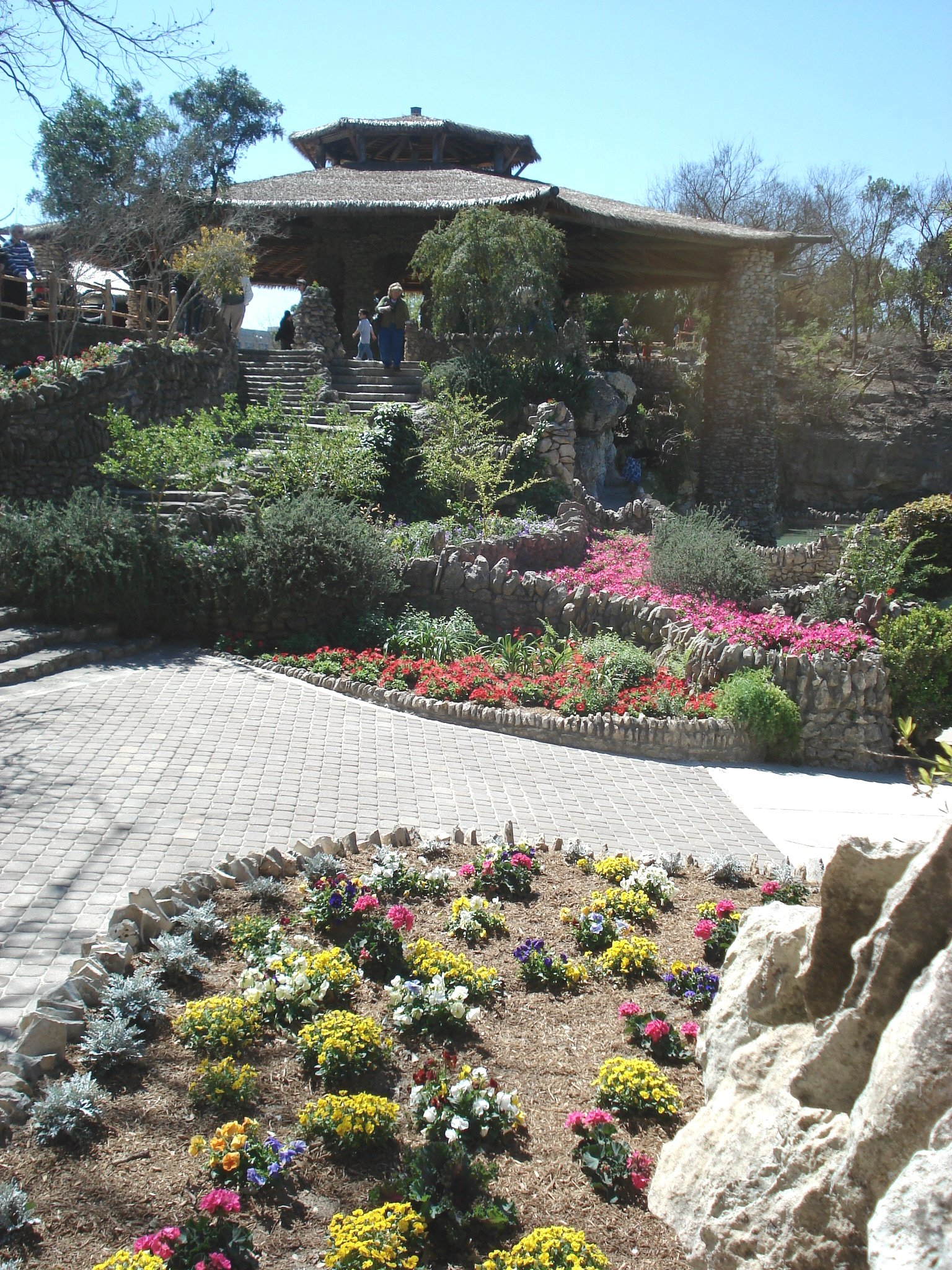
At public reopening

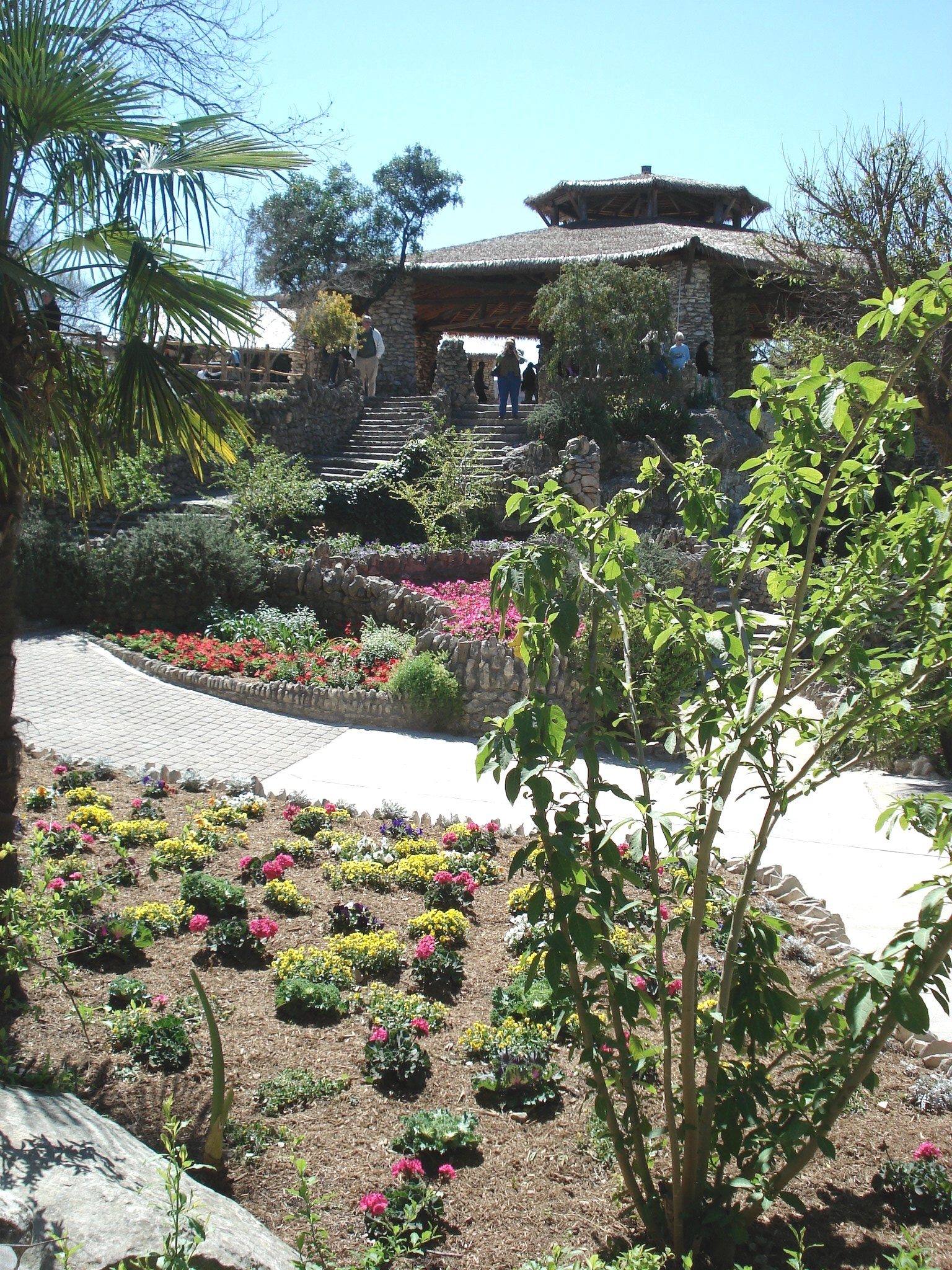
At public reopening

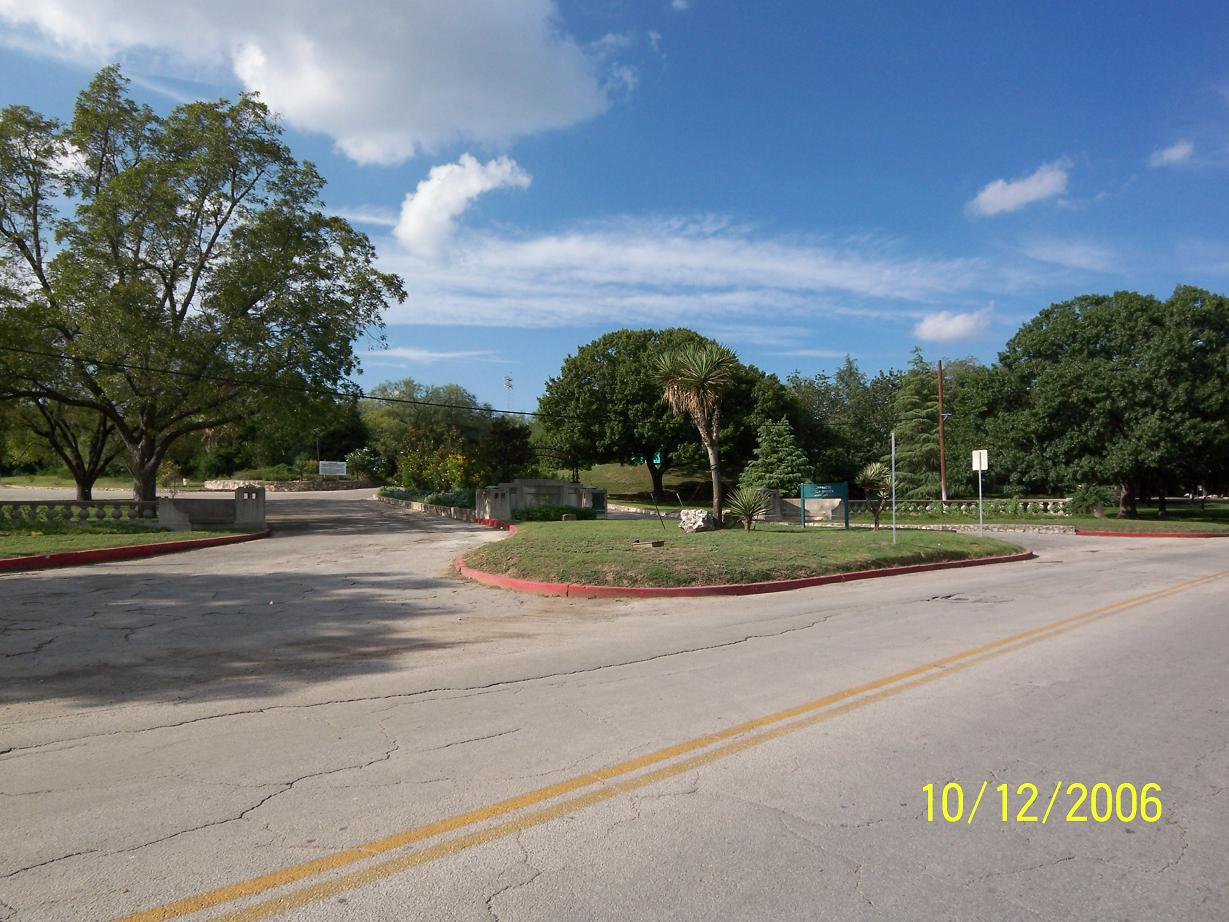
N. St. Mary's Park Entrance

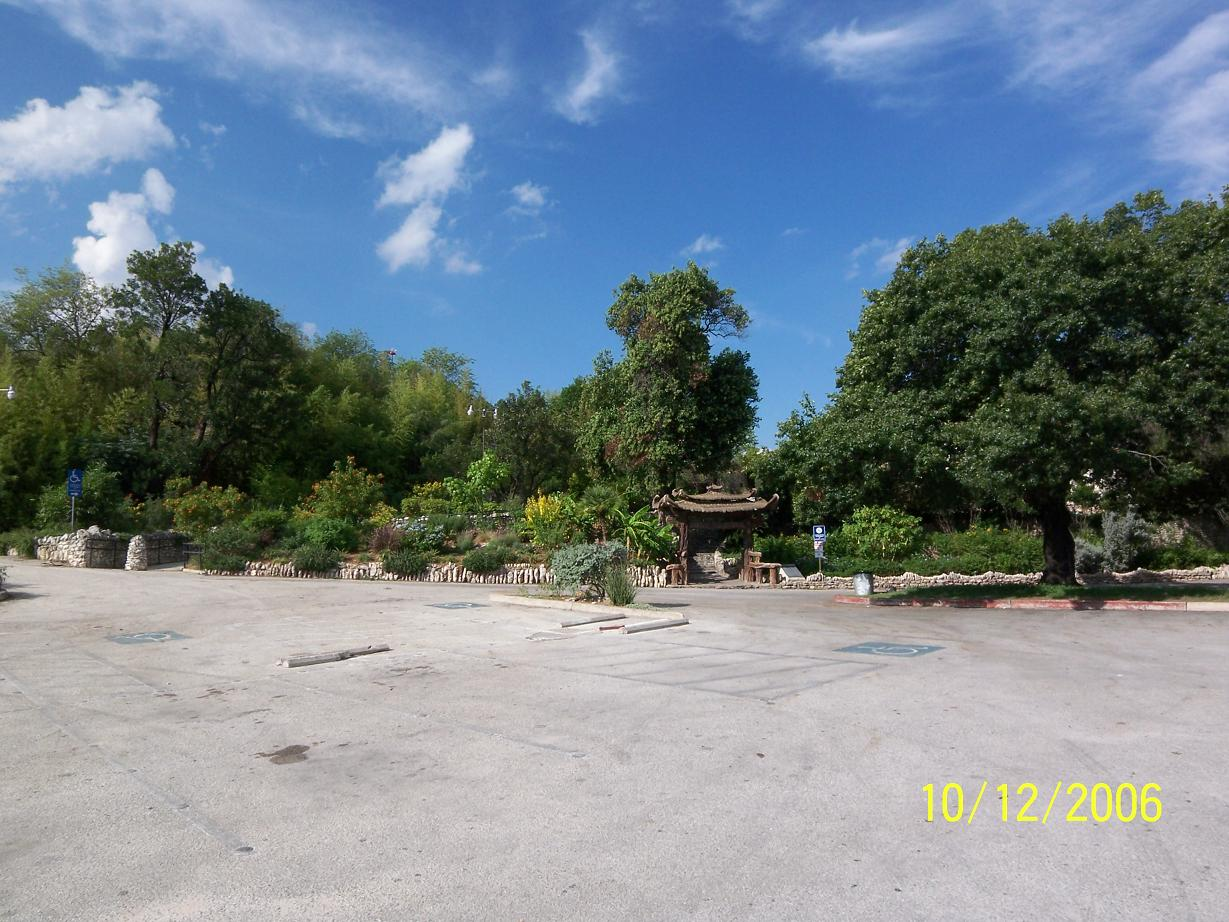
View from parking lot to garden entrance

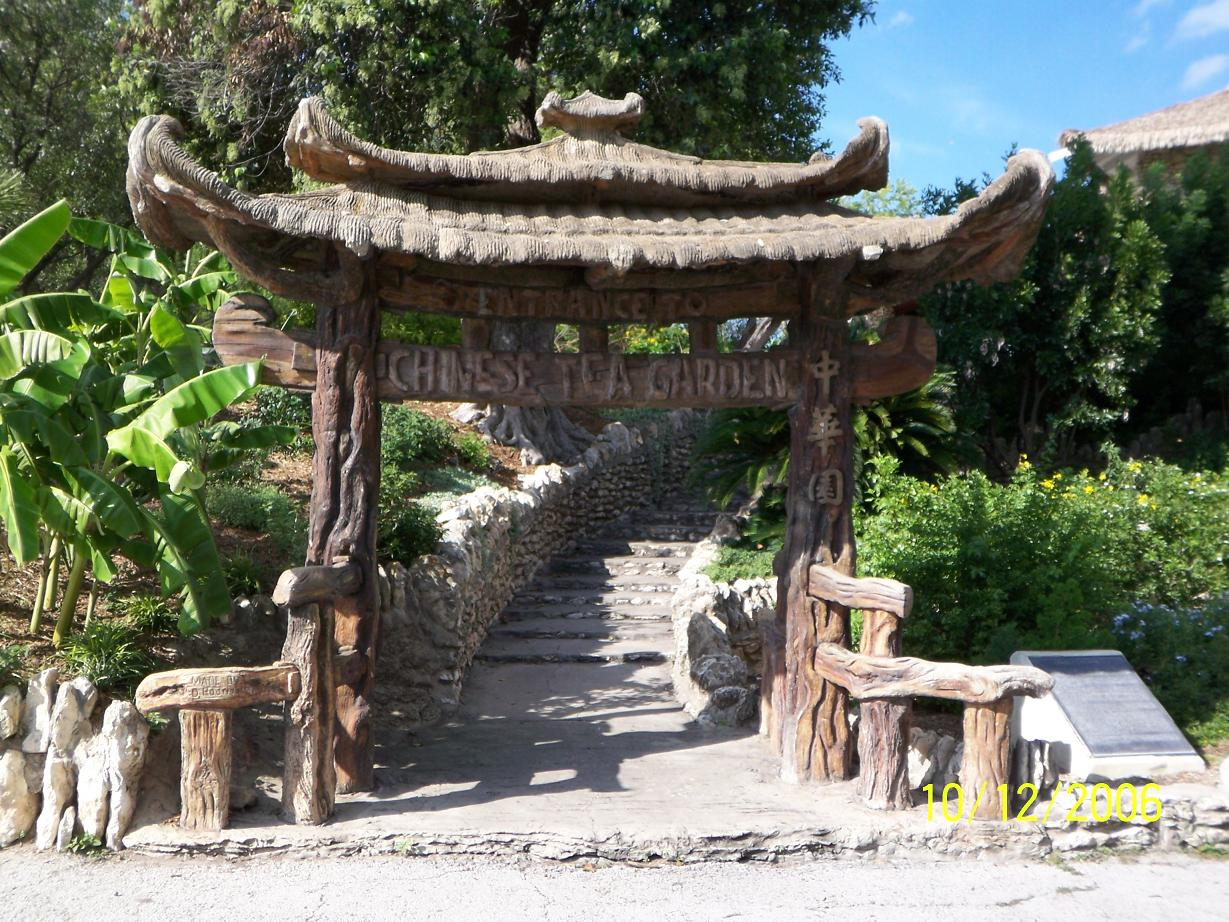
Tea Garden entrance

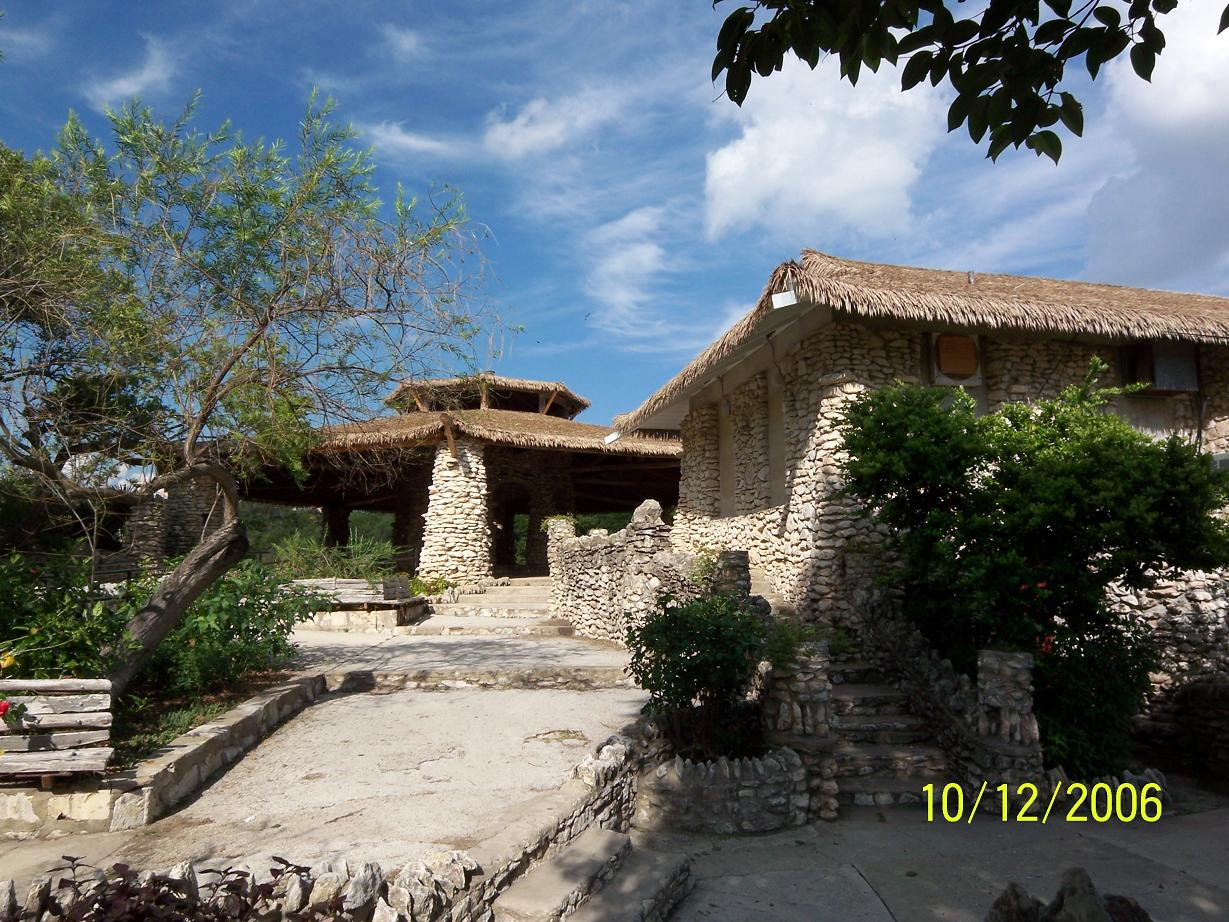
Pagoda and Jingu House

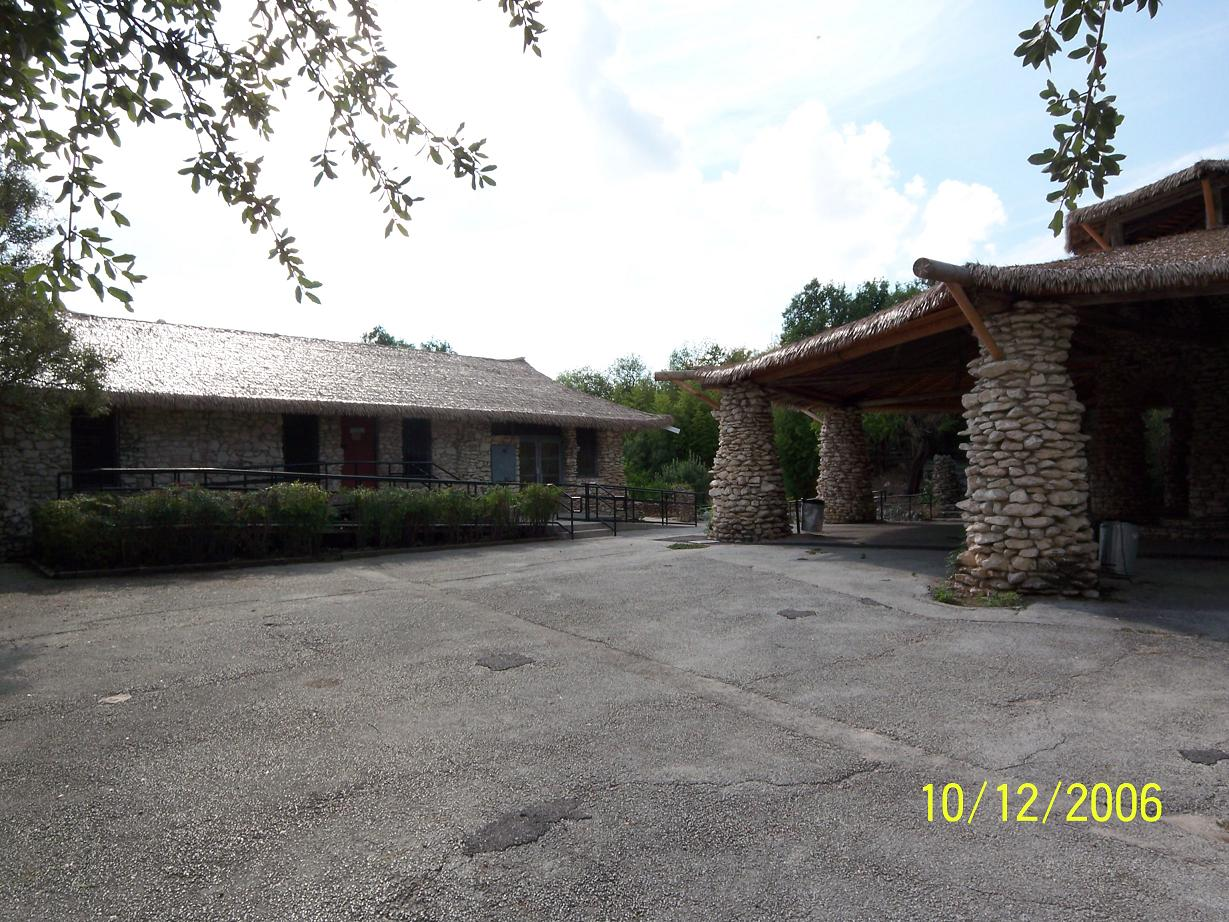
Pagoda and Jingu House

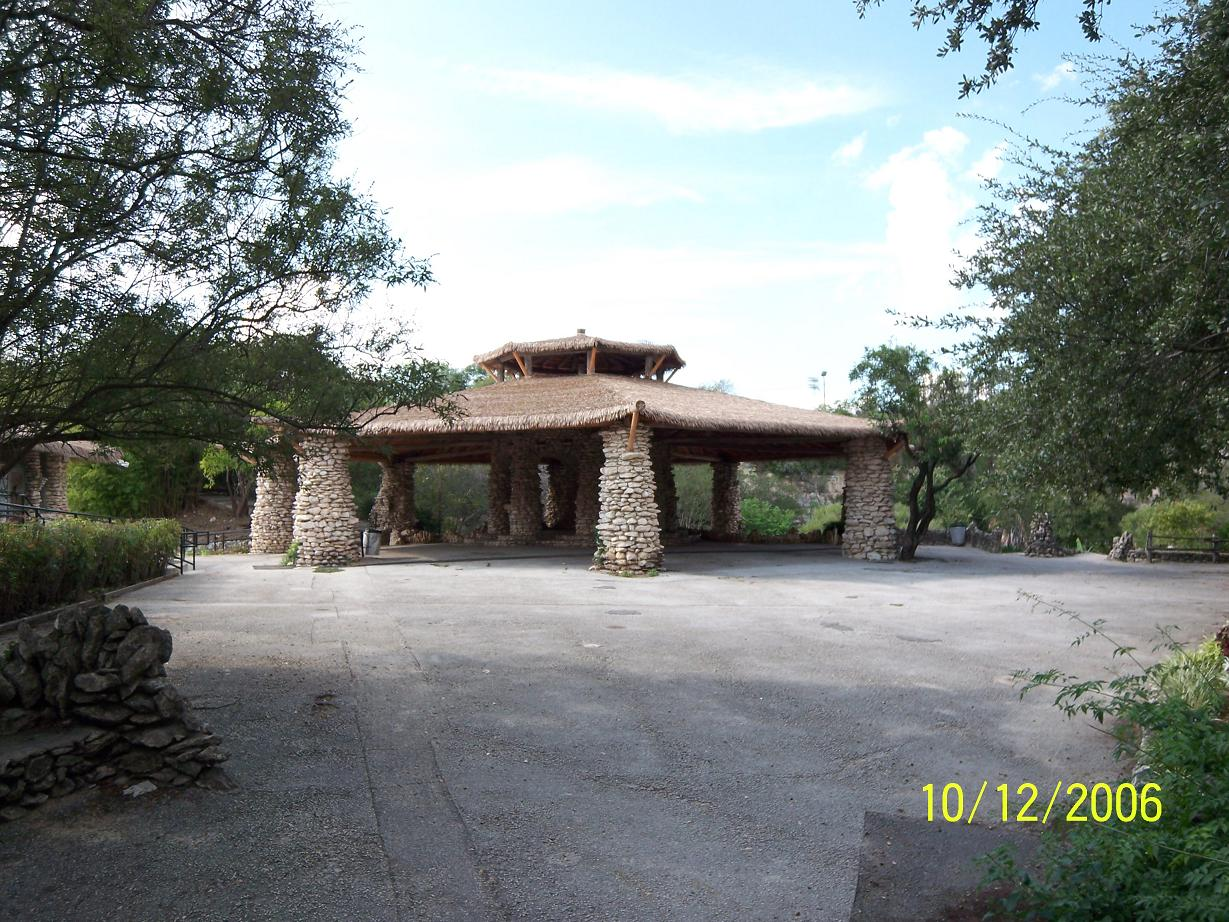
Pagoda

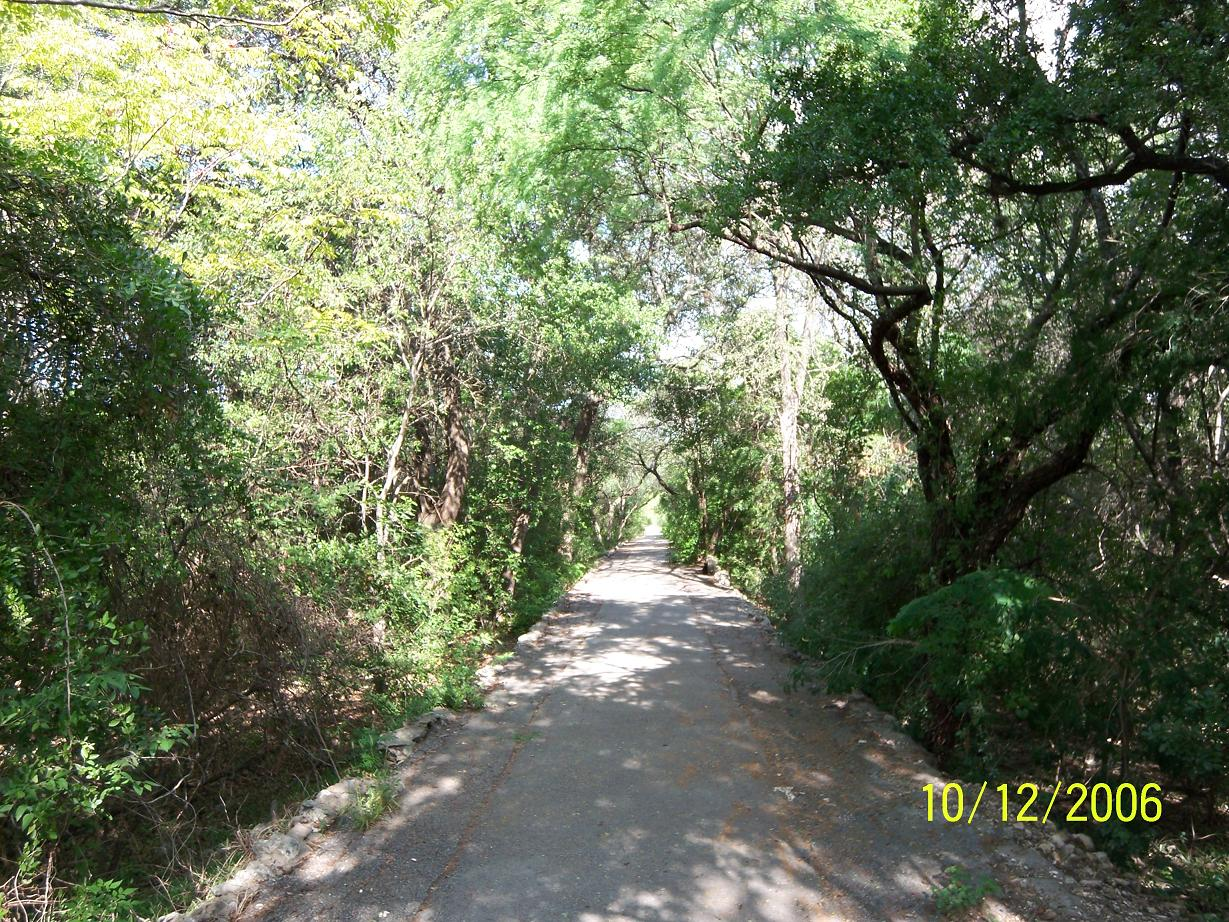
Walkway toward City Zoo – during quarry operations, it was used as a cart path.

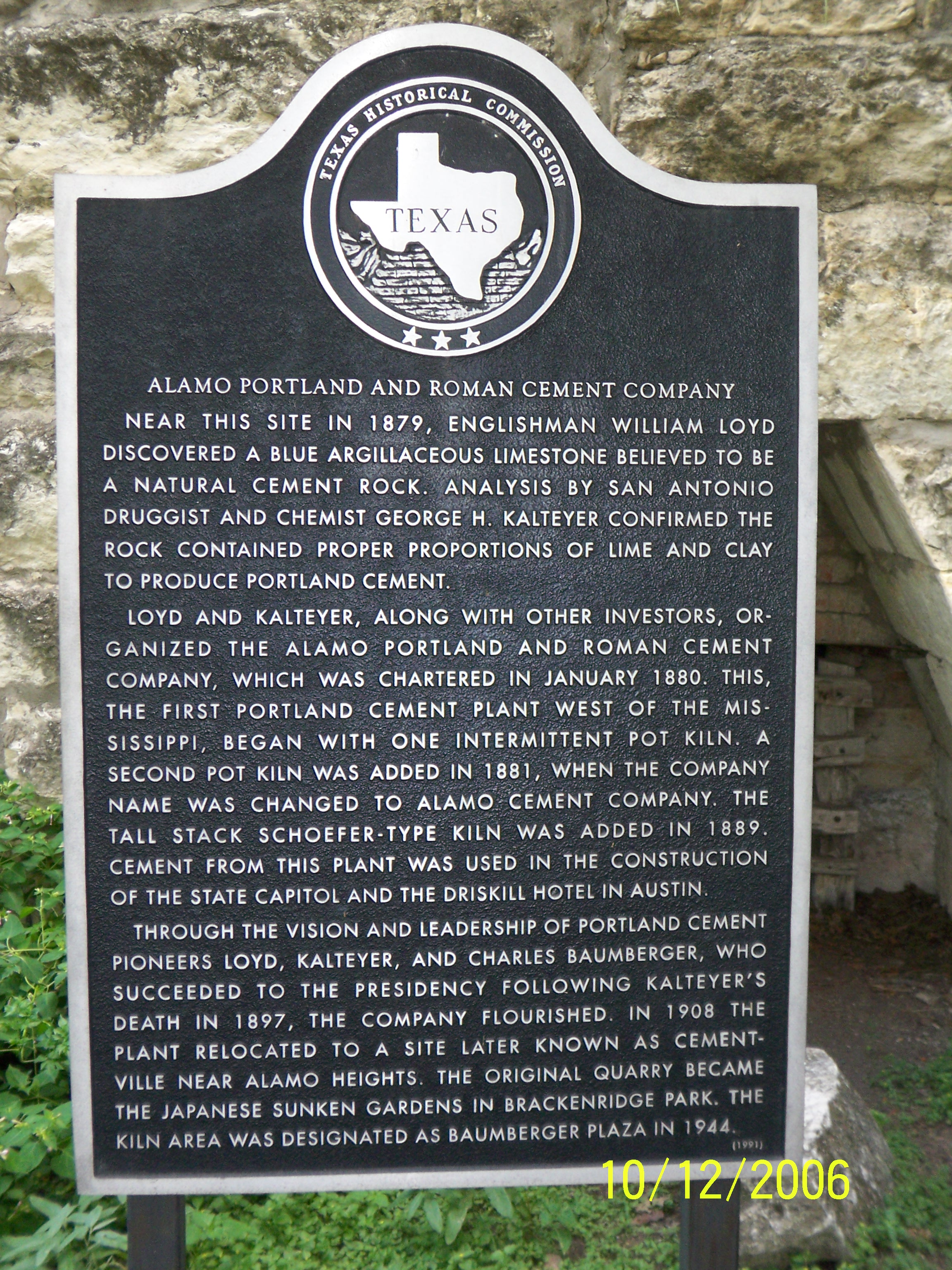
Historical sign in front of kiln

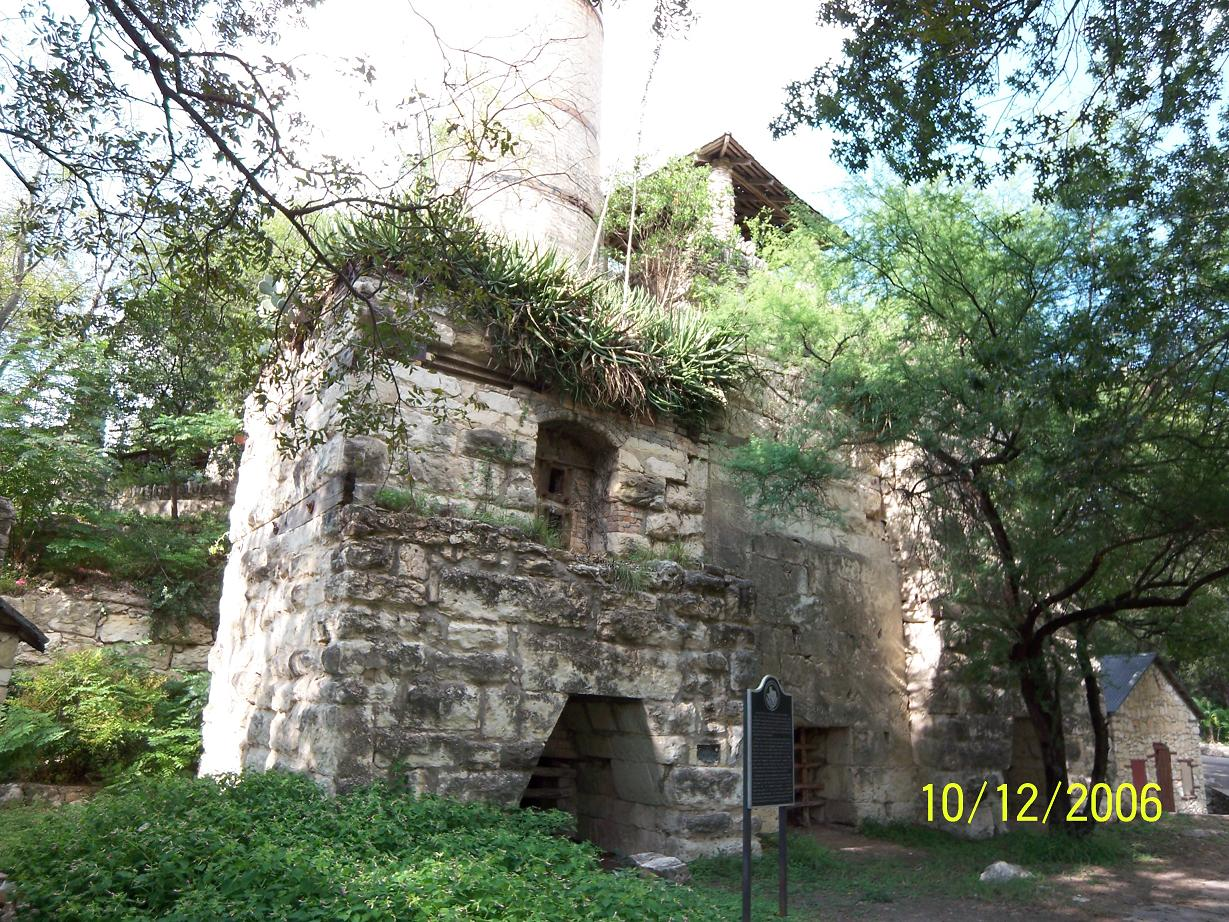
Cement kiln

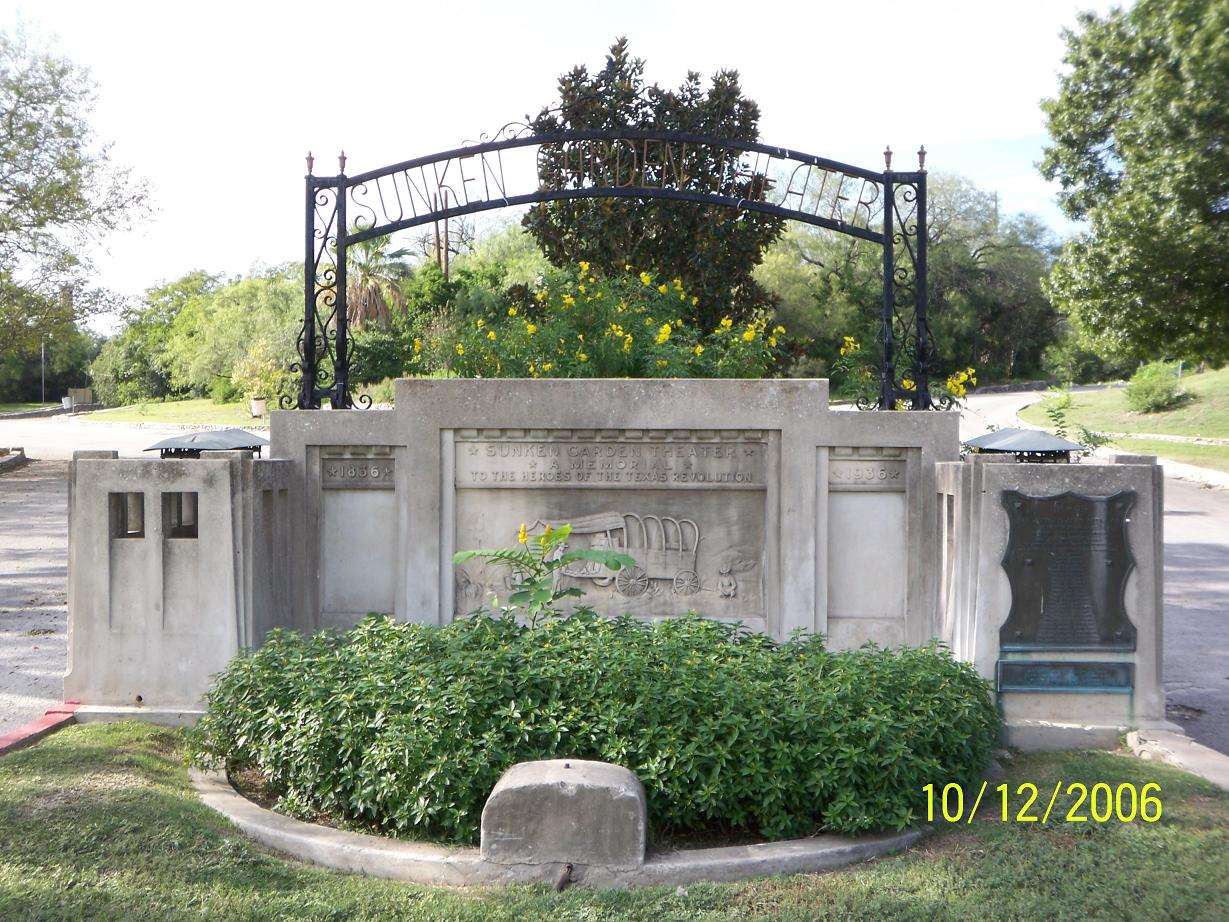
Sunken Garden Theater 1930 entrance marquee

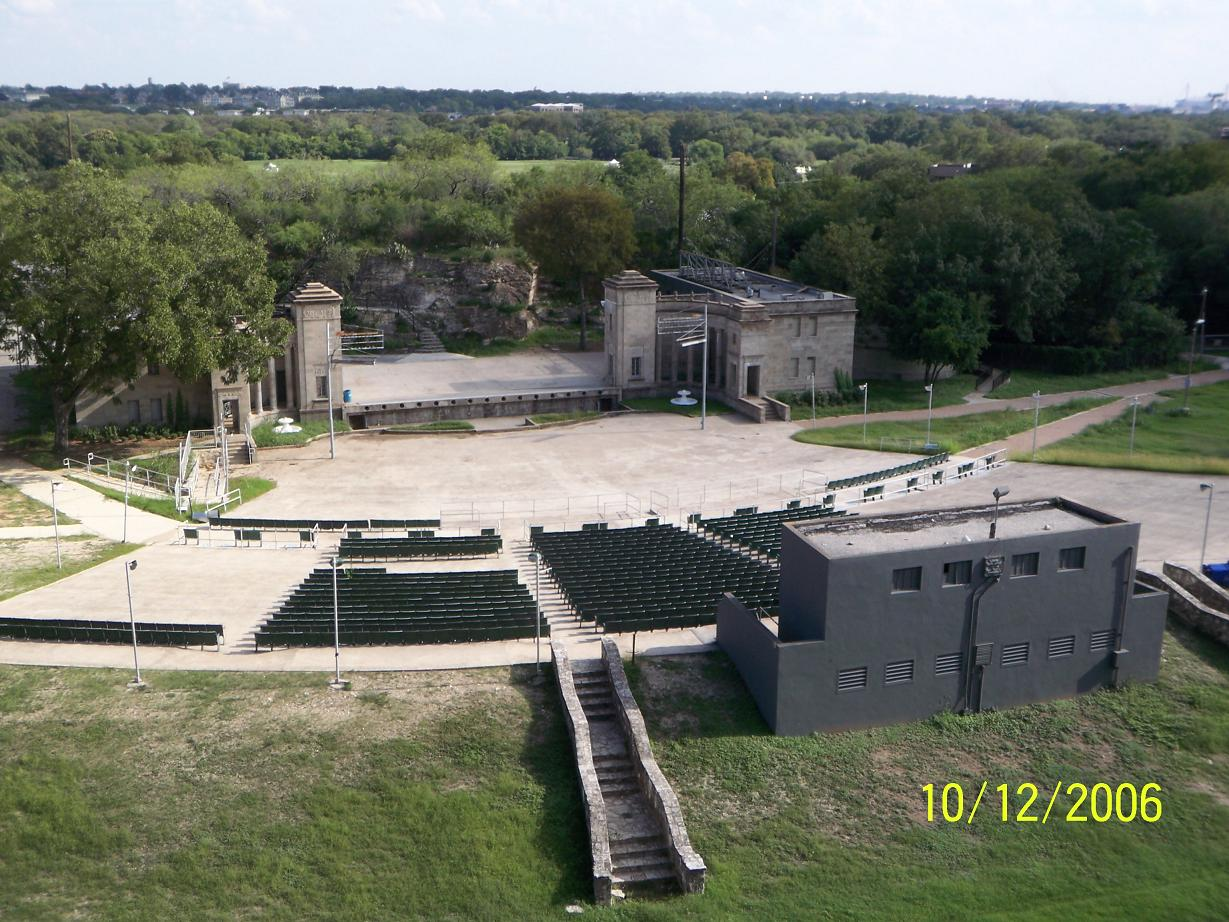
Sunken Garden Amphitheater

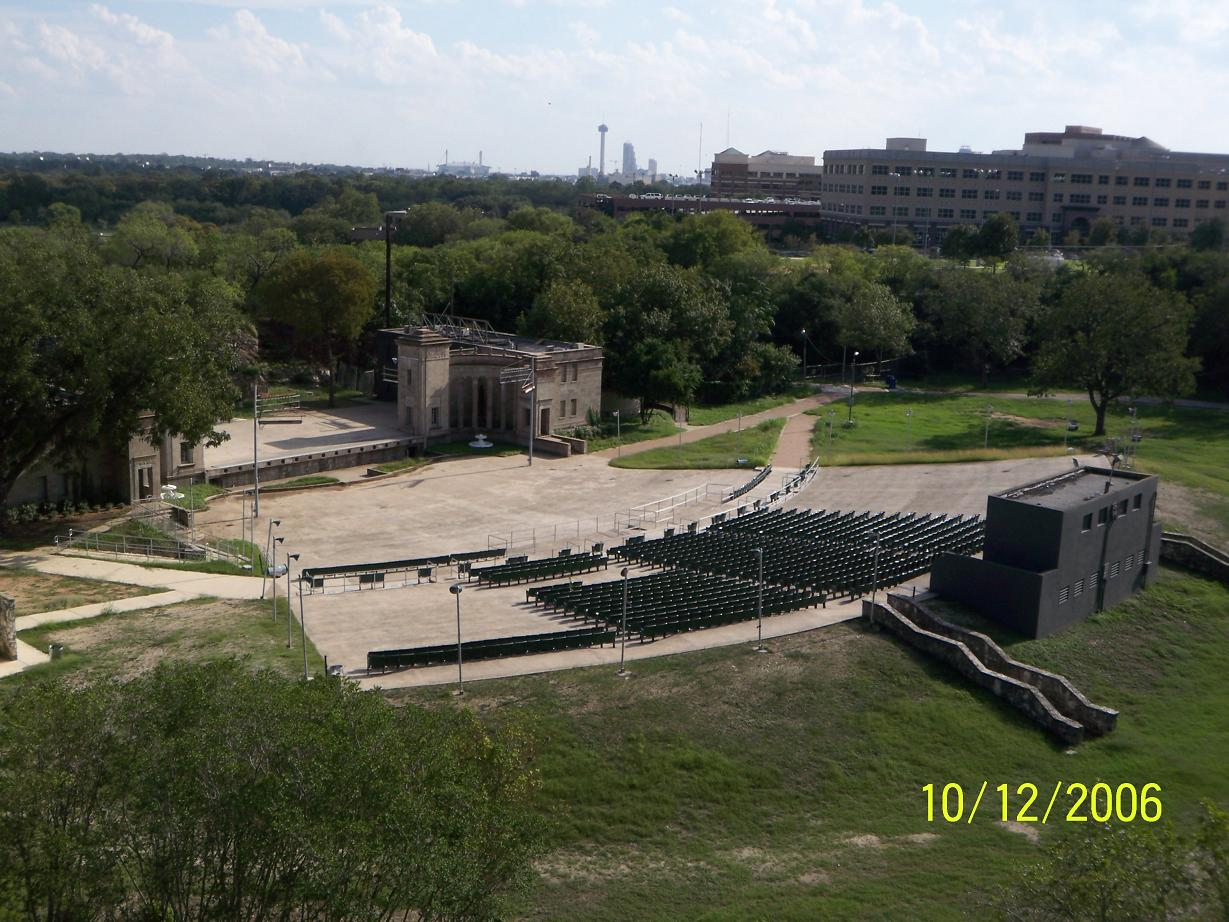
Sunken Garden Amphitheater

== See also ==
- Japanese garden
- Japanese culture
