= Woman's Club of San Antonio =

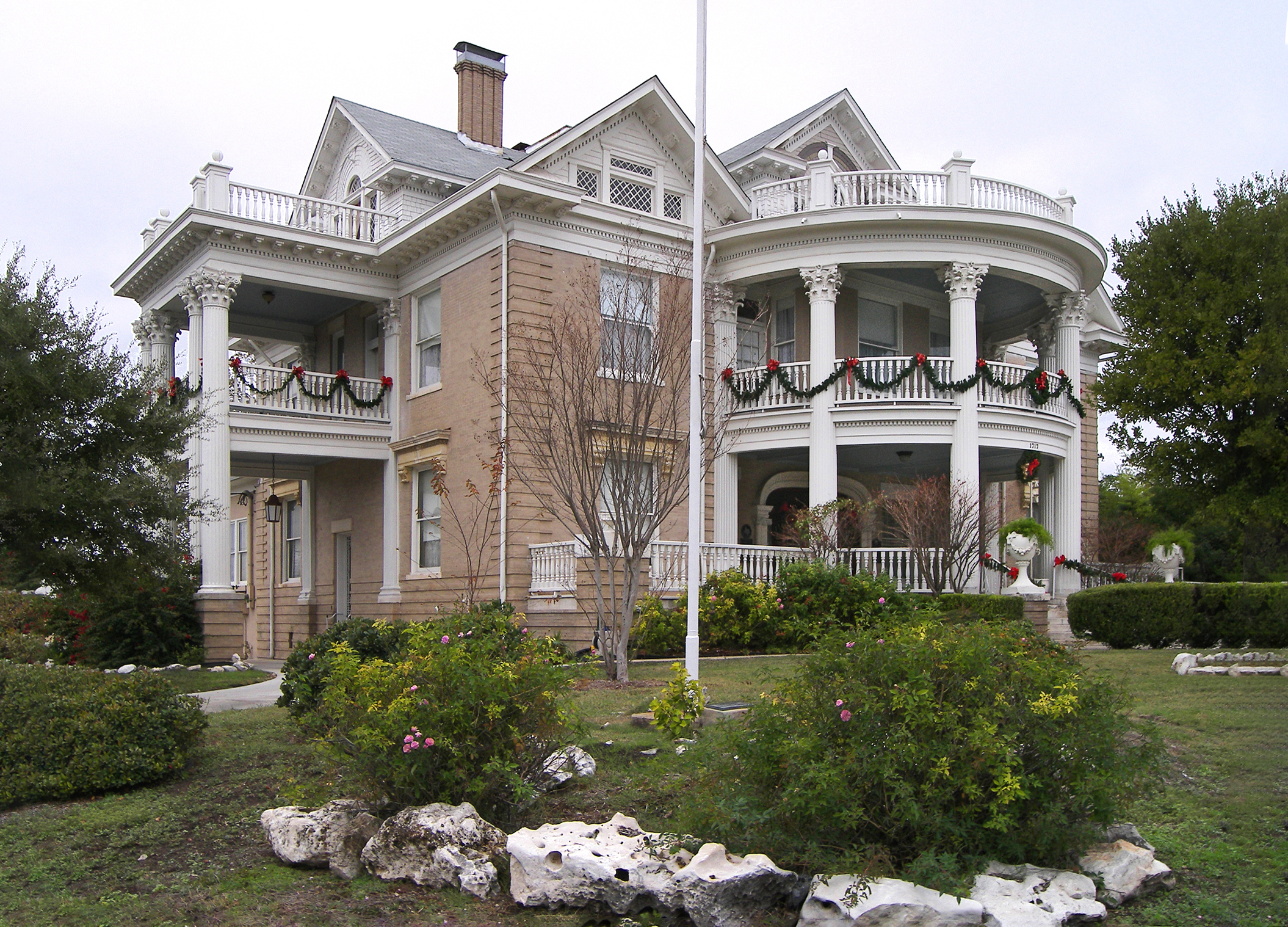
- Woodward House headquarters
- Formation: October 1, 1898; 127 years ago
- Headquarters: San Antonio, Texas
- Coordinates: 29.450079°N 98.499395°W
- Website: The Woman's Club of San Antonio

The Woman's Club of San Antonio is a philanthropic civic organization located in Bexar County in the U.S. state of Texas. It was founded October 1, 1898 by Mary Eleanor Brackenridge, Marin B. Fenwick and sixteen other individuals who had been inspired by the National Federation of Women's Clubs. Brackenridge served as the organization's first president. The sororal organization is the oldest civic organization in San Antonio. They partner with businesses, local government and other civic organizations to promote health, safety, welfare and education. One of its original goals was to bring the Nineteenth Amendment to the United States Constitution to fruition, and was the first Texas woman's club to promote the issue.

In 1905, the club established the Isabella H. Brackenridge Scholarship for students at University of Texas Medical Branch. Since its inception, the club has been active in supporting education through scholarships and through political lobbying activities for educational reforms. They hold numerous fund raisers to promote San Antonio charities. The organization is active in community arts and cultural programs. They join other civic organizations to partner with the city in the annual Fiesta San Antonio.

The organization is headquartered in the David J. and May Bock Woodward House at 1717 San Pedro Avenue, in the Alta Vista district of San Antonio. The furnished house was purchased in 1926 for $47,000. In keeping with the stipulations of the sale, the Woman's Club of San Antonio maintained a home-like setting and made changes only to accommodate areas for meetings and storage. The house was designated a Recorded Texas Historic Landmark in 1994. It was placed on the National Register of Historic Places listings in Bexar County, Texas on February 16, 1996.
