= Mahncke Park, San Antonio =

Neighborhood of San Antonio, Texas

Coordinates: 29°27′29″N 98°27′52″W

Mahncke Park is an urban neighborhood and park located on the eastern fringe of Midtown San Antonio, Texas. The park connects the San Antonio Botanical Gardens to Brackenridge Park. The surrounding neighborhood was built around Mahncke Park.

The park is a long, narrow strip of natural greenspace laid out on an east–west axis between Parland and Funston Streets. The east end is bounded by N. New Braunfels and the Botanical Gardens and the west end is bounded by Broadway and Brackenridge Park.

The Midtown San Antonio neighborhood is within walking distance of: Fort Sam Houston, San Antonio Botanical Gardens, DoSeum Children's Museum, Japanese Tea Garden, San Antonio Zoo, Brackenridge Park, the Witte Museum, Lions Field Park and the Brackenridge Golf Course. By car, the neighborhood is 5–10 minutes from Pearl Brewery, Downtown, Alamo Heights, and major freeways.

Most of the homes in the neighborhood range in size from 1,000 sq ft (100 m^{2}) to 2,000 sq ft (200 m^{2}) and were constructed during the 1920s through the 1950s. Pre-World War II housing architecture consists primarily of bungalows built in styles of Mission, Four Square, California and Cottage Tudor. Post-World War II housing architecture consists mainly of Ranch-style dwellings. The neighborhood today has an eclectic mix of residents from all backgrounds and persuasions.

Located just north of Downtown San Antonio, the neighborhood's boundaries are:

== See also ==
- Neighborhoods and districts of San Antonio
