= David J. and May Bock Woodward House =

Historic house in Texas, US

- U.S. National Register of Historic Places
- Recorded Texas Historic Landmark
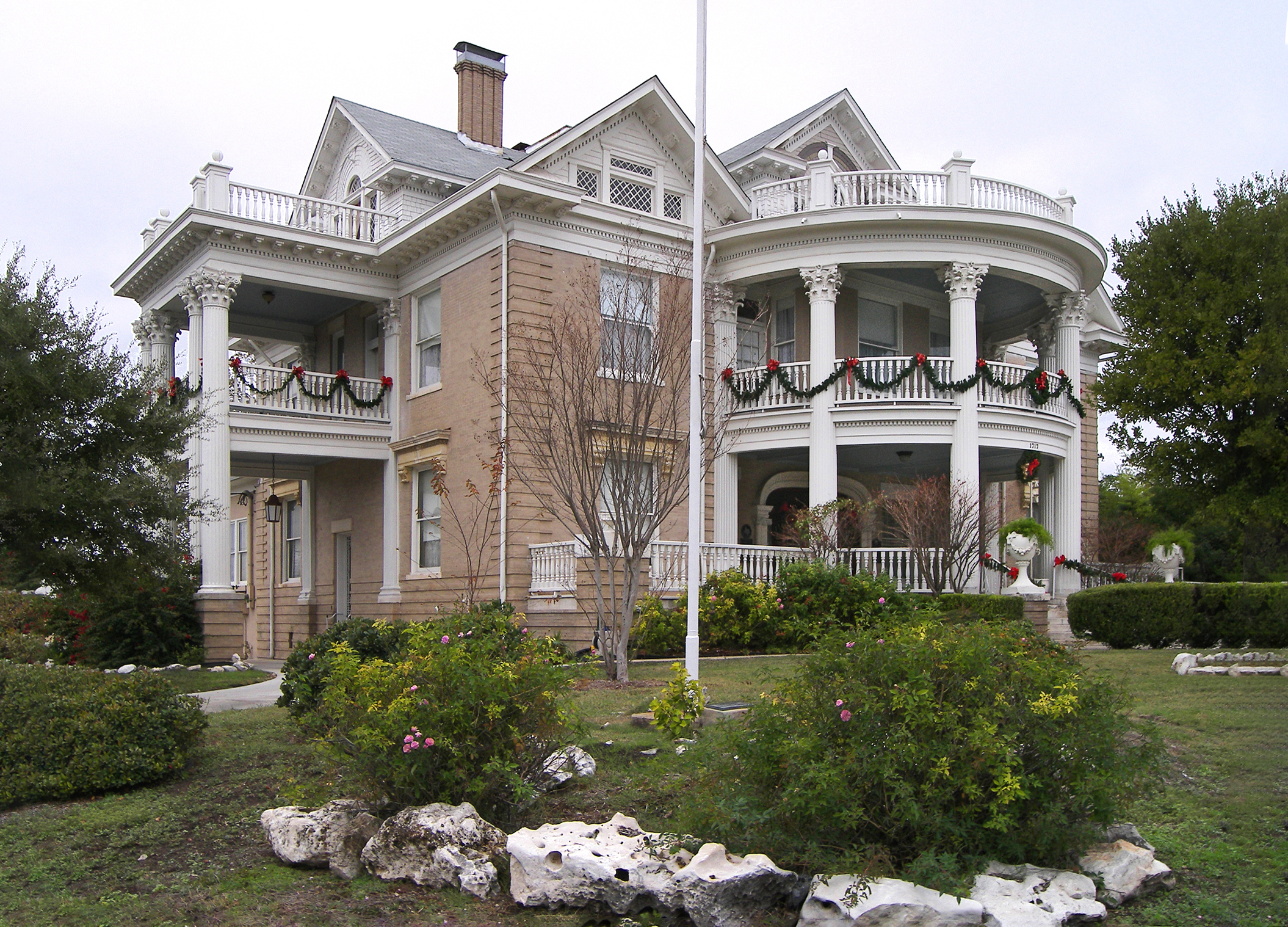
- Woodward House

- Location within Texas Location within the United States
- Location: 1717 San Pedro Avenue. Bexar County, Texas
- Coordinates: 29°27′01″N 98°29′59″W
- Architect: Atlee Ayres
- Architectural style: Classic revival
- NRHP reference No.: 96000069
- RTHL No.: 13398

Significant dates
- Added to NRHP: February 16, 1996
- Designated RTHL: 1994

The David J. and May Bock Woodward House is a historic house in the Alta Vista district of the Bexar County city of San Antonio in the U.S. state of Texas. It was designated a Recorded Texas Historic Landmark in 1994. It was placed on the National Register of Historic Places listings in Bexar County, Texas on February 16, 1996.

This 2 1/2-story Classic revival home was designed 1904–1905 by architect Atlee Ayres for businessman David J. Woodward (1864–1925) and his wife May Bock Woodward (1866–1942). The couple flipped twenty-three homes during their married life. David built the houses, and May decorated them. Each property would eventually be sold for profit when the couple moved upward to a more expensive residence. After David Woodward died, his wife sold the house at 1717 San Pedro in 1926 to the Woman's Club of San Antonio for $47,000. It is currently being used as the organization's clubhouse. The first floor of the house are the interior parlor, library with fireplace, butler's pantry, office, kitchen, powder room and dining room. When Ayres designed the house, the second floor served as living quarters with five bedrooms, bath and sitting room. Alterations made by the club converted three of the bedrooms into a single meeting room. The Woodwards intended the top floor to be a ballroom and had it designed with window box seats. Currently, it serves as storage space.
