= Brackenridge Park =

Public park in Texas, USA

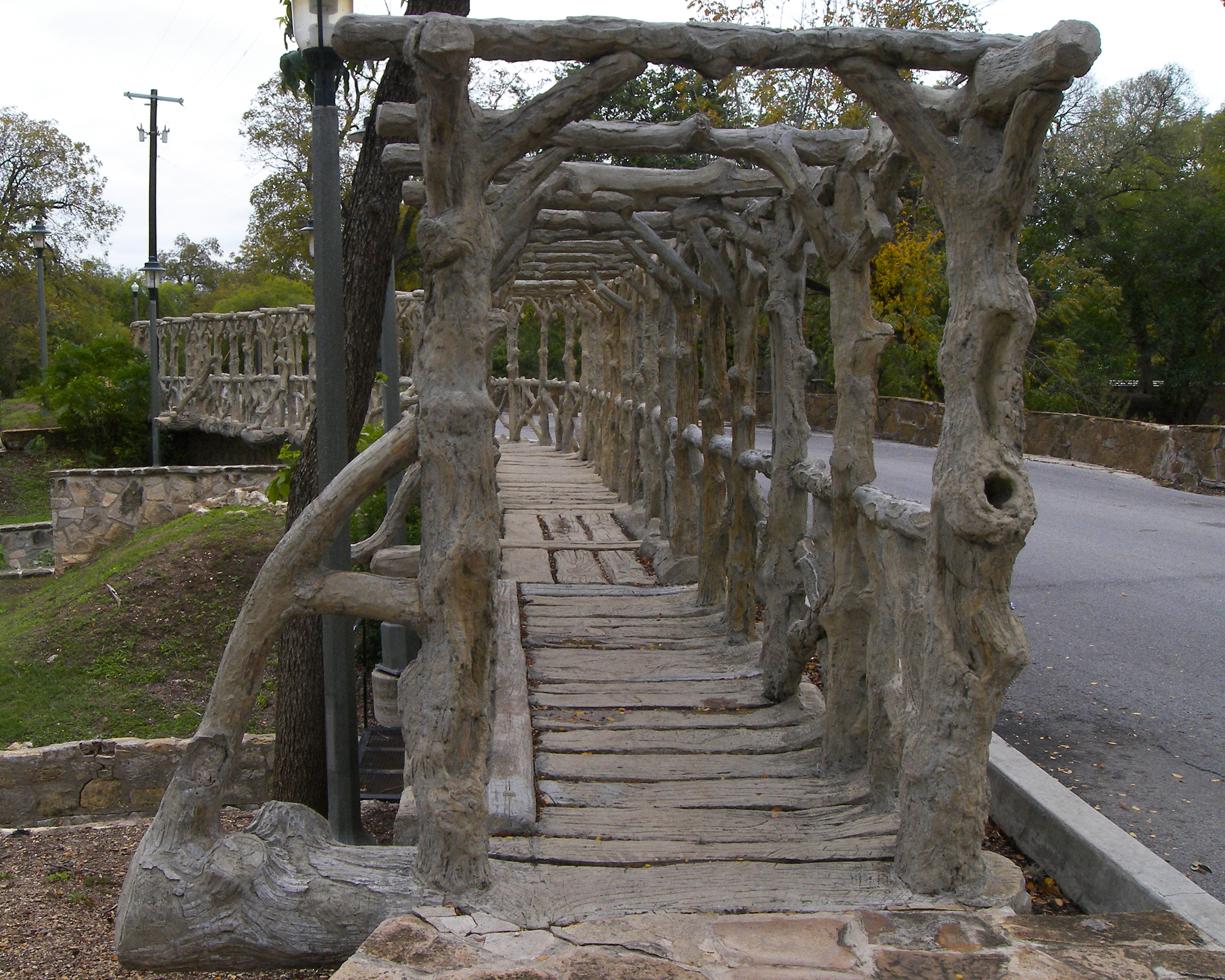
- Dionicio Rodriguez Bridge in Brackenridge Park
- Interactive map of Brackenridge Park
- Type: public park
- Location: 3700 N. St. Mary's Street; San Antonio, Texas 78209
- Coordinates: 29.4557876°N 98.473072°W
- Area: 343.7 acres (1.391 km^{2})
- Created: 1899
- Operator: San Antonio Parks and Recreation Department
- Brackenridge Park
- U.S. National Register of Historic Places
- U.S. Historic district
- NRHP reference No.: 11000513
- Added to NRHP: August 4, 2011

Brackenridge Park is a 343.7-acre public park (139.1 ha) in San Antonio, Texas, United States, on the city's Broadway Corridor just north of downtown San Antonio.

Brackenridge Park also refers to the district of the city where the park is located.

== History ==
It was created in 1899 from land donated to the city by George Washington Brackenridge.

== Recreation and features ==
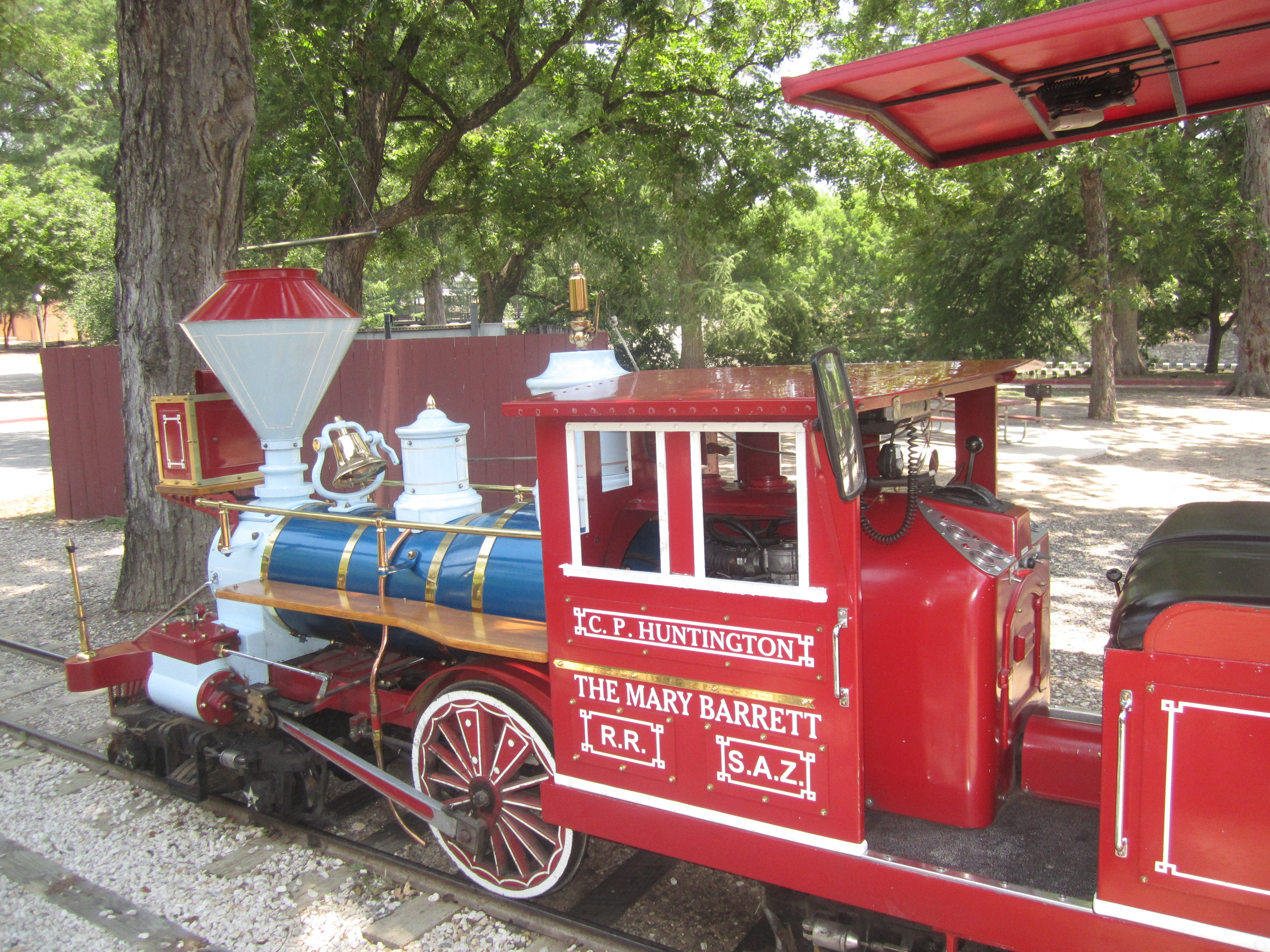
The San Antonio Zoo Eagle train carries visitors throughout Brackenridge Park.

Attractions within the park include the San Antonio Zoo, the Witte Museum, the Japanese Tea Gardens, the Sunken Garden Theater, the Tuesday Musical Club, First Tee of San Antonio and the 2 ft (610 mm) narrow gauge San Antonio Zoo Eagle train ride, which first opened in 1956. Other nearby attractions include the DoSeum and the San Antonio Botanical Garden.

Inside the park, there are multiple baseball fields, playgrounds, pavilions, and walking trails.

== See also ==
- Acequia Madre de Valero (San Antonio)
- Dionicio Rodriguez
- San Antonio Japanese Tea Garden
- Fountain at Alamo Cement Company
- Fence at Alamo Cement Company
- Brackenridge Park Golf Course
- Brackenridge Park Bridge
