= Houston Zoo =

Zoo in Houston, Texas, US

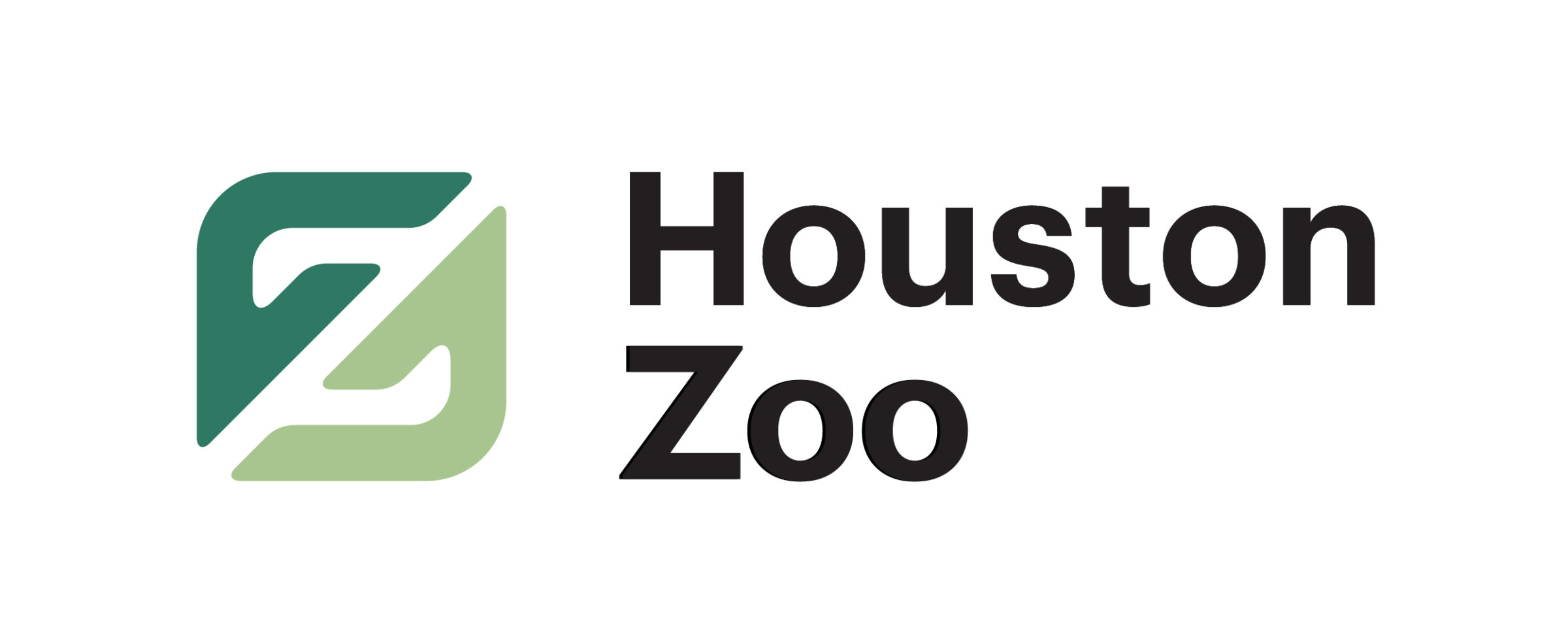

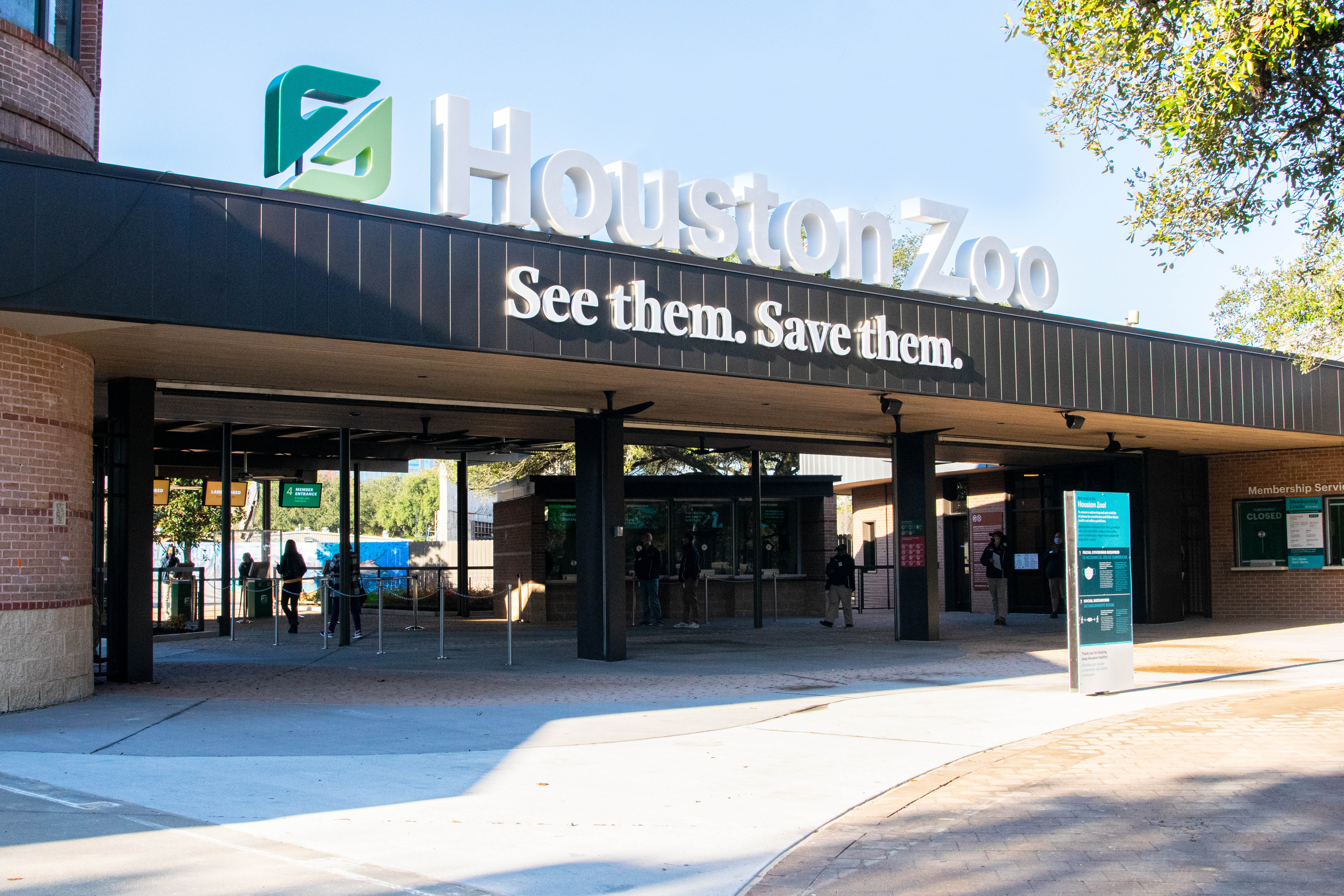
- Houston Zoo entrance
- Interactive map of Houston Zoo
- 29°42′58.074″N 95°23′26.05″W
- Slogan: See them. Save them.
- Date opened: September 1922
- Location: Houston, Texas, United States
- Land area: 55 acres (22 ha)
- No. of animals: 4300+
- No. of species: 575
- Annual visitors: 2 million
- Owner: Houston Zoo Inc.
- Website: www.houstonzoo.org

The Houston Zoo (also known historically as the Hermann Park Zoo and the Houston Zoological Gardens) is a 55-acre (22 ha) zoological park located within Hermann Park in Houston, Texas, United States. The zoo opened in 1922 as a park attraction housing 40 animals. In 2026 it housed around 4300 animals, and as of 2024 the collections included representatives of 575 species. The zoo had 2 million visitors in 2024.

The Houston Zoo participates in ongoing efforts to protect the endangered Attwater's prairie chicken and Houston toad, as well as supporting conservation organizations locally and globally. In 2026 this work included 52 conservation projects across 17 countries. In 2009 the zoo partnered with the Baylor College of Medicine to develop a vaccine for elephant endotheliotropic herpesvirus (EEHV), a disease affecting Asian elephants, which became available for use in captive populations in 2024.

The zoo has been managed and operated by the non-profit Houston Zoo Inc. since 2002. It was previously part of the city parks department. It is a member of the World Association of Zoos and Aquariums (WAZA), and is accredited by the Association of Zoos and Aquariums (AZA).

== History ==
=== Early zoo and establishment in Hermann Park ===
Houston's first zoo opened in 1901 in the city's downtown Sam Houston Park. Its animals, most of which were given to the zoo by individuals or civic groups, included a range of mostly American wildlife including black bears, prairie dogs, monkeys, opossums and eagles, as well as domestic species such as guinea pigs, goldfish and goats. The zoo closed abruptly in 1906 when the city's park commissioner sold the collection to another exhibitor and had the animals packed and shipped before notifying the public. He later cited the cost of maintaining the animals as his reason for closing the zoo. For the next fifteen years Houston had no public zoo.

Development of the current Houston Zoo began in 1921 when the federal government gave a bison from the federal herd at the Wichita Forest Reserve (Now the Wichita Mountains Wildlife Refuge) to the city of Houston. The bison, named Earl, arrived in March 1921 and was placed at then-new Hermann Park. The parks department purchased a female bison as a companion for Earl, began to build animal cages in the park, and called for help from the community in providing additional animals and raising funds to purchase more expensive specimens like "an elephant, zebra, camels, elks, lions, and other larger animals." Park superintendent Clarence Brock hired Hans Nagel, who had previously worked in Germany as a wild animal hunter and handler for Carl Hagenbeck, as assistant zookeeper.

The zoo officially opened on April 30, 1922. In 1923 Nagel was promoted to head keeper, a post he held until his death in 1941. By 1925 the zoo facility had been finalized as a 34-acre fenced area within the park, and its animal collection included 300 birds, 100 reptiles, and 400 other animals.

==== Zoo design and early development ====
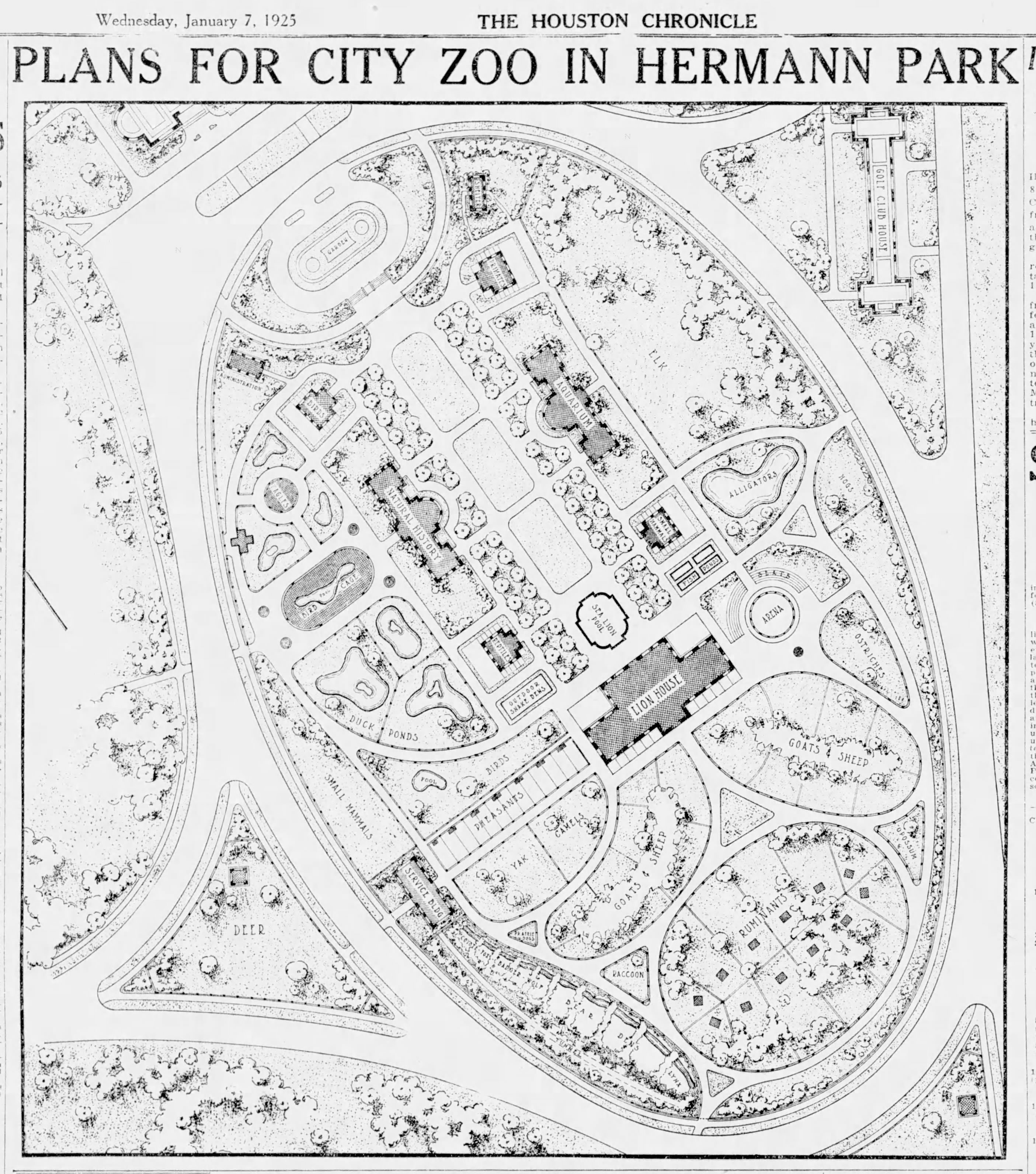
Hare & Hare's original plan for the Houston Zoo.

In 1923 the Houston Board of Park Commissioners and Planning Commission hired landscape architects Hare & Hare to design the zoo grounds. Their design established the zoo's general shape and orientation as an oval divided at the north end by a series of three reflection pools (combined into a single pool in the 1950s) that formed an axis with the larger reflection pool near the main entrance to Hermann Park. The zoo entrance was placed at the north end of the oval facing into the park.

Hare & Hare's design provided guidance for exhibit placement as the zoo was built out. The city implemented some elements of the plan, including a sea lion pool opposite the entrance at the end of the reflection pool, a free-flight aviary, a performance arena for big cat shows, and space for the city's natural history museum, which was located on the zoo grounds from 1927 to 1969. Others were never built, including the proposed aquarium and the set of barless enclosures--a popular zoo design in the early twentieth century, separating animals from visitors with moats and artificial cliffs rather than cages--proposed for housing bears, canids, badgers and lynx.

The Houston-born writer David Westheimer later recalled that when he was a child in the 1920s, "nearly all of the animals in the Hermann Park Zoo were in iron-barred cages, and not very big ones. The elephants, Hans (named after zookeeper Hans Nagel) and Nellie, were in a stockade, and I think the giraffes were too. The four-footed grazing-type creatures were merely fenced in, and nothing had been done to make their domain resemble anything but an undersized and overcropped pasture."

==== Access ====
Under Houston's Jim Crow laws, African Americans were allowed to visit the zoo, although the municipal code segregating the park system otherwise designated Hermann Park for whites. Facilities such as water fountains and restrooms within the zoo were segregated into the 1950s.

Entry to the zoo was free, and with the exception of a two-year period during the Great Depression, it remained free until the beginning of 1989.

=== Early years, 1920s-40s ===
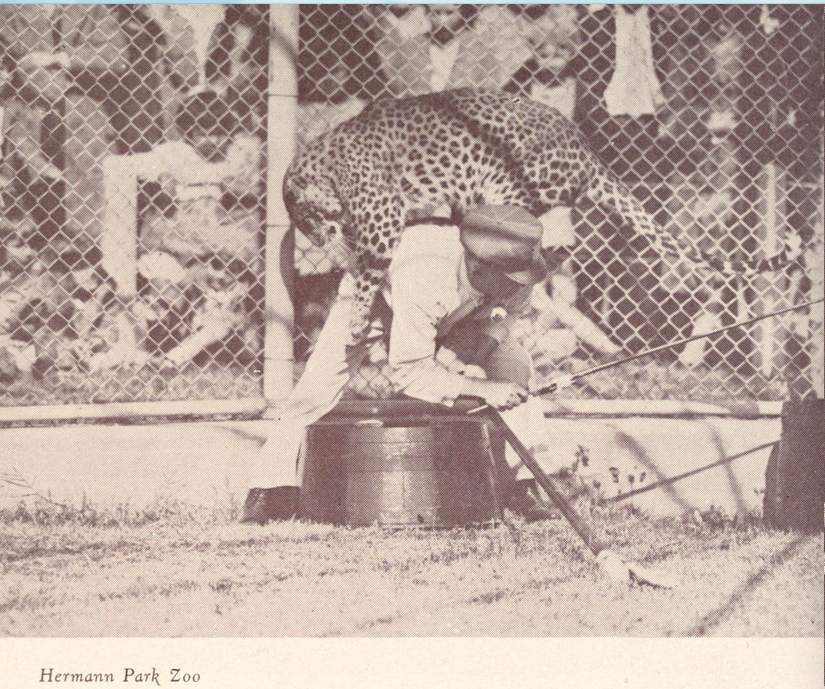
Head zookeeper Hans Nagel performs with a leopard in the Houston Zoo's big cat arena.

From its opening in 1922 through the end of World War II the zoo was a recreation and entertainment amenity for the city, which was a common approach to zoo management at this time. In 1925, park superintendent Brock explained to the Houston Chronicle that a zoo could be planned either as a scientific exhibit or as a menagerie, and "ours will lay stress on the menagerie idea. We will have trained animals to perform as well as specimens for folks to look at, and we'll select our specimens for their popular interests first and their naturalistic interest second." Head keeper Nagel gave regular circus-style performances with the zoo's big cats in the arena built for that purpose. There were also demonstrations of alligator wrestling and performing chimpanzees, and at times staff allowed visitors to handle baby animals. In the early 1940s the zoo was nationally known for its collection of albino specimens of common Texas wildlife, which included a bobcat, a vulture, a flying squirrel, an opossum, and a pair of raccoons.

After the initial investment, the zoo's budget from the city did not include funds for purchasing new animals. It relied instead on a combination of donations, fund-raising campaigns for big-ticket purchases like elephants, captive breeding, and trading of specimens with other zoos. Brock and Nagel also undertook collecting expeditions to capture new animals for the zoo.

In 1928 the zoo became part of the first American effort to protect a threatened species, other than a mammal or a bird, when it received a group of Galapagos tortoises from the New York Aquarium. The Aquarium collected the tortoises in the Galapagos Islands and was distributing them to other zoos in an effort to protect the species through establishment of a captive population and breeding program. Three of these animals still live at the zoo as part of the tortoise herd in the Galapagos Islands exhibit.

==== Depression-era deterioration ====
While some of the original buildings, including the monkey house and the free-flight aviary, were designed to be permanent, many of the original structures were made of recycled materials. The first big cat arena, later replaced by a permanent facility, was made of old bars from the city jail, and other buildings including the big cat house, chimpanzee house, and restrooms were repurposed from the World War I-era Camp Logan and were meant to be temporary.

The Great Depression severely restricted zoo funding. In 1932, after a reduction of $15,000 in its budget (calculated by MeasuringWorth as equivalent to at least $280,000 in 2024 dollars), an admission fee of 10¢ for adults and 5¢ for children was established, lasting into 1933. The charge was presented to the public as an alternative to raising money by selling off the animals. Without money for maintenance the makeshift buildings deteriorated, leading to animal escapes and other dangerous situations. In 1934 a 600-lb lion named Hermann fell through the rotted floor of his cage. This demonstration of the building's unfitness led the zoo to apply for a grant from the Works Progress Administration (WPA) for a new lion house, which opened in 1937. Other escapes included a grizzly bear that clawed its way out of a building weakened by dry rot and was shot, and a young chimpanzee that escaped by tearing out the rotted window frame in its building. In addition to these incidents, critics noted that the buildings weren't fireproof, adding risk for animals, keepers and visitors. The zoo did not receive funding from the city to correct these deficiencies or make other updates until after World War II.

=== Mid-twentieth century expansion ===
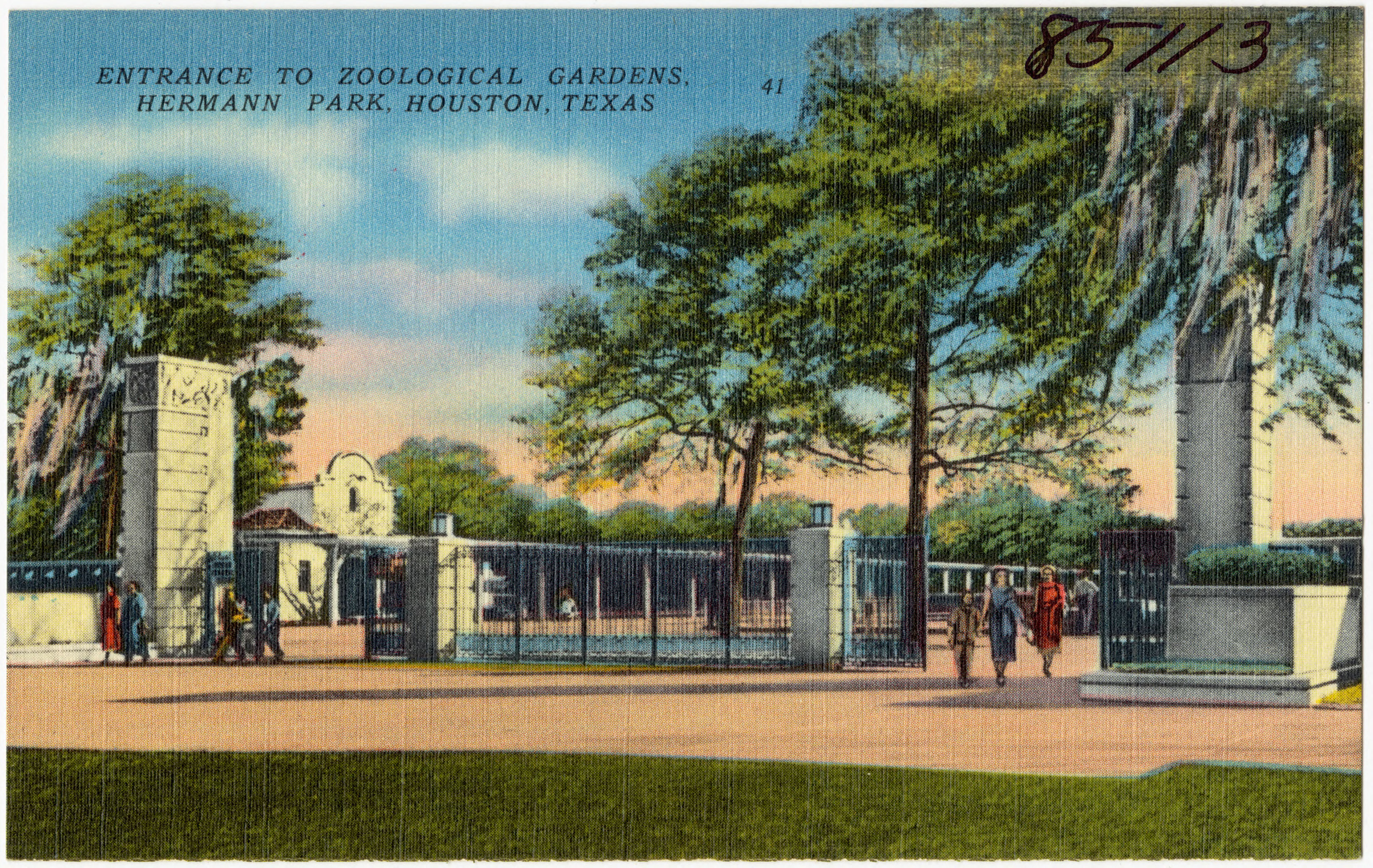
The entrance to the Houston Zoo in the mid-twentieth century.

In 1947 the city of Houston again hired Hare & Hare to develop an updated zoo design. In 1948, following a review of potential sites in other city parks, city leaders decided to keep the zoo in Hermann Park and expanded its footprint from 34 to 43 acres of parkland. The zoo added a series of new or updated exhibits, including a new primate house (1950), a new sea lion pool (1951) to replace the original pool demolished to build the primate house, an upgraded elephant barn and yard (1952), a new reptile house (1960) and a new small mammal house (1961). These buildings were in the "sanitary modernist" style that was common in mid-twentieth century zoo architecture. Made of concrete, tile and glass, they housed animals in "sleek, easy-to-clean concrete boxes." Zoo design soon began to swing away from this aesthetic, and the buildings completed later in the 1960s and in the 1970s, including a tropical bird house (1966) and a gorilla exhibit (1973) began to introduce plants and water features to evoke aspects of the animals' natural environments.

In 1956 the zoo hired its first professional staff, a veterinarian and a curator. John Werler, the curator, was a herpetologist and the former assistant director of San Antonio's Brackenridge Park Zoo. He became the zoo's first director in 1963, succeeding head keeper Tom Baylor who had been Hans Nagel's deputy and took over after Nagel's death. In 1957 Werler, who had established the first zoo collection of vampire bats in San Antonio, collected more bats in Mexico to establish a colony in Houston, which would become the first breeding zoo colony of vampire bats. They remained on display until 2008; the colony was rehomed because the slaughterhouses that had provided fresh blood for the bats had closed and the zoo was left without a reliable source of food for the colony.

In 1968 the first children's zoo opened, supported by bond funds for infrastructure and a $200,000 fundraising campaign for exhibits (calculated by MeasuringWorth as equivalent to at least $1.89 million in 2024 dollars). Designed for three- to six-year-old children, it included a harbor seal pool with underwater windows and an animal nursery with a viewing window. The petting zoo had four zones designed to evoke North America, Latin America, Asia and Africa.

In 1974 the zoo was accredited by the American Association of Zoological Parks and Aquariums (AAZPA), now the Association of Zoos and Aqauriums (AZA). It was one of the first institutions to receive accreditation after the AZA began its accreditation program.

==== Growth of community support ====
At the end of the 1960s support for the zoo was formalized through several new community organizations. In 1967 the Houston Zoological Society incorporated to serve as the zoo's official community and fund-raising support. In 1969 Zoo Friends, originally the Ladies' Guild of the Houston Zoological Society, became a second independent fundraising group to support the zoo. The money raised by these organizations enabled the zoo to purchase animals and build new exhibits, areas still not consistently covered by its city budget. In 1968 zoo volunteers organized into a Docent Council, which remained active until 2003. The docents, trained in natural history education and interpretation, gave tours and staffed the zoo's ZooMobile mobile education program.

=== Expanding propagation for conservation and display, 1960s-1980s ===
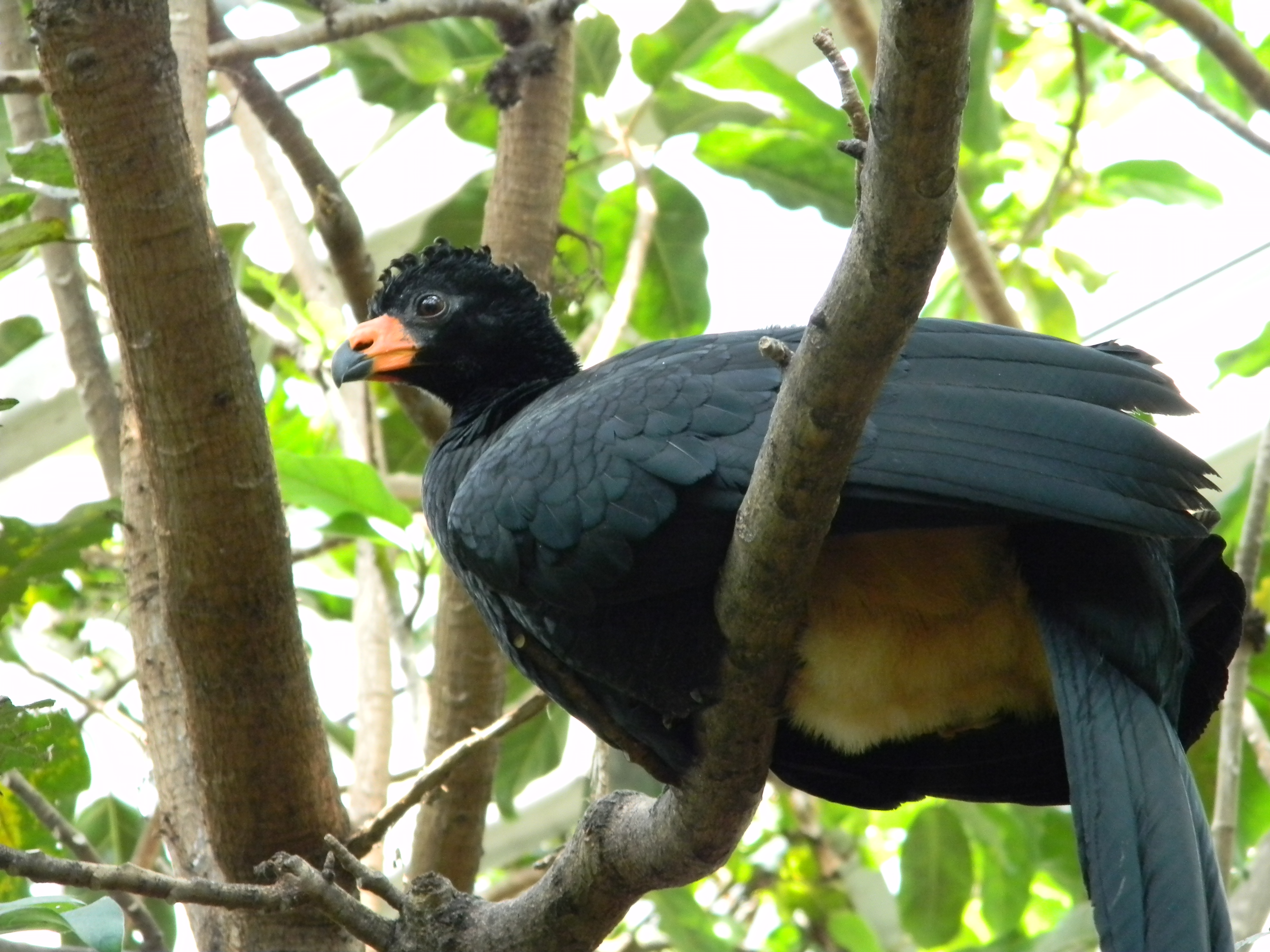
A female wattled curassow at the Houston Zoo, 2011

In the late 1960s and early 1970s the zoo began to undertake captive propagation specifically for conservation. Its early successes included work with breeding brown pelicans, which were then nearly extinct in North America, and curassows. In 1968 the zoo established a captive flock of very rare St. Vincent amazon parrots, and in 1972 hatched the first St. Vincent amazon to be born in captivity. Since then, the zoo has hatched three more chicks from this slow-to-breed species.

These activities reflected American zoos' evolving understanding of their mission, which by the 1960s was expanding beyond providing recreation and entertainment to include education, research, and conservation. In the 1970s the environmental movement further encouraged zoos to prioritize conservation and highlight their ability to preserve species in captivity that were threatened in the wild.

In 1978 the zoo joined state and federal agencies and academic researchers to establish the Houston Toad Recovery Team, a project to protect this endangered species through establishment of a new, protected wild population. Until 1988 the zoo raised toads from eggs collected in the wild for release at the new site. During this period it was also recognized by the AZA for its captive propagation work with four other species, the Malayan pit viper (1967), the red bird-of-paradise (1979), the scarlet cock-of-the-rock (1980) and the Angolan python (1981).

A changing legal landscape also encouraged zoos to focus on captive breeding. A 1969 amendment to the United States Endangered Species Preservation Act prohibited import and sale of species in danger of extinction. In 1973 the passage of the Endangered Species Act and the establishment of the Convention on International Trade in Endangered Species of Wild Fauna and Flora (CITES) further regulated the import and sale of wildlife in the US. Finally, the AZA reinforced the shift by regulating member organizations' purchase of endangered animals.

In 1970 the Houston Zoo acquired most of its new animals, other than those born at the zoo, through trade or purchase from other zoos. By 1981, purchase was less common and the zoo was acquiring new animals primarily through trades or as breeding loans from other zoos. In a 1981 interview with Texas Monthly, director Werler explained that the zoo's goal was to exhibit "fewer species and more natural groupings of those that we have." He added, "this also gives us more of a genetic viability. Almost every major zoo is gearing up in this direction." The zoo began to assemble its breeding herd of Asian elephants after the species was declared endangered in 1976, in response to import restrictions on one of the most popular species for exhibit and the possibility that in the future, elephants might not be available for zoo display.

=== Innovation, financial challenges, and decline, 1970s-1990s ===
In the mid-1970s the zoo adopted a new master plan designed to reorient it as an educational institution teaching visitors about animals and nature through its exhibits. The plan called for a major remodeling of the Hermann Park site into a series of exhibit areas grouping species according to shared characteristics of their habitats, including a new aquarium, new moated enclosures for big cats, and a never-realized set of Arctic World, Tropical World, Desert World, Invisible World, and Island World groupings. It also proposed adding a safari park-style satellite campus that would allow the zoo to keep and exhibit more animals and include species that couldn't be housed responsibly at Hermann Park. The zoo's new Kipp Aquarium opened in 1981, and in 1985 the zoo opened its first permanent on-site veterinary hospital and its new big cat display areas.

In the mid-1980s, with Houston facing a municipal budget crisis stemming from the 1980s oil glut, city officials began to consider implementing an admission charge for the zoo for the first time since the Great Depression. The charge went into effect on January 1, 1989, with admission fees initially set at $2.50 for adults, $2.00 for senior citizens, and 50¢ for children from 3-12. In conjunction with this change the zoo unveiled more updates: a new sea lion pool, a new exhibit of Chinese alligators, and renovations to the reptile house that reorganized the displays into habitat-themed groups. The final major project from the 1970s-era master plan to be completed was a new primate exhibit to replace the 1950s-vintage primate house. Wortham World of Primates (1993) leveraged Houston's subtropical climate to provide its residents with large outdoor displays evoking their rain forest homes. Along with the new exhibit, the zoo added an off-display space to house geriatric monkeys and apes who had been retired from public view.

In the mid- and late 1990s, following a master plan completed in 1990, the zoo added a new Asian elephant habitat (1994) and renovated the small mammal house (1993), giraffe habitat (1996), aquarium (1997) and tropical bird house (1998). In 2000 the zoo opened a new children's zoo organized around Texas environments. Also in 2000, the Zoological Society unveiled a new 20-year fundraising and improvement plan intended to redesign the zoo as zones based on broad geographic regions (African plains and forests, the Arctic, Australia, Asia, Southern Shores) or specific biomes and habitats (Pantanal, Amazon basin, Andean cloud forest).

==== Safety concerns and keeper death, 1980s ====
In the early 1980s the zoo designed and built new big cat displays that replaced barred cages with larger, moated enclosures with grass and other plantings. The project was complicated by the difficulty of creating structures that were both naturalistic in appearance and effective at separating the cats from keepers and visitors. Although construction was completed in 1984, the exhibit did not open until November 1985 due to repeated postponements to fix gaps in security.

On May 12, 1988 keeper Ricardo Tovar was killed by a Siberian tiger in the exhibit when the tiger, named Miguel, broke the tempered glass in a viewing window in the door separating his habitat from a behind-the-scenes corridor where Tovar was standing. He pulled Tovar into the habitat and broke his neck. After Tovar's death the cats were taken off exhibit while the city reviewed the safety of the cat habitats and made more changes, including covering the viewing windows in all doors separating habitats from keeper work areas with steel plates. The exhibit reopened in April 1989.

Keepers interviewed at the time described the tragedy as a symptom of broader safety problems at the zoo. They spoke about understaffing that forced them to work alone, as Tovar was doing when he was killed, and a lack of communication equipment like radios or alarms for staff. They also described deteriorating facilities in the zoo, citing examples of asbestos pollution in the buildings and another case where an animal was able to escape its enclosure, this time a sable antelope--a large and potentially dangerous animal--that had broken a latch on an old gate separating its yard from the keeper work area.

==== 1999 city audit and zoo performance problems ====
In 1999 the Houston city controller's office completed a performance audit of the parks and recreation department, of which the zoo was a part, uncovering significant problems with its operations and animal care. The audit documented insufficient quarantine space at the aquarium, which placed the zoo at risk of falling out of compliance with AZA standards. It also found that animal diets were insufficient in both quantity and quality, with animals being provided less food than guidelines required, and fed primarily with processed products rather than species-appropriate whole foods. Keepers further reported cases of overcrowding and others where social animals had been isolated, and a poor management culture.

After the audit's findings were made public the city instituted closer oversight of the zoo, which upgraded quarantine facility, improved the animal diets, and worked to reopen lines of communication between employees and management. Director Donald Olson, a former parks department head who had become zoo director in 1993 after the retirement of longtime director John Werler, retired in May 2000.

=== The zoo under private management, 2000s-present: immersive exhibits and conservation focus ===
After a national search, the city of Houston hired Rick Barongi as zoo director in 2000. A zoo exhibit designer and executive whose most recent role had been as designer of Disney's Animal Kingdom, Barongi was a proponent of privatized zoo management, later recalling that he accepted the position on the condition that the Houston Zoo would be privatized. This approach was increasingly common among zoos at the turn of the twenty-first century, attracting support because donors were thought to be more likely to support a nonprofit and because it allowed the zoos to maintain more control over how funds were spent. In 2002 the city transferred operational responsibility for the zoo to a new 501(c)(3) nonprofit, Houston Zoo Inc., under a 50-year lease.

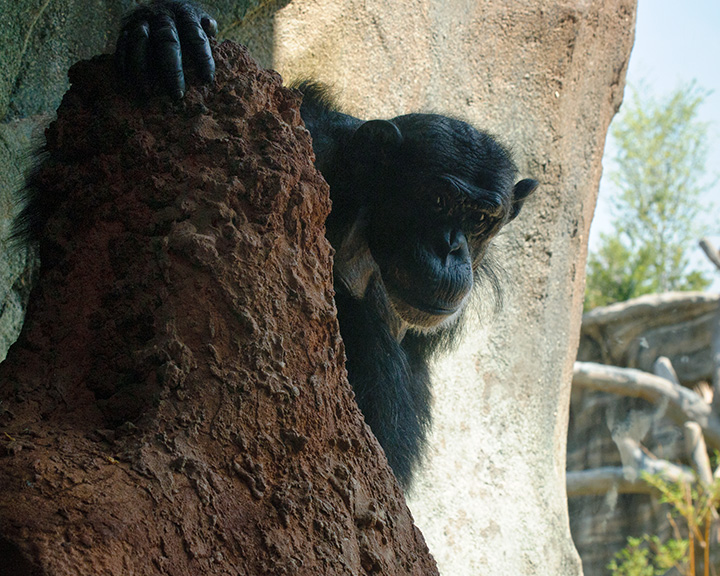
A chimpanzee in the African Forest, 2011.

One of the new organization's goals was to transform the zoo from a city amenity to a tourist destination that would attract visitors to Houston. This ambition was reflected by the largest project undertaken in the first decade of privatized management: an $80 million, two-stage African forest "immersive landscape" exhibit designed to tell stories about African forests as well as exhibiting animals. The first stage, which opened in 2010, featured new chimpanzee and white rhinoceros exhibits, and the second stage (2015) western lowland gorillas and red river hogs. In 2005 the zoo opened a new Natural Encounters exhibit, built to give people a sense of a close encounter with wildlife through the exhibit designs and via interactions with ambassador animals. An expanded space for Asian elephants, the McNair Elephant Habitat, opened in 2008 with a second phase in 2017.

The zoo also integrated conservation more completely into its activities, establishing its first formal conservation program in 2004. This area includes the zoo's regional wildlife conservation and reintroduction programs like its longstanding Attwater's prairie chicken work and a reestablished Houston toad program. In the 2000s the zoo led the effort to establish the El Valle Amphibian Conservation Center in Panama, now run by a Panamanian foundation, to preserve the Panamanian golden frog and other amphibians threatened by chytrid fungus. It also expanded its support of conservation organizations around the world and integrated conservation messages into its exhibits.

In September 2015 Lee Ehmke, former director of the Minnesota Zoo, became the new president and CEO of the Houston Zoo. Ehmke's background was also in zoo exhibit design, and he sought to orient the zoo's animal collections and exhibits towards fewer animals housed in more advanced exhibits that would educate visitors about the zoo's conservation work. These goals were reflected in the 20-year plan and centennial fundraising campaign unveiled in 2018, which called for updating the zoo into a series of "experiential zones" highlighting ecosystems and linking each species in the collection to the zoo's mission and conservation strategy. The zoo unveiled its current tagline-- "See them. Save them."-- along with the plan. In an interview, Ehmke described the plan as reflecting "the idea that we really needed to explicitly state and embody the idea that the zoo exists in order to help save animals in the wild."

The $150 million dollar campaign raised funds for new ecosystem-focused exhibits featuring Texas wetlands (2019), South American Pantanal (2020), and Galapagos Islands (2023) habitats, all of which were awarded top honors by the AZA. The zoo also renovated its black bear (2018) and orangutan (2020) habitats, and added a new Birds of the World exhibit area (2024). In 2022 the zoo celebrated its centennial, with Houston mayor Sylvester Turner declaring April 30 "Houston Zoo Day."

As part of its 2024 re-accreditation by the AZA the zoo received a score of "100% clean" on its inspection and evaluation, with the inspectors finding that all of the required standards for animal welfare, veterinary care, conservation efforts, and guest services were met "without exceptions." This was the first time that a large zoo had achieved this benchmark, and only the eighth time it had been reached in the AZA's history of evaluations. In June 2025 Lisa Peterson, former director of the San Diego Zoo Safari Park, became the zoo's president and CEO.

==== EEHV, vaccine research success, and elephant breeding controversies ====
In the mid-2000s the zoo was identified as a hot spot for elephant endotheliotropic herpesvirus (EEHV), which was killing many of its Asian elephant calves. An adult elephant, Kimba, also died of EEHV in 2004. The virus, discovered in 1990, kills elephants through a fast-acting hemorrhagic disease. With a mortality rate of around 70% in animals that develop symptoms, it has become a major killer of Asian elephants in captivity.

In 2009 the zoo began a partnership with researchers from the Baylor College of Medicine to develop a diagnostic test for the virus and a vaccine to prevent its spread. The team led by Dr. Paul Ling created a PCR test for EEHV that enabled testing and treatment of infected animals before they became symptomatic, increasing their chances of recovery. They then developed an mRNA vaccine against the disease. In June 2024 Tess, a Houston Zoo elephant, was the first recipient of the new vaccine. Following her successful treatment, the Houston Zoo shared the vaccine with other zoos which have also begun to report success. In two peer-reviewed papers published in July 2026, researchers reported that the vaccine generated a sustained immune response against EEHV proteins in clinical trials, and that two vaccinated elephants who had naturally contracted EEHV recovered without developing symptoms. In 2025 the zoo received top honors for research from the AZA for its work on diagnostics, treatment and prevention of EEHV in juvenile elephants.

During the same period, the zoo's decision to continue breeding Asian elephants despite the presence of EEHV in its herd was targeted by the animal rights groups People for the Ethical Treatment of Animals (PETA) and In Defense of Animals (IDA). IDA has included the Houston Zoo in its annual top-ten list of the worst North American zoos for elephants five times since it began the list in 2004, and in 2025 designated the zoo as the #1 worst zoo in North America. IDA condemns the zoo for its breeding practices, including the use of artificial insemination and its imposition of a more compressed schedule of pregnancies than elephants would naturally experience in the wild, but especially for its decision to continue elephant breeding between the discovery of EEHV and the implementation of the vaccine. In its 2025 rankings it attacked the zoo for, in IDA's words, having "admitted it will continue breeding calves to study the virus, even as the calves died."

When the zoo issued public responses to these attacks and the animal rights groups' criticisms of the limited space available to elephants in all zoos, it dismissed the idea of pausing its breeding program until a cure for EEHV was found, and emphasized the high quality of the care its elephants receive. The zoo responded to its inclusion in IDA's 2008 top-ten worst zoos list by arguing that it really belonged on a "top ten best zoos for elephants" list because of its high keeper ratio and the amenities of its then-new McNair Asian Elephant Habitat. In 2010 IDA filed a complaint with the USDA asking to have elephant breeding in zoos where EEHV was present, including the Houston Zoo, ruled in violation of animal welfare rules. The zoo responded by describing IDA as an extremist group and claiming that "no group of elephants is monitored as closely or tested as routinely" as theirs.

== Exhibits ==
=== Current exhibits ===
==== African Forest ====
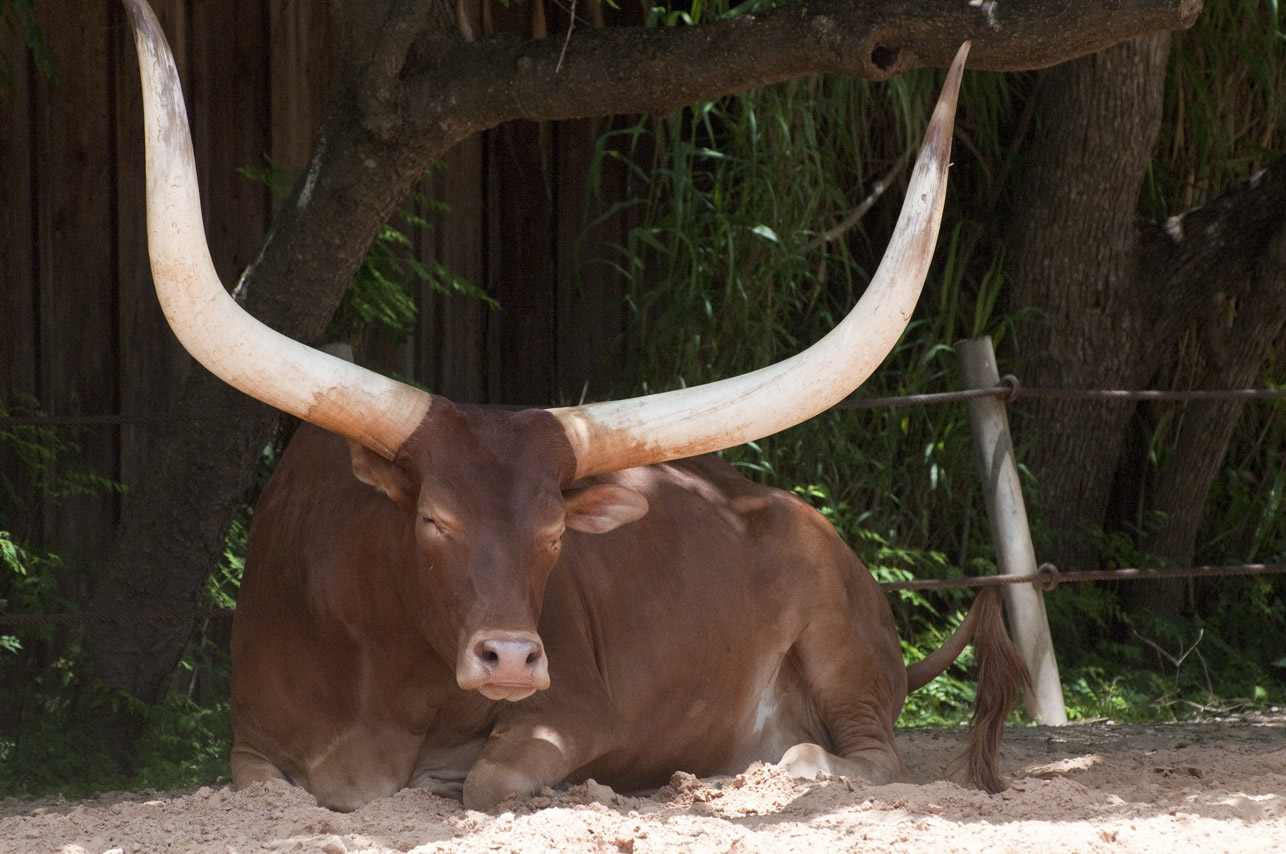
Ankole resting in the shade. The Houston Zoo displayed Ankole cattle, native to East and Central Africa, until the death of bull Luni Tune in 2026.

Called the most ambitious project in the zoo's then 88-year history, the African Forest officially opened on December 10, 2010 and was expanded with Gorillas of the African Forest in 2015. It was designed as an immersive exhibit which would "tell stories about the African forest," and is home to many African species, including the Grant's zebra, white rhinoceros, red river hog, Masai giraffe, ostrich, chimpanzee, and western lowland gorilla. Primatologist Jane Goodall toured the exhibit in 2010 and praised the chimpanzee habitat; contrasting it with the hazards faced by wild chimps, she said, "if you look at it from the point of view of a chimpanzee, then, this is a place I'd like to be." The giraffe habitat was renovated in 2026 to add a shade canopy and other upgrades, and the white rhino habitat is closed through 2026 for renovation and expansion. The zoo displays African herbivores including okapi, zebras, pygmy hippo and antelopes in an area adjacent to the African Forest.

==== Carnivores ====
This area of the zoo houses African lions, painted dogs, cheetah, American black bears, a Komodo dragon, an Amur leopard, a Malayan tiger, and cougars. Since 1947 one of the zoo's cougars has always been Shasta, the University of Houston mascot. The current incumbent is Shasta VII, who came to Houston in 2022 with his brother Louie after being found as an orphaned cub in Washington state.

==== Fondren Foundation Birds of the World ====
Opened in 2024, this exhibit includes three aviaries. North American Woodlands houses eleven species of American songbirds, all of which were rescued by the US Fish and Wildlife Service from the pet trade and found ineligible for return to the wild. African Savanna houses twelve species including crowned cranes, vultures, storks, and hamerkops. This aviary includes a water hole feature and an artificial carcass feeder resembling a Cape buffalo skeleton, designed to allow the vultures to engage in natural feeding behavior. South American Wetlands is a walk-through, free-flight aviary housing Chilean flamingos, white-faced whistling ducks, and lapwings.

==== Galapagos Islands ====
This immersive, conservation-focused exhibit, opened April 7, 2023, includes habitats for California sea lions, Galapagos tortoises--including three who came to the zoo in 1928--and Humboldt penguins, as well as the zoo's walk-through One Ocean aquarium housing green sea turtles, sharks, stingrays and other fish. The California sea lions and Humboldt penguins are displayed as stand-ins for the endangered and strictly protected Galapagos species of those animals. This exhibit received top honors from the AZA in 2024.

==== John P. McGovern Children's Zoo ====
Opened in 2000 and named for donor John P. McGovern, this is an area of child-friendly and child-focused exhibits including a goat yard, river otters, red pandas, a bat cave, and the zoo's Wildlife Carousel. The children's zoo area includes the zoo's insectarium, the Bug House (opened 2014), which exhibits native and exotic insects and arachnids including a colony of leaf-cutter ants.

==== Kathrine G. McGovern Texas Wetlands ====
Opened in 2019 and named for donor Kathrine G. McGovern, this exhibit features three Texas species--the bald eagle, American alligator, and whooping crane--that were once close to extinction and are now recovering or have recovered. The site, formerly the zoo duck pond, was redesigned to be a self-sustaining ecosystem that filters water from the exhibits and provides a space for local wildlife. This exhibit received top honors from the AZA in 2021.

==== McNair Asian Elephant Habitat ====
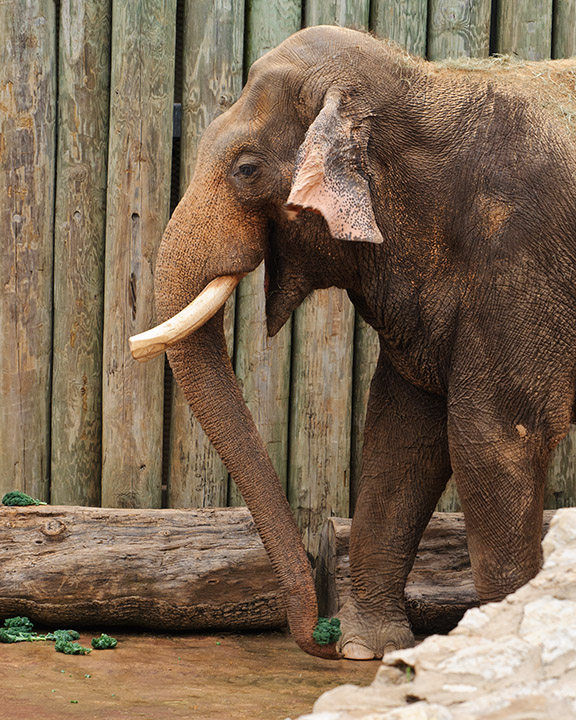
Asian elephant enjoying a broccoli treat

This exhibit opened in 2008 with an expansion in 2017, and is named for donors Janice and Robert McNair. The first phase included a two-acre yard area, a new barn, and an 80,000-gallon swimming pool designed with terraces to help calves learn to swim. The second phase added an additional 1.5 acres of space, a second barn for bull elephants, and a new 160,000 gallon pool. The area also includes a boardwalk for viewers and a seating area for keeper demonstrations.

==== Reptile and Amphibian house ====
This building houses displays of snakes, frogs, lizards, newts, and turtles and tortoises. Opened in 1961, it is the zoo's oldest exhibit building. Among the species on display are northern caiman lizards, including one successfully treated for cancer in 2025, Panamanian golden frogs, king cobras and black mambas.

==== South America's Pantanal ====
This immersive, conservation-focused exhibit area opened on October 10, 2020, highlighting a region where the zoo is supporting conservation projects. The species on display include the blue-throated macaw, jaguar, giant river otter, Baird's tapir, greater rhea, capybara, and giant anteater. The exhibit also displays the blue-billed curassow, a critically-endangered bird found in Colombia which the zoo has been working to breed and conserve in the wild since the 1970s. The exhibit earned top honors from the AZA in 2022.

==== Wortham World of Primates ====
Opened in 1993 and named for donors the Wortham Foundation, this two-acre exhibit area is considered by the zoo to be the first of its immersive habitats. It includes eleven large open-air enclosures with natural plants and trees, providing an approximation of the rain forest homes of the lemurs, monkeys, gibbons and orangutans. Visitors move through the exhibit on an elevated boardwalk. The species on display include patas monkeys, Malaysian painted river terrapins, howler monkeys, and white-cheeked gibbons.

=== Selected former exhibits ===
==== Free-flight aviary (1926-1961) ====
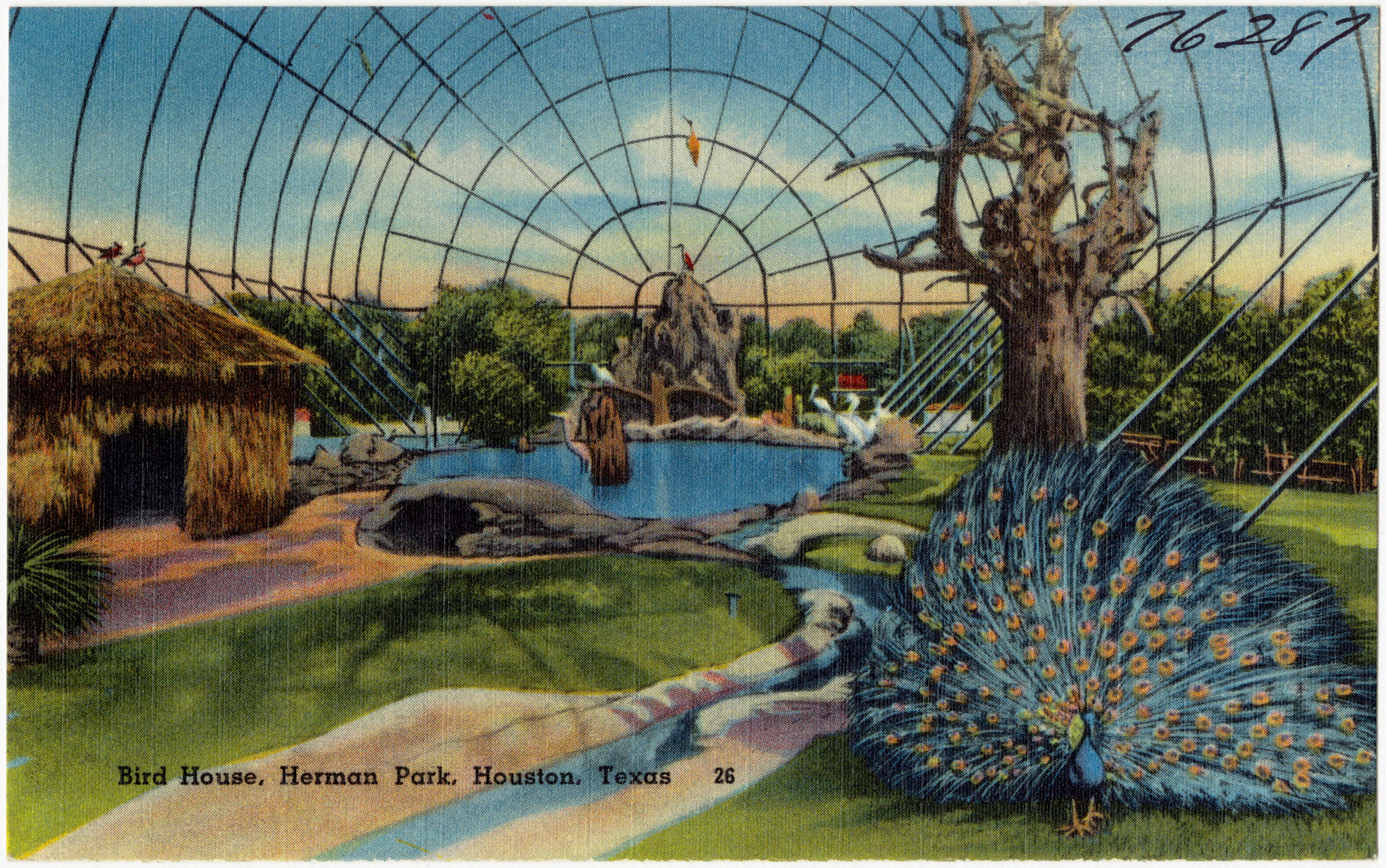
The Houston Zoo's first free-flight aviary, featuring concrete sculptures by Dionicio Rodriguez.

The zoo's first free-flight bird exhibit was designed by Houston Superintendent of Parks Clarence Brock. Brock commissioned San Antonio-based artist Dionicio Rodriguez to create concrete sculptures of trees, a grotto fountain, and a pond for the exhibit space, the only known zoo exhibit to feature Rodriguez's work. The sculptures survived after the aviary, damaged by hurricane Carla, was dismantled. They were added to the National Register of Historic Places in 2005. The grotto fountain was rebuilt in 2011-2012. Along with Rodriguez's original faux bois trees, it is now part of the zoo's South American Wetlands aviary.

==== Primate house (1950-c. 1990) ====
Located at the foot of the zoo's reflection pool, this was the first post-World War II zoo building. It had two wings of outdoor-facing cages extending out from a spine where, facing the reflection pool, an outdoor moated island provided an exhibit space without bars. The structure was decorated with bas-relief images of primates which were preserved when the building was demolished in the early 1990s to make space for its successor, Wortham World of Primates, and relocated throughout the zoo.

==== Small mammal house (1962-2001) and Carruth Natural Encounters (2005-2025) ====
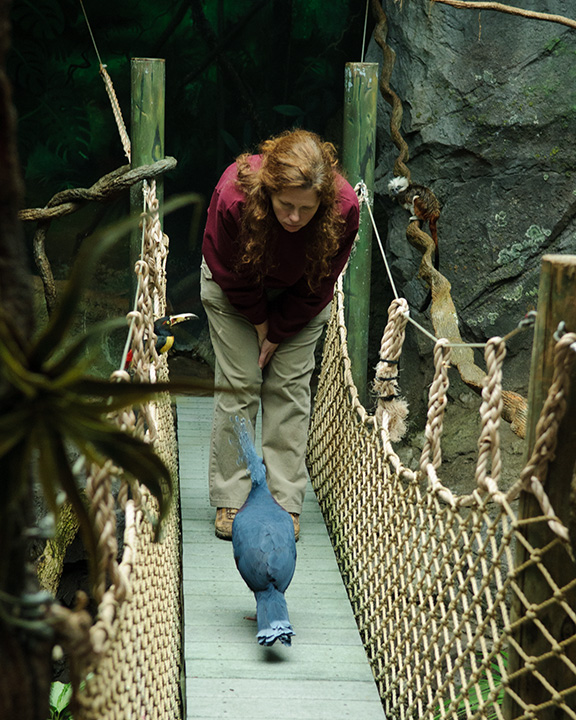
A keeper in the Carruth Natural Encounters building, interacting with a crowned pigeon as a toucan and a cotton-top tamarin look on.

The small mammal house, located near the zoo entrance, was originally constructed in the mid-twentieth century "sanitary modernist" style, exhibiting animals in small enclosures with minimal naturalistic features. It included a display area for nocturnal animals. In 1993 it was remodeled into a "small mammal world" with displays organized around a biodiversity theme, including a multistory habitat housing squirrel monkeys and sloths. The small mammal house closed in 2001 and in 2005, after extensive renovations, the building reopened as Carruth Natural Encounters, named for donors Ethel and Allen Carruth. Natural Encounters was designed to make visitors feel immersed in a variety of natural habitats including river's edge, rain forest canopy, desert and coral reef, and to get visitors close to the animals. It included elements like a crawl-through tube allowing children to approach the piranhas, and its programming featured opportunities for visitors to feed animals and engage with ambassador animals. Natural Encounters was recognized as a significant achievement in 2007 by the AZA. The building was closed in March 2025 due to aging infrastructure, which the zoo described as "no longer meet[ing] the needs of our animals or the expectations of our guests."

==== Tropical bird house (1966-2020) ====
This building, located next to the reflection pool, was one of the zoo's first efforts to integrate naturalistic elements into its exhibits. It centered on a three-story free-flight aviary designed as two habitats, Far East tropical rain forest and Mayan ruins, with a transparent roof, plants, and rushing waterfalls. It was refurbished in a 1996-98 renovation, and closed in 2020.

==== Gorilla habitat (1973-2004) ====
This was a fully indoor environment, considered to be best practice for gorillas in zoos when it opened in 1973. In 1981 Stephen Harrigan of Texas Monthly described the structure as "a large circular building that looks from the outside like the stump of a giant tree," and the display area as "a great swath of stage scenery with sculptured terraces and dead trees and a tiny waterfall that cascades through a series of pools." The facility exhibited gorillas as singletons or pairs; Harrigan also noted that Vanilla, a gorilla who lived in the exhibit alone after the death of her companion Je-Je, liked to watch cartoons in an off-display area where a keeper would turn on the TV for her. The building was closed after the death of its last resident, M'Kubwa (Mac), in 2004. It was demolished to make space for the African Forest chimpanzee exhibit.

==== Kipp Aquarium (1981-2020) ====
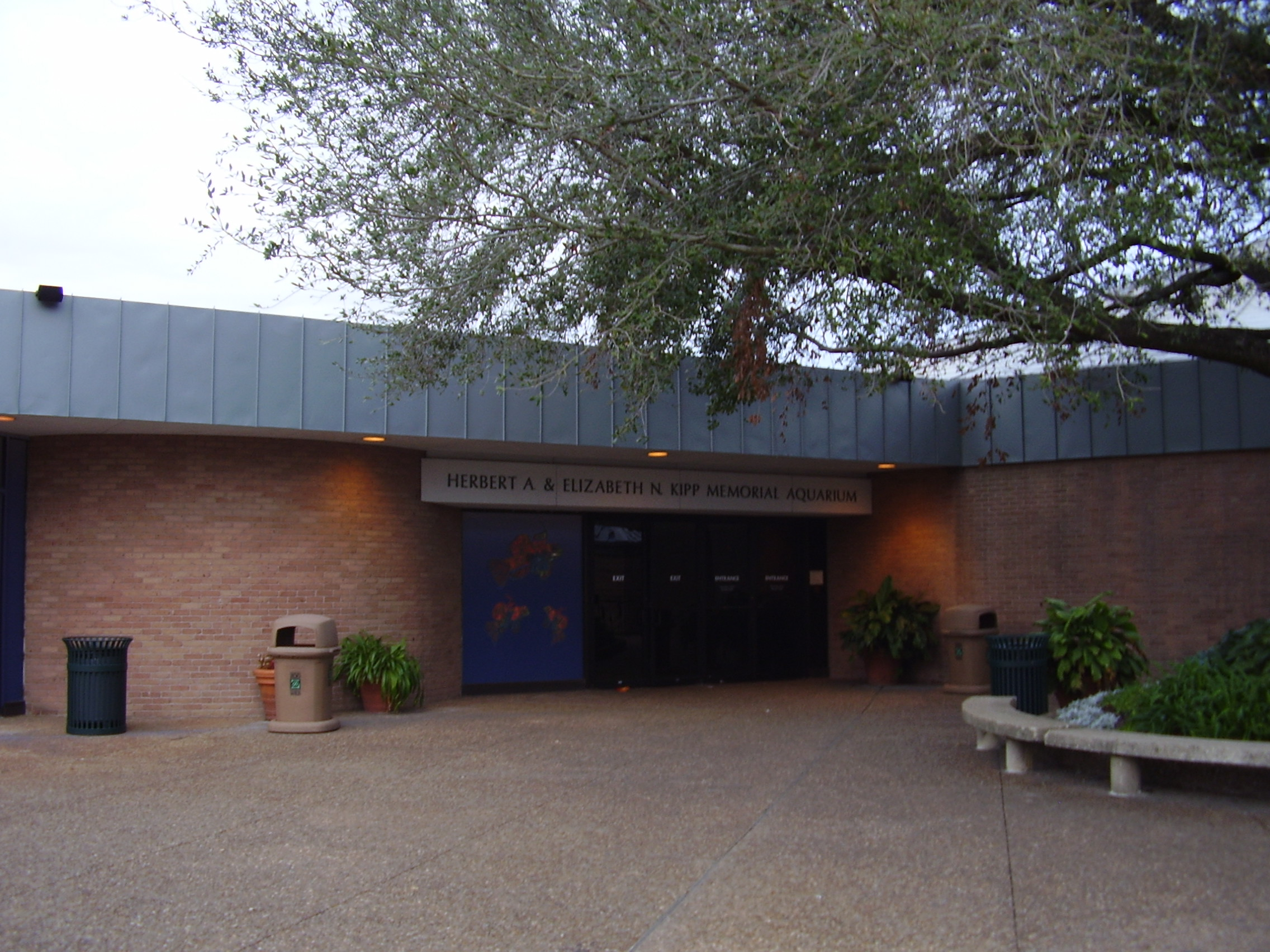
The outside of the Kipp Aquarium, c. 2009

The aquarium, named for donors Herbert and Elizabeth Kipp, was located near the zoo entrance. It was closed in 2020 to make space for the Galapagos Islands exhibit. Its original features included a 5000-gallon tank, an exhibit of venomous fish, and a "Denizens of the Deep" exhibit featuring sharks and moray eels. A 1997 expansion and reconfiguration featured a Texas coast exhibit and an Amazon flooded forest wing.

==== McGovern Mammal Marina (1989-2023) ====
This exhibit, named for donors John P. and Kathrine G. McGovern, was located near the zoo entrance. It was the zoo's third sea lion pool, replacing a smaller pool that had closed in 1986 and was itself a replacement for the zoo's original 1920s sea lion pool, which had been demolished to build the primate house in the 1950s. The exhibit featured a beach area and a shaded resting area for the animals. Its residents included Ethyl, a sea lion with epilepsy who lived in the exhibit from 1989 until her death in 1996. She served as the focal point of an annual Epilepsy Awareness Day, when children with epilepsy and their families could learn about her and how her condition was managed by her keepers. The mammal marina closed in 2023 and the sea lions were moved to the new Galapagos Islands exhibit.

== Conservation ==
The Houston Zoo is an active partner in the AZA's Species Survival Plan (SSP) Program, a population management and conservation program for selected species housed in North American zoos, and its SAFE: Saving Animals From Extinction program, which works to conserve species in the wild.

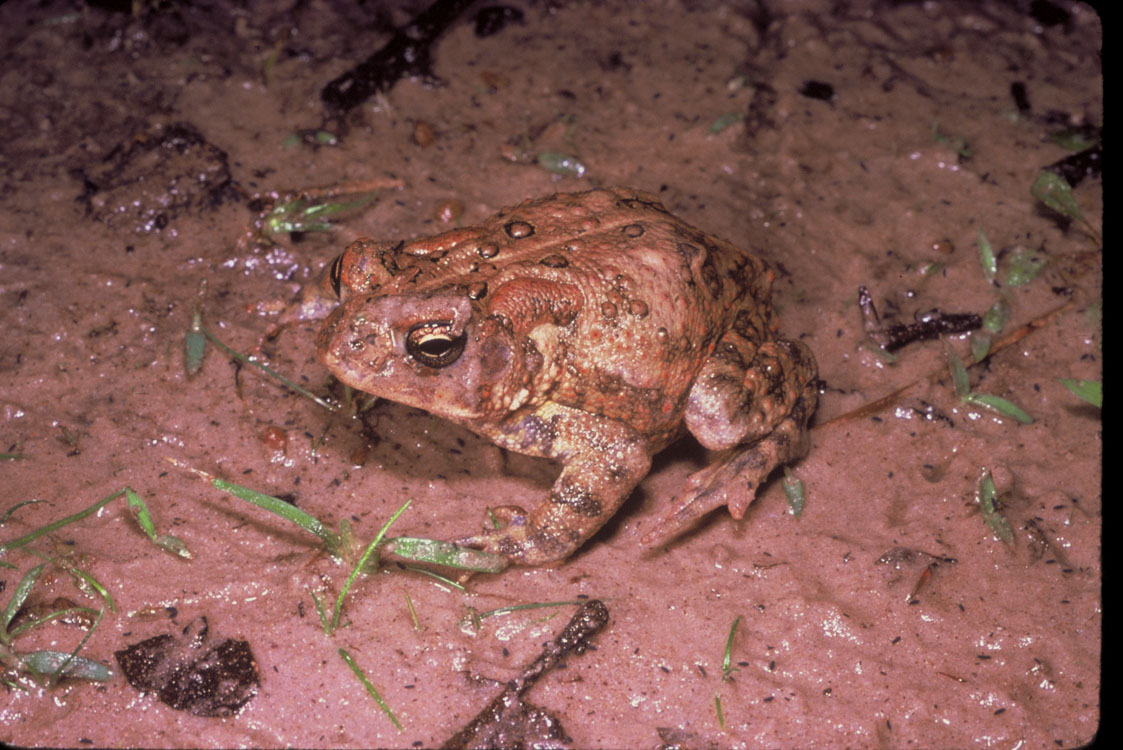
A Houston toad in the wild.

In southeast Texas, the zoo has participated in a captive breeding program for the Attwater's prairie chicken since 1994, raising birds in captivity for return to the wild. Since the program's beginning more than 1400 zoo-raised chickens have been released. Since 2007 the zoo has taken part in efforts to restore the wild population of Houston toads, a species it also supported in the 1980s. The zoo maintains a captive population of toads to provide eggs and tadpoles for placement in the species' wild range; in 2025 it contributed 1,599,654 eggs, 8115 tadpoles, and 277 toadlets to the effort. The zoo has provided medical care to stranded or injured sea turtles since 2010, treating 148 turtles in 2025.

The zoo partners with organizations in Texas and internationally to support their conservation work. In 2025 its partners included organizations in Latin America (Belize, Colombia, Brazil, Bolivia, and Ecuador/Galapagos Islands), Africa (Uganda, Nigeria, Kenya, Rwanda, Democratic Republic of the Congo, Mozambique, Namibia, and Madagascar) and Asia (India, Malaysia and Indonesia). It provides partners with financial support for research, habitat conservation and restoration, wildlife protection, education, and community enhancement projects, as well as facilitating the participation of zoo staff, volunteers, and students in conservation projects. Among the species aided by these partnerships are the whooping crane (International Crane Foundation partnership), Sumatran rhinoceros (International Rhino Foundation partnership), Borneo elephant (Seratu Astai partnership), black rhinoceros (Integrated Rural Development and Nature Conservation (Namibia) partnership), giant armadillo (Instituto de Conservação de Animals Silvestres (Brazil) partnership), lions, leopards and African wild dogs (Niassa Carnivore Center (Mozambique) and Ewaso Lions (Kenya) partnerships) and Galapagos tortoises (Fundacíon ECOS (Galapagos) partnership).

== Gallery ==
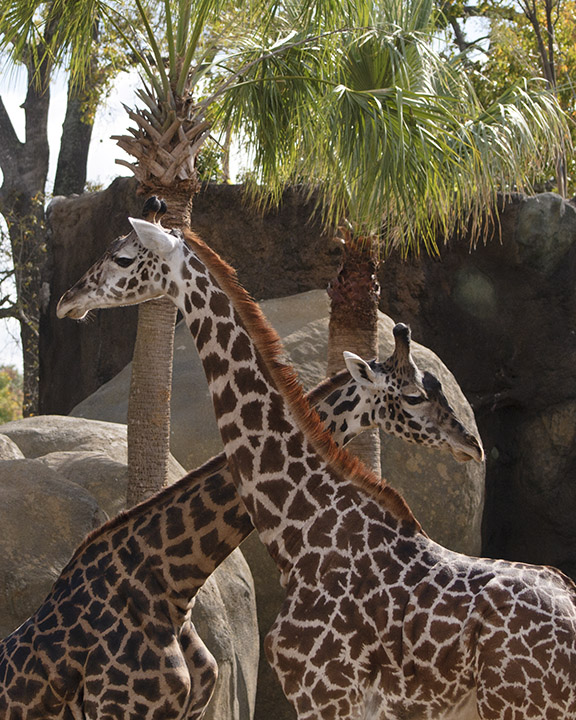
Giraffes at the zoo

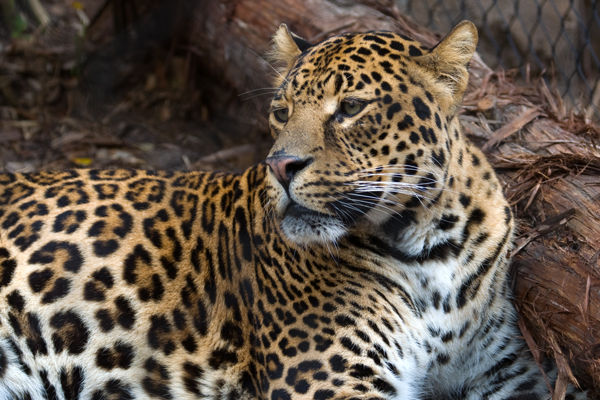
Jaguar

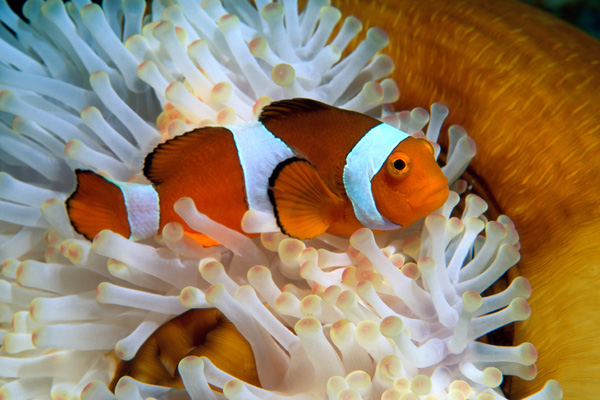
Clown fish

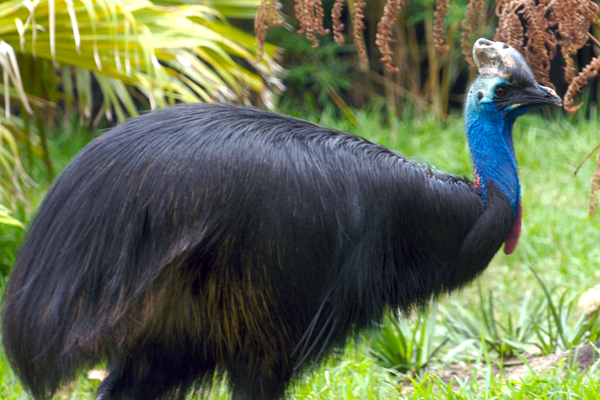
Cassowary

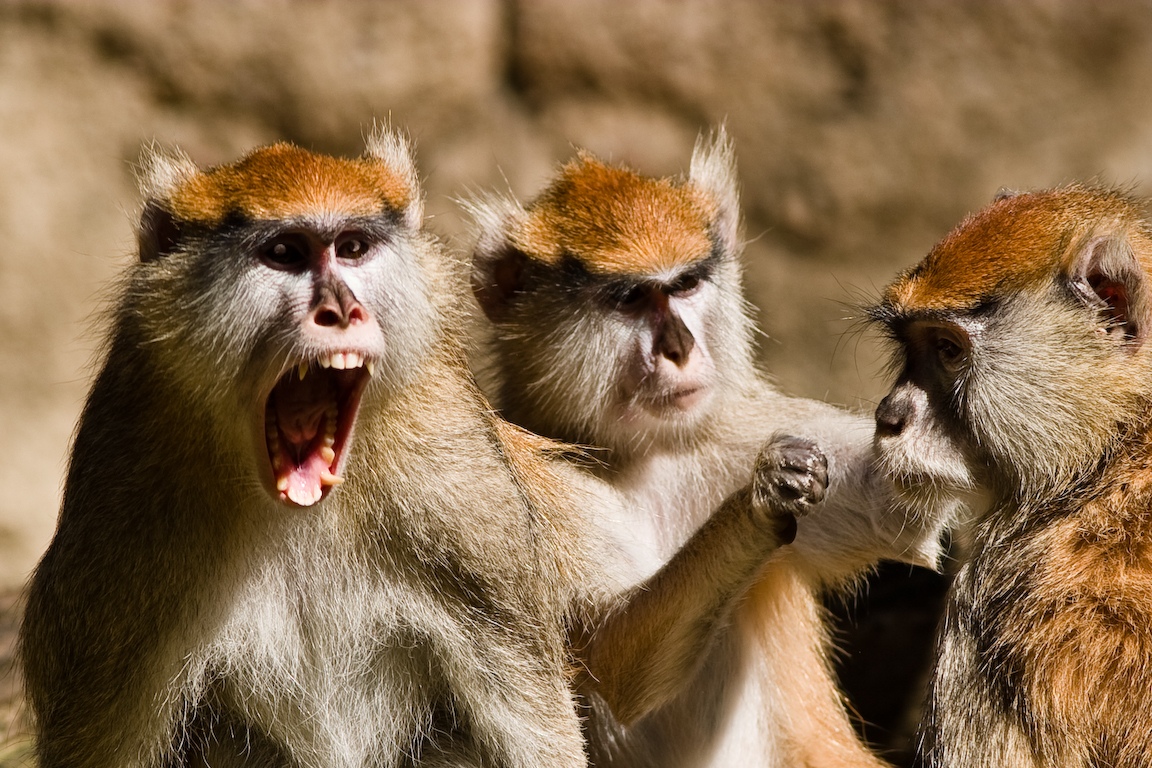
Patas monkeys (Erythrocebus patas)

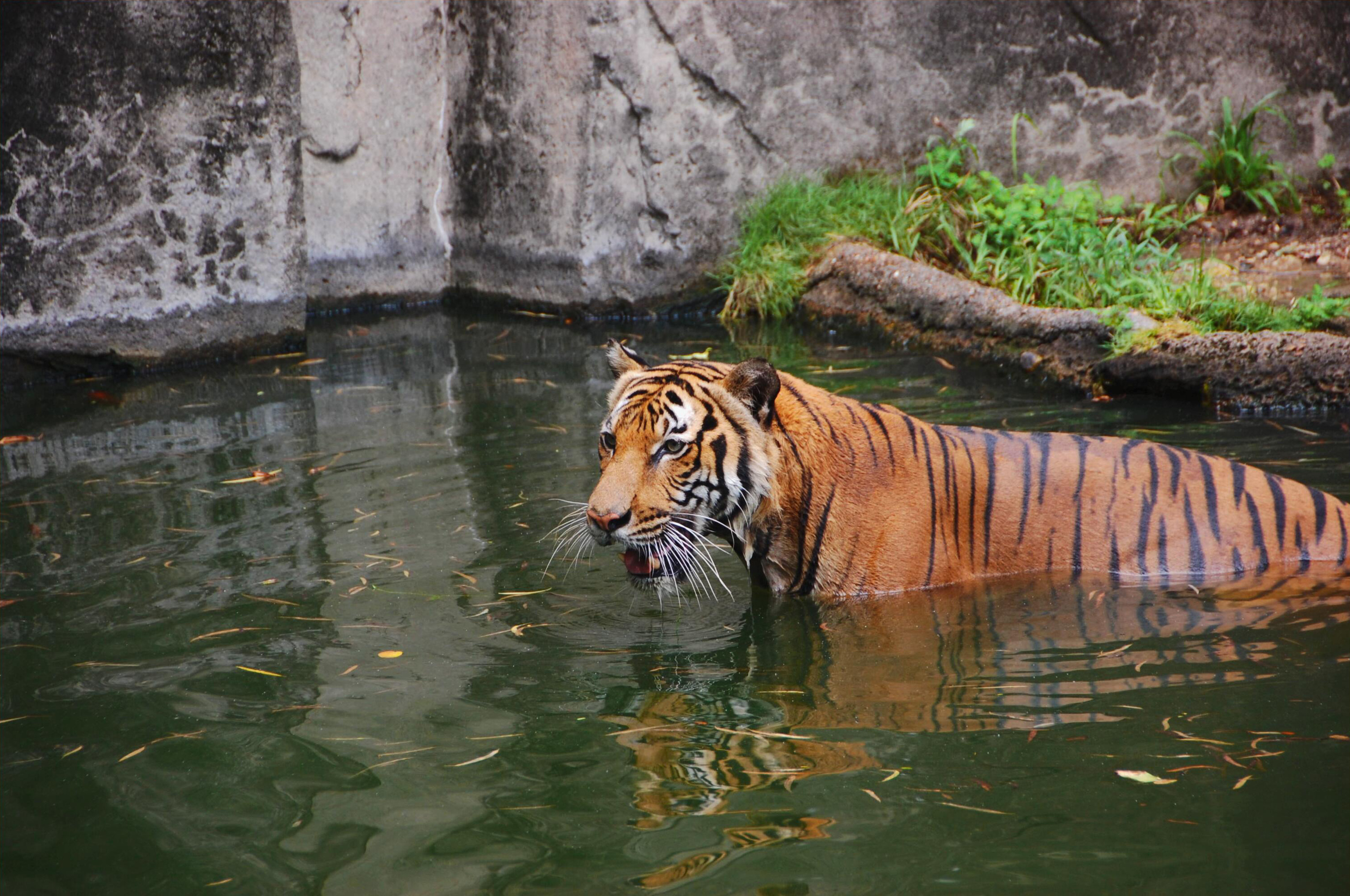
Tiger

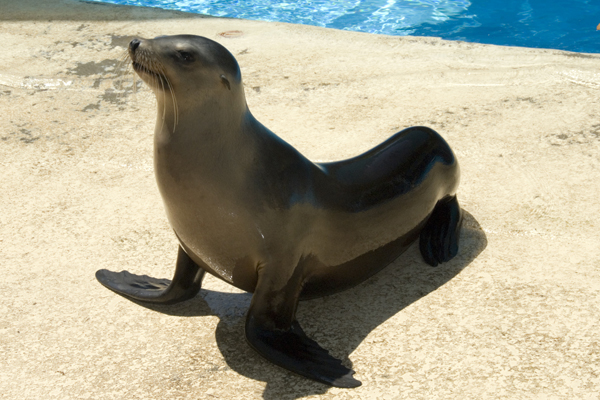
Sea lion

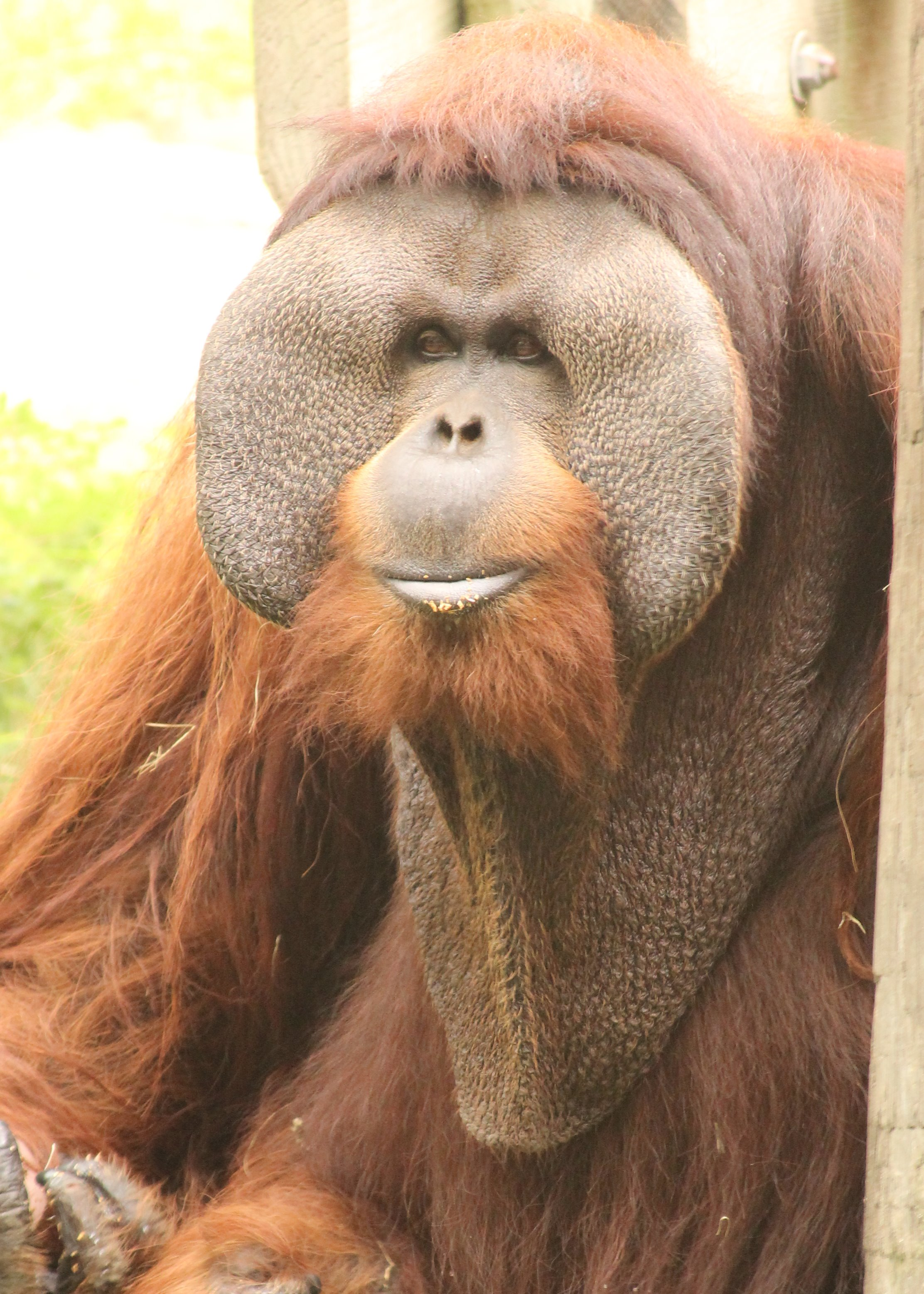
Male Hybrid orangutan "Rudi" at the zoo

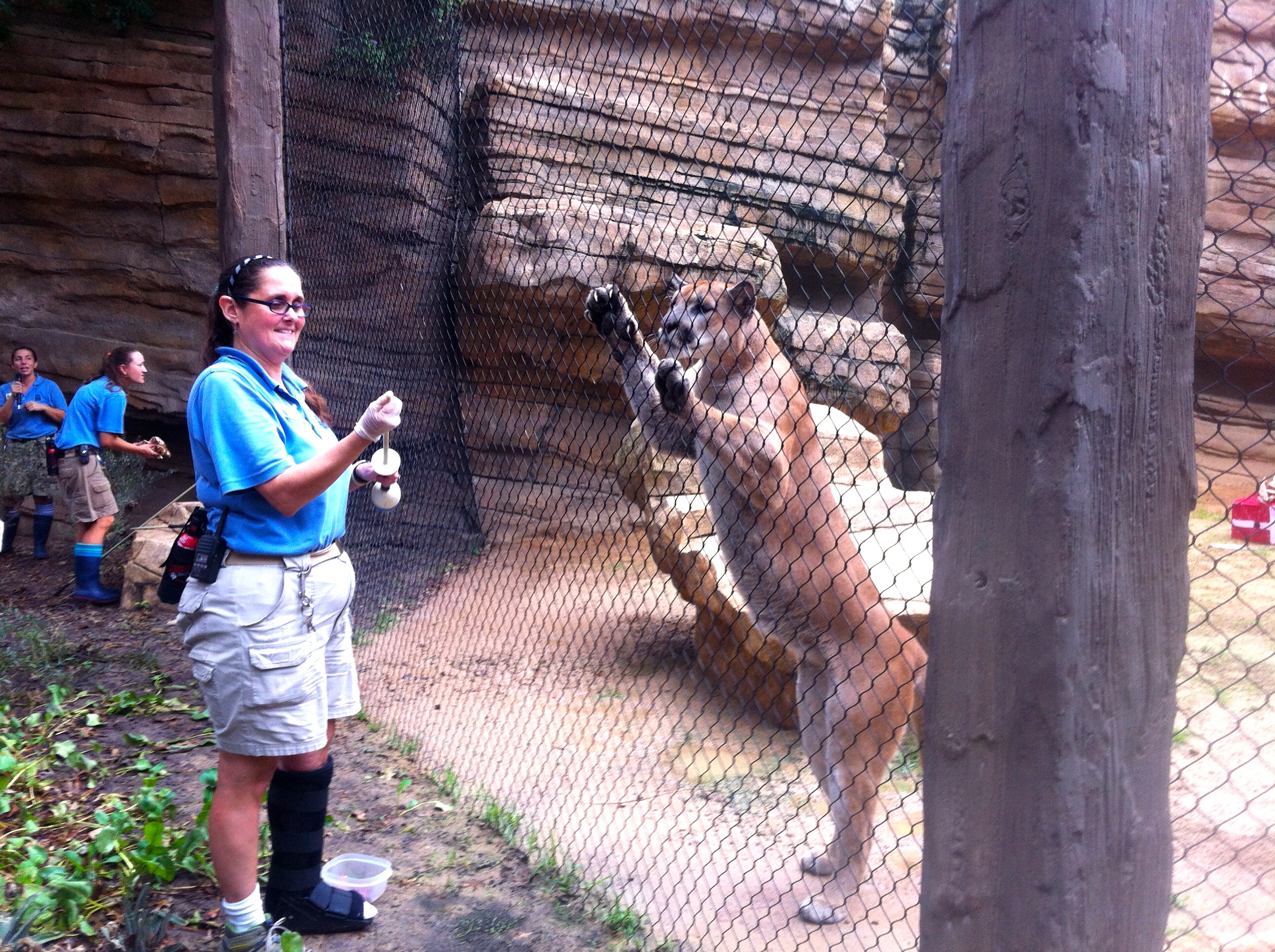
Shasta VI, the mascot of the University of Houston, with a Houston Zoo trainer

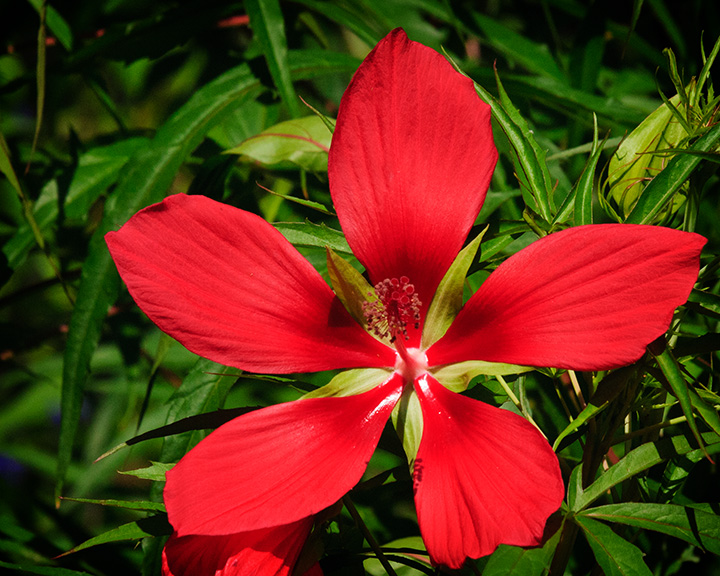
Red hibiscus, one of the many flowering plants at the zoo
