= Sandra Owusu-Gyamfi =

Ghanaian conservationist and herpetologist

- Education: Kwame Nkrumah University of Science & Technology & University of Greenwich
- Occupation: Conservationist
- Known for: Ghana's first woman herpetologist

Sandra Owusu-Gyamfi is a Ghanaian conservationist and the first woman herpetologist in Ghana. She is currently the Associate Executive Director and the Advocacy and Campaigns Director for SAVE THE FROGS! Ghana. In 2017, she became Manager of Research and Conservation at Ghana Wildlife Society's Science Unit.

Owusu-Gyamfi received her bachelor’s degree in Environmental Science from the Kwame Nkrumah University of Science & Technology in Ghana. She then went to study at the University of Greenwich in the United Kingdom, where she graduated with a Master’s degree in Environmental Conservation.

She was a member of the team who found a population of the critically endangered Giant Squeaker Frog (Arthroleptis krokosua) in 2013. In 2017, Owusu-Gyamfi received a grant from The Pollination Project. The grant was used to fund a day long event aimed at increasing the local communities' knowledge about the importance of frogs and increase awareness about the Togo Slippery Frog (Conraua derooi) in the Atewa Range Forest Reserve. She was part of Resson Kantai Duff's 2020 Mongabay article, where they addressed racism in conservation science in Africa.
