= Ewaso Lions =

Kenyan non-profit organization

- Founded: 2007
- Founder: Dr. Shivani Bhalla
- Type: Non-profit Organization
- Purpose: Lion Conservation
- Location: Kenya
- Region served: Samburu National Reserve, Buffalo Springs National Reserve and Shaba National Reserve
- Key people: Resson Kantai Duff
- Website: ewasolions.org

The Ewaso Lions Project was founded in 2007 for the protection of lions (Panthera leo) and their habitat in Northern Kenya. The project works to study and incorporate local communities in helping to protect the lions in the Samburu National Reserve, Buffalo Springs National Reserve and Shaba National Reserve of the Ewaso Nyiro ecosystem in Northern Kenya.

The lion is a vulnerable species, having seen a major population decline of 30–50% over the past two decades. Currently there are fewer than 2,000 lions in Kenya.

The Ewaso Lions Project research camp sits within the Westgate Community Conservancy, west of Samburu National Reserve. Shivani Bhalla, representing the Ewaso Lions is a regular featured guest speaker at the annual Wildlife Conservation Network Expo.

== Programs ==
=== Scientific research ===
The Ewaso Lions Project core research focuses on discovering the factors that drive lion pride locations and movements and the extent of conflict with humans, as well as the effect of habitat loss. Methods include a lion census to estimate population, size and trends; surveys of local communities to gauge extent of human-lion conflict and its impact; camera traps are set to document lion activity; fitting lions with radio and GPS collars to map movements in and out of reserves; scat analysis to understand feeding patterns.

=== Community outreach ===
The Ewaso Lions Project works with local communities to find ways that people can coexist with lions. Community Outreach programs include: "Warrior Watch" which recruits and trains Samburu warriors to collect data and respond to community issues like livestock depredation; primary school education on wildlife and wildlife clubs in schools along with scholarships for students interested in conservation as well as taking children on safaris to see the animals first hand; a mobile film project that shows wildlife films in rural villages gives local people an opportunity to see the animals up close; a book compiling poems, stories, myths and drawings about lions from the local community; and a race each year to bring the community together and bring awareness to lion conservation.

== See also ==
- Conservation movement
- Natural environment
