= Resson Kantai Duff =

Conservationist

Resson Kantai Duff is a Kenyan conservationist and the deputy director at Ewaso Lions.

== Early life and education ==
Kantai's father belonged to a nomadic Maasai community, which gave her an early knowledge about wildlife and how to protect them. She earned her Bachelor's degree with honours at the University of Nairobi. She received a scholarship from the Wildlife Conservation Network and she went to study at the University of Oxford, where she obtained a MSc in Biodiversity, Conservation, and Management.

== Career ==
Kantai worked at Save the Elephants, first as a Projects Officer and later on as the Head of Awareness. She was also a writer and editor for the International Institute for Sustainable Development. She currently works at Ewaso Lions as the Deputy Director.

Early in her career, Kantai was part of an elephant conservation project aimed at improving cross-cultural understanding between China (the world’s biggest consumer of illegal ivory) and Kenya. She participated, together with Chris Kiarie, on the "From Kenya to China" conservation tour in June 2014. As part of this trip, they travelled to five different cities in China, to better understand ivory trafficking and use, as well as to provide educational talks on elephant conservation. In late 2021, Kantai gave a TED talk on the importance of empowering local communities in conservation biology.

== Leadership ==
Kantai is a strong advocate of the importance of diversity in conservation science. She participated in the conference Pathways Kenya 2020 "Open the Door to Diverse Voices". She has spoken about the need to decolonise conservation. Most notably, in November 2020, she wrote a commentary article on Mongabay, where she addressed racism in conservation science in Africa. In this article, twenty African women shared their experiences of inequality in the workplace. This article was amongst the ten most viewed articles that month in the website.

Kantai is also a board member of the Conservation Alliance of Kenya; at her time of joining she was elected as the youngest member of the Board.
