= Sama Indians =

Native American indigeous group

The Sama are a Native American indigenous group from Texas. During the European colonization, they founded the San Antonio de Valero Mission, in San Antonio in 1719. They moved into the Mission in the 1740s.
