= Clara Driscoll (philanthropist) =

American philanthropist and author

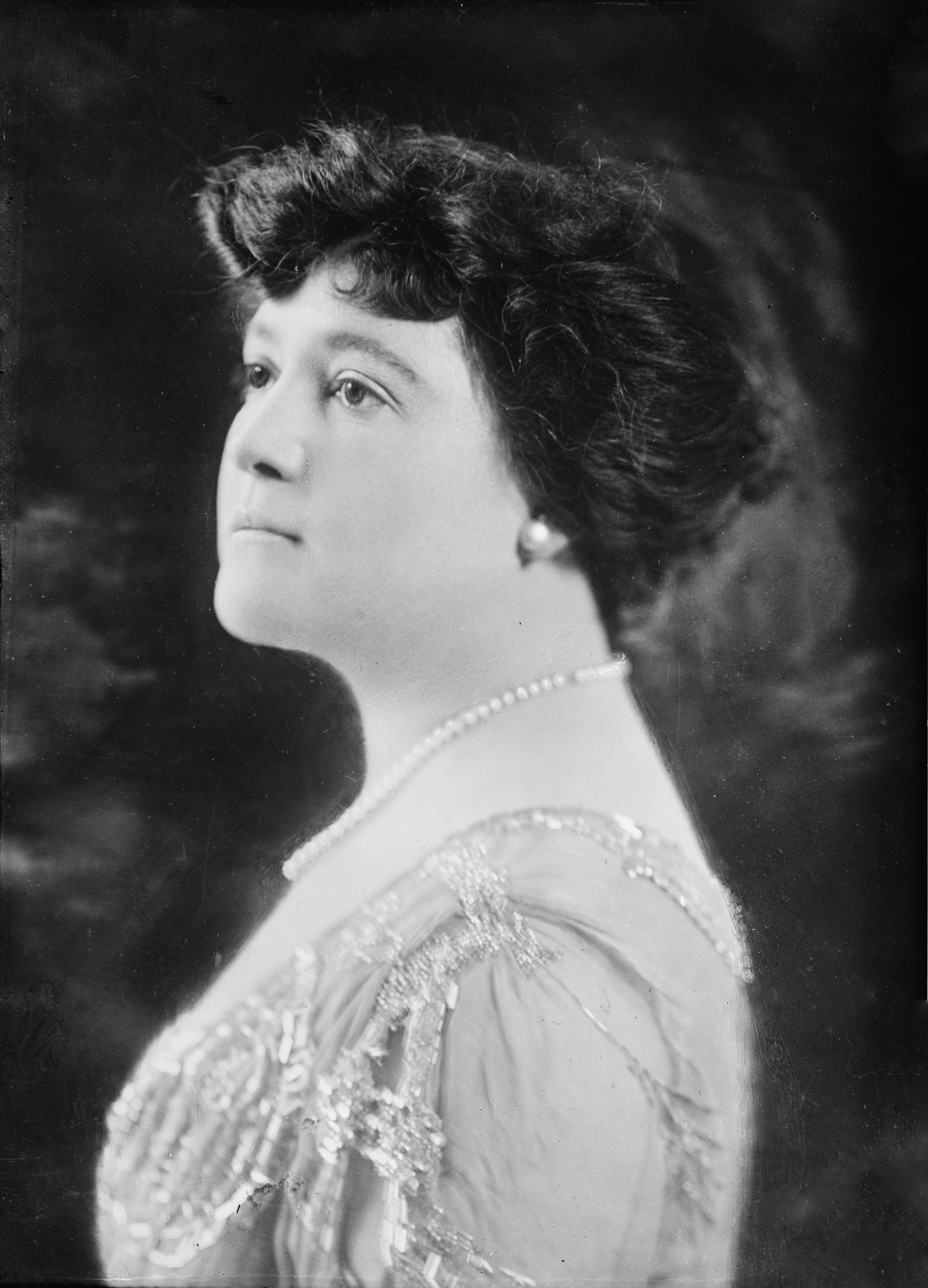
- Clara Driscoll circa 1913
- Born: April 2, 1881; St. Mary's of Aransas, Texas, US
- Died: July 17, 1945 (aged 64); Corpus Christi, Texas, US
- Occupations: Philanthropist, historic preservationist, businesswoman
- Known for: Saving the Alamo
- Spouse: Henry Hulme Sevier (1906–1937)
- Parent(s): Robert Driscoll Sr. Catherine McGrath Duggan Driscoll

Clara Driscoll (April 2, 1881 – July 17, 1945), was a Texas-born philanthropist. Driscoll is known as the "Savior of the Alamo" for her work to preserve the site of the Battle of the Alamo.

== The Biography ==
=== Her Family's background ===
Driscoll's grandfather Daniel O'Driscoll had been born in County Cork, Ireland. and was a veteran of the Battle of San Jacinto. In return for his service, he was awarded 1,200 acres (4.9 km^{2}), plus an additional one-third of a league of land, in Victoria County, Texas. He also served as a Refugio County Judge. In 1837, Daniel married Catherine McGrath Duggan (1796–1852), of Cashel, County Tipperary, Ireland, widow of Pat Duggan. Daniel became stepfather to Catherine's and Pat's children, Michael, John and Ellen, who later married Mississippi plantation owner Daniel C Doughty. Mr. O'Driscoll died in an accident in 1849 and is buried at Mt. Calvary Cemetery in Refugio.

Catherine and Daniel had two sons, Jeremiah (1838–1890) and Robert Sr (1841–1914), Clara's father. Upon Catherine's death in 1852, Ellen and Daniel Doughty sold the Mississippi plantation and moved to Refugio to raise the boys. Both Jeremiah and Robert Driscoll Sr. were Privates in the Refugio Home Guard Unit during the American Civil War. Jeremiah and Robert Sr. expanded their operations in Nueces County, Texas.

On April 2, 1881 Driscoll was born on Copano Bay in St. Mary's of Aransas in Refugio County, Texas. Clara's brother Robert Driscoll Jr. was born October 31, 1871, near Victoria. He died July 7, 1929.

=== Education ===
Clara was fluent in four languages and educated at private academies: Mrs. Gregory's School in San Antonio, Texas; Miss Peebles & Miss Thompson's School for Girls in New York City; and Château de Dieudonne, a finishing school in Bornel, France.

=== Writing career ===
In 1905, Clara published The Girl of La Gloria, and in 1906 she published In the Shadow of the Alamo.

The three-act comic opera Mexicana, was adapted from a book by Driscoll, and was financed by her. Music was by John Raymond Hubbell with lyrics by Clara Driscoll and Robert Bache Smith. The production ran at the Lyric Theatre (New York) for 82 performances, from January 29, 1906, to April 7, 1906. It was produced by Lee Shubert, Jacob J. Shubert and The Shubert Organization. Listed among her friends in attendance were both United States senators from Texas, Joseph W. Bailey and Charles Allen Culberson as well as three Texas members of the United States House of Representatives, James L. Slayden, Albert S. Burleson and John Nance Garner, who would become Vice President (1933–1941) under President Franklin Delano Roosevelt.

=== Marriage, Laguna Gloria and divorce ===
On July 31, 1906, Clara married Tennessee-born Henry Hulme Sevier in St. Patrick's Cathedral, New York. The couple honeymooned in Europe and settled in the Sevier villa on Long Island. When Robert Driscoll Sr. died in 1914, the Seviers returned to Texas to be involved in the Driscoll family business. In 1917, Hal Sevier founded the Austin American-Statesman.

Hal remembered his wife's fondness for Lake Como in Italy during their honeymoon, and sought to give her the Texas version. In August 1915, they bought 28 1/2 acres on Lake Austin at Mount Bonnell overlooking the Colorado River five miles (8 km) west of Austin. The land had originally been purchased by Stephen F. Austin who died before he could develop it. They chose the name Laguna Gloria, and Clara supervised the development of the estate and construction of the 15-room mansion, which became Clara's showplace for entertaining visitors from around the world.

In 1926, Driscoll wrote in the local magazine Gossip:

I have struggled to make this little home site...into a passably presentable garden of lawns and shrubs and flowers, intersected by paths and steps, with...glimpses and balustrades, and a few oil jars of ancient and accepted design. I have placed in...a proper setting a number of really beautiful and graceful statues which I was fortunate enough to obtain from one of the oldest and finest gardens in old Italy; this to give an Old World touch to an incomparably beautiful Texas landscape and to contribute a little dignity and formality to the riotous caprices of this violet-crowned vale.

From 1922 to 1926, university student Mary Lubbock Lasswell became a frequent visitor to Laguna Gloria. Mary described Clara as a magnetic personality with reddish-black hair and brown eyes, and who was "exceedingly outspoken". Lasswell remembered that both the Seviers were fond of Mexican and Spanish songs. Mary likened Clara to "an eagle among a flock of pouter pigeons".

Clara closed Laguna Gloria when her brother died in 1929 and the Seviers returned to the Palo Alto ranch headquarters. Clara managed the family's businesses and became president of Corpus Christi Bank and Trust Company.

In 1933, President Franklin Roosevelt appointed Hal Sevier as ambassador extraordinary and minister plenipotentiary to Chile. In 1935, the couple became legally separated. They never had any children. The couple divorced on July 7, 1937 and Clara resumed the use of her maiden name.

=== Saving the Alamo ===
Driscoll returned from Europe in 1898 and settled in San Antonio. She was alarmed at the state of the Alamo, stating her opinion in the San Antonio Express that "unsightly obstructions" near the Alamo should be removed to allow the Alamo to stand alone.

The public entrance known as the Alamo's mission chapel was already owned by the State of Texas, which had purchased the building from the Roman Catholic Church in 1883 and had given custody to the City of San Antonio. The city had made no improvements to the chapel structure and ownership did not include the long barracks (convento).

In 1903, Adina Emilia De Zavala enlisted Clara Driscoll to join the Daughters of the Republic of Texas and chair the De Zavala fundraising committee to negotiate the purchase of the long barracks that was owned by wholesale grocers Charles Hugo, Gustav Schmeltzer and William Heuermann. The asking price was $75,000, most of which came out of Clara Driscoll's bank account. On January 26, 1905, the state legislature approved and Governor S.W.T Lanham signed legislation for state funding to preserve the Alamo property. The state reimbursed Clara Driscoll and on October 4, 1905, the governor formally conveyed the Alamo property, including the convento and the mission church, to the Daughters of the Republic of Texas.

A divide between two factions erupted over how the long barracks property was to be used. Driscoll and others believed it was not part of the original structure and should be turned into a park. Clara offered to raze the building at her own expense. De Zavala was adamant that the long barracks was part of the original building and where the major part of the battle had occurred. In 1908, De Zavala had a stand-off with authorities inside the structure. By 1911, Governor Oscar Branch Colquitt ordered the long barracks be restored to its original condition as it was in mission days. During the 1912 restoration, workers discovered foundation work that verified De Zavala's instincts that the structure had indeed been an original part of the Alamo. However, Governor Colquitt was eventually unsuccessful in preserving the barracks building and when he was out of town on business Lieutenant Governor William Harding Mayes allowed for the further removal of the second floor of the structure.

Clara continued to work on behalf of the Alamo for the rest of her life. In 1931, she again put up $70,000 of her own money to help the state legislature purchase more city property surrounding the shrine. In 1933, she backed down city engineers who wanted to purchase a portion of the Alamo property to widen Houston Street. By 1935, the persuasive Driscoll talked the City of San Antonio Fire Department out of putting a new fire station adjacent to the Alamo. As president of the DRT in 1936, she oversaw Centennial celebrations of the shrine.

When Clara died in 1945, her body lay in state in the Alamo chapel.

=== Political involvement ===
Driscoll served as the Democratic party's national committeewoman from Texas 1922–1938 and supported her friend Nance Garner's 1940 bid for the Presidency. Garner's campaign cost $165,000. She continued to support Franklin D. Roosevelt after he was reelected.

Upon her death, Time magazine described Clara's political acumen:

Money Player. Politicians soon learned to respect her: she could drink, battle, cuss and connive with the best of them, outspend practically all of them. Uvalde's white-browed John Nance Garner became her great & good friend—in & out of smoke-filled rooms, they understood each other. She made quadrennial $25,000 donations to national campaigns, but know-how, not money, worked her up to national committeewoman.

=== Civic and philanthropic endeavors ===
Driscoll served as vice chairman of the Texas Centennial Exposition executive board.

In 1939, Clara donated $92,000 to the Texas Federation of Women's Clubs, which paid off all debts against their headquarters known as The Mansion. In response, committee workers declared October 4, 1939, as Clara Driscoll Day in Austin. There was a reception, candle lighting, and unveiling of a portrait titled "Clara Driscoll, Patriot" by Corpus Christi artist Roy Miller.

Clara built the Hotel Robert Driscoll, which opened on May 25, 1942, in Corpus Christi, to memorialize her brother. Clara maintained a penthouse suite in the hotel. The structure is now the Wells Fargo Building.

In 1943, Clara deeded Laguna Gloria and a $5,000 gift to Texas Fine Arts Association Holding Company.

== Memorials ==
A plaque in the Long Barrack at the Alamo in San Antonio honors Driscoll, with words from a resolution outlining her impact in preserving the Alamo from developers.

Two Texas Historical Markers honor Driscoll. Marker 6461 sits in front of the Texas Federation of Women’s Clubs building, at 2312 San Gabriel Avenue in Austin, erected in 1967 as part of the Outstanding Women of Texas series. Marker 1287, erected in 1978, is found at site of the Driscoll family mausoleum at the Alamo Masonic Cemetery in San Antonio.

== See also ==
- Alamo Mission in San Antonio
- Daughters of the Republic of Texas
- Adina Emilia De Zavala
