= Wendell Wise Mayes Jr. =

American businessman and philanthropist (1924–2021)

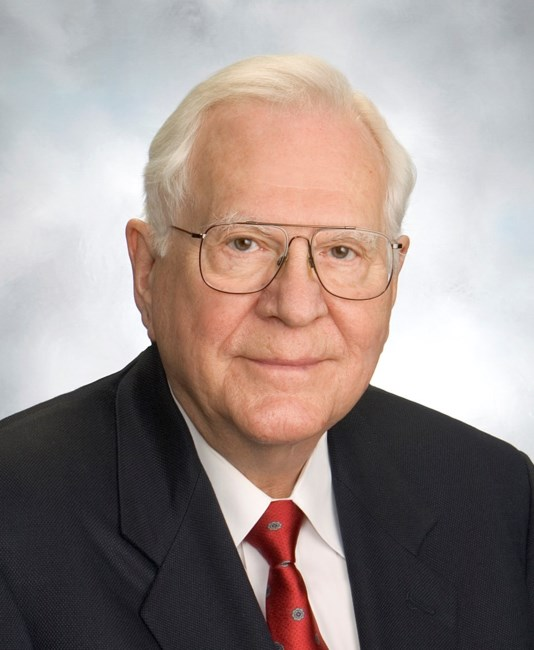
- Born: March 2, 1924; San Antonio, Texas, US
- Died: September 12, 2021 (aged 97); Austin, Texas, US
- Occupations: Philanthropist, businessman, executive, radioman
- Known for: Diabetes Philanthropy and Radio Journalism
- Spouse: Mary Jane King Mayes (1946–2021)
- Parent(s): Wendell Wise Mayes, Sr. Dorothy Evans Mayes

Wendell Wise Mayes Jr. (March 2, 1924 – September 12, 2021) was an American radio and cable television editorialist and executive in Austin, Texas, who was known for his leadership and philanthropy roles with the American Diabetes Association and the International Diabetes Federation, within the Texas Broadcasting Association, and for being a Peabody Awards winning journalist and editorialist.

The American Diabetes Association presents the Wendell Mayes Jr. Award for Lifetime Service, its highest award given to non-medical professional volunteers, to honor members for their lifetime achievement. He was the initial recipient of the award in 1986. Mayes was also a longtime supporter of education, earning five college degrees and establishing scholarships and awards at five higher education institutions in Texas.

== Early life, education and military ==
Mayes was the son of radio station owner Wendell Mayes and Dorothy Evans Mayes. His paternal grandfather was newspaperman William Harding Mayes, Lt. Governor of Texas from 1913 to 1914 and the founder of the journalism school and first Dean of Journalism at the University of Texas. Mayes was born on Texas Independence Day, March 2, 1924, in San Antonio, Texas. His early years were spent in Brownwood, Texas, where he graduated from high school. In 1941 he attended Schreiner Institute (now Schreiner University) in Kerrville, Texas, as a freshman. He transferred to the University of Texas at Austin in 1942, but he quit to enlist in the U. S. Navy for World War II.

Mayes was trained by the Navy as a radio and radar technician. He took a specialized course on the radar used on night fighter aircraft and was assigned to Fighting Squadron 3 aboard the USS Yorktown (CV-10), an aircraft carrier in the Pacific. He was serving on the Yorktown when the Third Fleet was caught in a typhoon in 1944 that sank three destroyers. His ship and squadron were awarded the Presidential Unit citation and four battle stars after participating in the campaign to retake the Philippines, the battle for Iwo Jima, the bombing of Saigon, the first full-scale air raids on Tokyo by carrier-based planes and several other battles. He was discharged from the Navy in March, 1946. In 2011 he was interviewed for the Veterans History Project of the Library of Congress.

After World War II ended, Mayes enrolled in Texas Technological College (now Texas Tech University) in Lubbock, Texas. Majoring in Electrical Engineering, he received a Bachelor of Science degree with Honors in May, 1949. While at Texas Tech he served as president of Tau Beta Pi, the engineering honor society. After retiring from a career in radio broadcasting, Mayes returned to school. He graduated summa cum laude from St. Edward's University in Austin with a Bachelor of Arts in Computer Science in 2002 at age 78. He went on to earn a Master of Liberal Arts degree in 2005 and a Master of Business Administration in 2006 from St. Edward's University. Continuing his education, Mayes received a Ph.D. in Applied Management and Decision Science from Walden University in May 2013.

Texas Tech University named Mayes a distinguished alumnus in 1981 and a distinguished engineer in 1985. In 1978 he was named to their Mass Communications Hall of Fame. He served as a member of the Texas Tech Board of Regents from 1985 to 1991, leading it as chairman from 1986 to 1988. Schreiner University in Kerrville named Mayes a distinguished alumnus in 2006. St. Edward's University presented him with the Distinguished Alumnus, MLA Program award in 2010. He received the Lifelong Learning Award from St. Edward's University in 2013. Mayes served as a Regent at Odessa Junior College in 1969-70 and as a Lecturer at the University of Texas at Austin 1978-80. Mayes and his family members have established scholarships at Texas Tech University, the University of Texas at Austin, Schreiner University, St. Edward's University and Texas Woman's University.

== Career ==
Mayes was a radio broadcasting and cable television executive for fifty years. He and his family owned radio stations in the Texas cities of Austin, Brownwood, Fort Worth, Midland, Snyder and Victoria and in Oklahoma City, Oklahoma. with controlling interests in Pioneer Broadcasting Company, Midland Broadcasting Company, and Independence Broadcasting Company. All were founded by his father, Wendell Mayes, and colloquially referred to as the "Wendell Mayes Stations" and operated jointly out of Austin, Texas. His cable interests were in Hereford, Corsicana, and Snyder, Texas, and Pauls Valley and Choctaw, Oklahoma. In 1973 he and his radio station KNOW, a member of the Pioneer Broadcasting Company, in Austin received the George Foster Peabody Award, one of the most prestigious awards in broadcasting, for programming, including editorials Mayes wrote and delivered on the civil rights and racial dynamics of drug law liberalization. Also in 1973, Mayes was responsible for creating and endowing the Texas Broadcast Education Foundation, the scholarship foundation associated with the Texas Association of Broadcasters.

He held leadership positions with the Texas Association of Broadcasters (President, 1964) and the National Association of Broadcasters (Director 1969-73, Vice-Chairman 1971-73). The Texas Association named him the 1978 Pioneer Broadcaster of the Year. The Texas Association of Broadcast Educators selected Mayes as Broadcaster of the Year in 1989 and honored him with a scholarship in his name with a dinner at the Texas Governor's Mansion in 2001. Other past business activities included the Brownwood Coca-Cola Bottling Company, the Del Rio Holiday Inn and directorships at Texas Commerce Bank, Austin, Citizens Savings and Loan, Midland and KLBJ AM-FM in Austin. Mayes was inducted into the Texas Radio Hall of Fame in 2002.

== Diabetes activities ==
Mayes became a volunteer working to improve the lives of people with diabetes when his son Wendell Mayes III was diagnosed with diabetes at age nine. He served as chairman of the American Diabetes Association from 1974 to 1977 and President of the International Diabetes Federation from 1991 to 1994, the first layperson to hold the position. The American Diabetes Association named its highest non-scientific award for Mayes and presented him with the first medal in 1986. The ADA also presented Mayes with the Charles H. Best Medal (1978), the Addison B. Scoville Award (1977), the Josiah Kirby Lilly Sr. Award (1991) and the Harold Rifkin Award (1994). In 1994 in Kobe, Japan, the Colloquium on Medical Science presented Mayes with the Masaji Takeda Medal. Mayes was honored by the American Diabetes Association Texas Affiliate in 1994 with a dinner in Dallas. When the State of Texas formed the Texas Diabetes Council in 1983, he served as its first chairman. For nine months in 1999 he returned to the Texas Diabetes Council to serve as its Interim Executive Director. He was the first inductee into the Texas Diabetes Hall of Fame.

== Personal life ==
Wendell Mayes Jr. married Mary Jane King in 1946 in Brownwood, Texas. They had three children, eight grandchildren, and eleven great-grandchildren. He was a member of the Good Shepherd Episcopal Church in Austin, where he has served as a Vestryman and Senior Warden. Mayes was also active in many civic organizations in Brownwood, Midland and Austin, including the American Field Service, the Chamber of Commerce, the Rotary Club and the Headliners Club. Mayes and his wife lived in Austin from 1970.

He died in September 2021, at the age of 97.
