= Texas Federation of Women's Clubs Headquarters =

- U.S. National Register of Historic Places
- Recorded Texas Historic Landmark
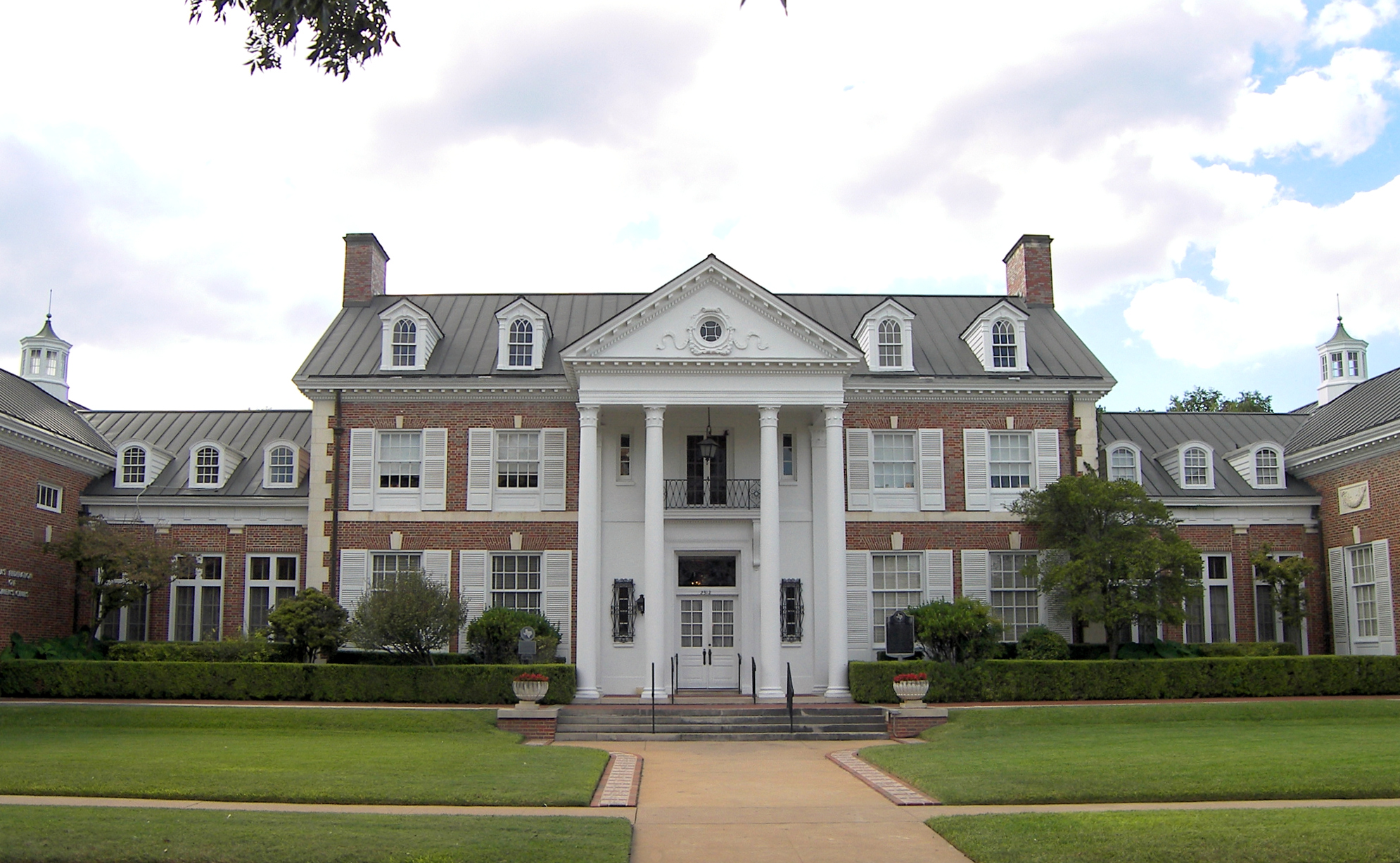
- The Texas Federation of Women's Clubs Headquarters in 2007
- Location: 2312 San Gabriel St. Austin, Texas, USA
- Coordinates: 30°17′16″N 97°44′53″W
- Built: 1931
- Architect: Henry Coke Knight
- Architectural style: Colonial Revival
- NRHP reference No.: 85003377
- RTHL No.: 6460

Significant dates
- Added to NRHP: October 24, 1985
- Designated RTHL: 1986

The Texas Federation of Women's Clubs Headquarters, now referred to as simply "The Mansion," or "The Fed," is a Georgian Revival mansion located on the southwest corner of 24th Street and San Gabriel Street in Austin, Texas, United States. The building was completed in 1931 to be the headquarters for the Texas Federation of Women's Clubs, with assistance from local philanthropist Clara Driscoll. It was designed by Dallas architect Henry Coke Knight.

The building sits adjacent to the historic Neill-Cochran House (1855) and is a prominent feature of the Judge's Hill neighborhood, to the west of the University of Texas.

The Mansion was added to the National Register of Historic Places on October 24, 1985. It is one of the best remaining examples of Georgian Revival architecture in Texas. Today it is mostly used to host weddings and receptions, though every Thursday night since 1999 the Austin Swing Syndicate holds a swing dance on the 4,000 sq ft (370 m^{2}) sprung polished oak floors of the Texas Federation of Women's Clubs Headquarters.
