= William Harding Mayes =

American politician (1861–1939)

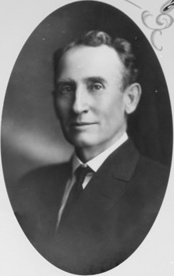

23rd Lieutenant Governor of Texas
- In office January 20, 1913 – August 14, 1914
- Governor: Oscar Branch Colquitt
- Preceded by: Asbury Bascom Davidson
- Succeeded by: William P. Hobby

Personal details
- Born: May 20, 1861 Mayfield, Kentucky, US
- Died: 26 June 1939 (aged 78) Austin, Texas, US
- Spouses: Jessie Wise (m. 1886; died 1899); Anna Marshall (m. 1900)
- Children: 7
- Education: Vanderbilt University

William Harding Mayes (May 20, 1861 – June 26, 1939) was an American politician, journalist, and educator who served as the 23rd lieutenant governor of Texas from 1913 to 1914. A member of the Democratic Party, Mayes was the publisher of the Brownwood Bulletin and the founder of the University of Texas journalism school.

== Early life ==
Born in Mayfield, Kentucky, Mayes was educated at Norton's English and Classical School in Tennessee, Paducah District Methodist College in Kentucky and Vanderbilt University, class of 1881, where he was a member of Phi Delta Theta. He practiced law in Kentucky in 1881 as a partner in the law firm Park and Mayes and in Texas from 1882 to 1886, serving as county attorney of Brown County, Texas from 1882 to 1883. He received an honorary doctorate of laws from Daniel Baker College in 1914.

Mayes purchased weekly newspapers in Brownwood, Texas in the 1880s and began the daily Brownwood Bulletin newspaper in 1900, which he published until 1914. He and his brother, H.F. Mayes, founded one of the earliest newspaper chains, owning Texas papers in Brady, Stephenville, Santa Anna, May, Ballinger and Dalhart. The Brownwood Bulletin was the first newspaper in Texas to not be officially linked to the state Democratic party, instead opting to be independently Democratic (supportive of the party in general, but critical when warranted).

== Politics ==
Mayes was elected Lieutenant Governor of Texas in 1912 despite not campaigning for the position. While Lt. Governor, Mayes played a notable role in the controversy surrounding the Daughters of the Republic of Texas' custodianship of the Alamo Mission in San Antonio, siding with Clara Driscoll over Adina De Zavala to demolish most of the remaining portions of the site's long barracks. He made this decision while governor Oscar Colquitt had left the state on business. This event became known as the "Second Battle of the Alamo." Historians Burroughs, Tomlinson, Stanford, in "Forget the Alamo" describe this event as the motivation for Clara Driscoll to found the Texas Historical Landmarks Association.

In September 1913, the University of Texas offered him a position as chair of an as-yet created School of Journalism. However, Mayes declined, and immediately thereafter announced he was running for the office of Governor on a platform of statewide prohibition and local option. He was initially considered to be a favorite, but withdrew after Thomas Ball consolidated prohibitionist support, who in turn lost the nomination to James E. Ferguson. Later in life he also served as executive vice president of the Texas Centennial Committee of 1936.

After failing to gain the Democratic nomination for Governor, Mayes resigned from office, founded, and became dean of the University of Texas School of Journalism at the insistence of University President and friend Sidney Edward Mezes.

== Journalism ==
Mayes founded the University of Texas School of Journalism in 1914 and was its dean until 1926. As dean, he founded The Texas Journalist, a student run newspaper. In 1916, he was one of seven faculty members targeted for firing by Texas governor James E. Ferguson, who found them objectionable.

The complaints against Mayes, who had been one of Ferguson's chief rivals for the 1914 Democratic gubernatorial nomination (he declined to run in favor of prohibitionist congressman Thomas Henry Ball), stemmed from negative editorials against Ferguson that the Brownwood Bulletin published while Mayes still owned half of the company. Ferguson was quoted saying that the Bulletin had "skinned me from hell to breakfast." However, Mayes maintained that he was out of the state when these editorials - editorials that were widely reprinted throughout the state in the ensuing controversy - were written and approved by others and that he no longer had a financial stake in the business dealings of the Bulletin. Although Mayes was exonerated by the board of regents, he was later dismissed by the university in 1917 in a 4–3 vote. However, the dismissal was reversed and he was fully reinstated as dean and Ferguson was eventually impeached by the Texas Legislature. Later, Governor Ma Ferguson succeeded where her husband had not, and was able to remove funding for the School of Journalism entirely, effectively abolishing its programs.

He served as president of the Texas Press Association in 1899–90 and was elected without opposition president of the National Editorial Association in 1908. He was elected vice-president of the American Association of Journalism Teachers in 1916 and president of the Association of American Schools and Departments of Journalism in 1920–21. After retiring from the school and from public life, he published a book entitled "Texas Empire Builders of 1936." In 1940, shortly after his death, the University of Texas acquired his 80-volume library on the history of journalism in Texas.

== Personal life ==
Mayes had seven children: four from Jessie Wise, whom he married in 1886, and three from his second wife, Anna Marshall, whom he married in 1900 after his first wife's death the year before. Mayes is buried in Greenleaf Cemetery in Brownwood.

His son William Harding Mayes Jr. was a print journalist who worked for the Brownwood Bulletin, was editor of the Ranger Times and Harlingen, Texas's The Valley Morning Star.

His son Wendell Wise Mayes was initially a print journalist, working for the Parlier Progress in Parlier, California and later for the Fresno Bee. He was later elected mayor of the Texas cities of Center (1925–1928) and Brownwood (1939–1951), where he owned and ran the KBWD radio station as part of a larger broadcasting chain. In 1939, he was appointed by Governor James V. Allred to serve on the executive committee of the Texas Big Bend Park Association, which created Big Bend National Park. He later served as chairman of the Texas State Parks Board, as a member of the Brown County Hospital Authority, and chairman of the board of regents of Texas Women's University. Dorothy Evans Mayes, wife of Wendell Wise Mayes, was a noted Texan artist. Howard Payne University's Department of Art's gallery is named in their memory. Their son, Wendell Wise Mayes Jr., was a prominent diabetes philanthropist and radio journalist who won a George Foster Peabody Award for broadcasting work he did on civil rights.

His daughter from his second marriage, Isabelle Mayes Hale, was a noted Texas artist. His son from his second marriage, Robert Chappell Mayes, was also a notable Texas journalist working in Edinburg, Texas at the Edinburg Review and served as news editor of the San Antonio Express-News until his retirement in 1977. Anna Elizabeth Morris Mayes, wife of Robert, was also a Texas journalist, working in Gonzales, Texas, Houston, and San Antonio.

Mayes was a descendant of the 1611 second settlement of Jamestown, Virginia. His direct male ancestor, William, was pastor at Kequoghton and played an instrumental role in the early development of the Virginia Company and its continuation after the massacre of over three hundred peaceful indigenous people on March 22, 1622, by directly engaging with King James I on its behalf.

Political offices
Preceded by Asbury Bascom Davidson	Lieutenant Governor of Texas; 1913–1914	Succeeded by William P. Hobby Sr.
