= Adina Emilia De Zavala =

American teacher and historical preservationist

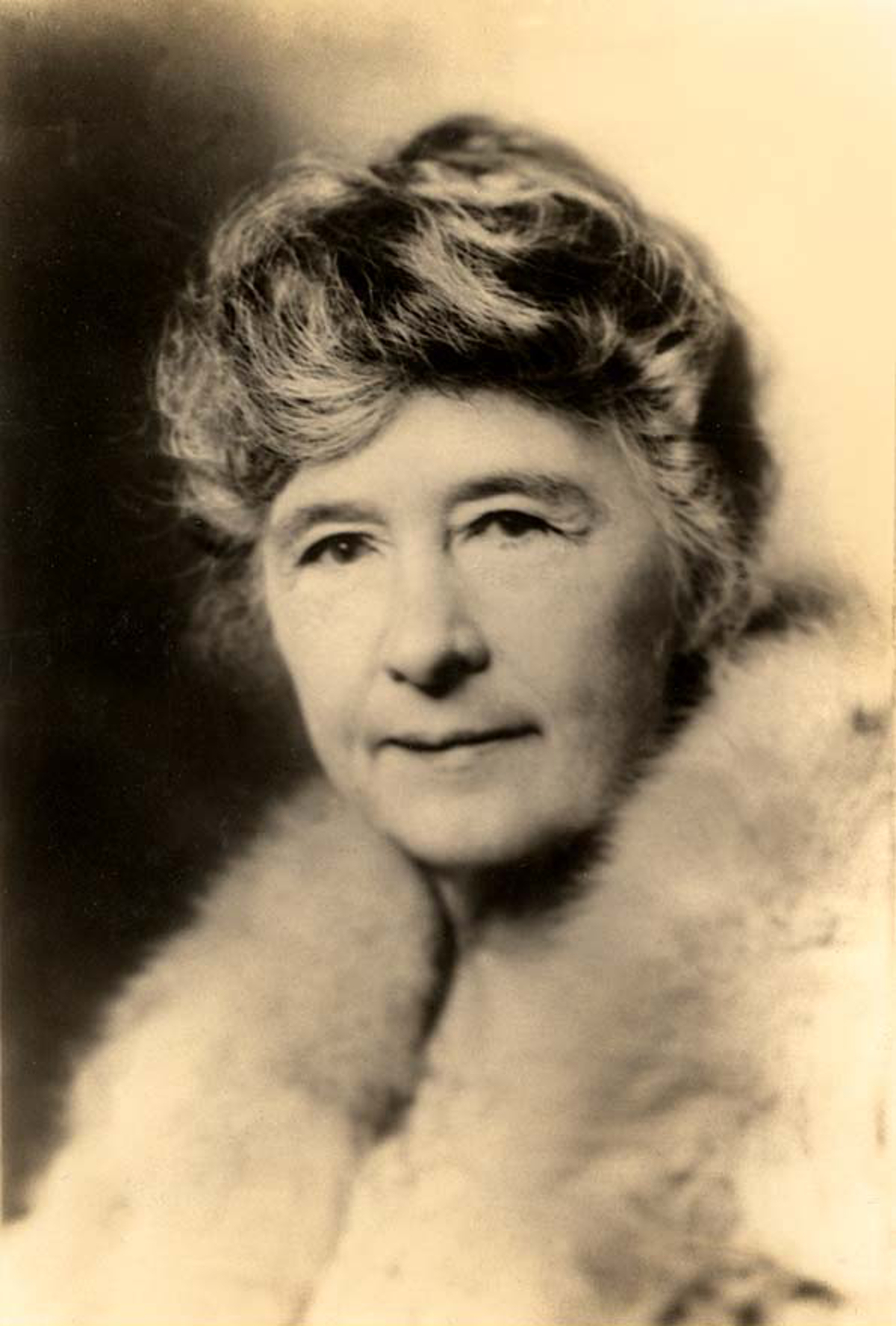
- Adina De Zavala, c. 1910
- Born: November 28, 1861; Harris County, Texas, US
- Died: March 1, 1955 (aged 93); San Antonio, Texas, US
- Occupations: Teacher; Historian; Preservationist
- Known for: Saving the Alamo Long Barrack Fortress

Adina Emilia De Zavala (November 28, 1861 – March 1, 1955) was an American teacher, historian and preservationist of Texas history. Her efforts led to saving the Alamo for future generations. She was born to Augustine De Zavala (originally de Zavala), son of Lorenzo de Zavala, the first Vice President of the Republic of Texas. Adina's mother Julia Tyrrell De Zavala was born in Ireland. In 1994, Recorded Texas Historic Landmark Marker number 86 was placed at Alamo Plaza to honor De Zavala. In 2008, Texas Historical marker number 15124 was placed in St. Mary's Cemetery to honor De Zavala's contributions to Texas.

== Family background and education ==
Adina's father Augustine De Zavala was the son of Lorenzo de Zavala, the first Vice President of the Republic of Texas. Augustine was a farmer who joined the Confederate States Navy. According to historian L. Robert Ables, Adina was a blue-eyed brunette Hispanic, about 5 feet 3 inches tall. Growing up in a mixed heritage household, she never learned to speak Spanish. Her mother Julia Tyrell De Zavala had been born in Ireland but educated in Texas. Augustine's mother, Adina's grandmother, was Emily West of New York. Emily outlived three husbands, giving Augustine two non-Tejano stepfathers, German immigrant Henry M. Fock and sawmill owner E.D. Hand. Circa 1873, the De Zavala family moved to near Locke Hill, 12 miles north of downtown San Antonio. Augustine, died in 1893 and Julia managed the family's property holdings while living with her children.

De Zavala related for a 1935 Holland's Magazine interview that history and mythology were favorite themes in her childhood books, and that she and her sister produced historical plays. She described herself as a "jealous lover of Texas history." Adina was home schooled until 1871 when she was enrolled in Ursuline Academy in Galveston. From 1879 to 1881, Adina was enrolled in Sam Houston Normal Institute (now Sam Houston State University) in Huntsville, Texas. She also received a music education from a school in Chillicothe, Missouri. Adina became a teacher in Terrell, Texas from 1884 to 1886. In 1887, she joined family members who had moved to San Antonio, where she taught at elementary schools until 1907, emphasizing education about Texas heritage.

== Career ==
Adina De Zavala was a prolific writer, of Texas history. In 1900, she wrote the playlet, The Six National Flags That Have Floated Over Texas, as an educational tool about the ethnic diversity in the state.

She authored History and Legends of the Alamo and Other Missions In and Around San Antonio in 1917, a perspective that highlights the role of women and other minorities in the history of both the Alamo and Texas. De Zavala's 1916 Legend of the First Christmas at the Alamo (The Margil Vine) relates the lore of the Franciscan friars and local Indians celebrating the birth of Jesus Christ in the year 1718. In 1934, Adina wrote In My Grandmother's Old Garden Where the Rose Reigned as Queen for the San Antonio Express, remembering all the beautiful flowers in her grandmother's garden, especially her grandmother's favorite, the rose, and encouraging readers to plant roses to commemorate the 1936 centennial celebration.

In 1951, she donated most of her large collection of documents pertaining to preservation and the De Zavala family history, to the University of Texas at Austin, where it is used today by scholars at The Dolph Briscoe Center for American History. The remainder of her papers were bequeathed to the University of the Incarnate Word in San Antonio, which houses the collection on the second floor of its library.

== Historical preservation affiliations ==
Adina De Zavala was a proponent of a March 2 statewide recognition of Texas Independence Day, and was instrumental in Texas public schools being named for state heroes. She was on the executive council of the Texas State Historical Association, and in 1945 was voted an honorary life fellow of the council.

De Zavala interested her schoolteacher friend Anna Ellis, one of the founders of the San Antonio Conservation Society, in restoring homes representative of the six governments that had flown flags over Texas: Spain, France, Mexico, the Republic of Texas, the United States, and the Confederate States of America. De Zavala worked in coordination with Anna Ellis, Elizabeth O. Graham and others in the society to help save the Spanish Governor's Palace and several other structures, including the cluster of houses once lived in by Texas Declaration of Independence signerJosé Antonio Navarro. On March 2, 1951, the San Antonio Conservation Society presented De Zavala with an award for "marking historic homes and sites."

Shortly after Adina came to San Antonio in 1887, she formed the "De Zavala Daughters" organization dedicated to preserving and marking Texas history. In 1893, the organization changed its name and became a chapter of the Daughters of the Republic of Texas (DRT).

In 1900, the De Zavala chapter formed Auxiliary, De Zavala Chapter, Daughters of the Republic of Texas for those who were not eligible to join the regular DRT. In 1910, the auxiliary legally severed itself from the DRT and became an independent organization, with chapters in Crockett, Refugio, New Braunfels, San Patricio and Goliad. Between 1922 and 1935, the association researched and marked 28 historic sites in San Antonio and 10 elsewhere in the state. The organization disbanded when De Zavala died in 1955.

== Saving the Alamo ==
A protest must be recorded here against the wanton mutilation of the sculpture of the Missions by thoughtless relic hunters. The shameful chipping of the beautiful carving has been going on for years.

— William Corner, 1890, San Antonio de Bexar-A Guide and History

By the late 1880s, the historic San Antonio missions were falling into disrepair and becoming subject to vandals. De Zavala's initial efforts were towards saving these historical structures, in particular the Mission San Antonio de Valero otherwise known as the Alamo. The public entrance known as the Alamo's mission chapel was already owned by the State of Texas, which had purchased the building from the Roman Catholic Church in 1883 and had given custody to the City of San Antonio. The city had made no improvements to the chapel structure, and ownership did not include the Long Barrack, which was owned by wholesale grocer Gustav Schmeltzer. Italian-born sculptor Pompeo Luigi Coppini of the Alamo Cenotaph fame, related that Adina, accompanied by Pompeo's wife Elizabeth di Barbieri Coppini, "went out every day with our horse and buggy, calling on all the merchants of the town for some contributions of bricks, lumber, cedar posts, or wire to repair fences. These articles, in lieu of money, were to be used in repairing all the missions, the chapel of the Alamo included."

The De Zavala chapter of the DRT in 1902 organized the Congress of Patriotism, with the aim of creating a "Texas Hall of Fame" museum in the Alamo Long Barrack (or convento). Adina and her group convinced Gustav Schmeltzer to give the historical society first option to buy the structure if it went up for sale. She was notified in 1903 that the owners were considering a sale to a hotel syndicate. De Zavala enlisted heiress and historical preservationist Clara Driscoll to put up financial backing for the purchase. On January 26, 1905, Governor S.W.T Lanham signed legislation for state funding to preserve the Alamo property. The state reimbursed Clara Driscoll and, on October 4, 1905, the governor formally conveyed the Alamo property, including the convento and the mission church, to the Daughters of the Republic of Texas.

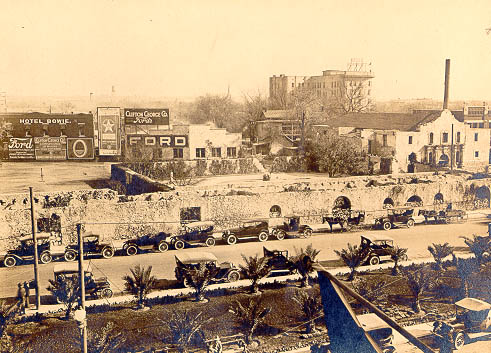
The Alamo and Downtown San Antonio c. 1920. In the center of the surrounding area are the remains of the "Long Barrack" which had been covered by the Hugo and Schmeltzer building

A divide erupted between two factions of the DRT, and the general public as well, over how the Long Barrack property was to be used. Driscoll and others believed it was not part of the original structure and should be turned into a park. De Zavala was convinced the property was where the major portion of the historic battle had taken place. In supporting research, Adina conducted numerous interviews with families and acquaintances of men who died in the Alamo. In 1906 she obtained an affidavit from Juan E. Barrera, a San Antonio resident born in 1839, stating that the Long Barrack "are still standing just as they were when I was a boy."

The building's lease was due to expire on February 10, 1908, and rumors floated that the property might next be rented to a vaudeville company. Two days before the expiration of the lease, Adina engaged three guards for the property and had a telephone installed in the rat-infested warehouse. New padlocks were also installed. On the evening of February 10, 1908, Sheriff John W. Tobin arrived with deputies in tow, an injunction barring De Zavala from interference, and assorted stakeholders of the outcome. The guards were served with the injunction and removed from the property. De Zavala refused to listen to the injunction and shut herself away in an upstairs area, without any provisions to sustain herself. While not trying to physically evict her, the sheriff had the electricity and telephone cut and threatened to send anyone to jail who brought her food. Nevertheless, both food and extra clothing were smuggled in, and law enforcement allowed water and coffee. Sheriff Tobin eventually had the electricity restored for lighting to keep the rats at bay. The 46-year-old Adina stated she was willing to die for the cause. The siege lasted three days and attracted spectators and newspaper coverage from around the country. Once her attorneys had worked out an agreement to temporarily turn the structure over to the governor, Adina emerged.

By 1911, Governor Oscar Branch Colquitt ordered the Long Barrack be restored to its original condition as it was in mission days. During the 1912 restoration, workers uncovered foundational work that verified De Zavala's instincts that the structure had indeed been an original part of the Alamo. However, when Governor Colquitt left the state on business in 1913, De Zavala's efforts were slighted when Lt Governor William Harding Mayes permitted the demolition of the upper-story walls of the Long Barrack.

== Death and recognitions ==
Adina died at age 93 on March 1, 1955. Her March 5 funeral was at St. Joseph Church in San Antonio, her casket draped with the flag of Texas. In tribute, she was carried past the Alamo one last time. De Zavala is buried in her family's plot in St. Mary's Cemetery. She never married and willed her estate to the Sisters of Charity of the Incarnate Word to establish a girl's vocational school and a boys town.

On April 27, 1955, the Texas State Legislature passed Senate Concurrent Resolution No. 51 paying tribute to her for playing "a major role in preserving the Alamo and the Spanish Governor's Palace" and for placing "permanent markers on some 40 historic sites in Texas, many of which might otherwise be forgotten."

In 1994 the Daughters of the Republic of Texas dedicated a special Commemorative Marker at her gravesite. The DRT Alamo Committee placed a bronze marker in the Alamo to commemorate both Adina De Zavala and Clara Driscoll. The Bexar County Historical Commission placed a State Historical Marker on city property in Alamo Plaza to honor De Zavala.

== See also ==
- Alamo Mission in San Antonio
- Spanish Governor's Palace
- Clara Driscoll (philanthropist)
