= San Antonio Fire Department =

Fire department in San Antonio, TX, US

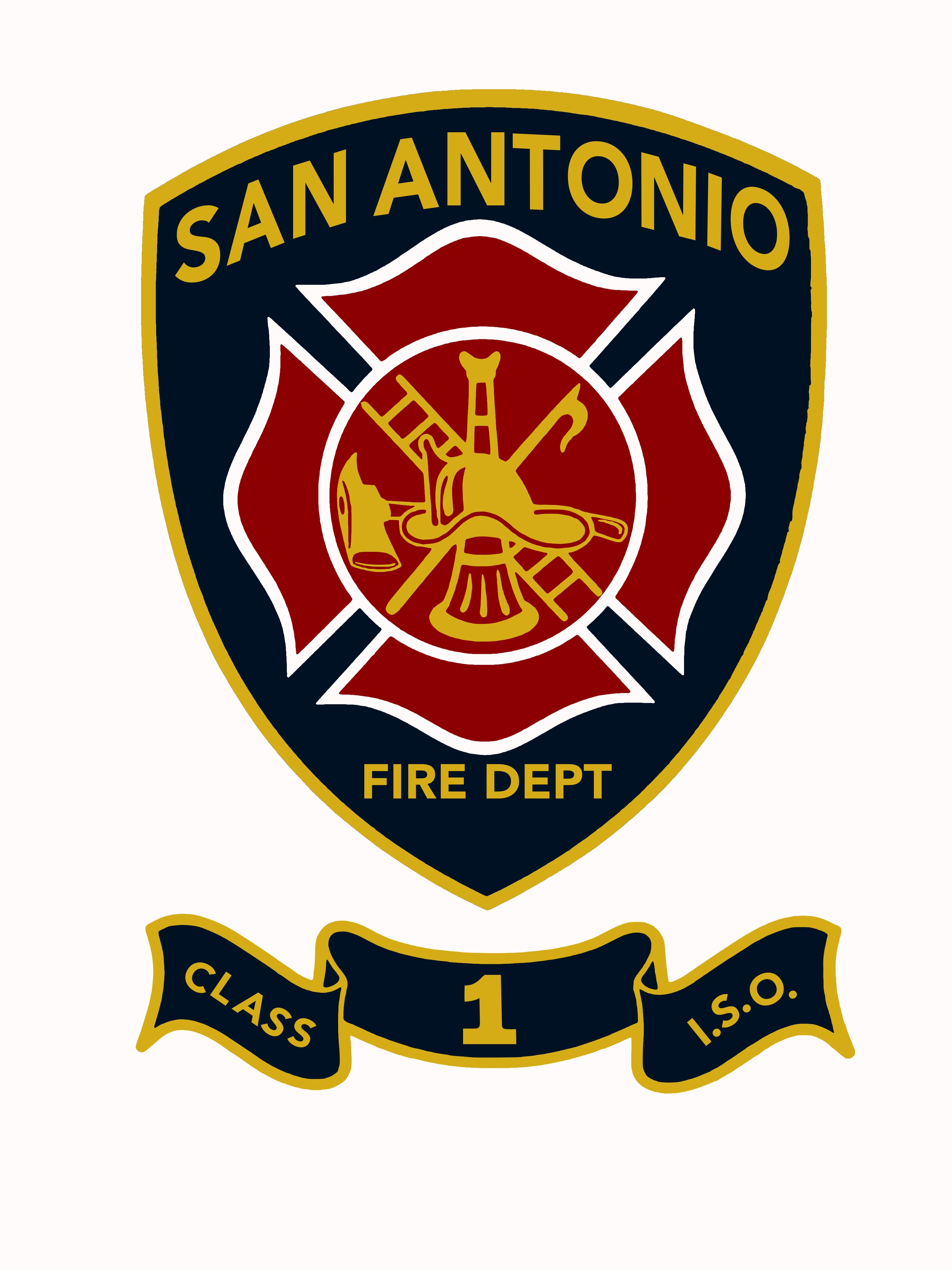
- SAFD CLASS 1 LOGO

Operational area
- Country: United States
- State: Texas
- City: San Antonio

Agency overview
- Established: June 6, 1854
- Annual calls: 203,309 (2019)
- Employees: ~1,800 (2019)
- Annual budget: $318,600,000 (2019)
- Staffing: Career
- Fire chief: Valerie Frausto
- EMS level: ALS
- IAFF: 624

Facilities and equipment
- Battalions: 8
- Stations: 54
- Engines: 54
- Trucks: 21
- Platforms: 10
- Squads: 22
- Rescues: 2
- Ambulances: 35
- Tenders: 4
- HAZMAT: 2
- Airport crash: 7
- Wildland: 11
- Rescue boats: 2
- Light and air: 4

Website
- Official website
- IAFF website

The San Antonio Fire Department provides fire protection and emergency medical services for the city of San Antonio, Texas. The department is the third largest fire department (by number of personnel) in the state of Texas. With over 1,800 members, the SAFD is responsible for a population of over 1.4 million people spread across 408 square miles (1,060 km^{2}).

The San Antonio Fire Department is an internationally accredited agency with the Commission on Fire Accreditation International (CFAI) and holds an Insurance Services Office (ISO) Public Protection Classification Class 1 rating. The department operates teams specializing in technical rescue, urban search and rescue, hazardous materials, aircraft rescue and firefighting, bike medics, incident management team, SWAT medic, and wildland firefighting among others.

The San Antonio Fire Department is also involved heavily with the FEMA Urban Search and Rescue Texas Task Force 1, abbreviated TX-TF1, to function as one of two state urban search and rescue (USAR) teams in the State of Texas. It is managed by the Texas A&M Engineering Extension Service in College Station, Texas.

== History ==
The department got its start on June 6, 1854, when a group of 20 San Antonians met to organize an all volunteer fire department. The company, initially called the Ben Milam Fire Company No. 1, consisted only of a bucket brigade. In 1856 the first hand pumped fire engine and hose real was purchased. On February 8, 1858, Fire Company No. 1 received its official charter from state naming it “The Fire Company of the City of San Antonio."

On December 22, 1859, the Alamo Fire Association No. 2 was placed in service after the Ben Milam Fire Company was deemed too small to handle major fires in city of greater than 8,000 residents. Fire Company No. 2 operated on the Eastside of the river. Alamo No. 2 was chartered by the state on February 11, 1860 and was the first fire company in the city to receive a horse dawn steamer.

During the American Civil War, fire protection was provided by slaves and the Confederate Army leading to the founding of the Colored Fire Companies in 1865 and 1866. Fire Company No. 3 and Fire Company No. 4 received zero funding from the city while providing fire protection to the city with nothing but hand pumps and buckets. Both fire companies were disbanded by 1881.

After the Civil War, a need for additional fire companies and capabilities was recognized. The San Antonio Turn Verein Athletic Club organized the 5th Fire Company which was charted the following year as the Turner Hook & Ladder Company.

Over the course of several years, fire companies continued to grow and new equipment began to be purchased. By 1873, the city funded horses and paid drivers to haul the steam pumper to the scene of fires. In the spring of 1878, the city officially founded the San Antonio Volunteer Fire Department.

As the city of San Antonio continued to expand and grow, so did the volunteer fire companies. During the early 1880s, three new fire companies were established. The first was the Second Ward Hose Company which was founded on April 14, 1883. The Sunset Hose Company No. 1 was established in early 1885 then on October 16, 1885, the Mission Hose Company No. 4 was formed.

In March 1891, the department transitioned to a paid department to keep up with the growing city. "San Antonio Fire Department History". MT Publishing. January 1, 2011. p. 128. ISBN 978-1-934-72960-1.

== Stations and apparatus ==
The San Antonio Fire Department operates out of 54 stations strategically placed across the city.

== Alarm assignments ==
=== Still alarms ===
A Still Alarm or more commonly called a Regular Alarm is the basic structure fire response protocol for the San Antonio Fire Department. The term "Still Alarm" came about upon the advent of telephones becoming more prevalent in reporting emergencies. The alarm office's register that received the signals from the actual fireboxes would remain "still" when someone reported a fire or emergency via telephone.The term is still used today out of tradition. A still alarm response is transmitted for most single family dwelling fires.

=== Box alarms ===
A Box Alarms or General Alarm is the other main assignment utilized by the San Antonio Fire Department. A Box Alarm is the standard protocol response for reported fires in high occupancy types, i.e. a hospital, nursing home, commercial building, strip mall, theater or other potentially high risk structure. If the fire is reported to have persons trapped or the Fire Alarm Office receives numerous calls for the same location, then an additional engine and truck are automatically added to the ticket by the Fire Alarm Office.

=== Multiple alarms ===
Higher-alarms for larger fires and more serious incidents are assigned as 2nd, 3rd, 4th, and 5th Alarm Assignments as upgrades of a "Still”, a "Box", or a "Working Fire". Each alarm level is signified by the level of alarms. The number "11" after the level of alarm is tradition of the bell and register system striking 11 blows onto the bell in the firehouse after whatever level of alarm the incident has been upgraded to, followed by the box number, that some have carried over into the modern era to continue the tradition.

=== Heat index ===
During the summer months and high heat days, the Fire Alarm Office will put out a citywide broadcast notifying all on duty personnel of the heat index level. Each level increases the response structure for the initial ticket and any subsequent alarm level at any working fires. During Level 1 heat index, work/rest cycles are implemented. During Level 2 heat index, an additional Engine Company, Truck Company and Battalion Chief are added. The increase in initial personnel is there to help with rehab and work/rest cycles.

== Notable incidents ==
February 18, 2021 – TPC Parkway Fire – 5th alarm fire at a five-story apartment building. SAFD responded mutual aid to assist the Bexar-Bulverde Fire Department. Fire crews were hampered by a lack of water due to the 2021 winter storms.

January 30, 2019 – Galm Road Rollover – First time low titer O + whole blood (LTOWB) was used successfully for a traumatic arrest in the field.

May 18, 2018 – Ingram Square Fire – 4th alarm fire in a CrossFit gym inside a strip mall that resulted in the Line of Duty Death of Firefighter Scott Deem and injured two other firefighters. The fire was ruled an arson fire.

November 5, 2017 – Sutherland Springs church shooting – STRAC EMTF-8 Ambus and Medical Task Force were deployed and responded to the church to assist with transportation. The Crisis Response Team also responded and provided peer support to the numerous responding agencies and families.

December 28, 2014 – Wedgewood Fire – 3rd Alarm fire at a high-rise senior living facility in Castle Hills, Texas. Five People were killed and 18 others injured after a fire broke out on the third floor. San Antonio Fire responded mutual aid to assist. A Medical Task Force was also dispatched to assist in relocating the dozens of rescued senior citizens.
