= Alamo Mission =

Fort in San Antonio, Texas, U.S.

The Alamo
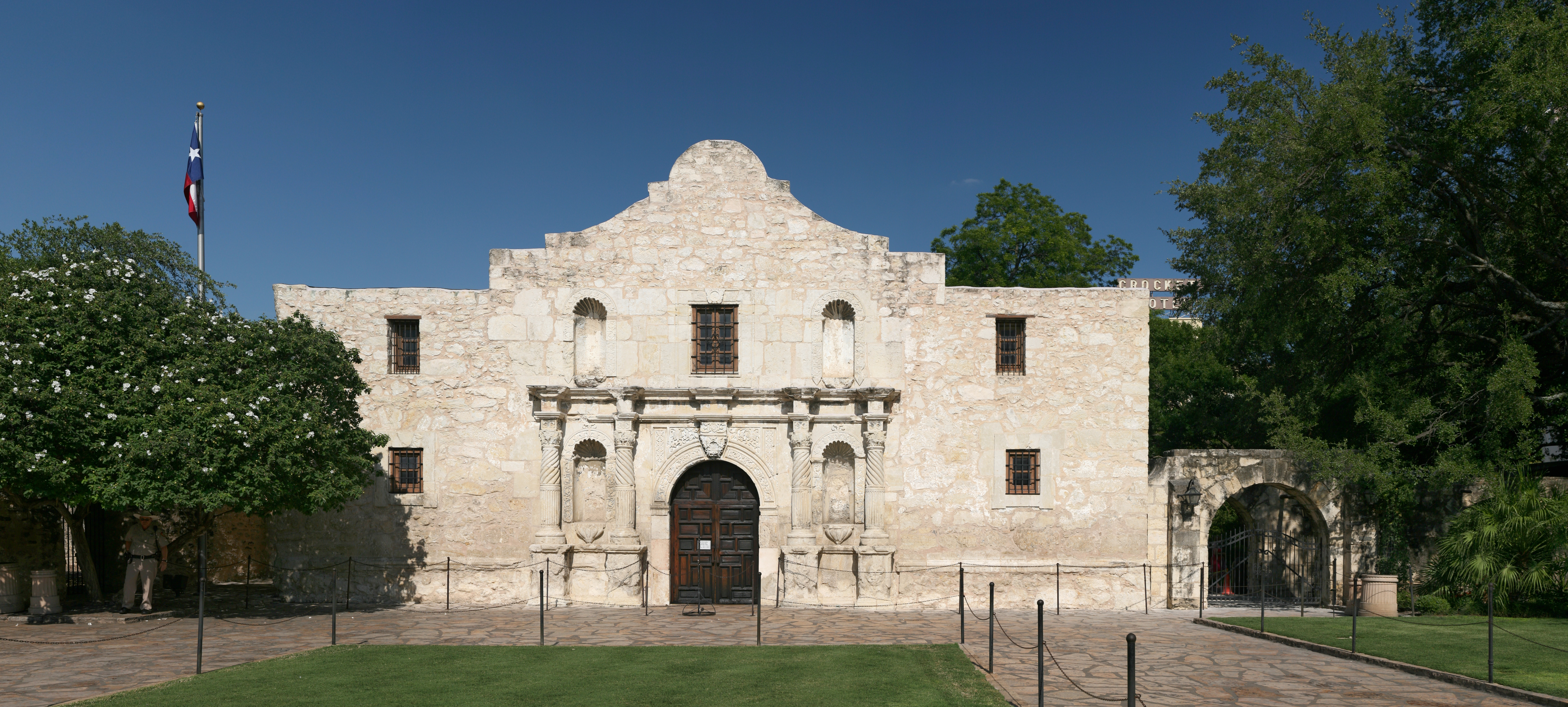
- The chapel of the Alamo Mission is known as the "Shrine of Texas Liberty"

- Location within Texas
- Location: 300 Alamo Plaza; San Antonio, Texas; U.S.
- Coordinates: 29°25′33″N 98°29′10″W
- Name as founded: Misión San Antonio de Valero
- English translation: Saint Anthony of Valero Mission
- Patron: Anthony of Padua
- Founded by: Antonio de San Buenaventura y Olivare
- Area: 5 acres (2.0 ha)
- Built: 1718
- Native tribe: Coahuiltecans
- Governing body: Texas General Land Office

UNESCO World Heritage Site
- Criteria: Cultural: (ii)
- Designated: 2015 (39th session)
- Part of: San Antonio Missions
- Reference no.: 1466-005
- State party: United States
- Region: Europe and North America

U.S. National Register of Historic Places
- Designated: October 15, 1966
- Reference no.: 66000808

U.S. National Historic Landmark
- Designated: December 19, 1960

U.S. Historic district – Contributing property
- Designated: July 13, 1977
- Part of: Alamo Plaza Historic District
- Reference no.: 77001425

Texas State Antiquities Landmark
- Designated: June 28, 1983
- Reference no.: 8200001755

Website
- www.thealamo.org

The Alamo is a historic Spanish mission and fortress compound founded in the 18th century by Catholic missionaries in what is now San Antonio, Texas, United States. It was the site of the Battle of the Alamo in 1836, a pivotal event of the Texas Revolution in which American folk heroes James Bowie and Davy Crockett were killed. Today it is a museum in the Alamo Plaza Historic District and a part of the San Antonio Missions World Heritage Site.

Originally named the Misión San Antonio de Valero, it was one of the early Spanish missions in Texas, built to convert American tribes to Christianity. The mission was secularized in 1793 and then abandoned. Ten years later, it became a fortress housing the Second Flying Company of San Carlos de Parras military unit; it is likely that this company gave the mission the name Alamo (Spanish for "cottonwood tree"). During the Texas Revolution, Mexican General Martín Perfecto de Cos surrendered the fort to the Texian Army in December 1835, following the Siege of Béxar. A relatively small number of Texian soldiers then occupied the compound for several months. The defenders were wiped out at the Battle of the Alamo on March 6, 1836. As the Mexican Army retreated from Texas several months later, they tore down many of the Alamo walls and burned some of the buildings.

For the next five years, the Alamo was periodically used to garrison soldiers, both Texian and Mexican, but was ultimately abandoned. In 1849, several years after Texas was annexed to the United States, the U.S. Army began renting the facility for use as a quartermaster's depot, before again abandoning the mission in 1876 after nearby Fort Sam Houston was established. The Alamo chapel was sold to the state of Texas, which conducted occasional tours but made no effort to restore it. The remaining buildings were sold to a mercantile company that operated them as a wholesale grocery store.

The Daughters of the Republic of Texas (DRT) formed in 1891, began trying to preserve the Alamo. Adina Emilia De Zavala and Clara Driscoll successfully convinced the state legislature in 1905 to purchase the remaining buildings and to name the DRT as the permanent custodian of the site. Over the next century, periodic attempts were made to transfer control of the Alamo from the DRT. In early 2015, Texas Land Commissioner George P. Bush officially moved control of the Alamo to the Texas General Land Office. The Alamo and the four missions in the San Antonio Missions National Historical Park were designated a UNESCO World Heritage Site on July 5, 2015.

== History ==
=== As a mission ===
In 1716, the Spanish government established several Roman Catholic missions in East Texas. The isolation of the missions—the nearest Spanish settlement, San Juan Bautista, Coahuila was over 400 miles (644 km) away—made it difficult to keep them adequately provisioned. To assist the missionaries, the new governor of Spanish Texas, Martín de Alarcón, wished to establish a waystation between the settlements along the Rio Grande and the new missions in East Texas.

In April 1718, Alarcón led an expedition to found a new community in Texas. The group erected a temporary mud, brush, and straw structure near the headwaters of the San Antonio River. This building would serve as a new mission, San Antonio de Valero, named after Saint Anthony of Padua and the viceroy of New Spain, the Marquess of Valero. Alarcón, acting in his capacity as "General of the Provinces of the Kingdom of the New Philippines," formally entrusted the mission on May 1 to Father Antonio de San Buenaventura y Olivares in a foundation document, still preserved. The mission was located near a community of Coahuiltecans and was initially populated by three to five Indian converts from Mission San Francisco Solano near San Juan Bautista. One mile (two km) north of the mission, Alarcón built a fort, the Presidio San Antonio de Béxar. Close by, he founded the first civilian community in Texas, San Antonio de Béxar, which later developed into the present-day city of San Antonio, Texas.

Within a year, the mission moved to the western bank of the river, where it was less likely to flood. Over the next several years, a chain of missions was established nearby. In 1724, after remnants of a Gulf Coast hurricane destroyed the existing structures at Misión San Antonio de Valero, the mission was moved to its current location. At the time, the new location was just across the San Antonio River from the town of San Antonio de Béxar and just north of a group of huts known as La Villita.

Over the next several decades, the mission complex expanded to cover 3 acres (1.2 ha). The first permanent building was likely the two-story, L-shaped stone residence for the priests. The building served as parts of the west and south edges of an inner courtyard. A series of adobe barracks buildings were constructed to house the mission Indians and a textile workshop was erected. By 1744, over 300 Indian converts resided at San Antonio de Valero. The mission was largely self-sufficient, relying on its 2,000 head of cattle and 1,300 sheep for food and clothing. Each year, the mission's farmland produced up to 2,000 bushels of corn and 100 bushels of beans; cotton was also grown.

The first stones were laid for a more permanent church building in 1744, however, the church, its tower, and the sacristy collapsed in the late 1750s. Reconstruction began in 1758, with the new chapel located at the south end of the inner courtyard. Constructed of 4-foot (1.2 m) thick limestone blocks excavated from a site later occupied by the San Antonio Zoo, it was intended to be three stories high and topped by a dome, with bell towers on either side. Its shape was a traditional cross, with a long nave and short transepts. Although the first two levels were completed, the bell towers and third story were never begun. While four stone arches were erected to support the planned dome, the dome itself was never built. As the church was never completed, it is unlikely that it was ever used for religious services.

The chapel was intended to be highly decorated. Niches were carved on either side of the door to hold statues. The lower-level niches displayed Saint Francis and Saint Dominic, while the second-level niches contained statues of Saint Clare and Saint Margaret of Cortona. Carvings were also completed around the chapel's door.

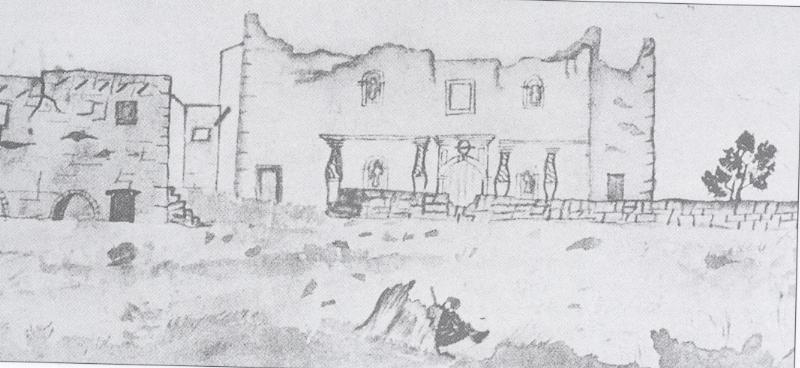
This is one of the first drawings depicting the Misión San Antonio de Valero. It was created in 1838 by Mary Maverick and shows statues within the niches.

Up to 30 adobe or mud buildings were constructed to serve as workrooms, storerooms, and homes for the Indian residents. As the nearby presidio was perpetually understaffed, the mission was built to withstand attacks by Apache and Comanche raiders. In 1745, 100 mission Indians successfully drove off a band of 300 Apaches which had surrounded the presidio. Their actions saved the presidio, the mission, and likely the town from destruction. Walls were erected around the Indian homes in 1758, likely in response to a massacre at the Mission Santa Cruz de San Sabá. The convent and church were not fully enclosed within the 8-foot (2.4 m) high walls. The walls were built 2 feet (60 cm) thick and enclosed an area 480 feet (150 m) long (north-south) and 160 feet (49 m) wide (east-west). For additional protection, a turret housing three cannon was added near the main gate in 1762. By 1793, an additional one-pounder cannon had been placed on a rampart near the convent.

The population of Indians fluctuated from a high of 328 in 1756 to a low of 44 in 1777. The new commandant general of the interior provinces, Teodoro de Croix, thought the missions were a liability and began taking actions to decrease their influence. In 1778, he ruled that all unbranded cattle belonged to the government. Raiding Apache tribes had stolen most of the mission's horses, making it difficult to round up and brand the cattle. As a result, when the ruling took effect, the mission lost a great deal of its wealth and was unable to support a larger population of converts. By 1793, only 12 Indians remained. (Note: Mason lists the number as 52. Mason (1974), p. 56.) By this point, few of the hunting and gathering tribes in Texas had not been Christianized. In 1793, Misión San Antonio de Valero was secularized.

Shortly after, the mission was abandoned. Most locals were uninterested in the buildings. Visitors were often more impressed. In 1828, French naturalist Jean Louis Berlandier visited the area. He mentioned the Alamo complex: "An enormous battlement and some barracks are found there, as well as the ruins of a church which could pass for one of the loveliest monuments of the area, even if its architecture is overloaded with ornamentation like all the ecclesiastical buildings of the Spanish colonies."

=== Military ===
In the 19th century, the mission complex became known as "the Alamo". The name may have been derived from a grove of nearby cottonwood trees, known in Spanish as álamo. Alternatively, in 1803, the abandoned compound was occupied by the Second Flying Company of San Carlos de Parras, from Álamo de Parras in Coahuila. Locals often called them simply the "Alamo Company".

During the Mexican War of Independence, parts of the mission frequently served as a political prison. Between 1806 and 1812 it served as San Antonio's first hospital. Spanish records indicate that some renovations were made for this purpose, but no details were provided.

The buildings were transferred from Spanish to Mexican control in 1821 after Mexico gained its independence. Soldiers continued to garrison the complex until December 1835, when General Martín Perfecto de Cos surrendered to Texian forces following a two-month siege of San Antonio de Béxar during the Texas Revolution. In the few months that Cos supervised the troops garrisoned in San Antonio, he had ordered many improvements to the Alamo. Cos's men likely demolished the four stone arches that were to support a future chapel dome. The debris from these was used to build a ramp to the apse of the chapel building. There, the Mexican soldiers placed three cannon, which could fire over the walls of the roofless building. To close a gap between the church and the barracks (formerly the convent building) and the south wall, the soldiers built a palisade. When Cos retreated, he left behind 19 cannons, including a 16-pounder.

==== Battle of the Alamo ====
"You can plainly see that the Alamo never was built by a military people for a fortress."

— Letter, dated January 18, 1836, from engineer Green B. Jameson to Sam Houston, commander of the Texian forces.

With Cos's departure, there was no longer an organized garrison of Mexican troops in Texas, and many Texians believed the war was over. Colonel James C. Neill assumed command of the 100 soldiers who remained. Neill requested that an additional 200 men be sent to fortify the Alamo, and expressed fear that his garrison could be starved out of the Alamo after a four-day siege. However, the Texian government was in turmoil and unable to provide much assistance. Determined to make the best of the situation, Neill and engineer Green B. Jameson began working to fortify the Alamo. Jameson installed the cannons that Cos had left along the walls.

Heeding Neill's warnings, General Sam Houston ordered Colonel James Bowie to take 35–50 men to Béxar to help Neill move all of the artillery and destroy the fortress. There were not enough oxen to move the artillery to a safer place, and most of the men believed the complex was of strategic importance to protecting the settlements to the east. On January 26, the Texian soldiers passed a resolution in favor of holding the Alamo. On February 11, Neill went on furlough to pursue additional reinforcements and supplies for the garrison. William Travis and James Bowie agreed to share command of the Alamo.

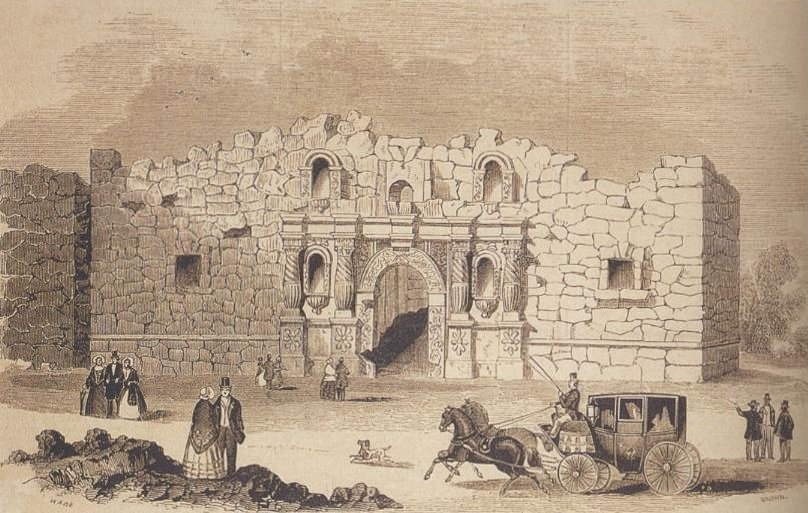
1854 drawing – The Alamo chapel would have looked something like this in the 1830s

On February 23, 1836, the Mexican Army, under the command of President-General Antonio López de Santa Anna, arrived in San Antonio de Béxar intent on recapturing the city. For the next thirteen days, the Mexican Army laid siege to the Alamo, during which work continued on its interior. After Mexican soldiers tried to block the irrigation ditch leading into the fort, Jameson supervised the digging of a well at the south end of the plaza. Although the men hit the water, they weakened an earth and timber parapet near the barracks, collapsing it and leaving no way to fire safely over that wall.

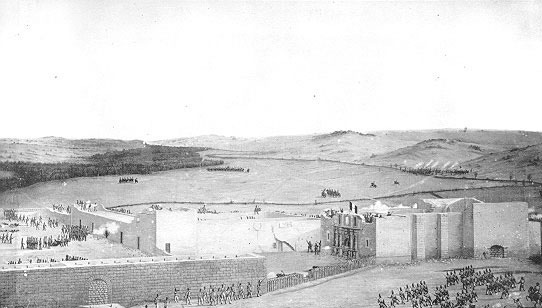
The Fall of the Alamo, painted by Theodore Gentilz in 1844, depicts the final assault

The siege ended in a fierce battle on March 6. As the Mexican Army overran the walls, most of the Texians fell back to the long barracks (convent) and the chapel. During the siege, Texians had carved holes in many of the walls of these rooms so that they would be able to fire. Each room had only one door which led into the courtyard and which had been "buttressed by semicircular parapets of dirt secured with cowhides". Some of the rooms even had trenches dug into the floor to provide some cover for the defenders. Mexican soldiers used the abandoned Texian cannon to blow off the doors of the rooms, allowing Mexican soldiers to enter and defeat the Texians.

The last of the Texians to die were the eleven men manning the two 12 lb (5.4 kg) cannon in the chapel. The entrance to the church had been barricaded with sandbags, which the Texians were able to fire over. A shot from the 18 lb (8.2 kg) cannon destroyed the barricades, and Mexican soldiers entered the building after firing an initial musket volley. With no time to reload, the Texians, including Dickinson, Gregorio Esparza, and Bonham, grabbed rifles and fired before being bayoneted to death. Texian Robert Evans was master of ordnance and had been tasked with keeping the gunpowder from falling into Mexican hands. Wounded, he crawled towards the powder magazine but was killed by a musket ball with his torch only inches from the powder. If he had succeeded, the blast would have destroyed the church.

Santa Anna ordered that the Texian bodies be stacked and burned. (Note: The only exception was the body of Gregorio Esparza, whose brother, Francisco Esparza, served in Santa Anna's army and received permission to give Gregorio a proper burial. Edmondson (2000), p. 374.) All, or almost all, of the Texian defenders were killed in the battle, although some historians believe that at least one Texian, Henry Warnell, successfully escaped. Warnell died several months later of wounds incurred either during the final battle or during his escape. Most Alamo historians agree that 400–600 Mexicans were killed or wounded. This would represent about one-third of the Mexican soldiers involved in the final assault, which historian Terry Todish stated was "a tremendous casualty rate by any standards".

==== Further military use ====
Following the battle of the Alamo, one thousand Mexican soldiers, under General Juan Andrade, remained at the mission. For the next two months, they repaired and fortified the complex, however, no records remain of what improvements they made to the structure. After the Mexican army's defeat at the Battle of San Jacinto and the capture of Santa Anna, the Mexican army agreed to leave Texas, effectively ending the Texas Revolution. As Andrade and his garrison joined the retreat on May 24, they spiked the cannons, tore down many of the Alamo walls, and set fires throughout the complex. Only a few buildings survived their efforts; the chapel was left in ruins, most of the Long Barracks was still standing, and the building that had contained the south wall gate and several rooms were mostly intact.

The Texians briefly used the Alamo as a fortress in December 1836 and again in January 1839. The Mexican army regained control in March 1841 and September 1842 as they briefly took San Antonio de Bexar. According to historians Roberts and Olson, "both groups carved names in the Alamo's walls, dug musket rounds out of the holds, and knocked off stone carvings". Pieces of the debris were sold to tourists, and in 1840 the San Antonio town council passed a resolution allowing local citizens to take stone from the Alamo at a cost of $5 per wagonload. By the late 1840s, even the four statues located on the front wall of the chapel had been removed.

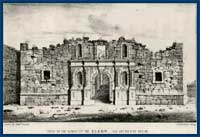
Drawing of the Alamo Mission, published 1846

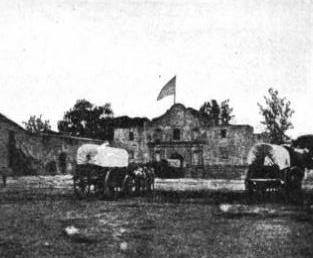
Alamo Plaza in the 1860s

On January 13, 1841, the Republic of Texas legislature passed an act returning the sanctuary of the Alamo to the Roman Catholic Church. By 1845, when Texas was annexed to the United States, a colony of bats occupied the abandoned complex and weeds and grass covered many of the walls.

As the Mexican–American War loomed in 1846, 2000 United States Army soldiers were sent to San Antonio under Brigadier General John Wool. By the end of the year, they had appropriated part of the Alamo complex for the Quartermaster's Department. Within eighteen months, the convent building had been restored to serve as offices and storerooms. The chapel remained vacant, however, as the army, the Roman Catholic Church, and the city of San Antonio bickered over its ownership. An 1855 decision by the Texas Supreme Court reaffirmed that the Catholic Church was the rightful owner of the chapel. While litigation was ongoing, the army rented the chapel from the Catholic Church for $150 per month.

Under the army's oversight, the Alamo was greatly repaired. Soldiers cleared the grounds and rebuilt the old convent and the mission walls, primarily from the original stone which was strewn along the ground. During the renovations, a new wooden roof was added to the chapel and the campanulate, or bell-shaped facade, was added to the front wall of the chapel. At the time, reports suggested that the soldiers found several skeletons while clearing the rubble from the chapel floor. The new chapel roof was destroyed in a fire in 1861. The army also cut additional windows into the chapel, adding two on the upper level of the facade as well as additional windows on the other three sides of the building. The complex eventually contained a supply depot, offices, storage facilities, a blacksmith shop, and stables.

During the American Civil War, Texas joined the Confederacy, and the Alamo complex was taken over by the Confederate Army. In February 1861, the Texan Militia, under direction from the Texas Secession Convention and led by Ben McCullough and Sam Maverick, confronted General Twiggs, commander of all US Forces in Texas and headquartered at the Alamo. Twiggs elected to surrender and all supplies were turned over to the Texans. Following the Confederacy's defeat, the United States Army again maintained control over the Alamo. Shortly after the war ended, however, the Catholic Church requested that the army vacate the premises so that the Alamo could become a place of worship for local German Catholics. The army refused, and the church made no further attempts at retaking the complex.

=== Mercantile ===
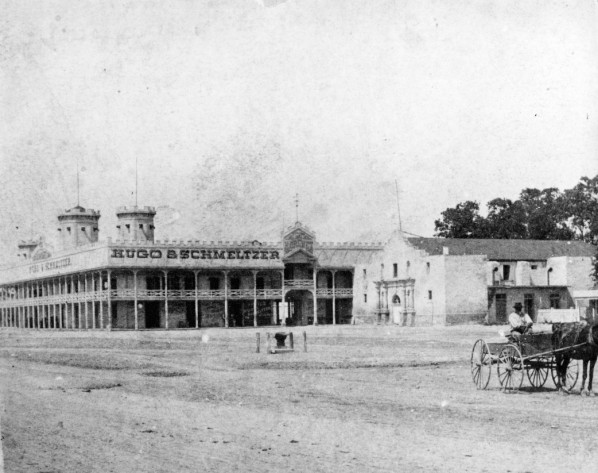
Mercantile firm Hugo & Schmeltzer operated a store on the site in the 1880s

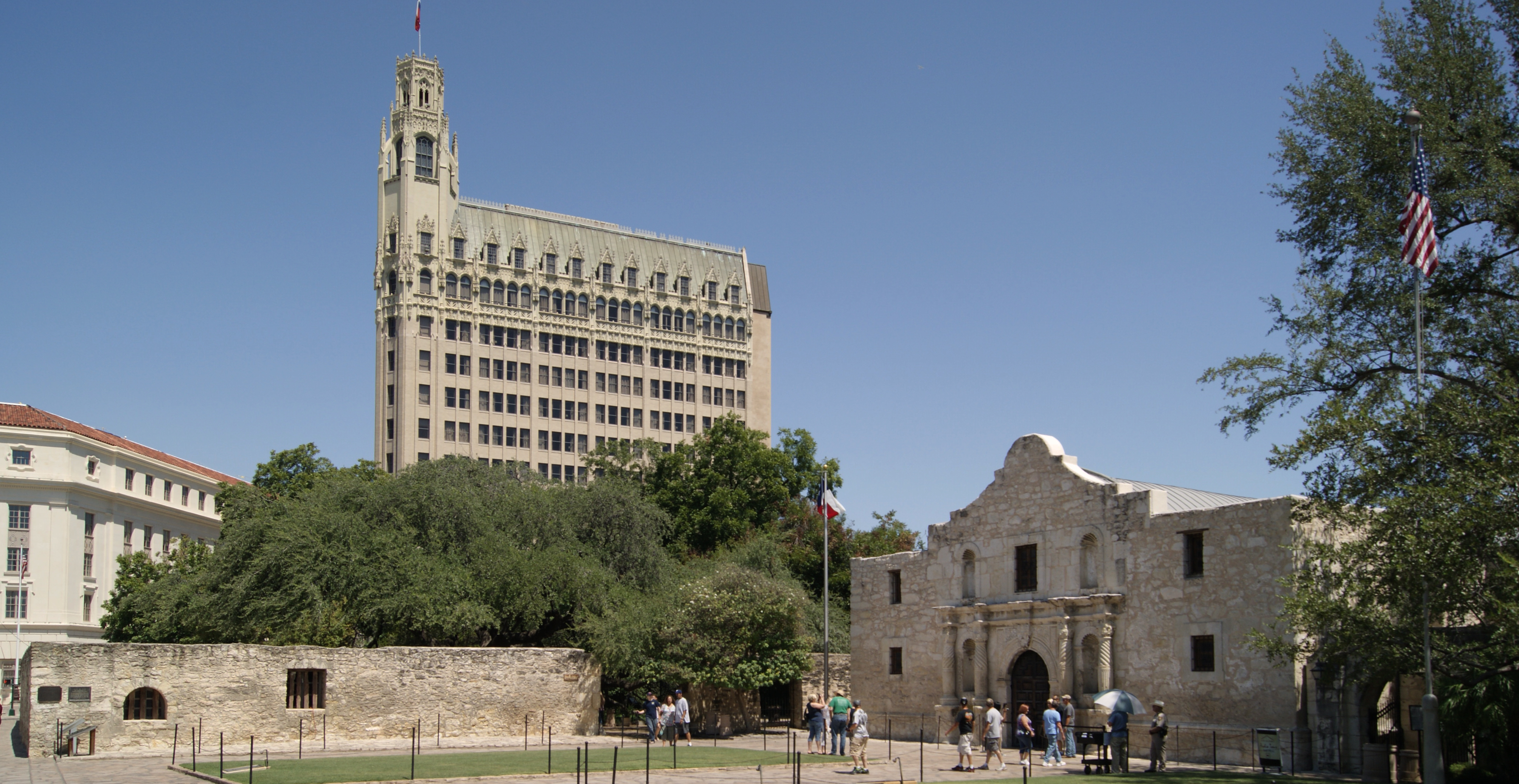
2011 view of the Alamo and surrounding area

They abandoned the Alamo in 1876 when Fort Sam Houston was established in San Antonio. About that time, the Church sold the convent to Honore Grenet, who added a new two-story wood building to the complex. Grenet used the convent and the new building for a wholesale grocery business. After Grenet's death in 1882, his business was purchased by the mercantile firm, Hugo & Schmeltzer, which continued to operate the store.

San Antonio's first rail service began in 1877, and the city's tourism industry began to grow. The city heavily advertised the Alamo, using photographs and drawings that showed only the chapel, not the surrounding city. Many of the visitors were disappointed with their visit; in 1877 tourist Harrier P. Spofford wrote that the chapel was "a reproach to all San Antonio. Its wall is overthrown and removed, its dormitories are piled with military stores, its battle-scarred front has been revamped and repainted and market carts roll to and fro on the spot where flames ascended ... over the funeral pyre of heroes".

=== Ownership transfer ===
In 1883, the Catholic Church sold the chapel to the State of Texas for $20,000. The state hired Tom Rife to manage the building. He gave tours but did not make any efforts to restore the chapel, to the annoyance of many. In the past decades, soldiers and members of the local Masonic lodge, which had used the building for meetings, had inscribed various graffiti on the walls and statues. In May 1887 a devout Catholic who was incensed that Masonic emblems had been inscribed on a statue of Saint Teresa was arrested after breaking into the building and smashing statues with a sledgehammer.

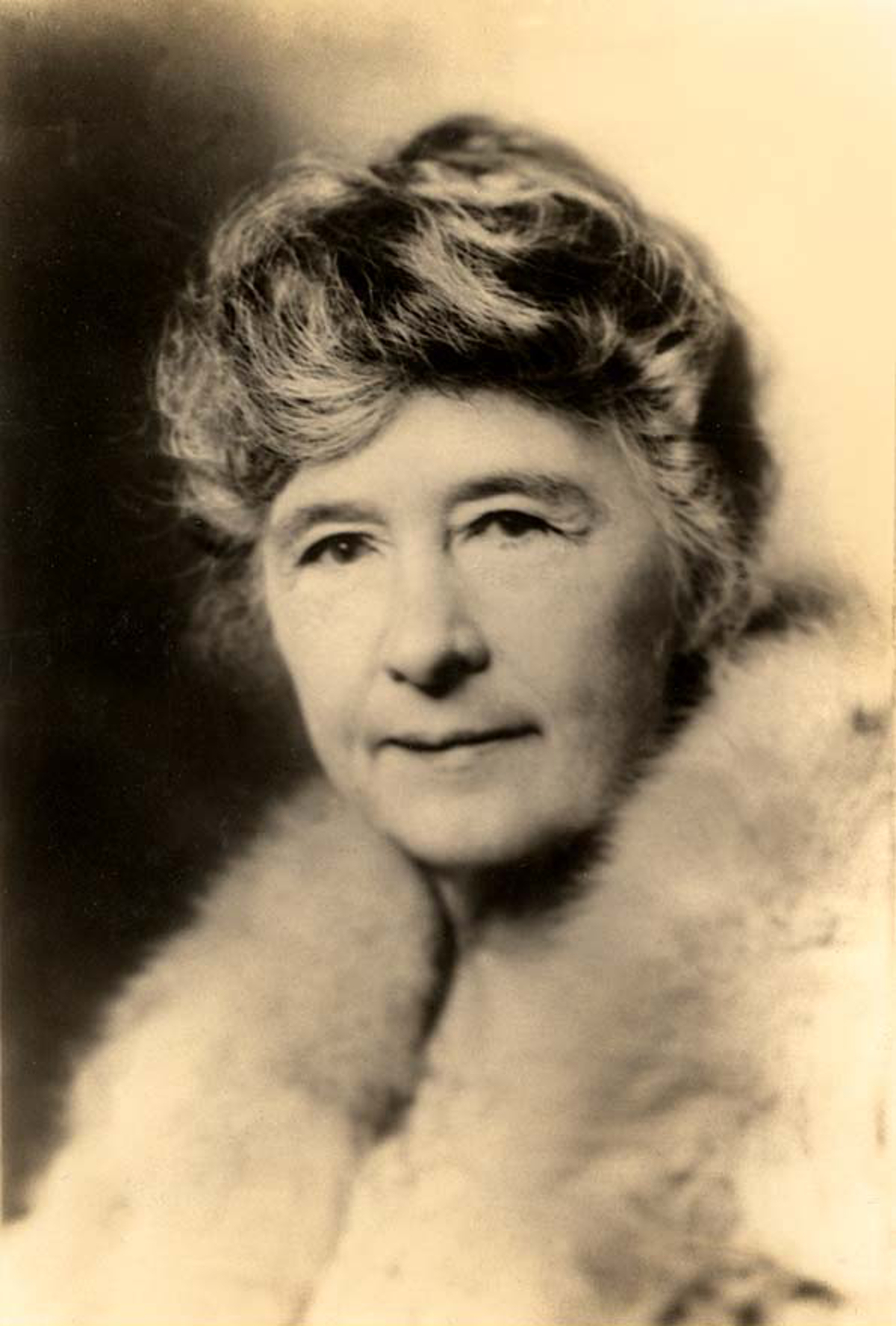
Adina De Zavala

The 50th anniversary of the fall of the Alamo received little attention. In an editorial after the fact, the San Antonio Express called for the formation of a new society that would help recognize important historical events. The Daughters of the Republic of Texas (DRT) organized in 1892 with one of their main goals being to preserve the Alamo. Among its early members was Adina Emilia De Zavala, granddaughter of the Republic of Texas Vice-president Lorenzo de Zavala. Shortly before the turn of the 20th century, Adina de Zavala convinced Gustav Schmeltzer, owner of the convent, to give the DRT first option in purchasing the building if it was ever sold. In 1903, when Schmeltzer wanted to sell the building to a developer, he offered the building first to the DRT for $75,000, which they did not have. During De Zavala's attempts to raise the money, she met Clara Driscoll, an heiress who was very interested in Texas history, especially the Alamo.

Clara Driscoll in 1903

Shortly thereafter, Driscoll joined the DRT and was appointed chair of the San Antonio chapter's fund-raising committee. The DRT negotiated a 30-day option on the property, wherein the group would pay $500 up front, with $4,500 due at the conclusion of the 30 days, with an additional $20,000 due on February 10, 1904, and the remainder paid in five annual installments of $10,000. Driscoll paid the initial $500 deposit out of her personal funds, and when fundraising efforts fell far short (only raising $1,021.75 of the needed $4,500), Driscoll paid the remaining balance from her own pocket.

At the urging of both Driscoll and de Zavala, the Texas Legislature approved $5,000 for the committee to use as part of the next payment. The appropriation was vetoed by Governor S. W. T. Lanham, who said it was "not a justifiable expenditure of the taxpayers' money". DRT members set up a collection booth outside the Alamo and held several fundraising activities, collecting $5,662.23. Driscoll agreed to make up the difference, as well as agreeing to pay the final $50,000. After hearing of her generosity, various newspapers in Texas dubbed her the "Savior of the Alamo". Many groups began to petition the legislature to reimburse Driscoll. In January 1905, de Zavala drafted a bill that was sponsored by representative Samuel Ealy Johnson Jr. (father of future US President Lyndon Baines Johnson), to reimburse Driscoll and name the DRT custodian of the Alamo. The bill passed, and Driscoll received all of her money back.

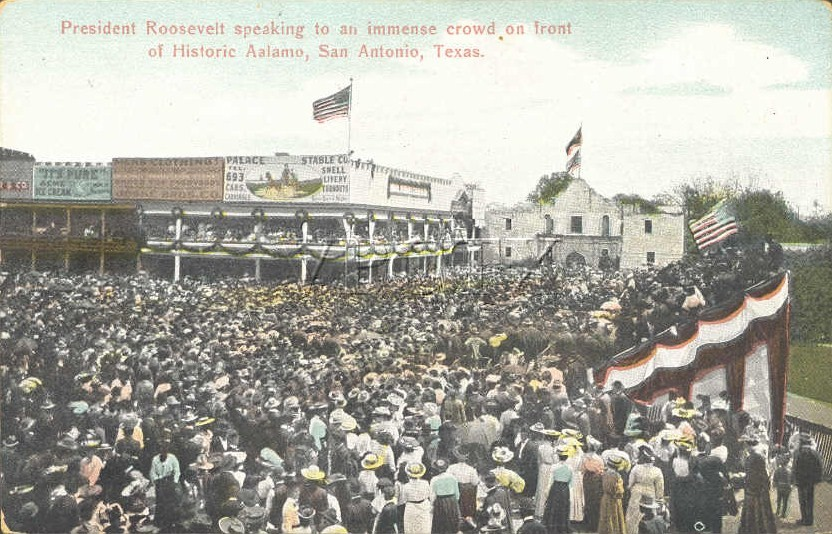
Theodore Roosevelt giving a speech at the Alamo, April 7, 1905. The picture shows the building that had been added by Hugo and Schmeltzer.

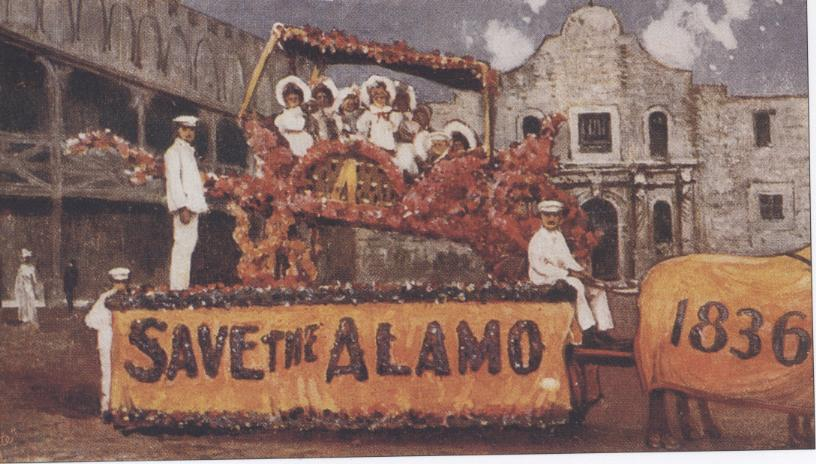
This 1907 postcard entreated citizens to Save the Alamo

Driscoll and de Zavala argued over how best to preserve the building. De Zavala wished to restore the exterior of the buildings to a state similar to its 1836 appearance, focusing on the convent (then called the long barracks), while Driscoll wanted to tear down the long barracks and create a monument similar to those she had seen in Europe: "a city center opened by a large plaza and anchored by an ancient chapel".

Unable to reach an agreement, Driscoll and several other women formed a competing chapter of the DRT named the Alamo Mission chapter. The two chapters argued over which had oversight of the Alamo. Unable to resolve the dispute, in February 1908 the executive committee of the DRT leased out the building. Angry with that decision, de Zavala announced that a syndicate wanted to buy the chapel and tear it down. She then barricaded herself in the Hugo and Schmeltzer building for three days.

In response to de Zavala's actions, on February 12, Governor Thomas Mitchell Campbell ordered that the superintendent of public buildings and grounds take control of the property. Eventually, a judge named Driscoll's chapter the official custodians of the Alamo. The DRT later expelled de Zavala and her followers.

=== Restoration ===
Driscoll offered to donate the money required to tear down the convent, build a stone wall around the Alamo complex, and convert the interior into a park. The legislature postponed a decision until after the 1910 elections after which Texas had a new governor, Oscar Branch Colquitt. Both de Zavala and Driscoll spoke, and Colquitt toured the property; three months later, Colquitt removed the DRT as official custodians of the Alamo, citing that they had done nothing to restore the property since gaining control. He also announced an intent to rebuild the convent. Shortly thereafter, the legislature paid to demolish the building that had been added by Hugo and Schmeltzer and authorized $5,000 to restore the rest of the complex. The restorations were begun, but not finished, as the appropriations fell short of the costs.

Driscoll, upset over Colquitt's decisions, used her influence as a major donor to the Democratic Party to undermine him. At the time, Colquitt was considered running for U.S. Senate. She told the New York Herald Tribune that "the Daughters desire to have a Spanish garden on the site of the old mission, but the governor will not consider it. Therefore, we are going to fight him from the stump. ... We are also going to make speeches in the districts of State Senators who voted against and killed the amendment" to return control of the mission to the DRT. Subsequently, while Colquitt was out of state on a business trip, Lieutenant Governor William Harding Mayes allowed the removal of the upper-story walls of the long barracks from the convent, leaving only the one-story walls of the west and south portions of the building. This conflict became known as the Second Battle of the Alamo. Upon their deaths in 1945 and 1955, Driscoll and de Zavala, respectively, had their bodies laid in state in the Alamo Chapel.

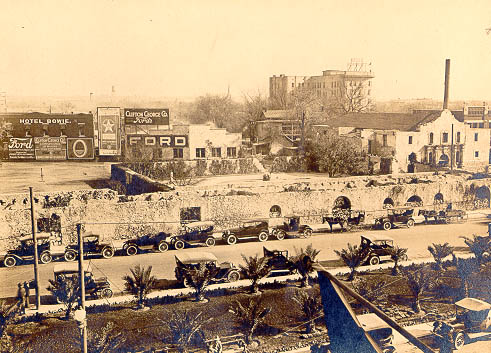
The Alamo and Downtown San Antonio c. 1920. In the center of the surrounding area are the remains of the "Long Barracks" which had been covered by the Hugo and Schmeltzer building

In 1931, Driscoll persuaded the state legislature to purchase two tracts of land between the chapel and Crockett street. In 1935, she convinced the city of San Antonio not to place a fire station in a building near the Alamo; the DRT later purchased that building and made it the DRT Library. During the Great Depression, money from the Works Progress Administration and the National Youth Administration was used to construct a wall around the Alamo and a museum, and to raze several non-historic buildings on the Alamo property. The Alamo Cenotaph designed by Pompeo Coppini was completed in 1940.

The Alamo was designated a National Historic Landmark on December 19, 1960, and was documented by the Historic American Buildings Survey in 1961. It was an inaugural listing on the National Register of Historic Places in 1966 and is a contributing property to the Alamo Plaza Historic District, which was designated in 1977. As San Antonio prepared to host the Hemisfair in 1968, the long barracks were roofed and turned into a museum. Few structural changes have taken place since then.

According to Herbert Malloy Mason's Spanish Missions of Texas, the Alamo is one of "the finest examples of Spanish ecclesiastical building on the North American continent". (Note: Mason believes that the remaining missions in San Antonio, as well as Presidio la Bahia in Goliad, Texas, are in a similar category to the Alamo building. Mason (1974), p. 71.) The mission, along with others located in San Antonio, is at risk from environmental factors, however. The limestone used to construct the buildings was taken from the banks of the San Antonio River. It expands when confronted with moisture and then contracts when temperatures drop, shedding small pieces of limestone with each cycle. Measures have been taken to partially combat the problem.

=== Ownership dispute ===
In 1988, a theater near the Alamo unveiled a new movie, Alamo: The Price of Freedom. The 40-minute-long film would be screened several times each day. The movie attracted many protests from Mexican-American activists, who decried the anti-Mexican comments and complained that it ignored Tejano contributions to the battle. The movie was re-edited in response to the complaints, but the controversy grew to the point that many activists began pressuring the legislature to move control of the Alamo to the League of United Latin American Citizens (LULAC). In response to pressure from Hispanic groups, state representative Orlando Garcia of San Antonio began legislative hearings into DRT finances. The DRT agreed to make their financial records more open, and the hearings were canceled.

[The Alamo is] one of the most important historical structures in the state. It belongs to everyone, or at least it should. ... [It] shouldn't be managed by any private group–I don't care if it is the Daughters of the Republic of Texas, the Elks, the Muslims, or the Water Buffalo Club.

— Texas legislator Ron Wilson, who wished to transfer oversight of the Alamo to the Texas Parks and Wildlife Department.

Shortly after that, San Antonio representative Jerry Beauchamp proposed that the Alamo be transferred from the DRT to the Texas Parks and Wildlife Department. Many minority legislators agreed with him. However, the San Antonio mayor, Henry Cisneros, advocated that control remain with the DRT, and the legislature shelved the bill.

Several years later, Carlos Guerra, a reporter for the San Antonio Express-News, began writing columns attacking the DRT for its handling of the Alamo. Guerra claimed that the DRT had kept the temperature too low within the chapel, a situation which caused the formation of water vapor, which when mixed with automobile exhaust fumes damaged the limestone walls. These allegations prompted the legislature in 1993 to once more attempt to transfer control of the Alamo to the Texas Parks and Wildlife Department. At the same time, State Senator Gregory Luna filed a competing bill to transfer oversight of the Alamo to the Texas Historical Commission.

Bones belonging to three adults and a child were discovered in 1936, a report in 1976 showed that the plaza was atop a cemetery, and research by San Antonio's county archivist John Leal showed that 1,006 people were buried in the area, with 921 being of Native American or mestizo descent. State law prohibited the construction of anything on top of cemeteries. Gary Gabehart, president of the Inter-Tribal Council of American Indians, called for some of the plaza to be closed off to traffic in 1994, but the DRT denied there was any evidence of burials at the Alamo.

By the following year, some advocacy groups in San Antonio had begun pressing for the mission to be turned into a larger historical park. They wished to restore the chapel to its 18th-century appearance and focus public interpretation of the site on its mission days rather than the activities of the Texas Revolution. The DRT was outraged. The head of the group's Alamo Committee, Ana Hartman, claimed that the dispute was gender-based. According to her, "There's something macho about it. Some of the men who are attacking us just resent what has been a successful female venture since 1905."

The dispute was mostly resolved in 1994, when Governor George W. Bush vowed to veto any legislation that would displace the DRT as caretakers of the Alamo. Later that year, the DRT erected a marker on the mission grounds recognizing that they had once served as Indian burial grounds. When renovations found more bones the DRT allowed the Tap Pilam Coahuiltecan Nation to perform reinterment ceremonies. Starting in 1995, the Tap Pilam Coahuiltecan Nation holds a ceremony at the church to honor the buried, except when they were denied entrance in 2019.

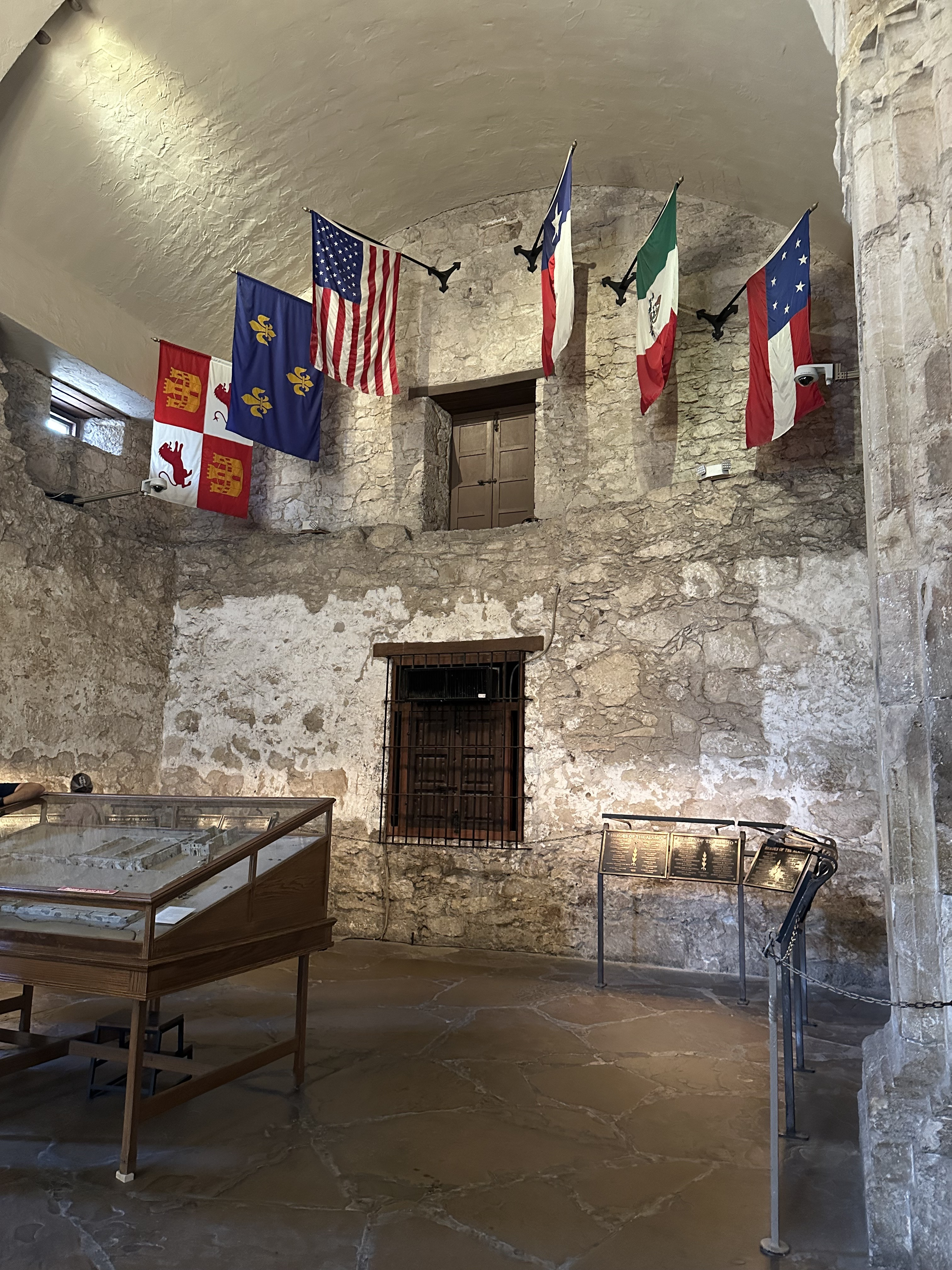
Interior of the Alamo Mission chapel in April 2025

In 2006, Sarah Reveley discovered that the DRT's annual preservation budget for the Alamo was $350. She also learned that of the $213,000 given to the group by the state between 2005 and 2008, only $37,000 was spent on the Alamo site with the rest going to their museums in Austin; the French Legation Museum received three times what was spent on the Alamo. Reveley filed a 65-page complaint against the DRT in 2009 for violating the 1905 law requiring the Alamo be properly maintained. Pieces of the ceiling's plaster in the church fell on February 11, 2009. The DRT expelled Revely, the fourth time in its history.

In 2010, the office of the Texas Attorney General received a complaint that the DRT had been mismanaging not only the site, but the funds allocated for its management, and an investigation was begun. After two years, the Attorney General's office concluded that the DRT had indeed mismanaged the Alamo, citing numerous instances of misconduct on the DRT's part, including failing to properly maintain the Alamo in good order and repair, mismanagement of state funds, and breach of fiduciary duty.

During the course of the investigation, a state law was passed in 2011 and signed by governor Rick Perry to transfer custodianship of the Alamo from the DRT to the Texas General Land Office (GLO). The transfer was officially enacted in 2015. While the DRT initially objected to the Attorney General's report, and even went so far as to file a lawsuit to prevent the transfer, the organization eventually vowed to work with the Texas GLO to preserve the Alamo for generations to come.

=== Modern use ===
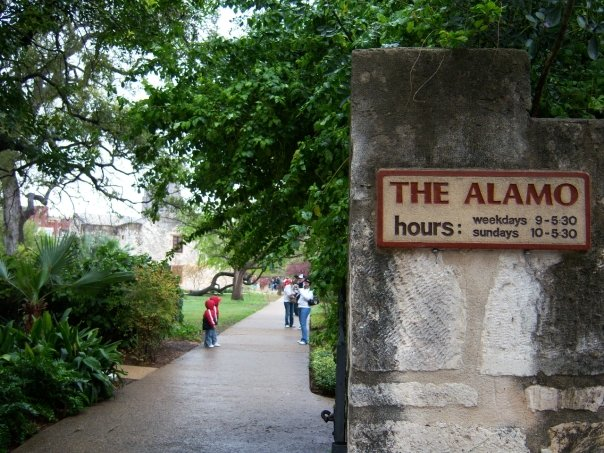
Today the site of the Alamo Mission is a museum

As of 2002, the Alamo welcomed over four million visitors each year, making it one of the most popular historic sites in the United States. Visitors may tour the chapel, as well as the Long Barracks, which contains a small museum with paintings, weapons, and other artifacts from the era of the Texas Revolution. Additional artifacts are displayed in another complex building, alongside a large diorama that recreates the compound as it existed in 1836. A large mural, known as the Wall of History, portrays the history of the Alamo complex from its mission days to modern times.

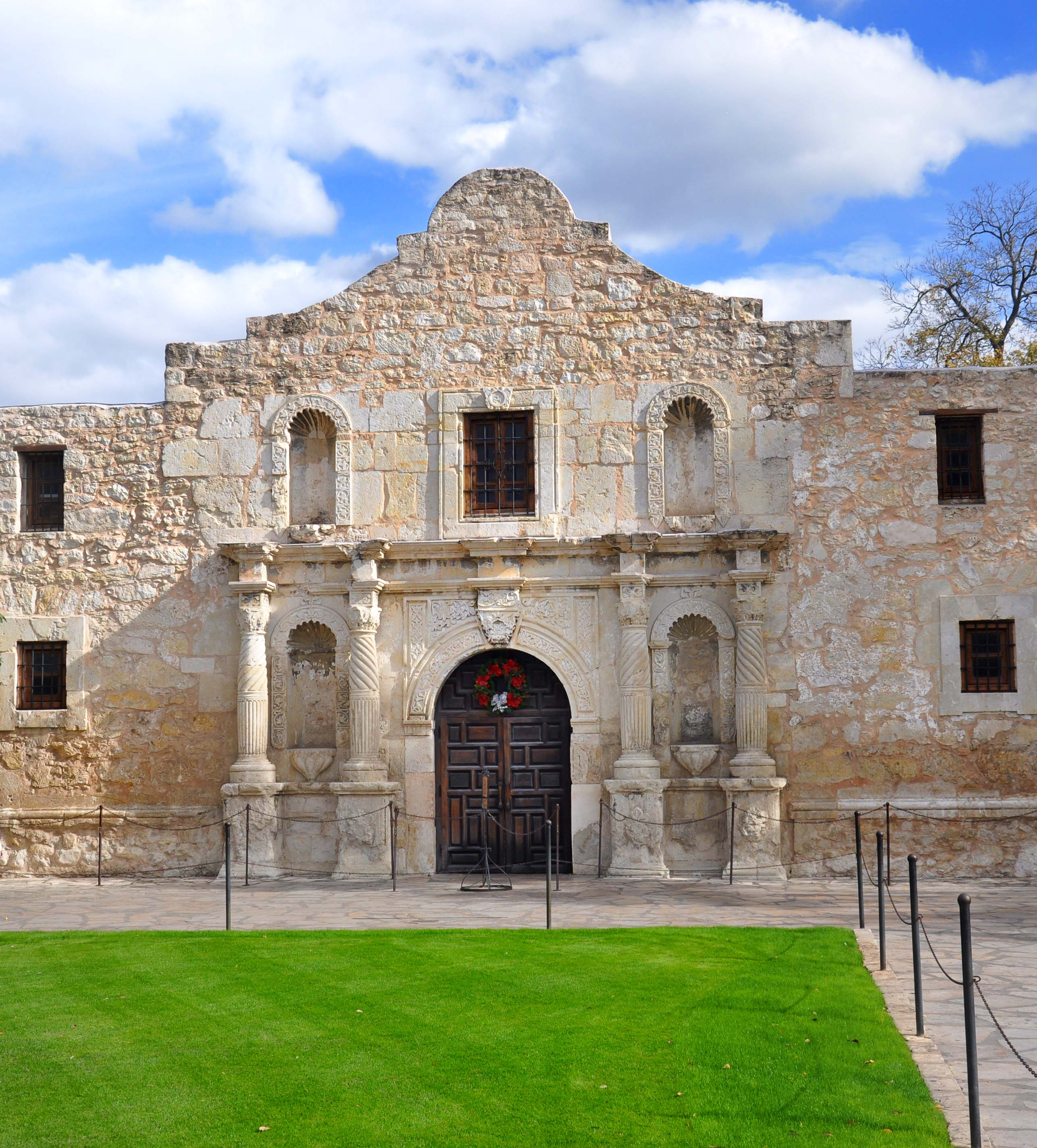
Alamo entrance

The site has an annual operating budget of $6 million, primarily funded through sales in the gift store. Under the 2011 law, which placed the Alamo under the care of the General Land Office, Commissioner George P. Bush announced on March 12, 2015, that his office would take charge of the daily operations of the Alamo from the Daughters of the Republic of Texas.

Renewed resistance to the General Land Office's master plan for the site, which envisions a quadrupling of the site to include a 100,000-square-foot museum, came from the recent consideration to move the Alamo Cenotaph to a different location. Other concerns expressed include the proposed $450 million cost of the project and any efforts to allow alterations or modifications to the story of the Alamo.

== Gallery ==
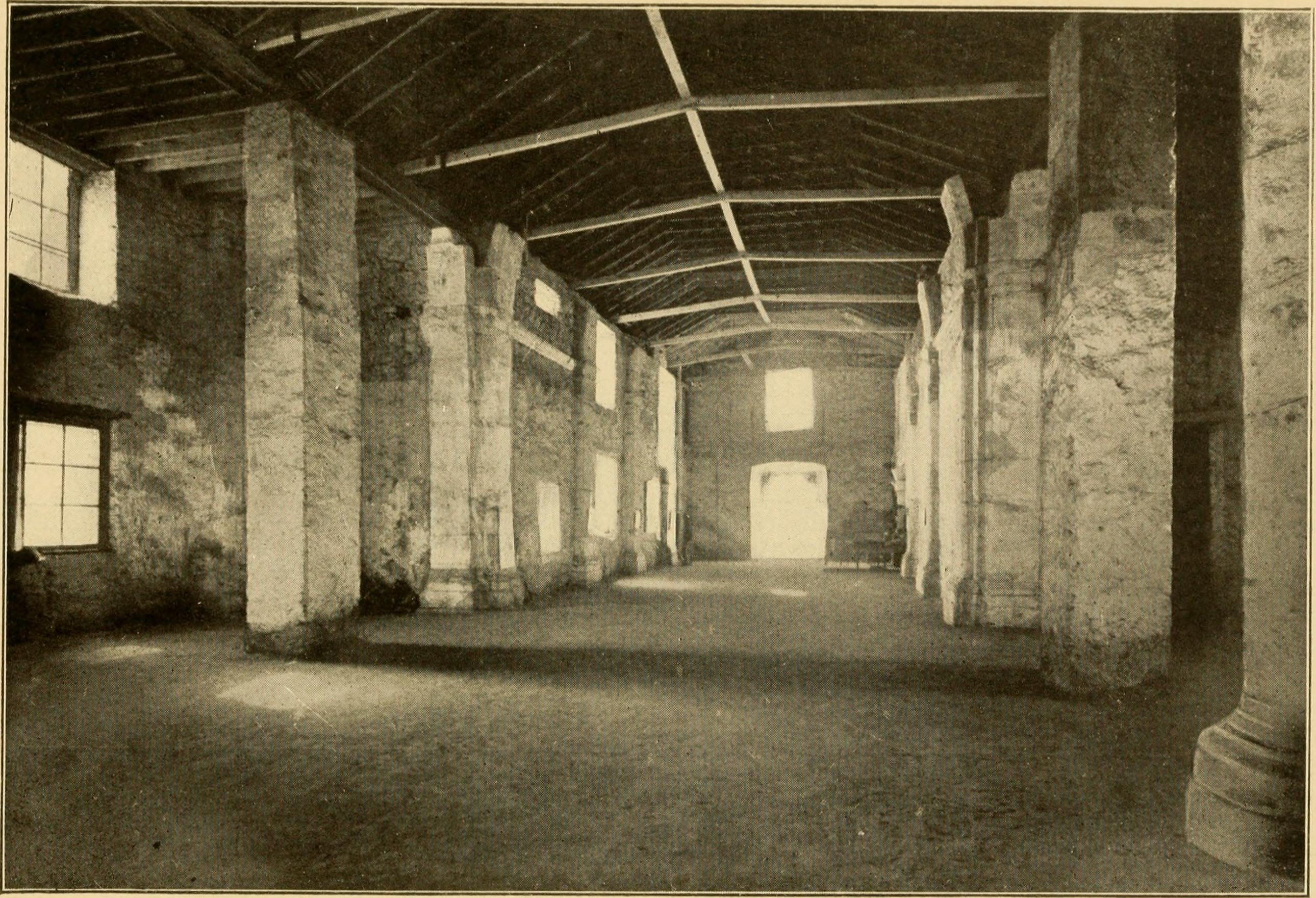
Interior of the Alamo, San Antonio, Texas about 1904 looking toward the front entrance

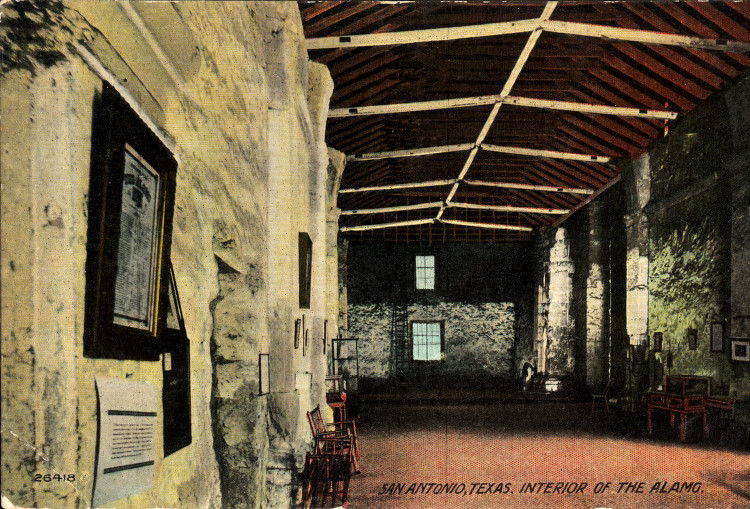
Interior of the Alamo, San Antonio, Texas (postcard, c. 1907–1914)

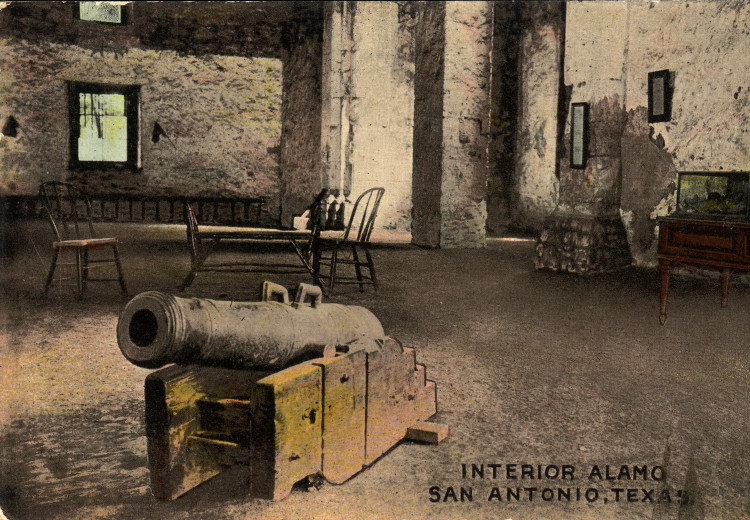
Interior Alamo, cannon, San Antonio, Texas (postcard, c. 1901–1914)

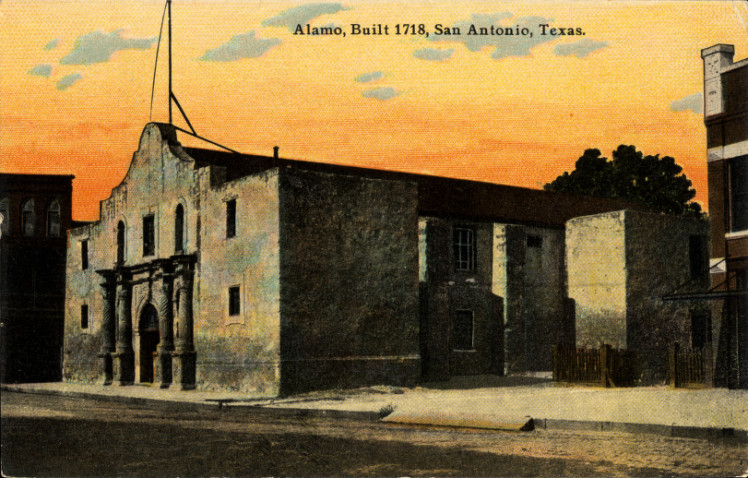
Colorized postcard c. 1910

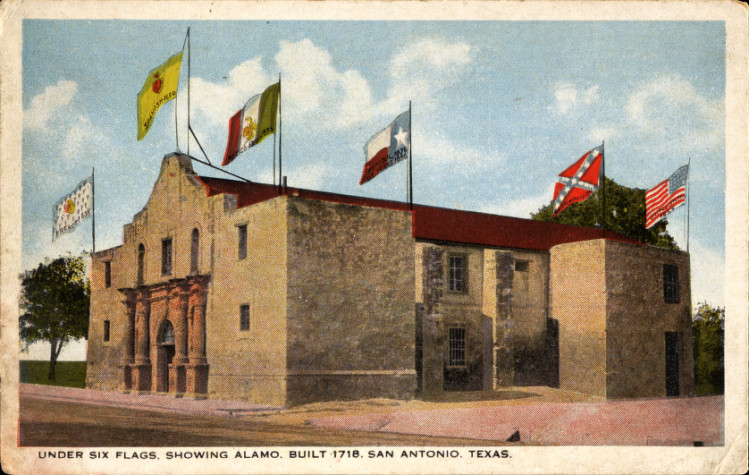
Under six flags, Alamo, San Antonio, Texas (postcard, circa 1915–1924)

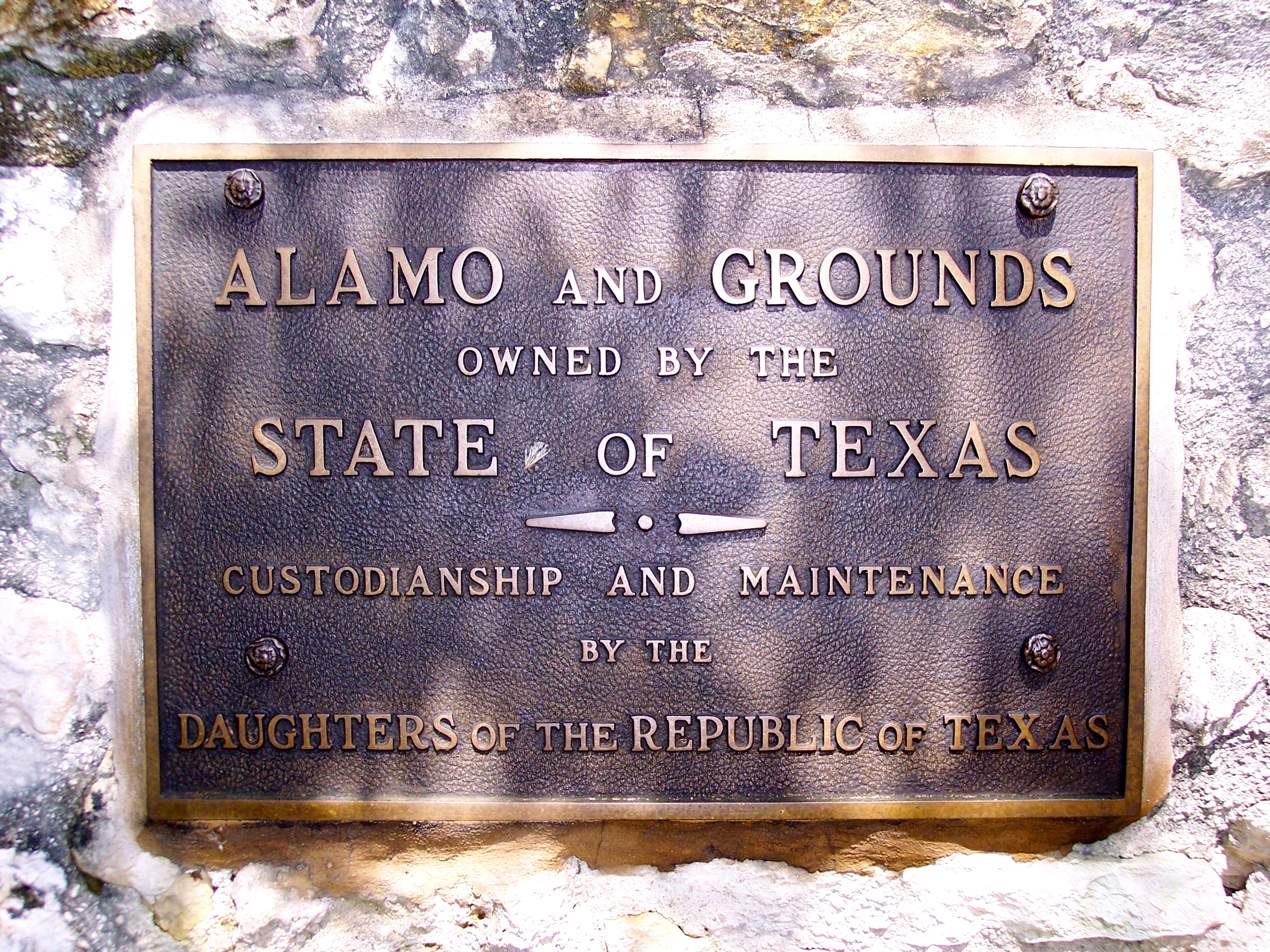
Plaque on a wall at the Alamo, recognizing ownership by the state of Texas and custodianship of the Daughters of the Republic of Texas

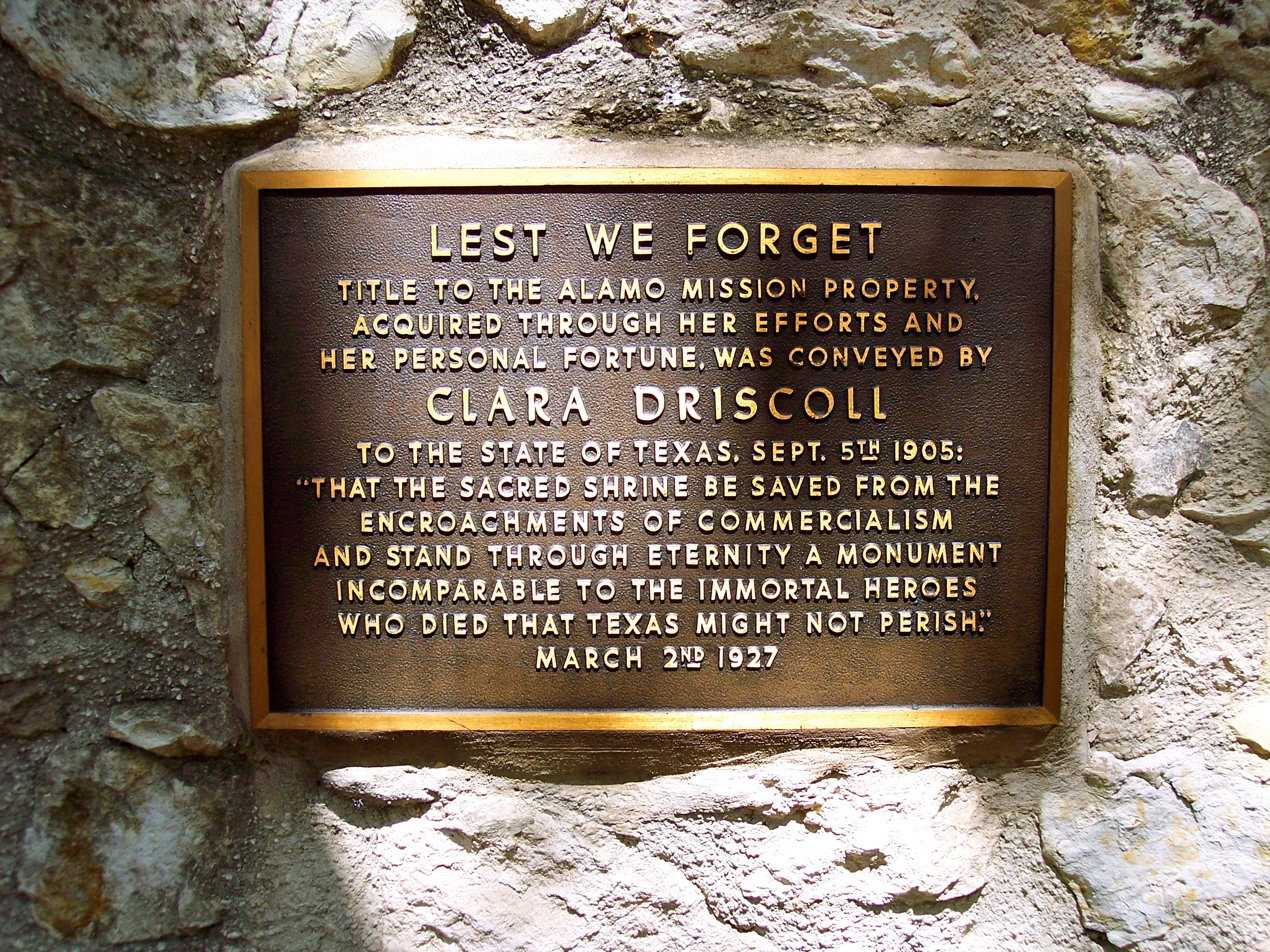
A plaque posted in remembrance of the contribution of the Alamo by Clara Driscoll to the state of Texas

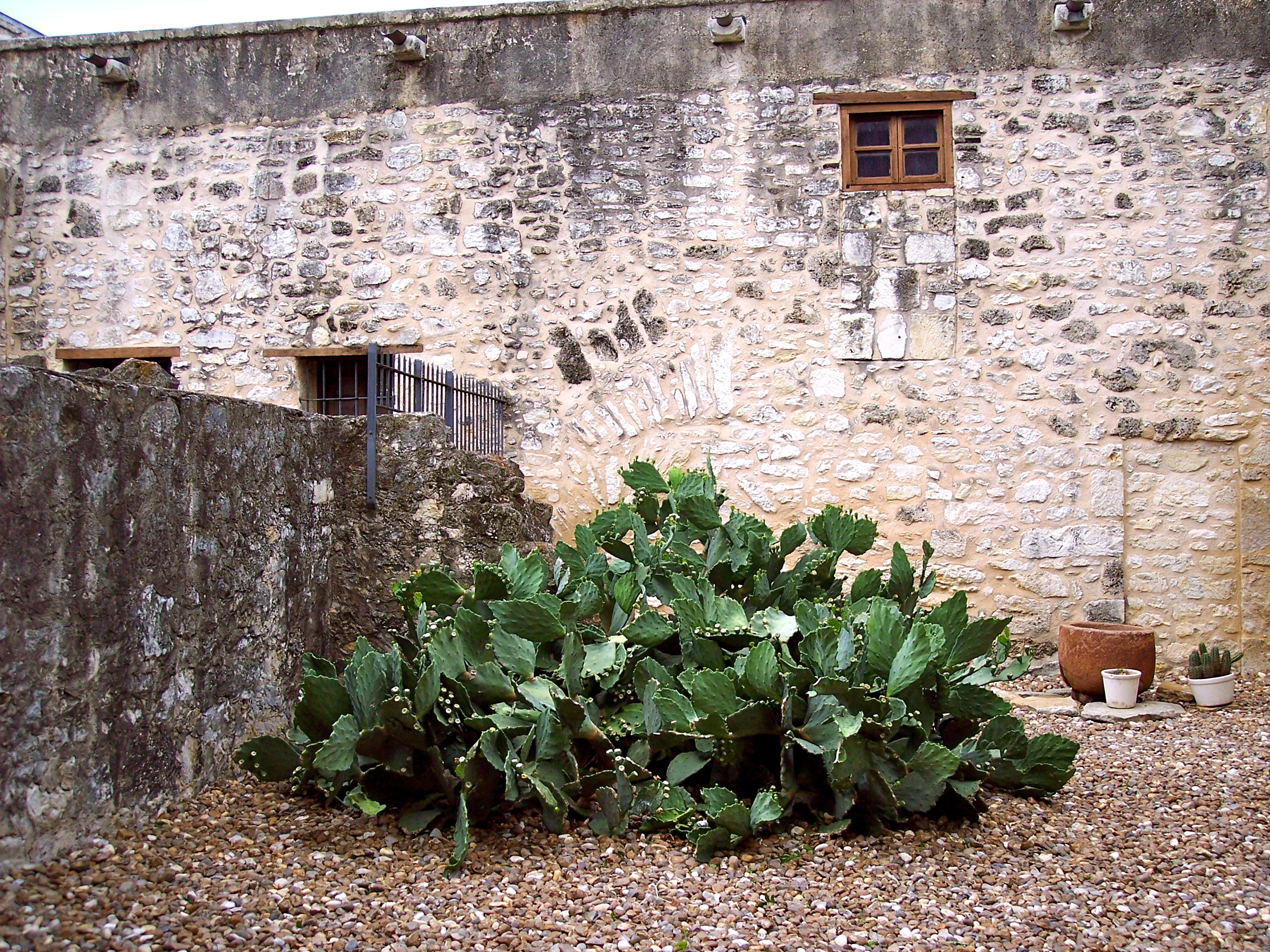
Cactus shrub adjacent to main building at the Alamo

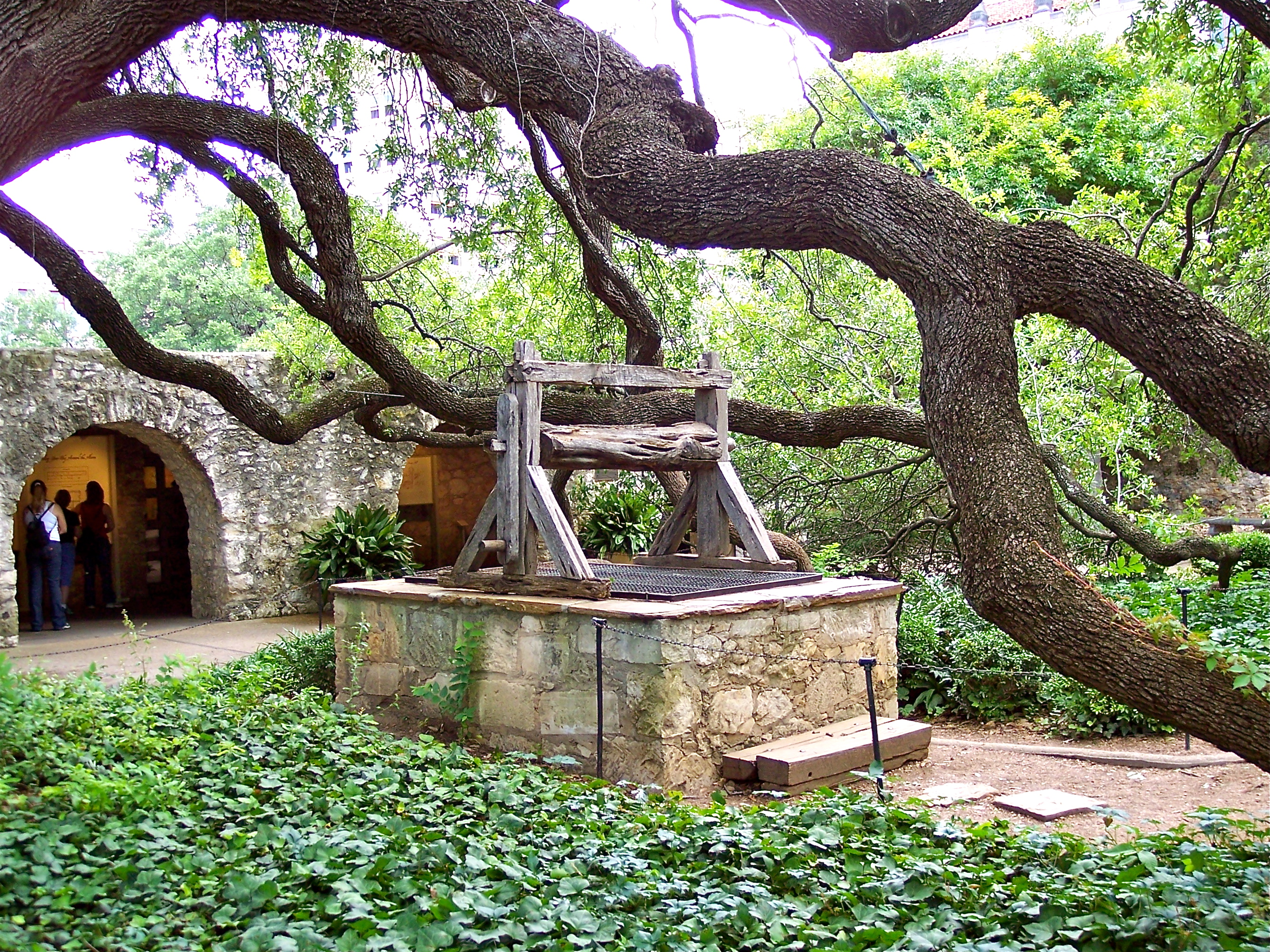
Old well and oak tree in courtyard of the Alamo

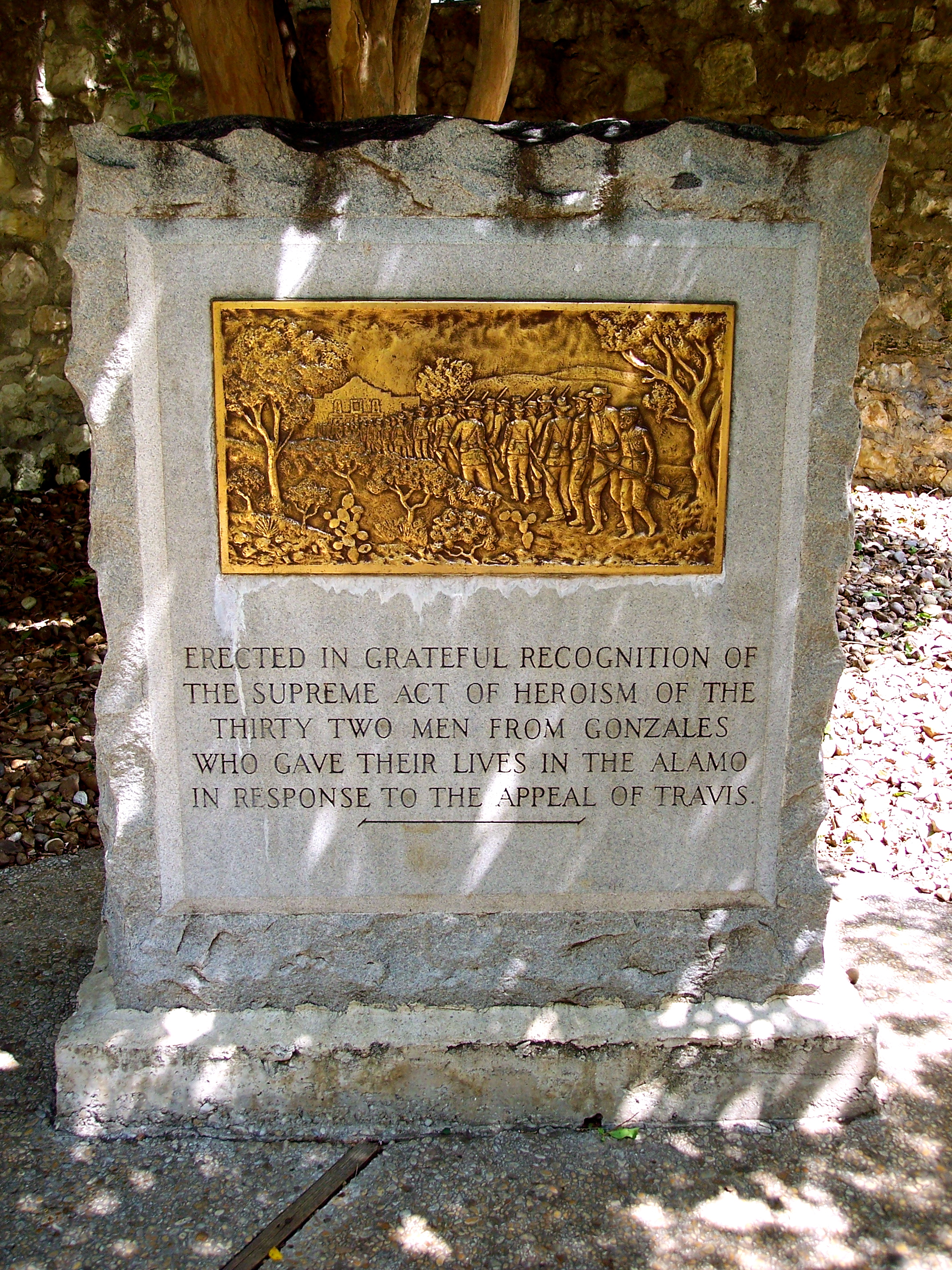
A stone memorial to the 32 men from Gonzales who perished at the Battle of the Alamo

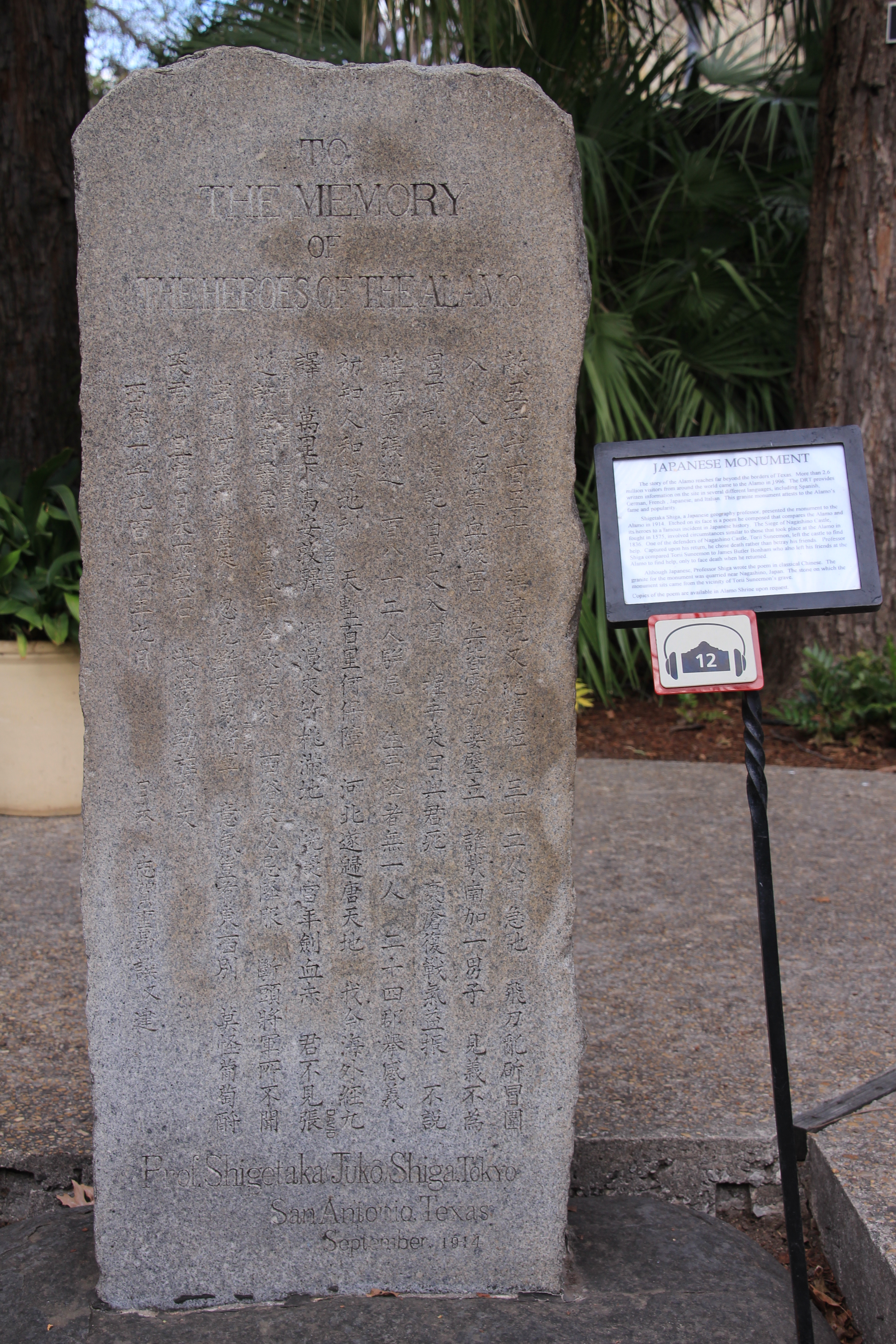
Memorial poem carved in granite written by Japanese geography professor Shiga Shigetaka in 1914 comparing the Battle to the Chinese Siege of Suiyang and the Japanese siege of Nagashino Castle

== See also ==
- Alamo Village, in Brackettville, Texas
- Espada Acequia, an aqueduct
- List of National Historic Landmarks in Texas
- List of the oldest buildings in Texas
- List of World Heritage Sites in the United States
- Main and Military Plazas Historic District
- National Register of Historic Places listings in Bexar County, Texas
- Spanish Governor's Palace

== Bibliography ==
- Barr, Alwyn (1996). Black Texans: A history of African Americans in Texas, 1528–1995 (2nd ed.). Norman, OK: University of Oklahoma Press. ISBN 0-8061-2878-X. OCLC 34742519.
- Burrough, Bryan; Thomlinson, Chris; Stanford, Jason (2021). Forget the Alamo: The Rise and Fall of an American Myth. Penguin Random House. ISBN 9781984880093.
- Chipman, Donald E. (1992). Spanish Texas, 1519–1821. Austin, TX: University of Texas Press. ISBN 0-292-77659-4. OCLC 25411908.
- Edmondson, J.R. (2000). The Alamo Story-From History to Current Conflicts. Plano, TX: Republic of Texas Press. ISBN 1-55622-678-0. OCLC 42842410.
- Groneman, Bill (1990). Alamo Defenders, A Genealogy: The People and Their Words. Austin, TX: Eakin Press. ISBN 0-89015-757-X. OCLC 20670456.
- Hardin, Stephen L. (1999). Texian Iliad. Austin, TX: University of Texas Press. ISBN 0-292-73086-1. OCLC 29704011.
- Hopewell, Clifford (1994). James Bowie Texas Fighting Man: A Biography. Austin, TX: Eakin Press. ISBN 0-89015-881-9. OCLC 27223654.
- Lord, Walter (1978). A Time to Stand. Lincoln, NE: University of Nebraska Press. ISBN 0-8032-7902-7. OCLC 3893089.
- Mason, Herbert Molloy Jr. (1974). Missions of Texas. Birmingham, AL: Southern Living Books.
- Nofi, Albert A. (1992). The Alamo and the Texas War of Independence, September 30, 1835 to April 21, 1836: Heroes, Myths, and History. Conshohocken, PA: Combined Books, Inc. ISBN 0-938289-10-1. OCLC 25833554.
- Petite, Mary Deborah (1999). 1836 Facts about the Alamo and the Texas War for Independence. Mason City, IA: Savas Publishing Company. ISBN 1-882810-35-X. OCLC 41545196.
- Roberts, Randy; Olson, James S. (2001). A Line in the Sand: The Alamo in Blood and Memory. The Free Press. ISBN 0-684-83544-4. OCLC 223395265.
- Schoelwer, Susan Prendergast (1985). Alamo Images: Changing Perceptions of a Texas Experience. Dallas, TX: The DeGlolyer Library and Southern Methodist University Press. ISBN 0-87074-213-2. OCLC 12419738.
- Thompson, Frank (2005). The Alamo. Denton, TX: University of North Texas Press. ISBN 1-57441-194-2. OCLC 58480792.
- Todish, Timothy J.; Todish, Terry; Spring, Ted (1997). Alamo Sourcebook, 1836: A Comprehensive Guide to the Battle of the Alamo and the Texas Revolution. Austin, TX: Eakin Press. ISBN 978-1-57168-152-2. OCLC 36783795.
- Weber, David J. (1992). The Spanish Frontier in North America. Yale Western Americana Series. New Haven, CT: Yale University Press. ISBN 0-300-05198-0. OCLC 185691787.
