= List of museums in the Texas Gulf Coast =

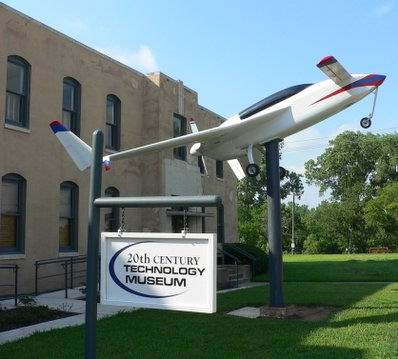
20th Century Technology Museum

The list of museums in the Texas Gulf Coast encompasses museums defined for this context as institutions (including nonprofit organizations, government entities, and private businesses) that collect and care for objects of cultural, artistic, scientific, or historical interest and make their collections or related exhibits available for public viewing. Museums that exist only in cyberspace (i.e., virtual museums) are not included. Also included are non-profit art galleries and exhibit spaces.

== Texas Gulf Coast ==
Counties included are Austin, Brazoria, Chambers, Colorado, Fort Bend, Galveston, Harris, Liberty, Matagorda, Montgomery, Orange, Walker, Waller, and Wharton County, Texas.

== Museums ==
=== Austin - Brazoria counties ===
List of museums in the Austin - Brazoria counties
Museum name	Image	City	County	Notes	Refs
Austin County Jail Museum	Austin County Jail Museum	Bellville	Austin	Recorded Texas Historic Landmark	
San Felipe de Austin State Historic Site	San Felipe de Austin State Historic Site Museum	San Felipe	Austin	Site of 1823 Stephen F. Austin colony	
Alden B. Dow Office Museum		Lake Jackson	Brazoria	Operated by the Lake Jackson Historical Association, Alden B. Dow was Lake Jackson's building designer	
Alvin Historical Museum		Alvin	Brazoria	Operated by the Alvin Museum Society	
Ammon Underwood House	Ammon Underwood House	West Columbia	Brazoria	1830s period house. National Register Listing	
Brazoria County Historical Museum		Angleton	Brazoria	Recorded Texas Historic Landmark, National Register of Historic Places	
Brazoria Historical Museum		Brazoria	Brazoria	Area history dating back to the Karankawa people	
Brazoria County Military Museum		Richwood	Brazoria	The restored 1897 Brazoria County Courthouse is currently used to house the Brazoria museum	
Brazos Valley Railroad Society		Brazoria	Brazoria	HO model scale train layout and museum, open on Saturdays	
Brazosport Center for the Arts & Sciences		Clute	Brazoria	Brazosport Art League, Brazosport Center Stages community theater, Brazosport Museum of Natural Science, BASF Planetarium, and Brazosport Symphony Orchestra	
Brazosport Museum of Natural Science		Clute	Brazoria	Features shells, fossils, dinosaur skeletons, wildlife, rocks & minerals and archeology, part of the Brazosport Center for the Arts & Sciences	
Columbia Historical Museum		West Columbia	Brazoria		
Freeport Historical Museum		Freeport	Brazoria	Discovery Dome Planetarium, Children's Museum	
Karpeles Manuscript Museum	Karpeles Manuscript Museum	Alvin	Brazoria	Part of a larger United States collection, allegedly "the world's largest private holding of important original manuscript documents"	
Lake Jackson Historical Museum		Lake Jackson	Brazoria	Prehistoric era, the plantation era, area's petrochemical industry and the founding of modern Lake Jackson	
Levi Jordan Plantation State Historic Site	Levi Jordan Plantation House	Brazoria	Brazoria	Antebellum plantation, site under development and only open to the public on a limited basis and by appointment, includes the plantation house a	
Surfside Beach Historical Museum		Surfside Beach	Brazoria	Independence era replicas and artifacts	
Marguerite Rogers House Museum		Alvin	Brazoria	Operated by the Alvin Museum Society	
Varner–Hogg Plantation State Historical Site	Varner–Hogg Plantation State Historical Site	West Columbia	Brazoria	Recorded Texas Historic Landmark. National Register Listing of historic places	

=== Chambers - Fort Bend counties ===
List of museums in Chambers - Fort Bend counties
Museum name	Image	City	County	Notes	Refs
Agricultural Historical Museum		Winnie	Chambers	Open by appointment, includes tractors, farming equipment, photos, Winnie Santa Fe Depot	
Chambers County Museum at Wallisville		Wallisville	Chambers		
Barbers Hill / Mont Belvieu Museum		Mont Belvieu	Chambers	Local history	
Baytown Historical Museum	Baytown Historical Museum	Baytown	Chambers		
Wallisville Heritage Park and Museum		Wallisville	Chambers		
Alley Log Cabin Museum		Columbus	Colorado	Abram (or Abraham) Alley built this cabin as part of the Stephen F. Austin Old Three Hundred colorization of Mexican Texas	
Confederate Memorial Museum	1883 Confederate Memorial Museum	Columbus	Colorado	Built 1883 by town of Columbus, using over 400,000 handmade bricks. Recorded Texas Historic Landmark	
Heritage Society Museum of Weimar		Weimar	Colorado	Housed in the Old Hill Bank building	
Live Oak Art Center		Columbus	Colorado	Contemporary art	
Prairie Edge Museum		Eagle Lake	Colorado	Local area culture	
Mary Elizabeth Hopkins Santa Claus Museum		Columbus	Colorado	Collected 1913-1990 by Mary Elizabeth Youens Hopkins	
Tate-Senftenberg-Brandon House	Tate-Senftenberg-Brandon House	Columbus	Colorado	19th-century house with furnishings depicting small-town life a century ago, operated by the Columbus Historical Preservation Trust	
Art Museum TX		Katy	Fort Bend	Established in 2020, Art Museum TX is a not-for-profit institution	
Art Museum TX		Sugar Land	Fort Bend	Established in 2020, Art Museum TX is a not-for-profit institution	
Black Cowboy Museum		Rosenberg	Fort Bend	Established in 2017, THE BLACK COWBOY MUSEUM TX is a not-for-profit institution	
Fort Bend Heritage Unlimited Museum		Kendleton	Fort Bend		
Fort Bend Museum		Richmond	Fort Bend	Includes the museum, Long-Smith Cottage, 1883 John M. and Lottie D. Moore House, and the McFarlane House	
Fort Bend County Heritage Unlimited Museum		Kendleton	Fort Bend	Lifestyles of African American settlers and residents from 1865 to 1965	
The Old Foster Community Museum	Old Foster Community Museum	Foster	Fort Bend	Local history	
George Ranch Historical Park		Richmond	Fort Bend	Recorded Texas Historic Landmark. 20,000 acre working ranch featuring historic homes, costumed interpreters and livestock	
Houston Museum of Natural Science at Sugarland		Sugar Land	Fort Bend	Located in Telfair, exhibits on paleontology, space, life and earth science	
Johnny Nelson Katy Heritage Museum		Katy	Fort Bend	Includes farming equipment, agricultural and pioneering history artifacts, photographs and antiques	
Katy Heritage Park		Katy	Fort Bend	Operated by the Katy Heritage Society	
Katy Heritage Society Railroad Museum		Katy	Fort Bend		
Katy Veterans Memorial Museum		Katy	Fort Bend	Artifacts from every foreign conflict involving the United States	
Rosenberg Railroad Museum	Rosenberg Railroad Museum	Rosenberg	Fort Bend	Includes a railroad tower, rail cars, model train layout	
Sugar Land Heritage Foundation		Sugar Land	Fort Bend	History of the sugar industry in Texas	

=== Galveston County ===
List of museums in Galveston County
Museum name	Image	City	County	Notes	Refs
Ashton Villa	Ashton Villa	Galveston	Galveston	National Register of Historic Places, built in 1859 by businessman James Moreau Brown	
Bishop's Palace	Bishop's Residence Galveston TX	Galveston	Galveston	Recorded Texas Historic Landmark, National Register of Historic Places, Built in 1888 for politician Walter Gresham, later sold to the Houston Diocese of the Catholic Church as a residence for Bishop Christopher Edward Byrne	
Bryan Museum	Bryan Museum	Galveston	Galveston	Museum works from the collection of J.P. Bryan, direct descendant of early settler Moses Austin	
Butler Longhorn Museum		League City	Galveston	Texas Longhorn history through art, music and artifacts	
The Cradle	The Cure	Galveston	Galveston	Birthplace of the Daughters of the Republic of Texas	
Dickinson Historic Railroad Center		Dickinson	Galveston	Artifacts and memorabilia, Dickinson Railroad Depot, the League City Railroad Depot, and the grounds surrounding those depots	
Frank J. Brown Heritage Museum and Barn		Friendswood	Galveston	Reconstructed early 1900s Quaker home with furniture and artifacts. Maintained by the Friendswood Historical Society. Frank J. Brown was one of two 1895 Quaker leaders who established Friendswood, the other being T. Hadley Lewis.	
Galveston Arts Center		Galveston	Galveston	Non-profit	
Galveston County Museum		Galveston	Galveston		
Galveston Historic Seaport		Galveston	Galveston	National Register of Historic Places	
Galveston Railroad Museum	A Case Corporation tractor at the Galveston Railroad Museum	Galveston	Galveston	Railroad - includes rolling stock, model trains, devastation caused by Hurricane Ike, maps, railroad jargon, pictures from the Southern Railroad and the Panama Railway exhibit, railroad dining cars and china	
Galveston Naval Museum		Galveston	Galveston	Home to the USS CAVALLA (WWII Submarine) and the USS STEWART (destroyer escort - one of only 3 in the world)	
Michel B. Menard House	Home of Michael Branamour Menard	Galveston	Galveston	1838 house, operated by the Galveston Historical Foundation	
Moody Mansion	The William Lewis Moody Home	Galveston	Galveston	Recorded Texas Historic Landmark, National Register of Historic Places	
Moody Gardens	Rainforest Pyramid	Galveston	Galveston	Includes Discovery Pyramid with traveling exhibits about science and space, Rainforest Pyramid with animals and plants, and the Aquarium Pyramid	
Ocean Star Offshore Drilling Rig & Museum	Derrick of Ocean Star Offshore Oil Rig & Museum	Galveston	Galveston	History and technology of the area offshore oil and gas industry	
Old Kemah School Museum and Old Railroad Station Museum		Kemah	Galveston		
Rosenberg Library Museum		Galveston	Galveston	Recorded Texas Historic Landmark	
Seawolf Park		Galveston	Galveston	Includes the submarine USS Cavalla (SS-244), the ASW destroyer escort USS Stewart (DE-238), and the remains of a merchant ship	
Texas City Museum		Texas City	Galveston		
Texas Seaport Museum	Elissa in full sail	Galveston	Galveston	Includes the three-masted barque Elissa	
West Bay Common School Children's Museum		League City	Galveston	Managed by the League City Historical Society	

=== Harris County ===
List of museums in Harris County
Museum name	Image	City	County	Notes	Refs
1940 Air Terminal Museum	1940 Air Terminal Museum	Houston	Harris	Located at William P. Hobby Airport. "Wings and Wheels", Wings Over Houston Airshow, "HobbyFest", the Pops & Props Gala and Silent Auction	
American Cowboy Museum		Houston	Harris		
American Indian Genocide Museum		Houston	Harris	Genocide of American Indians	
Art Car Museum		Houston	Harris	Contemporary art including art cars, fine arts, and artists that are rarely seen in other cultural institutions	
Art League Houston		Houston	Harris	Alternative art exhibitions	
Asia Society Texas Center		Houston	Harris	Facility of the Asia Society, includes an art gallery and Allen Sculpture Garden, art and culture presentations	
Bay Area Museum		Seabrook	Harris	Exhibits include NASA memorabilia, Japanese artifacts, Karankawa Indians, Lunar Rendezvous Festival	
Bayou Bend Collection and Gardens		Houston	Harris	Recorded Texas Historic Landmark, National Register of Historic Places,	
Baytown Historical Museum		Baytown	Harris	Recorded Texas Historic Landmark	
Blaffer Art Museum		Houston	Harris	Part of the University of Houston, exhibits national and international works as well as artwork by students	
Buffalo Soldiers National Museum		Houston	Harris	Recorded Texas Historic Landmark	
Children's Museum of Houston	Children's Museum of Houston	Houston	Harris	90,000 square feet of innovative, interactive bilingual exhibits	
Contemporary Arts Museum Houston		Houston	Harris	Contemporary art created within the past 40 years	
Czech Center Museum Houston		Houston	Harris	Paintings, sculpture, folk art and artifacts, cultural center to preserve the language, scholarship and arts of Bohemia, Moravia, Silesia and Slovakia	
Cypress Top Historic Park Museum		Houston	Harris		
DiverseWorks		Houston	Harris	Nonprofit, established to encourage local areas artists	
Dunham Bible Museum		Houston	Harris		
Health Museum		Houston	Harris	Also known as the John Philip McGovern Museum of Health & Medical Science	
Heritage Society Museum		Houston	Harris	Part of Sam Houston Park, includes exhibits of local history, several historic houses and a church	
Holocaust Museum Houston		Houston	Harris	The 1941-1945 Holocaust in Nazi Germany	
Houston Bicycle Museum	Houston Bicycle Museum	Houston	Harris	As of May 2022, owner was retiring and looking for a new owner	
Houston Center for Contemporary Craft		Houston	Harris	Fiber, metal, glass, clay and wood	
Houston Center for Photography		Houston	Harris	Exhibits of historic and contemporary photography	
Houston Fire Museum		Houston	Harris		
Houston Maritime Museum		Houston	Harris	Includes ship models, navigation instruments and maritime artifacts	
Houston Museum of African American Culture		Houston	Harris	African American history and culture, including regional and national	
Houston Museum of Natural Science		Houston	Harris	Natural history and science	
Houston Police Department Museum		Houston	Harris	Artifacts from the Honor Guard, SWAT, Mounted Patrol, badges, uniforms and other equipment	
Humble Museum		Humble	Harris	Exhibits include oil, cattle, lumber, churches and everyday life	
John C. Freeman Weather Museum		Houston	Harris		
Jung Center of Houston		Houston	Harris	Features an art gallery	
Lawndale Art Center	Lawndale Art Center	Houston	Harris		
Lone Star Flight Museum		Houston	Harris	Features historic aircraft and the Texas Aviation Hall of Fame	
McKay Clinic Medical Museum		Humble	Harris	Original furniture and equipment from the 1938 medical clinic, open by appointment with the Humble Museum	
Menil Collection		Houston	Harris	20th century art	
MKT Depot		Katy	Harris	Historic depot and caboose, area railroad artifacts, operated by the Katy Heritage Society	
Michael E. DeBakey Library and Museum		Houston	Harris	aka DeBakey Library and Museum of Baylor College of Medicine	
Museum of American Architecture and Decorative Arts		Houston	Harris	Part of Houston Baptist University	
Museum of Fine Arts, Houston		Houston	Harris	Collection of the museum spans more than 6,000 years of history with approximately 64,000 works from six continents	
Museum of Printing History		Houston	Harris	Also called The Printing Museum	
Museum of Southern History		Houston	Harris	Part of Houston Baptist University, history of the South during the mid-19th century with period room displays	
National United States Armed Forces Museum		Houston	Harris	Also known as the Military Museum of Houston	
National Museum of Funeral History		Houston	Harris	Exhibits include caskets, funeral and mourning artifacts and rituals	
Pasadena Heritage Park & Museum		Pasadena	Harris	Local history	
Pearl Fincher Museum of Fine Arts		Spring	Harris	Features three galleries of changing exhibits	
Pioneer Memorial Log House Museum		Houston	Harris	Located in Hermann Park, operated by the San Jacinto Chapter of the Daughters of the Republic of Texas	
The Printing Museum		Houston	Harris		
Rice University Art Gallery		Houston	Harris		
Rienzi		Houston	Harris		
Rothko Chapel		Houston	Harris	Nondenominational chapel with art by Mark Rothko	
Rutherford B. H. Yates Museum		Houston	Harris	History of the Freedmen's Town National Historic District	
San Jacinto Battleground State Historic Site	San Jacinto Battlefield Monument	La Porte	Harris	National Register of Historic Places	
San Jacinto Museum of History		La Porte	Harris	National Register of Historic Places	
Seismique		Houston	Harris	Immersive and interactive art museum	
Space Center Houston	Apollo 11 Command Module at Space Center Houston	Houston	Harris	Visitor's center of the Lyndon B. Johnson Space Center	
Spring Historical Museum		Spring	Harris	Located at the western edge of "Old Town Spring"	
Station Museum of Contemporary Art		Houston	Harris	Jim and Ann Harithas, museum directors	
Strake Jesuit Art Museum		Houston	Harris	Part of Strake Jesuit College Preparatory	
Sylvan Beach Depot Museum and Library		La Porte	Harris	Operated by the La Porte Heritage Society	
Tomball Museum Center		Tomball	Harris	Operated by the Spring Creek County Historical Association	
USS Texas	USS Texas	La Porte	Harris	Battleship, part of San Jacinto Battleground State Historic Site, National Register Listing	

=== Liberty - Montgomery counties ===
List of museums in the Liberty - Montgomery counties
Museum name	Image	City	County	Notes	Refs
Sam Houston Regional Library and Research Center		Liberty	Liberty	Includes changing exhibits of South Texas history from its collections and two historic house museums	
City By the Sea Museum		Palacios	Matagorda	Museum of the Palacios Area Historical Association, exhibits include Camp Hulen, fishing, ships, agriculture, Hurricane Carla, Karankawa Indians	
Matagorda County Museum		Bay City	Matagorda	Bay City's first post office, displays of historical artifacts	
Fernland Historical Park		Montgomery	Montgomery	City park with early Texas frontier architecture	
Footprints in Courage Museum		Shenandoah	Montgomery	Located inside the Shenandoah Visitors Center	
Heritage Museum of Montgomery County, Texas		Conroe	Montgomery	Child-friendly and handicap accessible	
Magnolia Depot Museum	Magnolia Depot	Magnolia	Montgomery	Built in 1902 by the International and Great Northern Railroad	
N.H. Davis Pioneer Complex and Museum		Montgomery	Montgomery	Replica of the original sketch of the Lone Star Flag and Republic of Texas seal, drawn by Republic political leader Charles Bellinger Stewart	
Sam Houston Regional Library and Research Center		Liberty	Montgomery	Memorabilia related to Sam Houston, 110-acre complex. Includes the home of formerTexas Governor Price Daniel and his wife Jean Houston Baldwin, a direct descendant of Sam Houston	
Texas Flag Park		Conroe	Montgomery	aka Lone Star Monument and Historical Flag Park	
The Woodlands Children's Museum		Woodlands	Montgomery	Children's	

=== Wharton county ===
List of museums in the Wharton county
Museum name	Image	City	County	Notes	Refs
20th Century Technology Museum	20th Century Technology Museum	Wharton	Wharton	Wide variety	
Danish Heritage Museum of Danevang		Danevang	Wharton	Exhibits related to the everyday lives of the Danish pioneer settlers of Danevang	
Egypt Plantation Museum		Egypt	Wharton	Empire period house, also includes depot museum with ranching heritage and plantation life displays, and Texas history	
El Campo Museum of Natural History		El Campo	Wharton	Started in 1978 by E. A. Weinheimer	
Wharton County Historical Museum		Wharton	Wharton	History, culture, and traditions of the county	

== Defunct museums ==
- Byzantine Fresco Chapel Museum, Houston, closed in 2012
- Forbidden Gardens, Katy, closed in 2011
- Geraldine D. Humphreys Museum, Liberty, closed in 1984
- Gulf Coast Archive and Museum, Houston, archive still open by appointment but museum is closed
- Samuel May Williams House, Galveston, closed in 2007
- Tate-Senftenberg-Brandon House, Columbus, closed in 2006

== See also ==
- Museum District, Houston, Texas
- List of museums in Texas
- List of museums in East Texas
- List of museums in Central Texas
- List of museums in North Texas
- List of museums in the Texas Panhandle
- List of museums in South Texas
- List of museums in West Texas

== Sources ==
- Texas Association of Museums
- Historic House Museums in Texas
