= Forbidden Kingdom =

Forbidden Kingdom may refer to:

- The Forbidden Kingdom, a 2008 martial arts film starring Jackie Chan and Jet Li
  - The Forbidden Kingdom (soundtrack), a soundtrack album from the film
- Viy (2014 film) or Forbidden Kingdom, a Russian dark fantasy film starring Jason Flemyng
- Forbidden Kingdoms, a setting in Dungeons & Dragons
- Forbidden Kingdom, an area at Chessington World of Adventures theme park in London
- Het verboden rijk (lit. The Forbidden Kingdom), a 1932 novel by J. Slauerhoff
- Bhutan, a country sometimes referred to as the Forbidden Kingdom

== See also ==
- Forbidden City (disambiguation)
