= Hally Ballinger Bryan Perry =

Co-founder of the Daughters of the Republic of Texas

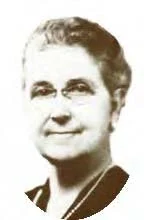
- Born: Hally Ballinger Bryan; January 10, 1868; Galveston, Texas, U.S.
- Died: June 27, 1955 (aged 87); Alpine, Texas, U.S.
- Resting place: Texas State Cemetery
- Education: Hollins Institute
- Occupation: clubwoman
- Known for: Co-founder of the Daughters of the Republic of Texas
- Spouse: Emmett Lee Perry
- Parent(s): Guy M. Bryan (father); Laura H. Jack (mother)
- Relatives: William Pitt Ballinger (uncle); Betty Ballinger (cousin); Stephen F. Austin (granduncle)

Hally Ballinger Bryan Perry (January 10, 1868 – June 27, 1955) was an American civic leader and co-founder of the Daughters of the Republic of Texas.

== Early life, family, and education ==
Perry was born Hally Ballinger Bryan on January 10, 1868 in Galveston, Texas, to Colonel Guy Morrison Bryan and Laura Harrison Jack. She was the granddaughter of Emily Austin Perry and James Bryan and a great-granddaughter of Moses Austin. She was a grandniece of Stephen F. Austin, known as the "Father of Texas". Perry's father served in the United State Congress representing Texas's 2nd congressional district.

Following her mother's death, the family moved to The Oake, the estate of her aunt and uncle, Harriet Patrick Jack Ballinger and William Pitt Ballinger.

She attended Hollins Institute in Virginia.

== Civic activities ==
Perry was a member of the Texas State Historical Association, the Texas Folklore Society, the Philosophical Society of Texas, the American Association of University Women, and Delta Kappa Gamma.

In 1940, she organized the Pan American Round Table of Houston. She also served on the Texas State Library Historical Commission. She was also member of the baord of directors of the Alpine Community Center.

Following her father's death, Perry became one of the executors of the Stephen F. Austin papers, which she presented to the University of Texas at Austin. The Hally Bryan Perry Fund for Historical Research was established at the university in 1954.

=== Daughters of the Republic of Texas ===
In 1891, Perry and her cousin, Betty Ballinger, founded the Daughters of the Republic of Texas, a women's lineage society focused on historical research into the Republic of Texas and promoting celebration of Texas Independence Day. They established the first chapter at The Cradle, a small building on the Ballinger estate that originally housed her uncle's law office. Perry gave the building its name in 1936. She founded a local chapter of the organization which was named in her honor. Perry served as secretary for an early executive committee of the Daughters of the Republic of Texas and afterward held the title of honorary life president, but did not hold any other office in the organization.

== Personal life and death ==
Perry was a member of the Presbyterian church.

On November 3, 1909, she married her half-cousin, Emmett Lee Perry, and moved to Bay City, Texas. Following her husband's death in 1921, she moved to Houston and travelled extensively to Europe, Latin America, and throughout the United States.

She died on June 27, 1955 in Alpine, Texas, and was buried at Texas State Cemetery.
