= Forbidden City (disambiguation) =

The Forbidden City is a palace complex in Dongcheng District, Beijing, China.

Forbidden City or The Forbidden City may also refer to:

== Places ==
- Government Complex No. 1 (Pyongyang), headquarters of the Worker's Party of Korea in North Korea
- Imperial City of Huế, or the Purple Forbidden City, in Vietnam
- Ming Palace, or the Forbidden City of Nanjing, China

== Arts and entertainment ==
- The Forbidden City (1918 film), a 1918 American film directed by Sidney Franklin
- The Forbidden City (2025 film), a 2025 Italian film directed by Gabriele Mainetti
- Forbidden City (nightclub), a defunct Chinese cabaret in San Francisco, California, US
- Forbidden City (novel), a 1990 novel by William E. Bell
- "Forbidden City" (song), a 1996 song by Electronic
- "Forbidden City", a song by Tina Guo

== See also ==
- Forbidden Gardens, a defunct outdoor museum of Chinese culture and history in Texas, US
- Forbidden Kingdom (disambiguation)
- Gugong (disambiguation)
