= Lucille Langford =

American geologist, micro-paleontologist, teacher

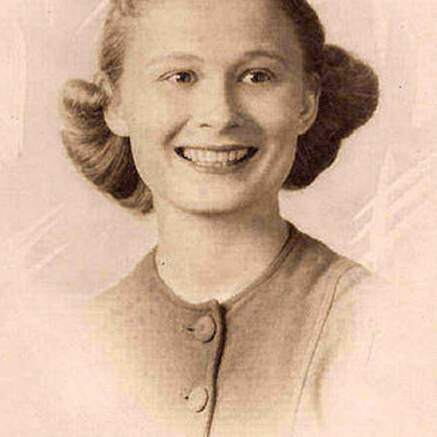
- Born: Lucille Evelyn Treybig; August 31, 1919; Yoakum, Texas, U.S.
- Died: September 23, 2008 (aged 89); San Antonio, Texas, U.S.
- Occupations: geologist; micro-paleontologist; teacher
- Spouse: Eldon W. Langford
- Children: Alan Langford; Brian Langford; Dr. Lauren Langford

Lucille Evelyn Langford (née Treybig; August 31, 1919 – September 23, 2008) was an American geologist, micro-paleontologist, and bilingual Spanish/English teacher.

== Education and career ==
Lucille Treybig graduated from Austin High School in Texas and received multiple degrees at the University of Texas, including a Bachelors in Science, Masters, and a Doctorate. From there, Langford went on to become a member of the Phi Beta Kappa Honour Society of Texas. After her university accomplishments, she pursued a career in micropaleontology while also teaching bilingual Spanish and English education.

== Publications ==
During her career, Langford went on to be published and featured in many geological journals including "A critical Analysis of Programs in the Earth Sciences in Texas Junior Colleges Vol 35:5 p. 2540A, 1974", "Rock Hounds of Houston", and many more.

== Personal life ==
She met her husband in the University of Texas; they went on to be married for 60 years. They had three children, two sons and a daughter. Langford was a member of the Daughters of the Republic of Texas, and came from a long line of Texas pioneers.
