= Betty Ballinger =

American suffragist

Betty Eve Ballinger
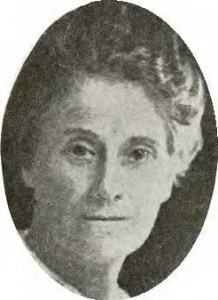
- Born: February 3, 1854; Galveston, Texas
- Died: February 3, 1936 (aged 81); Galveston, Texas
- Known for: Co-founder of the Daughters of the Republic of Texas (DRT), founder of the Sidney Sherman Chapter of DRT (Galveston)
- Parent(s): William Pitt Ballinger, Harriet Patrick (Jack) Ballinger
- Relatives: William Houston Jack (grandfather)

Betty Eve Ballinger (1854–1936) was an American suffragist and clubwoman who co-founded the Daughters of The Republic of Texas.

== Early life ==
Betty Eve Ballinger was born in Galveston, Texas, on February 3, 1854, to William and Harriet Patrick Jack Ballinger. Her grandfather was William Houston Jack, a veteran of the Battle of San Jacinto and a public official in the Republic of Texas. Her father, William Pitt Ballinger, was a Galveston attorney.

Ballinger attended primary school in New Orleans and Baltimore. When she was not away at school, she resided in the family's home in Galveston.

== Career ==
Ballinger and Hally Ballinger Bryan Perry (a cousin) were concerned about preserving the memory of those who fought in the Texas Revolution, especially those who served at the Battle of San Jacinto. In 1891, Ballinger and her cousin met other distinguished women in Houston and formed the Daughters of the Republic of Texas, establishing a meeting place at The Cradle, a building on the Ballinger family's estate. She joined its executive committee, which composed a constitution and by-laws. The group convened its first annual meeting in Lampasas, Texas in 1892. Meanwhile, Ballinger formed the Galveston Chapter of the organization and led the chapter for its first few years.

In 1912, Ballinger joined the Galveston Equal Suffrage Association and served of as the new organization first vice president. Their attempt to convince local voters to extend suffrage in Galveston failed, though, as the pro-suffrage movement was linked to prohibition of alcohol and both amendments were defeated by a similar margin.

She was a member of the Daughters of the American Revolution and the Colonial Dames XVII Century.
