= SPARK Museum of Electrical Invention =

Museum in Bellingham, Washington

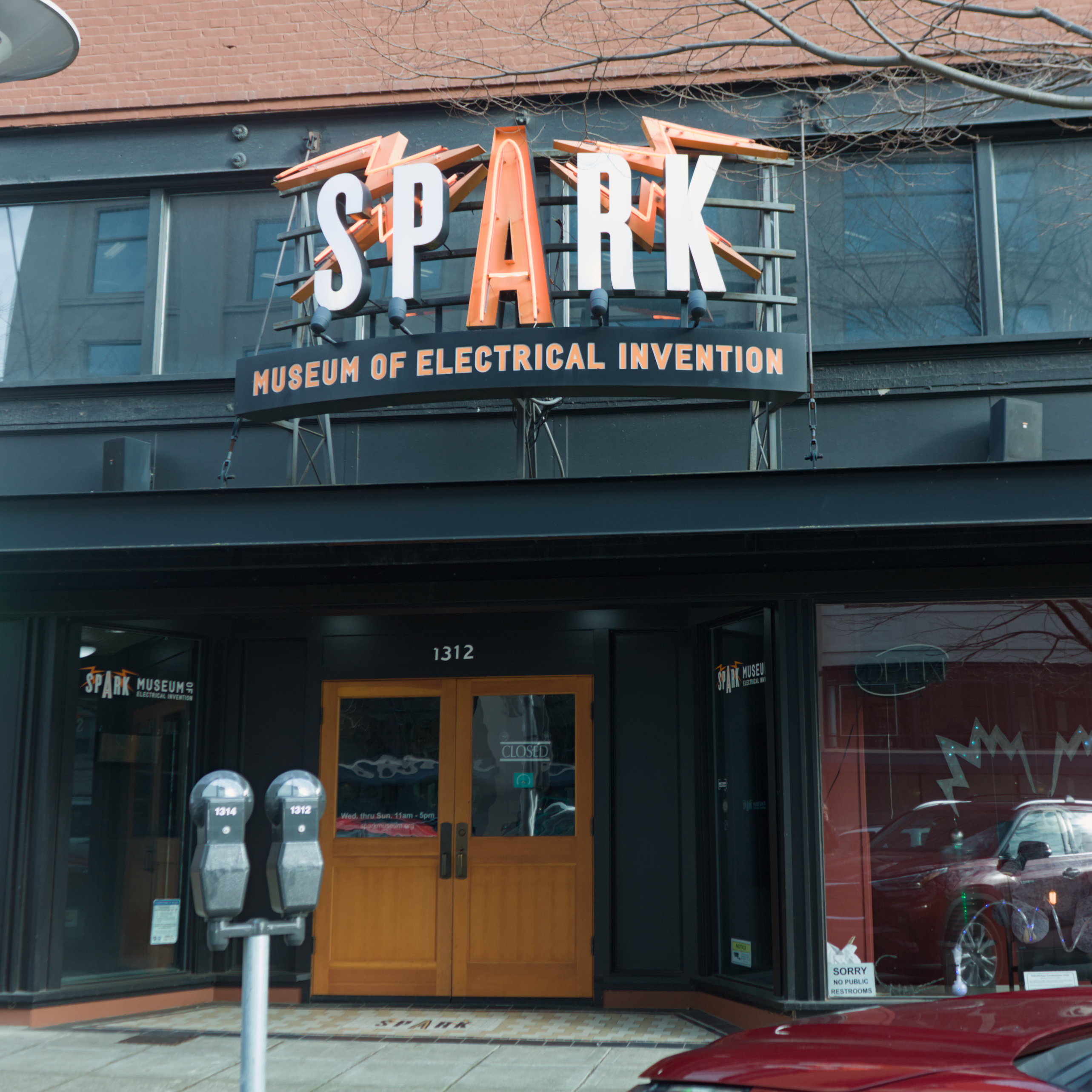
- Spark Museum Entrance from Bay Street
- Former name: American Museum of Radio and Electricity
- Established: 1985; 41 years ago
- Location: Bellingham, Washington, Washington, U.S.
- Coordinates: 48.751458°N 122.480386°W
- Type: Science museum
- Visitors: 20,000 (2022)
- Public transit access: Champion St. & Prospect St.,Whatcom Transportation Authority
- Parking: Street parking & a parking garage at 1300 Commercial St.
- Website: www.sparkmuseum.org

The SPARK Museum of Electrical Invention (formerly known as the American Museum of Radio and Electricity) is an interactive science and history museum located in Bellingham, Washington, United States. Through interactive galleries and public programs, the museum illustrates the science and technology of electricity, radio, and related inventions that shaped human history. Its collection features artifacts spanning more than four centuries of innovation, from 1580 to the 1950s.

== Museum history ==
The museum began in 1985 as an informal collection of radio sets, electronic components, electrical schematics, historical recordings, and vintage magazines and manuals on display in a modest space in downtown Bellingham. By 1998, as the collection grew to more than 800 antique radio sets, Jonathon Winter chose to formalize his collection into the Bellingham Antique Radio Museum.

The museum expanded significantly in 2001 when Winter's collection was combined with wireless and electrical devices owned by John Jenkins, a former Microsoft sales and marketing executive. With the combined collection, Winter and Jenkins moved the museum into a new 25,000-square-foot (2,300 m^{2}) facility and renamed it to the American Museum of Radio and Electricity.

In 2012, the American Museum of Radio and Electricity became Spark Museum of Electrical Invention to reflect its growth beyond a radio history museum to a center emphasizing the discovery of electricity and the historical role of electrical innovation.

== Collections ==
The museum holds an inventory of more than 10,000 items, with thousands of historic artifacts on exhibit. Among its notable holdings are an early 1879 Edison incandescent light bulb, an inaugural instrument from the 1915 transcontinental telephone line, and pioneering Voltaic direct-current batteries.

Many rare original books and papers on electricity are in the collection. Authors include William Gilbert, Isaac Newton, Galileo Galilei, Benjamin Franklin, Alessandro Volta, Heinrich Hertz, and Guglielmo Marconi.

Notable Artifacts in the Collection

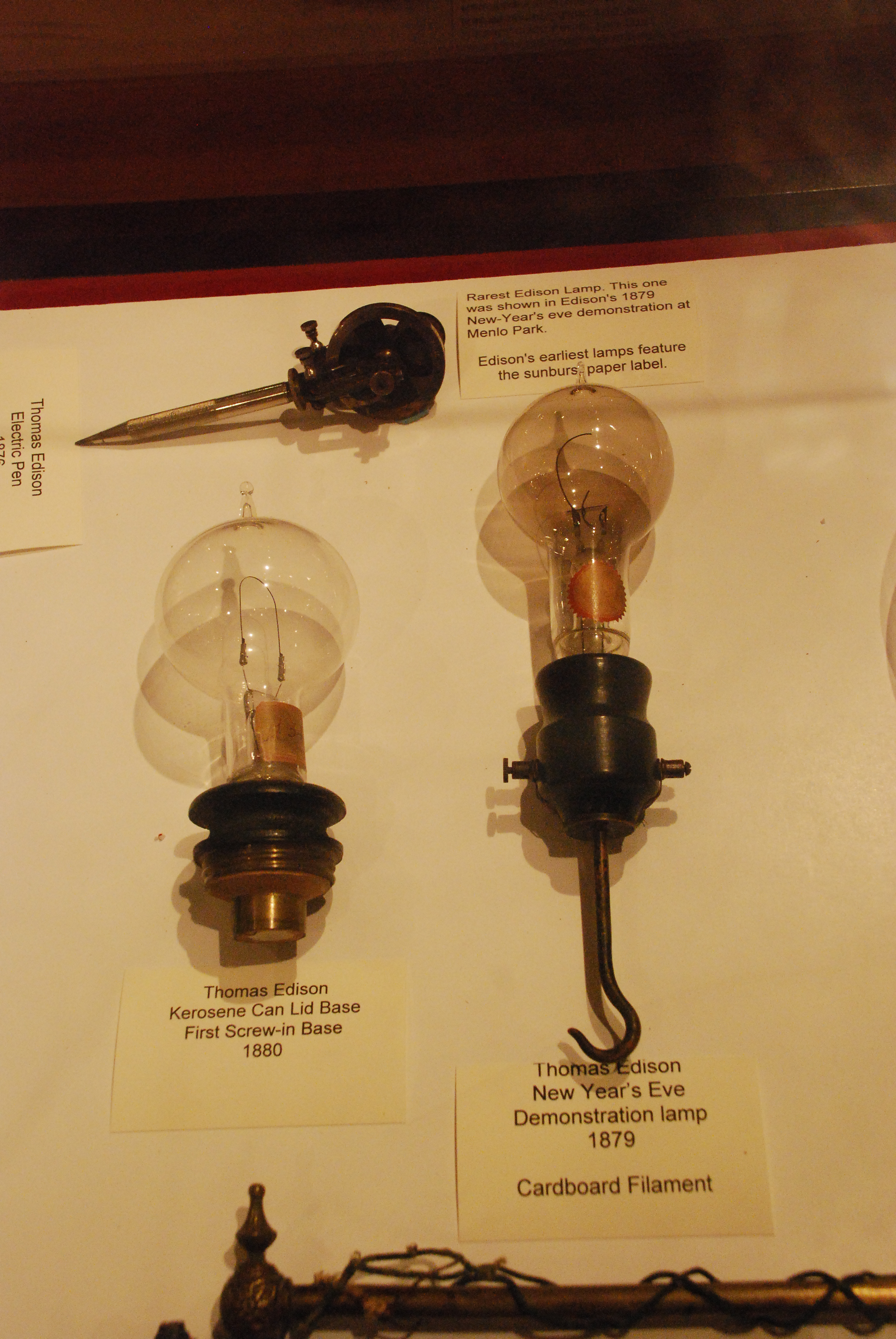
Edison 1879-1880 Lightbulbs

Early Static Electricity Instruments

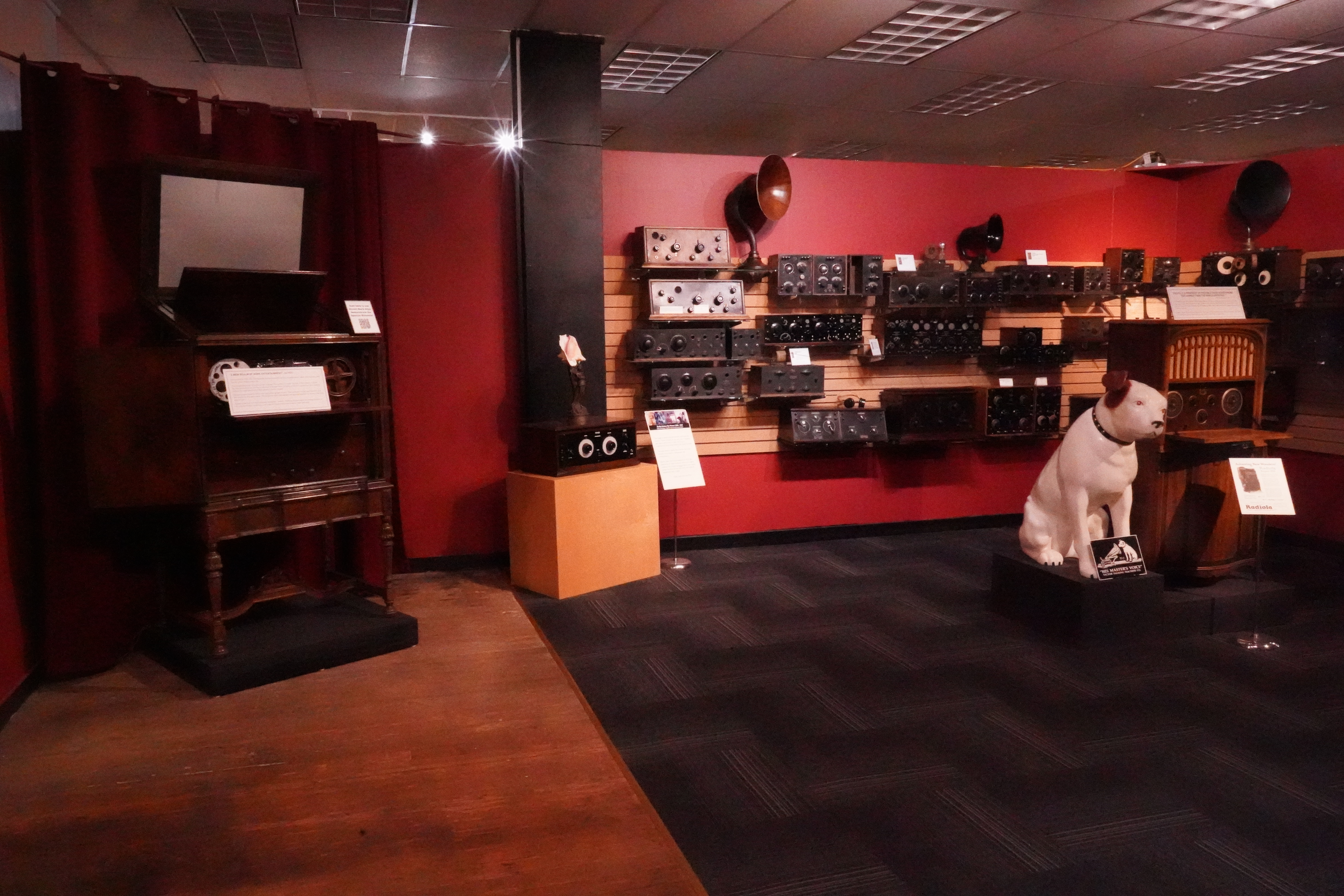
Radios and the Spartiin Visionola

== Notable exhibits ==
The museum hosts a variety of exhibits to include:

- an "War of the Currents" exhibit, featuring one of a kind artifacts,
- a reproduction of the radio room of the Titanic complete with original Marconi wireless apparatus,
- one of the largest collections of 19th century electromagnetic apparatus in the country, including early telegraph, telephone, electric motors, dynamos and induction coils,
- a selection of early nineteenth-century static electricity experimental equipment similar to that used by Benjamin Franklin and others to investigate static electricity,
- early wireless equipment originally from the Smithsonian's national radio museum, and
- a rotating gallery presently featuring magic lantern and motion picture technologies including a zoopraxiscope replica
Notable Exhibits at the Museum

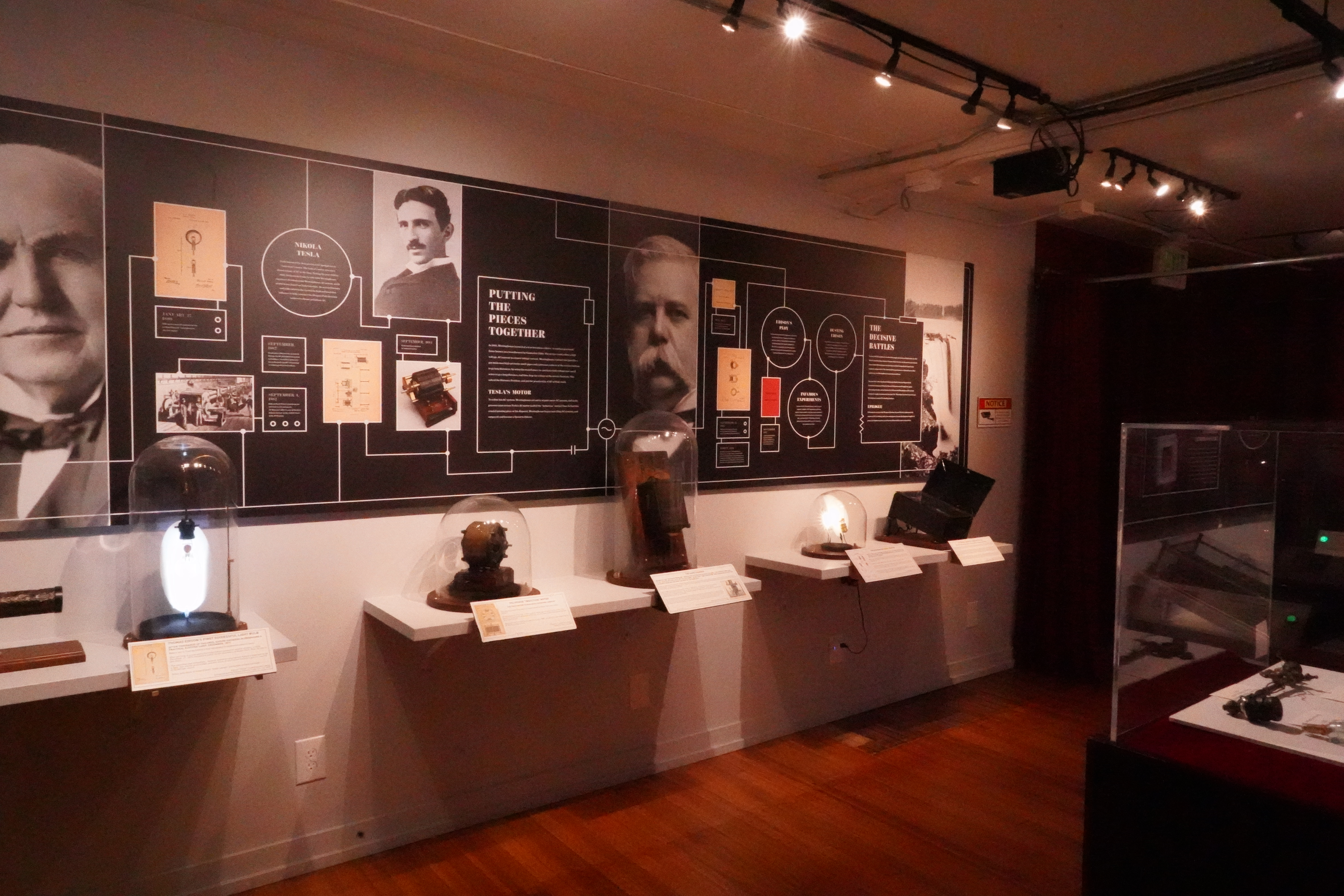
War of the Currents

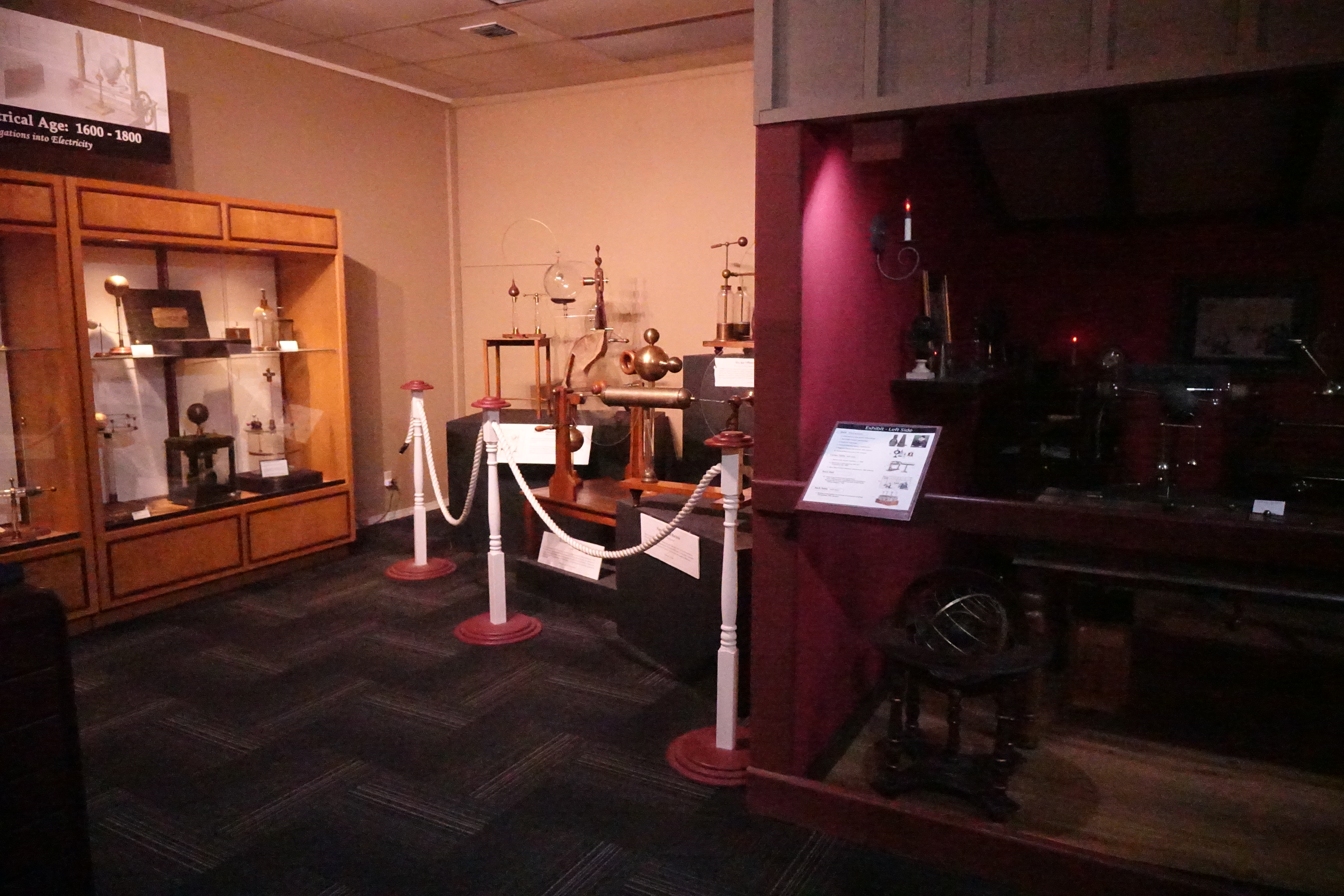
Spark Museum Antique Static Equipment

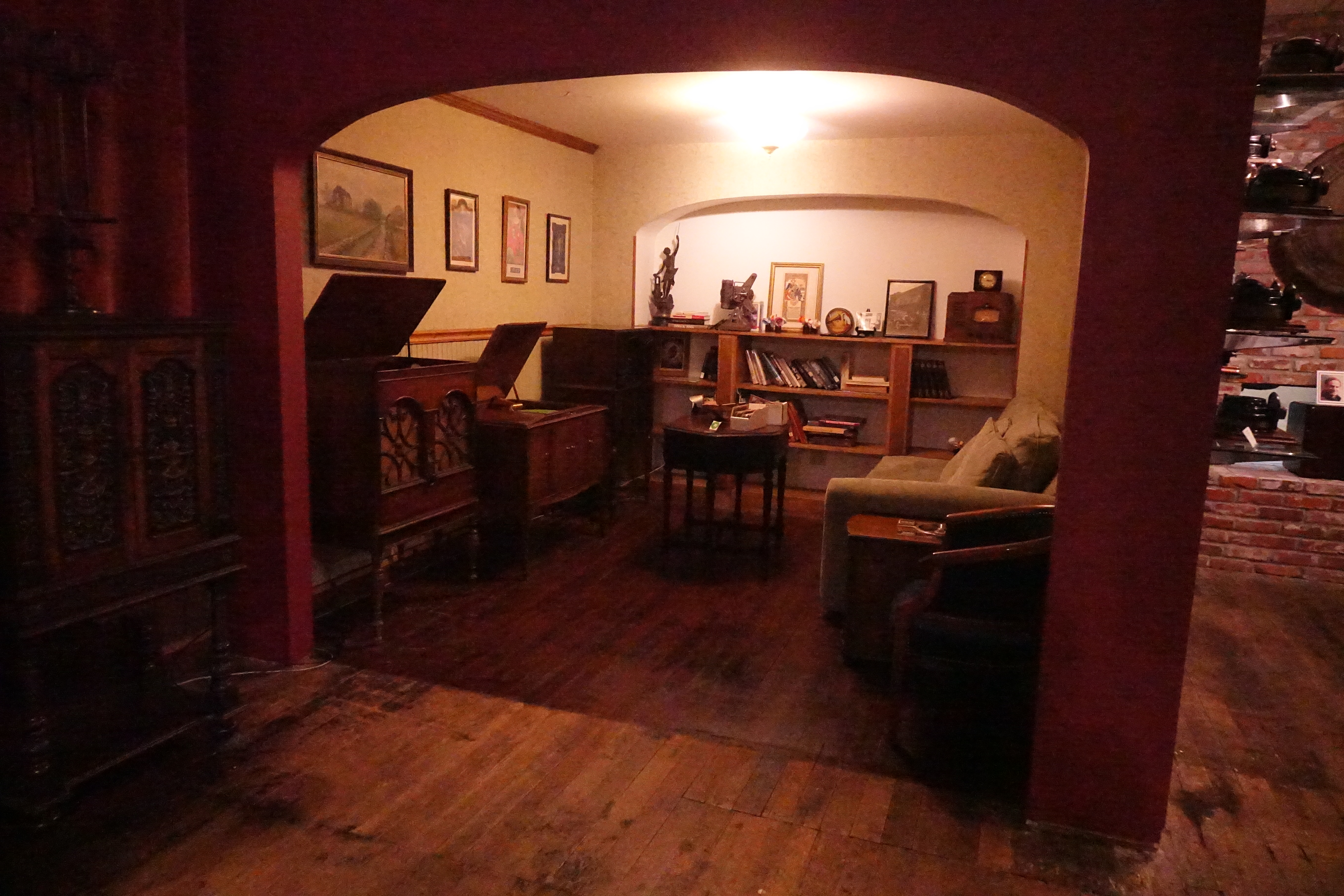
Radio Living Room

== Hands-on activities ==
Nearly every exhibit includes at least one interactive activity. For example, visitors can engage with exhibits in the static electricity lab, where visitors can explore friction and induction machines, Leyden jars, and magnetism. Visitors can also interact with a working replica of Nikola Tesla's Egg of Columbus and play the Theremin, an electronic instrument controlled without contact.

== Presentations and education ==
The museum hosts a variety of presentations and shows on the characteristics of electricity. In the static electricity lab, visitors can engage with the hair-raising Van de Graaf Generator. In addition to regular seasonal events such as the Halloween Haunted Lab, the museum hosts the MegaZapper Show, where visitors can see in operation one of the largest Tesla Coils in the country. At eight-feet tall, the coil generates which shoots 8-foot bolts of lightning. Select visitors can choose a close-up view in the safety of a viewing cage.

The museum's education program augments the regular science curriculum of public schools, private schools and home-school networks in Western Washington through assemblies, in-class science courses and special-focus tours. The community education program holds regular Science Saturday classes, summer camps, lectures and special events illuminating core facets of radio, electricity and physics. Hands-on classes include topics such as static electricity, magnetism, motors, circuits, and crystal radios.

The museum serves over 2,500 students annually through its programming.

Spark Museum Demonstrations

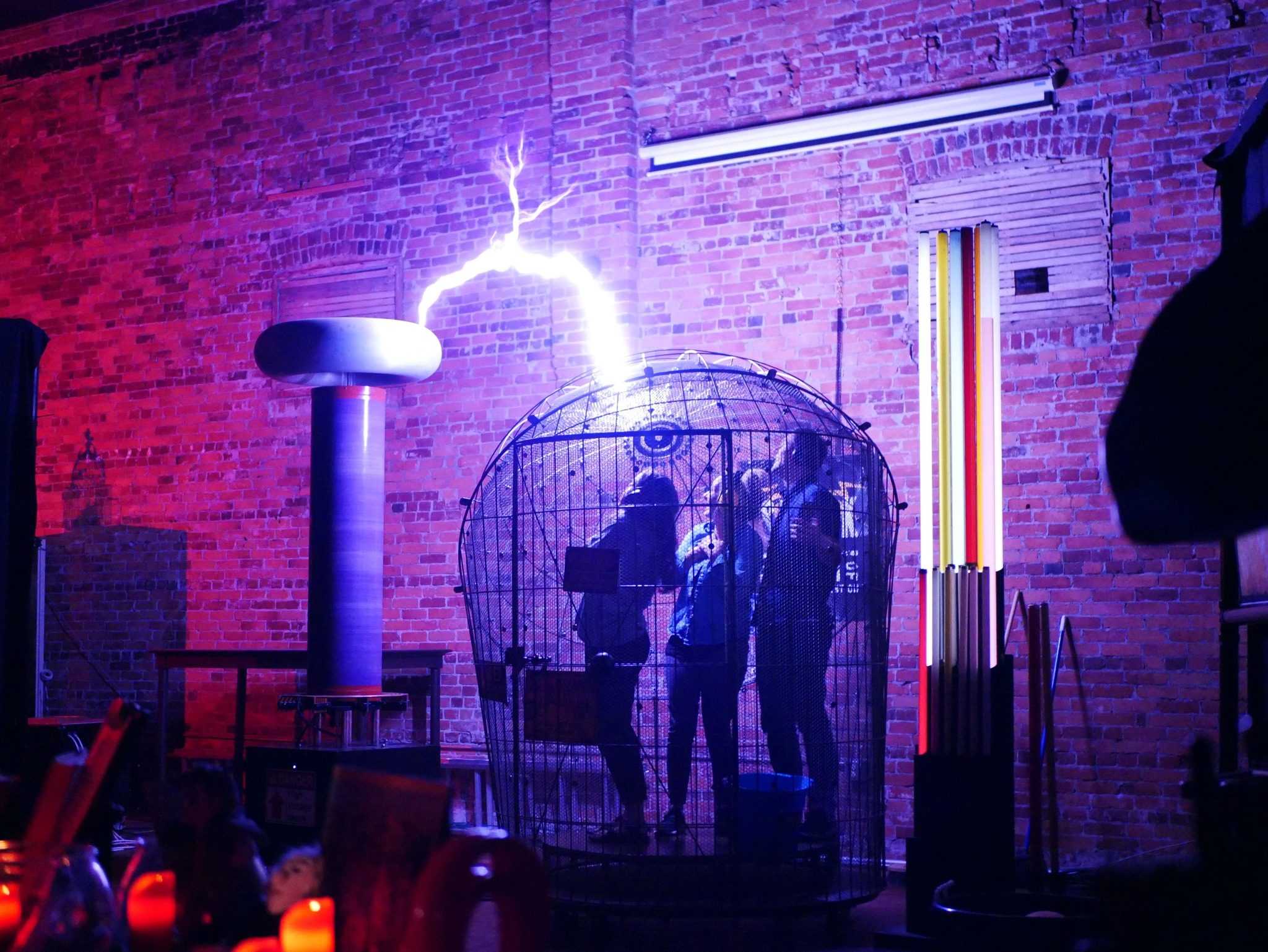
Megazapper Demonstration

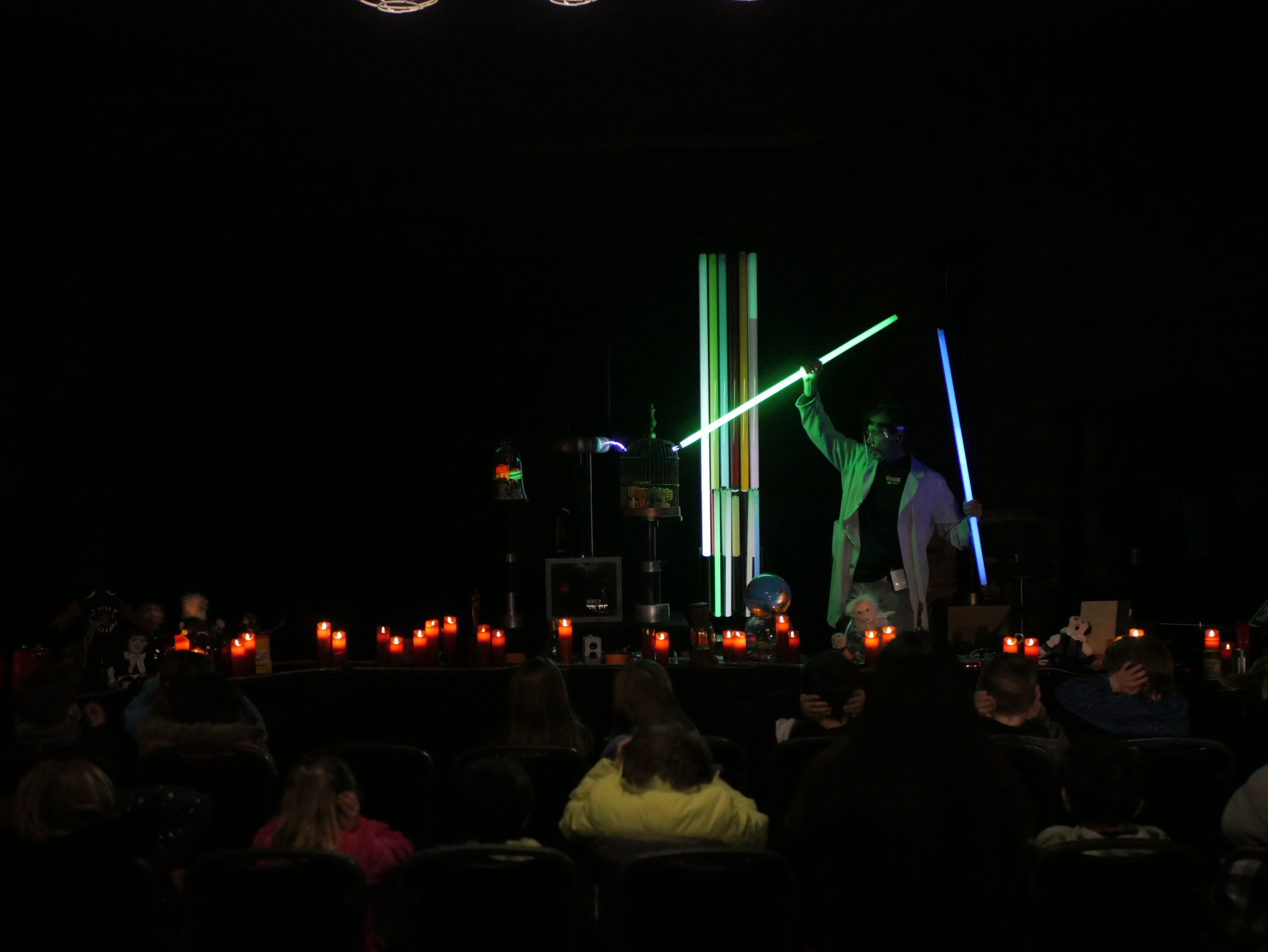
Tesla Demonstration

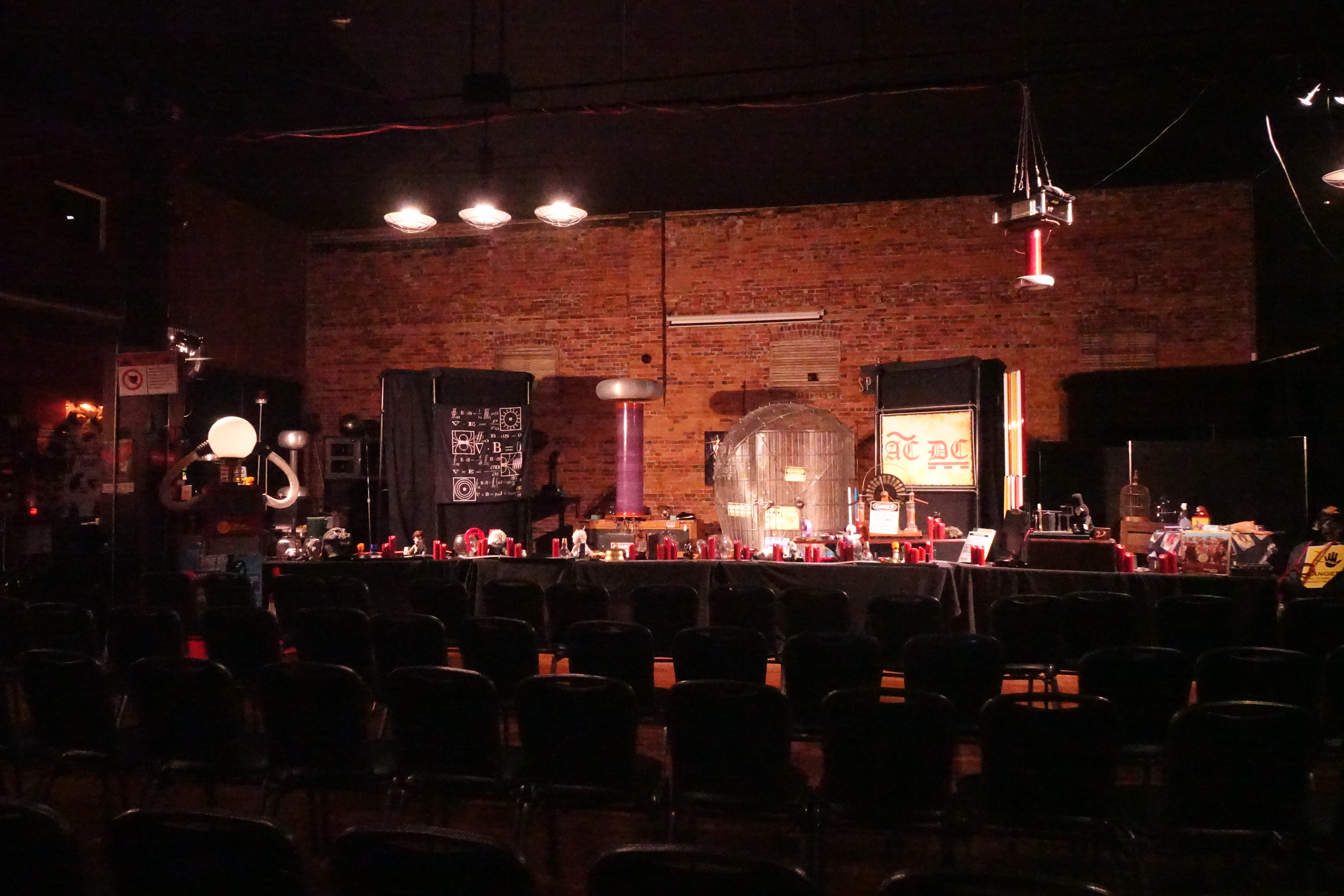
Spark Museum Auditorium

== See also ==
- 20th Century Technology Museum
- Museum of Radio and Technology
- Museum of Broadcast Communications
- National Radio Hall of Fame
