= Houston Fire Station No. 7 =

- U.S. National Register of Historic Places
- Recorded Texas Historic Landmark
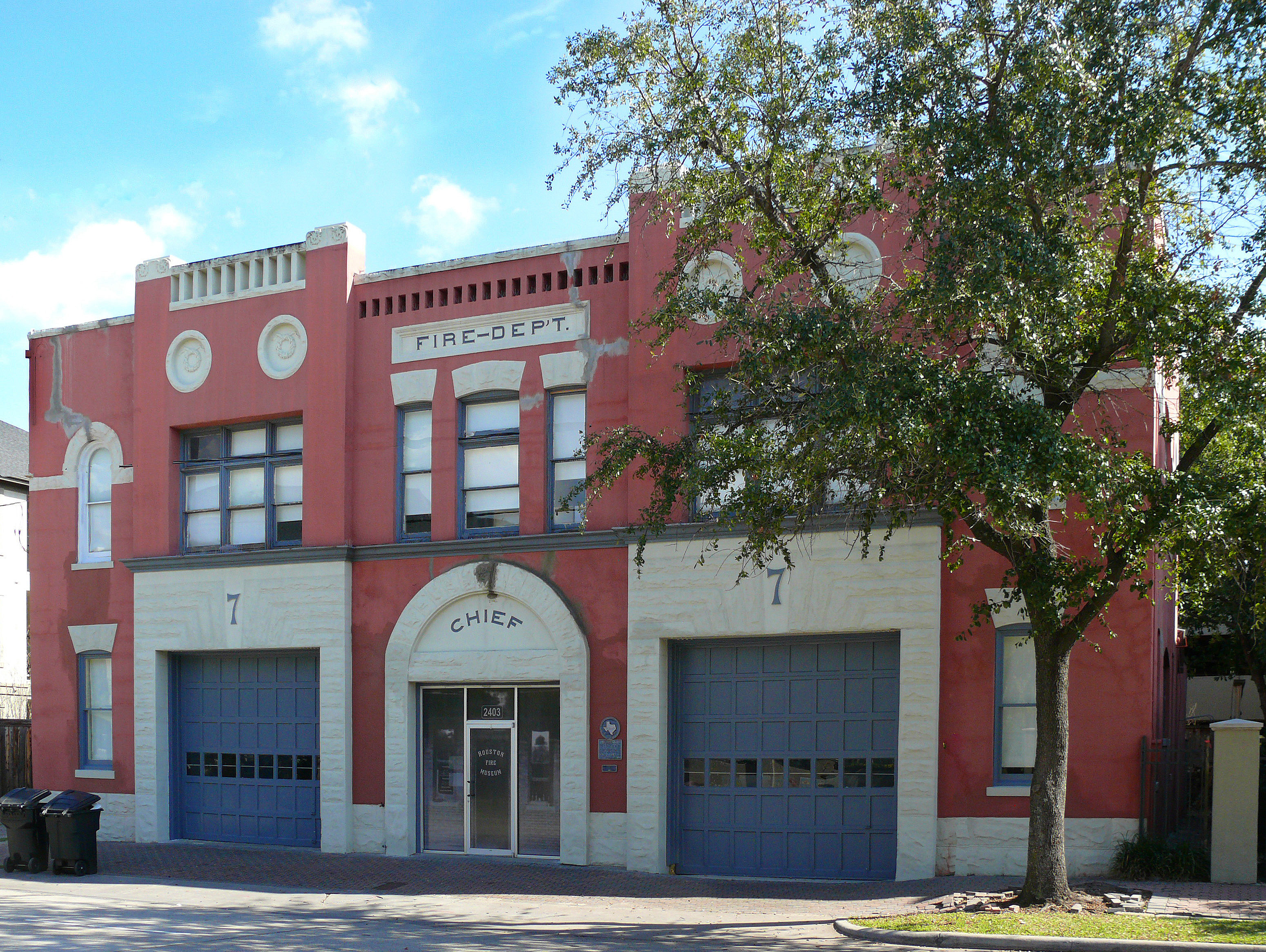
- The station's exterior in 2014

- Location within Texas Location within the United States
- Location: 2403 Milam St., Houston, Texas
- Coordinates: 29°44′50.7″N 95°22′29.3″W
- Area: less than one acre
- Built: 1898
- Built by: Cahill & Hunter
- Architect: Olle J. Lorehn
- Architectural style: Romanesque
- NRHP reference No.: 86000798
- RTHL No.: 10694

Significant dates
- Added to NRHP: April 17, 1986
- Designated RTHL: 1988

Houston Fire Station No. 7 is a historic fire station located at 2403 Milam Street in Houston, Texas. It was listed on the National Register of Historic Places on April 17, 1986. The fire station was built in 1898 and opened the next year as the first paid station in Houston. It was active until a replacement was built 1969. The building has been used as the Houston Fire Museum after a renovation, started in 1980.

== See also ==
- National Register of Historic Places listings in Harris County, Texas
