= Museum of Radio and Technology =

Museum in Huntington, West Virginia, U.S.

Coordinates: 38°24′04″N 82°28′23″W

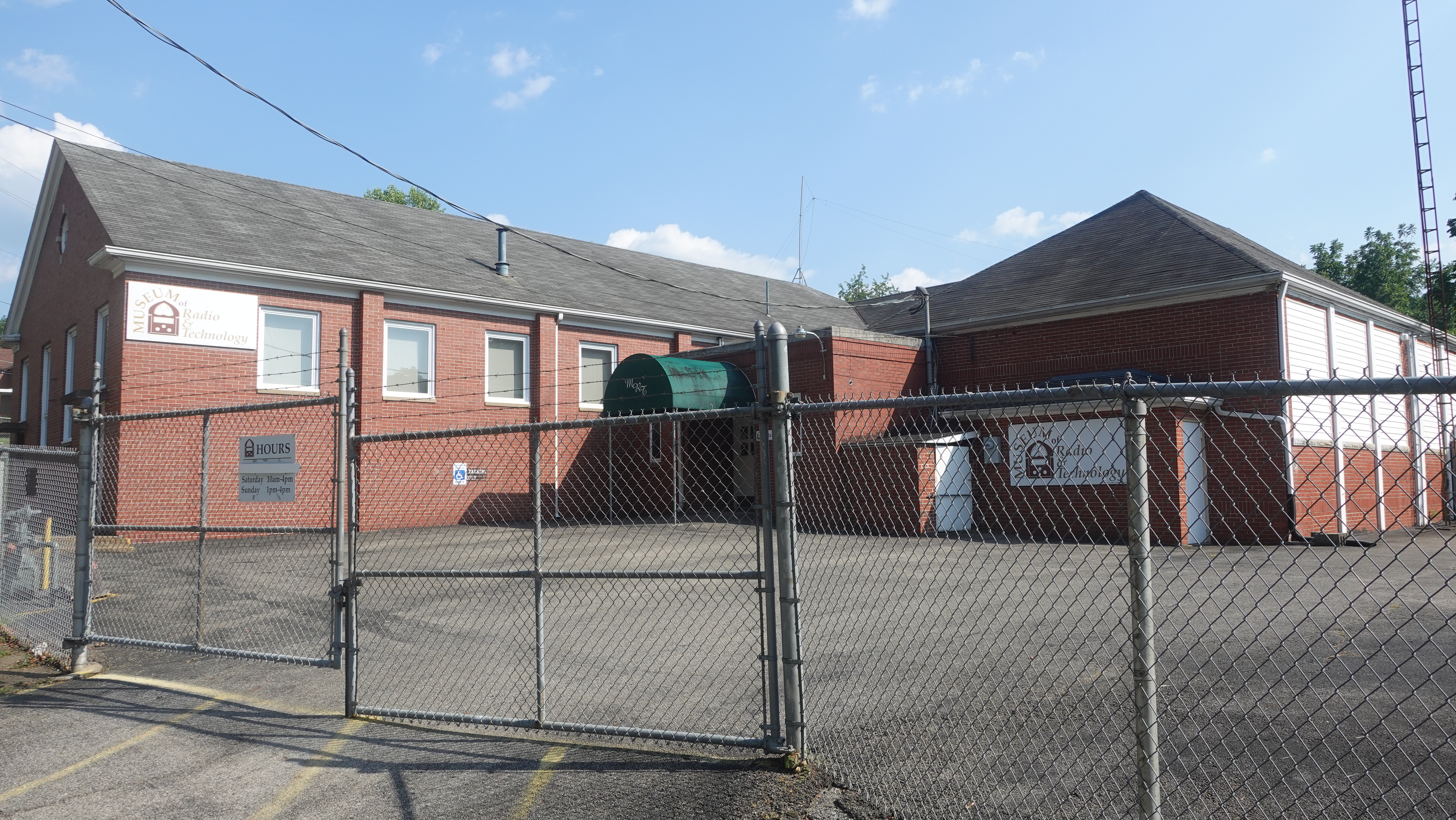
- Museum of Radio and Technology in 2024.
- Established: 1991; 35 years ago
- Location: 1640 Florence Ave, Huntington, West Virginia, 25701
- Type: Electronic Communication and Entertainment
- President: Geoff Bourne
- Employees: 8
- Website: Official Website

The Museum of Radio and Technology is a museum in Huntington, West Virginia.

The museum covers the birth and growth of electronic communication and entertainment and includes hands-on exhibits. Admission is free.

== History ==
In 1991, the Museum of Radio and Technology opened in the former Harveytown Elementary School, within the Harveytown neighborhood of Huntington.

== Features ==
- 1920s-1930s radio shop: The tour begins with mechanical music reproduction in the pre-electrical era. Learn how wireless communication began, with a working "crystal radio" and a rotary spark gap demonstrator.
- 1940s-1950s showroom: Visit a typical radio and television store showroom of the era. There are tube and transistor radios, television sets, wire and tape recorders, and vintage turntables and tuners. A comprehensive display of 1950s toys from the A.C. Gilbert Company includes Erector sets, chemistry sets, microscopes and the Gilbert Atomic Energy Lab.
- Computer display: A "timeline" of desktop computers from the IMSAI to the Mac and Lisa. See a 7-megabyte hard drive that's as big as a suitcase.
- Gift shop: Clothing, toys, books and magazines, antique and reproduction radios, even some floor-model wind-up Victrola phonographs for sale, with records.
- Ham and short wave radios: Short-wave receivers and transmitters as used by "hams" and hobbyists. The "Big H's": Hallicrafters, Hammarlund, Heath and National (OK, that's an N, but it looks like an H.)
- Military communication display: Contains various military radio and communication gear.
- Modern ham radios: Amateur radio station WV8MRT may be operated by any licensed visitor.
- Radio classroom: Facilities for teaching about electronics, including test equipment and illustrative circuit demonstrators.
- Harveytown School: Meet the children who sat in classes when our building was an elementary school, from the 1920s to the 1970s.
- Radio DJ studio: A working broadcast studio as used by platter-spinning disc jockeys from the early 1950s to the late 1990s. Sit down at the console and see how it feels.
- Broadcasting room: Radio and TV broadcast equipment including a massive 5000-watt AM transmitter from the 1930s. Recorders, cameras, control boards and those famous "N-B-C" chimes.
- West Virginia Broadcasting Hall of Fame: Honoring West Virginians who have figured in the history of broadcasting.
- The Library: Books, magazines and other publications about radio and electronics. We have a near-complete collection of the famous H.W. Sams and Ryder service manuals for the use of our Members.
- The Auditorium and Stage: Auction sales and Swap Meets are held here three times per year. Our stage presents the annual Hall of Fame ceremony as well as Radio Dinner Theater. These facilities and the adjacent kitchen are available for private event rentals.

=== West Virginia Broadcasting Hall of Fame ===
One major section of the Museum of Radio and Technology is dedicated to the West Virginia Broadcasting Hall of Fame. West Virginia boasts a large number of persons who were instrumental in the initial days of broadcasting history. Pictures, a story book, and a wall of names provide an interesting area of the West Virginia Radio and Technology Museum for visitors.

== See also ==
- List of museums in Huntington, West Virginia
- 20th Century Technology Museum
- American Museum of Radio and Electricity
- Military Wireless Museum in the Midlands
- Museum of Broadcast Communications
- Paley Center for Media
- Pavek Museum of Broadcasting
- Radio Hall of Fame
