= Gugong (disambiguation) =

Gugong (Chinese: 故宫; pinyin: Gùgōng) is the Chinese name for the Forbidden City in Beijing.

== "Former palace" ==
Gugong literally means "former palace", and can also refer to:

- Mukden Palace in Shenyang, also known as "the Shenyang Gugong"
- National Palace Museum in Taipei, also known as "the Taipei Gugong"
- Hong Kong Palace Museum in Hong Kong, also known as "the Hong Kong Gugong"
- Ming Palace, Nanjing, also known as "the Ming Gugong" or "the Nanjing Gugong"
- Gugong (film), a 2005 large scale documentary series about the Forbidden City produced by China Central Television, directed by famous Chinese director Zhou Bing.

== As name ==
- Gugong Danfu, Zhou Dynasty ancestor

== See also ==
- Forbidden City (disambiguation)
