= The Cradle, Texas =

Birthplace of the Daughters of the Republic of Texas

The Cradle
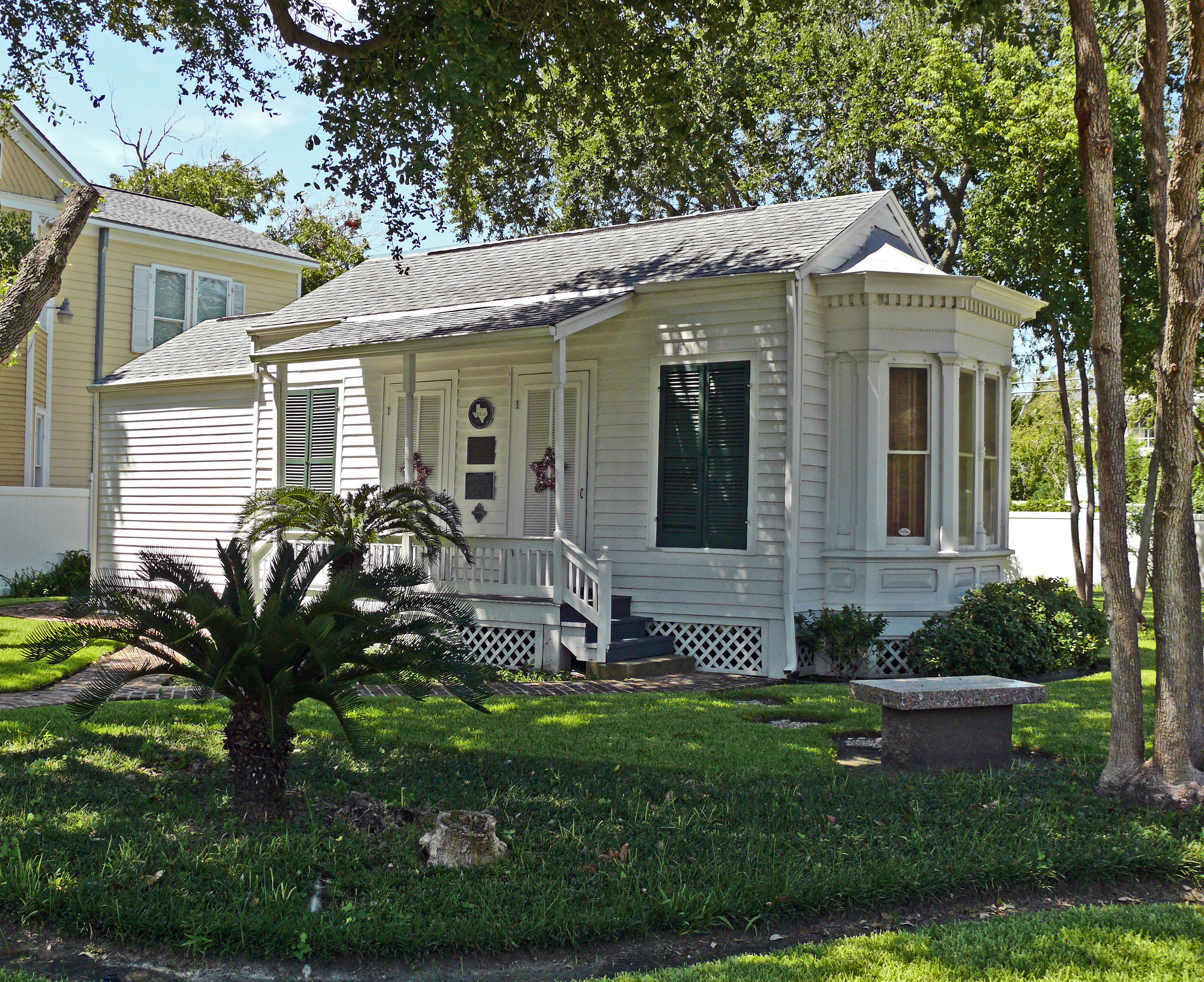
- The Cradle in 2012
- Interactive map of the The Cradle area

General information
- Status: Active
- Type: Law office Law library Clubhouse
- Architectural style: Victorian
- Location: 2902 Avenue O ½ Galveston, Texas, U.S.
- Coordinates: 29.2914°N 94.7969°W
- Owner: Ballinger family (former); Daughters of the Republic of Texas (current)

The Cradle is a historic Victorian law office and library on Galveston Island in Galveston, Texas, that was the birthplace of the Daughters of the Republic of Texas. It is operated as a museum by the Sidney Sherman Chapter of the Daughters of the Republic of Texas.

== History ==
The Cradle was built on Galveston Island in 1857 by Judge William Pitt Ballinger on the grounds of his Southern Colonial estate, known as The Oaks, and served as his private law office and later as the Ballinger family's library. The building, done in the Victorian style, consists of two rooms divided by a wall, two front doors, a small iron heater, four large windows, and a large bay window.

In 1891, the Daughters of the Republic of Texas was founded in the building by two members of the Ballinger family: Betty Eve Ballinger and Hally Ballinger Bryan Perry. Perry renamed the building "The Cradle" in 1936. The Galveston chapter of the Daughters of the Republic of Texas, named the Sidney Sherman Chapter, was established as the first chapter of the society and was headquartered in the building.

A historical marker was placed on the grounds in 1962 by the Texas Historical Commission.

The Cradle underwent restoration between 1993 and 1995 and was furnished with antiques to reflect its original 1800s interiors.

The Sidney Sherman DRT Chapter operates the building as a museum and provides private tours, made by appointment.
