= Sons of the Republic of Texas =

Patriotic organization

The Sons of the Republic of Texas is a patriotic organization dedicated to perpetuating the memory of the founding families and soldiers of the Republic of Texas. It was established in 1893.

== See also ==
- Daughters of the Republic of Texas
