= 20th Century Technology Museum =

Museum in Wharton, Texas, United States

Coordinates: 29°18′33.5″N 96°06′01.4″W

The 20th Century Technology Museum
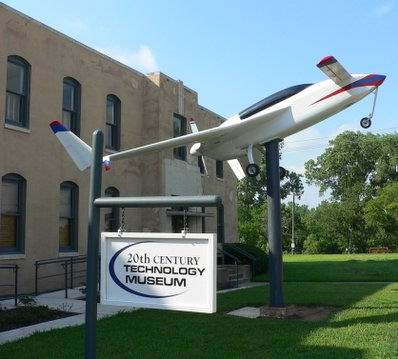
- Location: Wharton, Texas, United States
- Collections: radios, but also has a few experimental aircraft, including an ornithopter and a Rutan VariEze.Major displays in the museum include: Radios; Phonographs and a jukebox; Televisions; Arcade games; Home appliances, such as early refrigerators; Farm equipment; Telephones; Typewriters; Computers; Electronics; Cameras; Aircraft

The 20th Century Technology Museum is located in Wharton, Texas, United States, and displays examples of technology from the 20th century. The museum is a non-profit organization and opened its gallery in July 2005 on the first floor of the former Wharton County Jail, which was constructed in 1888.

The museum's collection consists mostly of smaller items, such as radios, but also has a few experimental aircraft, including an ornithopter and a Rutan VariEze, which is displayed in front of the museum. Many items on display in the museum are in working condition and may either be demonstrated to visitors or available for hands-on operation (including most of the arcade games on display).

Major displays in the museum include:

- Radios
- Phonographs and a jukebox
- Televisions
- Arcade games
- Home appliances, such as early refrigerators
- Farm equipment
- Telephones
- Typewriters
- Computers
- Electronics
- Cameras
- Aircraft

== See also ==
- List of museums in Central Texas
- Museum of Radio and Technology
- Museum of Broadcast Communications
- American Museum of Radio and Electricity
