= Houston Fire Museum =

Fire museum in Houston

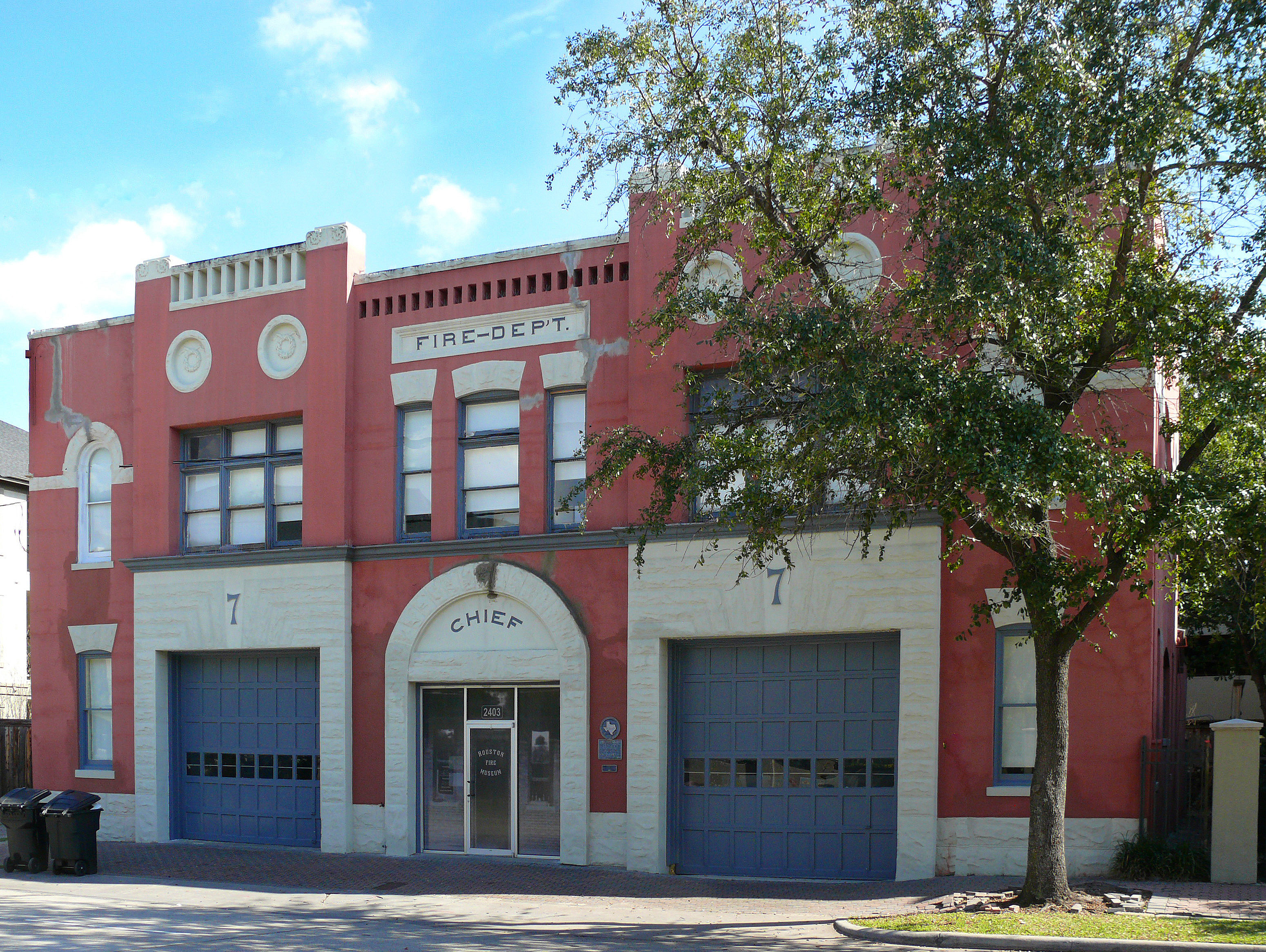
- Houston Fire Museum, formerly Fire Station No. 7
- Established: 1982
- Location: 2403 Milam Street; Houston, Texas 77006
- Coordinates: 29.7474°N 95.3748°W
- Type: Fire museum
- President: Tom McDonald
- Website: houstonfiremuseum.org

The Houston Fire Museum, also known as the Fire Museum of Houston, is located in the Midtown District of Houston, Texas. The museum contains interactive exhibits and displays featuring antique and modern firefighting paraphernalia, as well as educating its visitors in fire safety and prevention. The museum's building, which was originally home to the Houston Fire Department's Fire Station No. 7, is listed on the National Register of Historic Places and is a Recorded Texas Historic Landmark.

== Building history ==
The building which currently houses the Houston Fire Museum was originally Fire Station No. 7, Houston's oldest fire house. Designed in the Romanesque style by Olle J. Lorehn, the two-story brick building was completed in January 1899 and features rusticated stone details, a five bay front with Central arched entry flanked by two apparatus bay entries and unique parapet details. It was updated in the 1920s to accommodate motorized vehicles. Used as a fire station until 1968, the building sat empty after Fire Station No. 7 was relocated until its complete restoration in 1981 in preparation for the opening of the museum.

== Exhibits and collection ==
The museum's exhibits highlight the evolution of firefighting technology as well as local fire service history and features interactive elements including a fire pole which visitors can slide down and a fire engine cab. The collection comprises both antique and modern firefighter uniforms, uniform emblems, and equipment; historic fire marks; and photographs from local and national fire service events including the 1947 Texas City disaster. The collection also features firefighting vehicles such as a hand-drawn and hand-powered pumper, a horse-drawn steam engine, and a 1912 American Automatic ware tower with an American LaFrance engine, the only vehicle of its type ever used by the HFD.

== New museum ==
According to the Houston Fire Museum's official website, the construction of a new fire museum is currently in the planning stages. This new museum will be modeled after the old Central Fire Station and will emphasize fire safety and prevention education over firefighting history.
