= Bay Area Museum =

Coordinates: 29.5687°N 95.0689°W

- Established: 1901
- Location: Clear Lake Park
- Type: Local history museum
- Key holdings: Mementos of the U.S. space program
- Founder: Maggie Plumb DeNike
- President: Sharon Dillard

The Bay Area Museum is located in Clear Lake Park in Seabrook, Texas, US, part of the Clear Lake area, Bay Area Houston. The museum displays changing exhibits that reflect the history of the area, as well as conserving memorabilia from the Lunar Rendezvous festival, an annual celebration of the region's link to space exploration due to the presence of the Johnson Space Center.

== History ==
Originally located on the corners of Houston and Moody Streets in Webster, Texas, the building that is now home to the Bay Area Museum was erected by the Webster Presbyterian Church in 1901 as a replacement for its original sanctuary, which was destroyed by the 1900 Galveston hurricane. In 1936, the church added an annex that included a stage, meeting hall, and kitchen. For many years this was the only church in Webster, and the site of many community events.

After Webster Presbyterian Church built more modern facilities, the old building fell into disrepair. In 1979, Maggie Plumb DeNike, founder of the Lunar Rendezvous festival and Chairman of the festival's board, appeared with Chamber of Commerce representatives and local attorneys before the Harris County Commission to request approval to move the historic church building to the park grounds. The building was purchased from the Webster Presbyterian Church and moved to Clear Lake Park, 6.5 miles (10.5 km) from its original location. When restoration of the church was completed, the museum was formally dedicated on July 17, 1984. Sharon Dillard served as founding president, from 1984 to 1986. Among other artifacts, the museum's collections include mementos of the U.S. space program given by Lady Bird Johnson and other donors.

== Administration ==
Initially, the museum was governed by a President and Board of Trustees. At present, administration and maintenance is handled through the Bay Area Museum Guild, an organization with nearly 200 members. The Guild is dedicated to promoting awareness of the museum, its facilities, functions and needs throughout the community.

== Events and programs ==
The sanctuary and annex are available for small private events such as weddings and Museum Guild meetings and functions, while hosting the annual Lunar Rendezvous festival. The Lunar Rendezvous festival, established in 1965, has been celebrated at the museum since its 1984 founding, and is an ongoing source of museum funding.
