= Sam Houston Regional Library and Research Center =

Library in Liberty County, Texas

- 30.0986°N 94.7625°W
- Location: Liberty County, Texas, United States
- Established: 1977

Other information
- Director: Texas State Library and Archives Commission

The Sam Houston Regional Library and Research Center is located in unincorporated Liberty County, Texas. The 17,600 square feet (1,640 m^{2}) facility is located 3 miles (4.8 km) north of Liberty, 200 miles (320 km) east of Downtown Austin and 41 miles (66 km) northeast of Downtown Houston. It is owned and operated by the Texas State Library and Archives Commission and contains local government records, publications, manuscripts, newspapers, maps, artifacts, and photographs documenting the history of the Atascosito region of Southeast Texas, comprising ten counties: Chambers, Hardin, Jasper, Jefferson, Liberty, Newton, Orange, Polk, San Jacinto, and Tyler. Visitors may access the collections for genealogical and historical research through the research library. In 2018, the center's museum re-opened after extensive renovations. It features the exhibit, Atascosito: The History of Southeast Texas, chronicling the region's past through dynamic displays of artifacts, photographs, maps, and historical documents. The museum showcases the developments of the area, including its river economy, timber industry, rice agriculture, and expansive oil fields, while also sharing stories of the thousands of years of growth and movement of people through what has become the 10-county region. The campus also includes the Jean and Price Daniel Home and Archives, which preserves and displays the library, archives, furniture, and mementos documenting the Daniels' lives and years of public service, including his time as governor. It was patterned after the Greek Revival style Texas Governor's Mansion.

The Center features four additional historic buildings that have been relocated to the grounds: the Gillard-Duncan House (1848), built by Dr. Edward J. and Emma DeBlanc Gillard, is one of the oldest extant homes in Southeast Texas; the Norman House (ca. 1883) features exhibits in a historical house setting; St. Stephen's Episcopal Church (1898) served as a place of worship for nearly a century; and the Hull-Daisetta Rotary Building (ca. 1930), built by the Rotary Club of Hull-Daisetta, is one of the first and only buildings constructed and owned by a Rotary club. As of the fall of 2023, tours of the Hull-Daisetta Rotary Building are self-guided and do not require an appointment. Tours of the other buildings are available only by appointment. As of 2023, the Center recommended booking tours at least two weeks in advance, with tours with less notice accommodated based on staff availability.

== History ==
Governor and Mrs. Price Daniel donated 114 acres (46 ha) of land for the purpose of establishing a library on September 27, 1973. Construction began in the fall of 1975; by then $700,000 had been raised through private donations. The library opened on May 14, 1977. The library commission selected the Liberty area as the site of its archive because Liberty County is the site of Atascocito, a former Spanish outpost that became the seat of government of a ten-county area that formed in 1826; the settlement's name changed to Liberty in 1831. The counties were all or partially within the Atascosito-Liberty District.
