= John C. Freeman Weather Museum =

Weather museum in Houston, Texas

Coordinates: 29°43′39″N 95°23′05″W

- Established: 1987
- Location: Houston Museum District, Houston, Texas
- Visitors: 500,000 in region since opening
- Director: Jill F. Hasling
- Website: Weather Museum

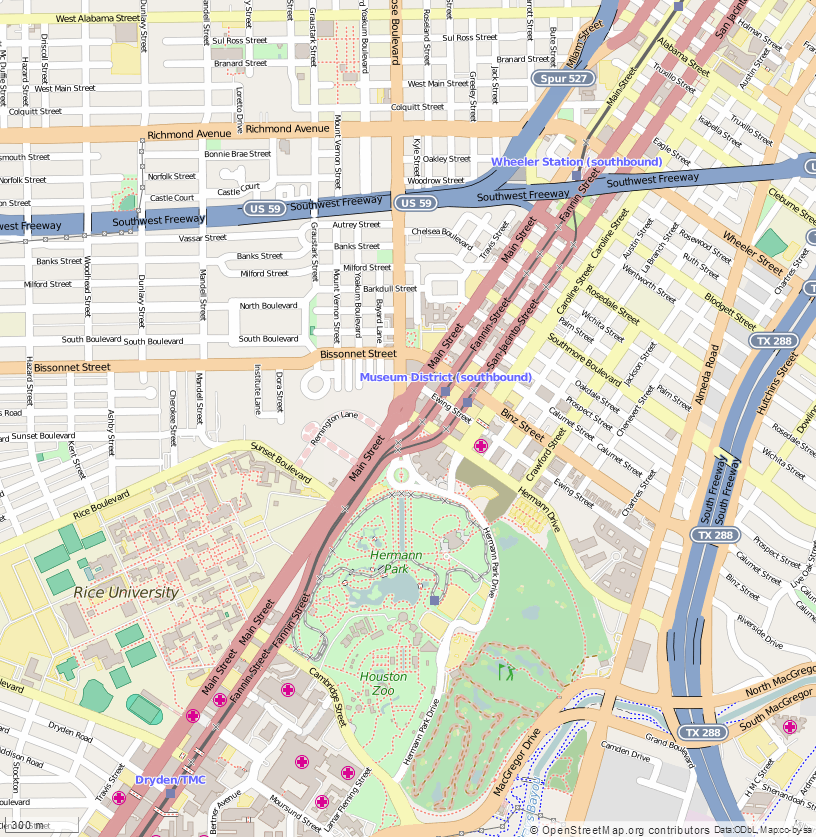
Location within Houston Museum District

The John C. Freeman Weather Museum is a weather museum in the museum district of Houston, Texas. It opened in 1987 along with the Weather Research Center. The Weather Museum is known for its weather camps, especially during Summer,

== Recent history ==
The museum is temporarily closed for relocation. In 2006, the museum moved to a new location at 5104 Caroline after being previously located on Audley Street. In 2007, Radar The Weather Dog became a part of the Weather Museum staff after local television station KPRC-TV relieved him of his duties.

== Permanent Exhibits ==
- Weather Studio- A room where visitors and students in the weather camps may record a video of themselves as a local correspondent of The Weather Channel. It features a green screen for demonstrating principles of weather broadcasting.
- Climates of the World- Visitors can learn about the different climates around the world through use of terrariums that house numerous animals from around the world. Visitors can also learn about El Nino and La Nina.
- Hurricanes, Cyclones, and Typhoons- Visitors can view satellite and radar images of Hurricanes that have affected the Gulf Coast, including Hurricanes Katrina, Rita, and Ike. Visitors can also learn what effects a storm surge would have on the Houston area, were a Category 5 Hurricane to make landfall in the area.
- Weather Wizard Corner- Visitors can participate in, or watch, weather experiments performed by Weather Museum staff.
- Tornadoes- Visitors can learn about Tornadoes, about the Enhanced Fujita Scale, and how to stay safe when a tornado does strike. Visitors to this section can also play a weather trivia game.
- Tornado Chamber- A tornado simulator built by the National Weather Service in Corpus Christi. Visitors will see how a tornado forms through the condensation of water vapor during quasi-adiabatic expansion, and touch the simulation while learning how a funnel forms.
- Video Room- A room where visitors can view video of classic and current tornado and hurricane footage. Visitors can also learn about the basics of weather.
- Weather History- A room with artifacts from the past hundreds of years of weather forecasting, and how weather forecasting technology has evolved.
- Weather Sphere- A 3-D globe where visitors can view satellite images of current weather conditions and past Hurricanes, plate tectonics, satellite tracking, and the planets of the Solar System.
