= Tate-Senftenberg-Brandon House =

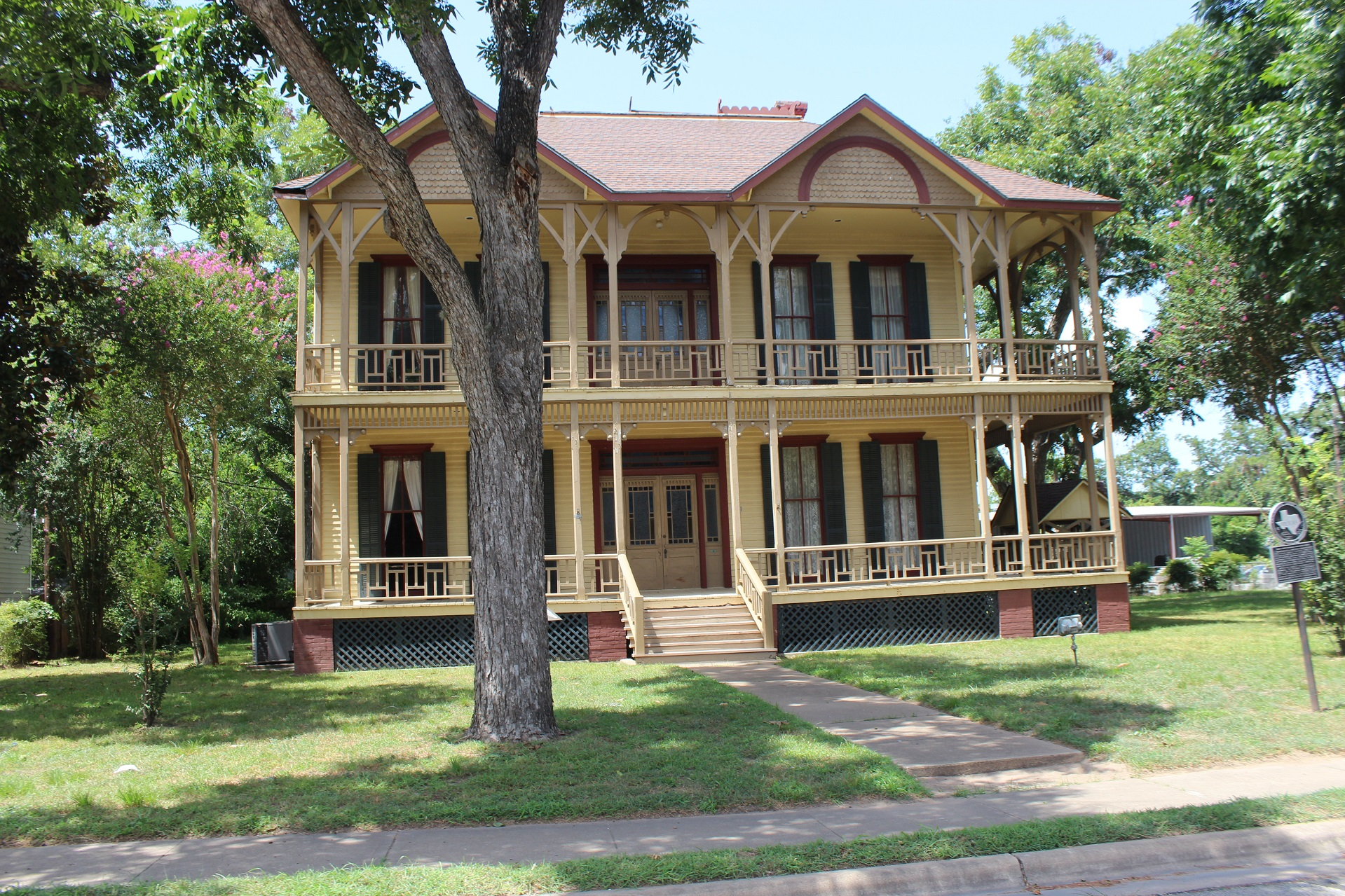
- Tate-Senftenberg-Brandon House

- Location within Texas Location within the United States
- Interactive map showing the location of Tate-Senftenberg-Brandon House
- 29°42′21″N 96°32′23″W
- Location: 616 Walnut Street, Columbus, Texas

History
- Built: 1867

Site notes
- Architectural style: Victorian/Regional Vernacular/Eastlake Style

Recorded Texas Historic Landmark
- Designated: April 10, 1969
- Reference no.: 5205

The Tate-Senftenberg-Brandon House is a historic house in Columbus, Texas.

The home was constructed in 1867 as a single story frame residence by local entrepreneur Phocion Tate. Tate's widow sold the house in 1887 to Adolph Senftenberg, a local merchant who added the second floor and Eastlake style porches. The property was sold again in 1900 to Kenneth Brandon who added modern amenities to the property.

The house operated as a historic house museum from 1968 to 2006. The home is the birthplace of former Dallas mayor, J. Waddy Tate.

The house now has a restaurant operating within it on the first floor and basement since August 2023. The name of the restaurant is “Lamberto’s Brandon House Bistro.” It is an Italian cuisine. There is also a real estate company on the top floor.
