= The Forbidden Kingdom (soundtrack) =

Film score by David Buckley
- Released: July 22, 2008 (CD); July 29, 2008 (iTunes)
- Genre: Film score
- Length: 66:28
- Label: Lionsgate
- Producer: Harry Gregson-Williams

The Forbidden Kingdom is the score to the 2008 film directed by Rob Minkoff. The score was composed by David Buckley. It was released by Lionsgate on July 22, 2008 on CD, and on July 29, 2008 on iTunes.

== Track listing ==
All music is composed by David Buckley.

| No. | Title | Length |
|---|---|---|
| 1. | "The Mountain of Fruit and Flowers" | 1:42 |
| 2. | "The Peach Banquet" | 1:44 |
| 3. | "Monkey Business" | 4:29 |
| 4. | "China Begins" | 4:11 |
| 5. | "Hops' Shop" | 3:05 |
| 6. | "J and J Temple Fight" | 5:32 |
| 7. | "The Legend of the Temple Staff" | 1:58 |
| 8. | "Two Tigers - Two Masters" | 2:49 |
| 9. | "Tea House Fight" | 5:07 |
| 10. | "The Tyranny of War" | 5:21 |
| 11. | "Don't Forget to Breathe" | 0:52 |
| 12. | "Ni Chang and Her Cult Killers" | 4:32 |
| 13. | "Drunken Master Wounded" | 3:39 |
| 14. | "The Seeker of the Prophecy" | 5:04 |
| 15. | "Let the Journey Begin" | 2:37 |
| 16. | "Monkey King Released" | 2:23 |
| 17. | "Battle of the Bride" | 2:55 |
| 18. | "Her Destiny Was Written" | 4:11 |
| 19. | "As One Tale Ends..." | 2:45 |
| 20. | "...Another Tale Begins" | 1:34 |
| Total length: | | 66:28 |
