= Forbidden Gardens =

Coordinates: 29°48′24″N 95°46′37″W

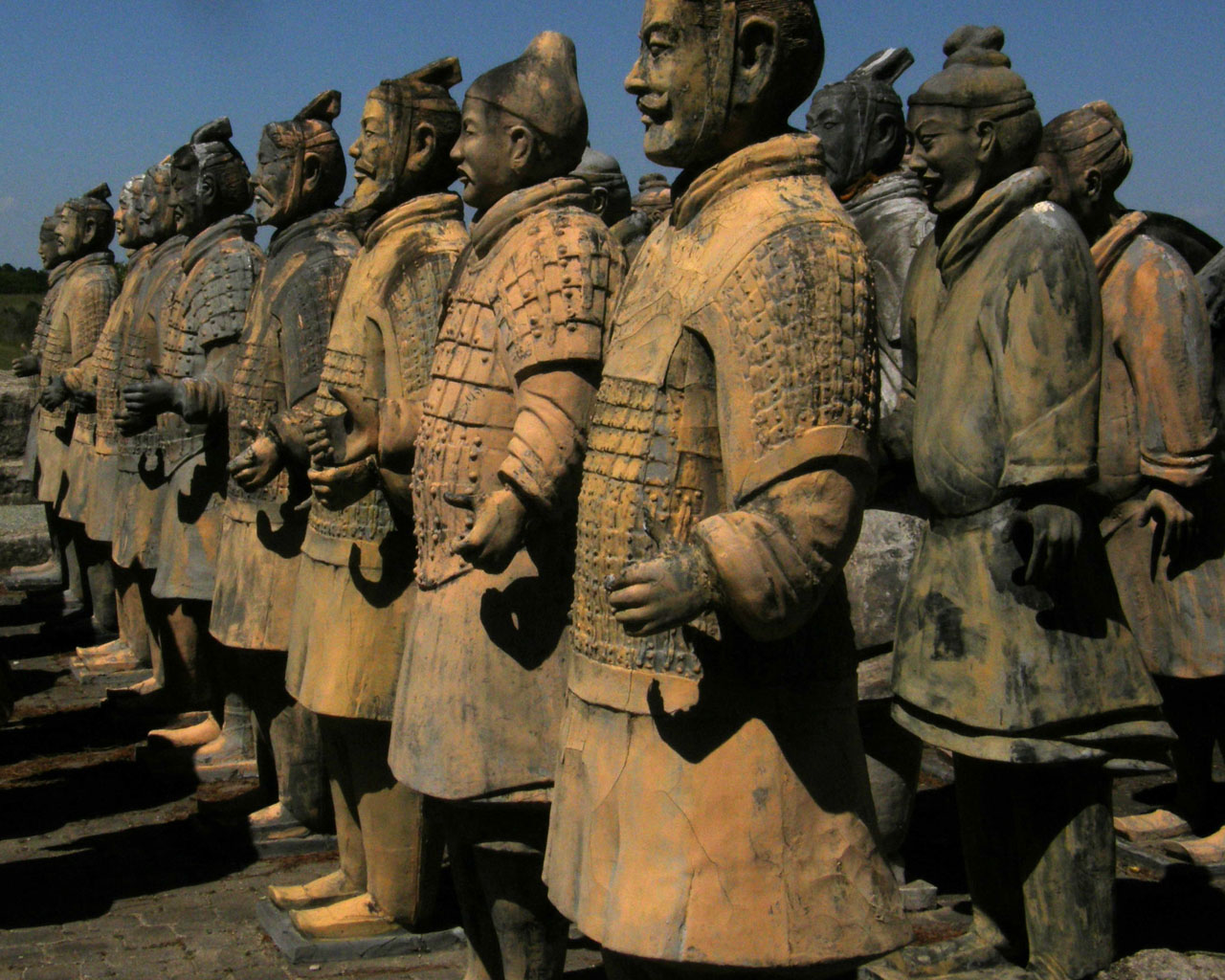
Full-scale statues at Forbidden Gardens in Katy, Texas.

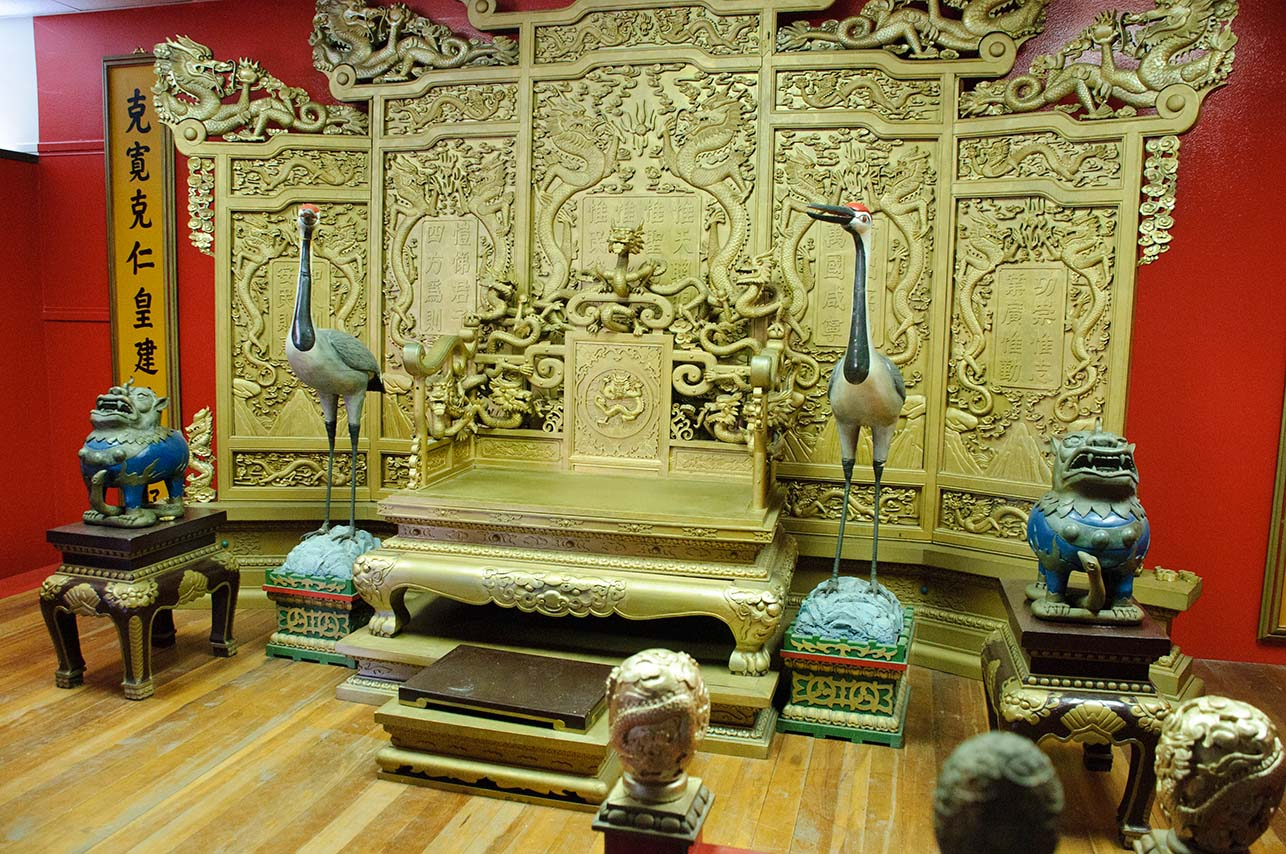
Replica of the Emperor Qin's throne on display at Forbidden Gardens

Forbidden Gardens (simplified Chinese: 紫禁花园; traditional Chinese: 紫禁花園 ) was an outdoor museum of Chinese culture and history located on Texas Highway 99 and Franz Road in northern Katy, Greater Houston, Texas, United States. The museum was funded and opened by businessman Ira Poon in 1996. Forbidden Gardens closed its doors in 2011.

== Features and naming ==
Forbidden Gardens took its name from two of its major features: A 1:20 scale model of the Forbidden City with hundreds of palace buildings and figurines under a 40,000-square-foot (3,700 m^{2}) pavilion, and the small grounds for walking and viewing additional exhibits.

Additional exhibits included a detailed panorama of a scholarly retreat called Lodge of the Calming of the Heart, an outdoor array of 6,000 one-third scale soldiers and chariots from the Terracotta Army tomb of the first Emperor of Qin, an indoor panorama of a city called the Venice of China (Suzhou), and rooms exhibiting details of historical architecture and weapons.

Forbidden Gardens was unusual in that it was privately funded. It displayed extensive models made and shipped from China. It originally cost $40 million to construct and only 40 of the 80 acres (320,000 m^{2}) Poon bought were used. The Terracotta Army display was unique in that the statues were exposed to direct sunlight, unlike the sheltered originals, enabling excellent photography conditions.

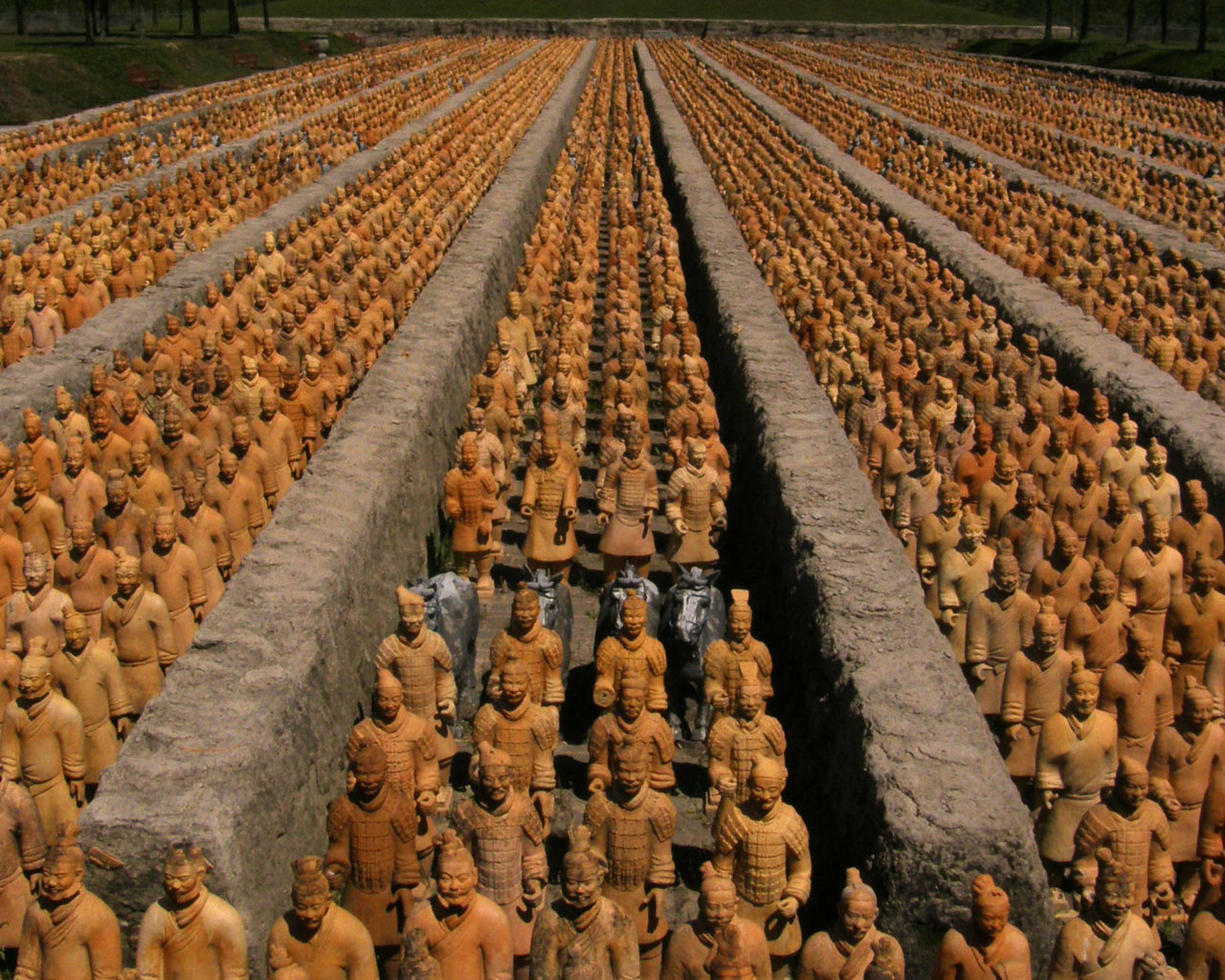
Terracotta Army reproduction in one-third scale.

== Closure ==
It was announced that the Forbidden Gardens would close its doors on February 21, 2011, to make way for the Grand Parkway expansion. Terracotta soldiers were offered on Craigslist for $100 a soldier, sparking media attention. The warriors were pulled off Craigslist on February 9, with a note explaining that excess demand made it necessary.
