= Daughters of the Republic of Texas =

American nonprofit organization

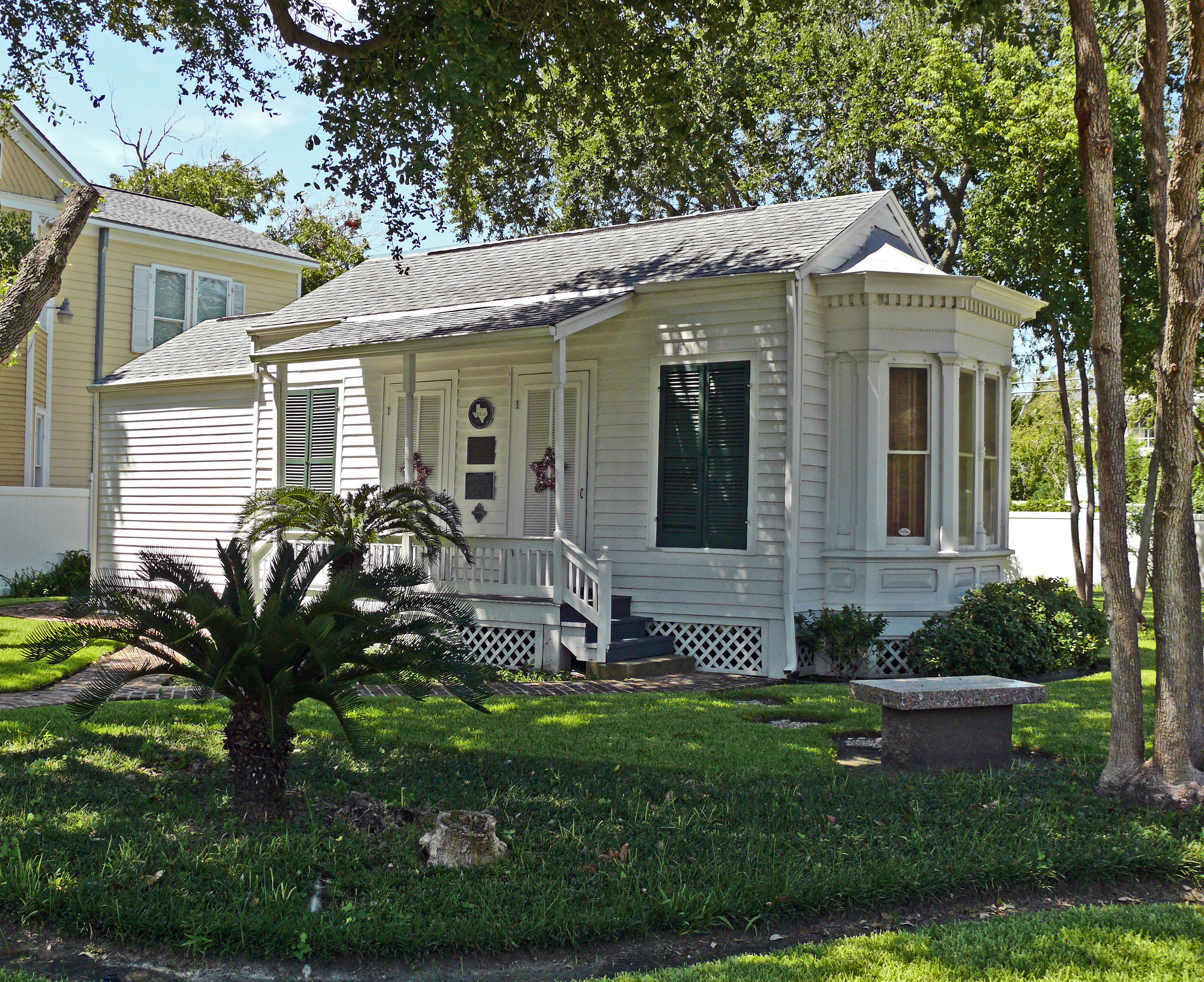
- The Cradle, birthplace of The Daughters of the Republic of Texas
- Abbreviation: DRT
- Formation: November 6, 1891; 135 years ago
- Founders: Betty Ballinger; Hally Ballinger Bryan Perry
- Founded at: The Cradle; 2902 Avenue O ½ Galveston, Texas, U.S.
- Headquarters: Austin, Texas, US
- Members: 7,000
- President General: Ora Jane Johnson
- Website: Daughters of the Republic of Texas

The Daughters of the Republic of Texas (DRT) is a lineal association dedicated to perpetuating the memory of the founding families and soldiers of the Republic of Texas. The Daughters of the Republic of Texas is best known for its former role as caretakers of The Alamo. In early 2015, Texas Land Commissioner George P. Bush officially removed control of the Alamo to the Texas General Land Office. The DRT were also the custodians of the historic French Legation Museum until 2017, which is owned by the State of Texas and is now operated by the Texas Historical Commission. In addition, they operate a museum in Austin on the history of Texas.

Membership is limited to descendants of ancestors who "rendered loyal service for Texas" prior to February 19, 1846, the date the Republic ceased to exist and Texas handed over authority to the United States.

== Beginnings ==
The Daughters of the Republic of Texas was formed in 1891 by cousins Betty Eve Ballinger and Hally Ballinger Bryan Perry at The Cure, the Ballinger family library in Galveston, Texas. The organization was originally called the Daughters of the Lone Star Republic before taking its present name.

The first president of the organization in 1891 was Mary Smith Jones, widow of the Republic's last president Anson Jones. The first chapter that was chartered in DRT was the Sidney Sherman Chapter. The chapter was chartered in Galveston on November 6, 1891.

Hally's father Guy Morrison Bryan had emigrated to Texas in 1831. In March 1836, Bryan became the courier for at least one of William Barret Travis's Alamo letters from Bell's Landing to Velasco. He was an army orderly under Alexander Somervell, and in the Brazoria volunteer company under John Coffee Hays. He served in both the Texas House of Representatives and Texas State Senate. Bryan was a veteran of the American Civil War. He was a charter member and president of the Texas Veterans Association and charter member of the Texas State Historical Association.

Betty's grandfather William Houston Jack had served in the Alabama state legislature and emigrated to Texas in 1830. He was one of the authors of the Turtle Bayou Resolutions. Jack participated in the capture of Goliad, later joined Sam Houston's army and was a veteran of the Battle of San Jacinto. He served in both the Texas House of Representatives and Texas State Senate.

== Saving the Alamo ==
A protest must be recorded here against the wanton mutilation of the sculpture of the Missions by thoughtless relic hunters. The shameful chipping of the beautiful carving has been going on for years.

— San Antonio de Bexar-A Guide and History William Corner, 1890

By the late 1880s the historic San Antonio missions were falling into disrepair and becoming subject to vandals. Two dedicated DRT women stepped forward to restore and preserve the Alamo for future generations.

The public entrance known as the Alamo's mission chapel was already owned by the State of Texas, which had purchased the building from the Catholic Church in 1883 and had given custody to the City of San Antonio. The city had made no improvements to the chapel structure, and ownership did not include the long barracks (convento).

In 1903, Adina Emilia De Zavala enlisted heiress and philanthropist Clara Driscoll to join the Daughters of the Republic of Texas and chair the De Zavala fund raising committee to negotiate the purchase of the long barracks (convento) that was owned by wholesale grocers Charles Hugo and Gustav Schmeltzer. The asking price was $75,000, most of which was donated by Clara Driscoll.

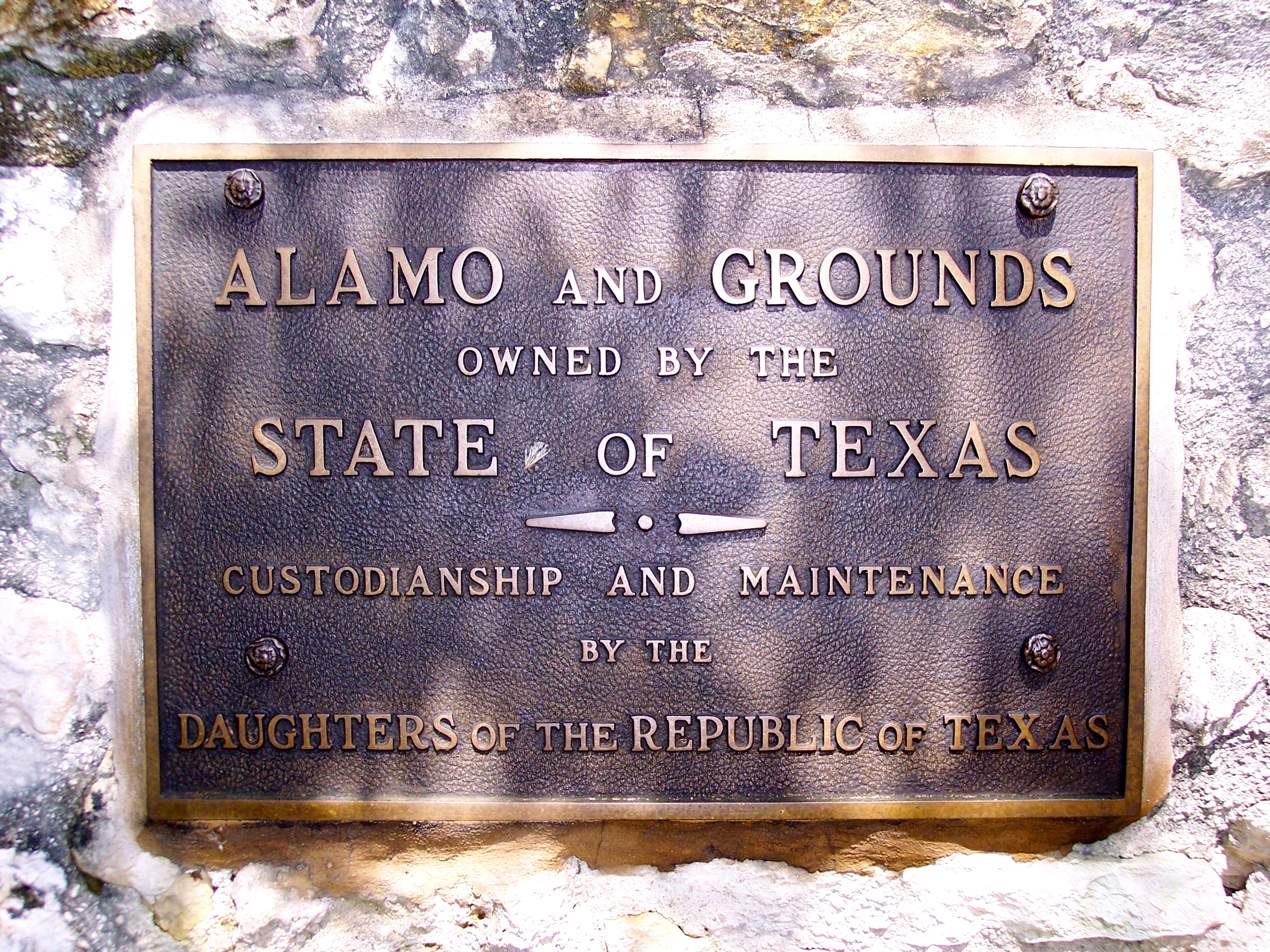
Daughters of the Republic of Texas plaque at the Alamo

In early 1905, Samuel Ealy Johnson, Jr. drafted the Alamo Purchase Bill which included a provision that The Alamo be overseen by Daughters of the Republic of Texas. On January 26, 1905, the Texas State Legislature approved, and Governor S. W. T. Lanham signed, the Alamo Purchase Bill for state funding to preserve the Alamo property. The state reimbursed Clara Driscoll and, on October 4, 1905, the governor formally conveyed the Alamo property, including the convento and the mission church, to the Daughters of the Republic of Texas.

A divide between two factions erupted over how the long barracks property was to be used. Driscoll and others believed it was not part of the original structure and should be turned into a park. Clara offered to raze the building at her own expense. De Zavala was adamant that the long barracks was part of the original building and where the major part of the battle had occurred. In 1908 De Zavala had a stand-off with authorities inside the structure. By 1911, Governor Oscar Branch Colquitt ordered the long barracks be restored to its original condition as it was in mission days. During the 1912 restoration, workers discovered foundation work that verified De Zavala's instincts that the structure had indeed been an original part of the Alamo.

In 1931, Clara donated another $70,000 to help the state legislature purchase more city property surrounding the shrine. In 1933, she defeated an effort by city engineers who wanted to purchase a portion of the Alamo property to widen Houston Street. In 1935, the persuasive Driscoll convinced the San Antonio Fire Department to reconsider building a new fire station adjacent to the Alamo. As president of the DRT in 1936, she oversaw Centennial celebrations of the shrine.

When Clara died in 1945, her body lay in repose in the Alamo chapel. Adina died in 1955 and her casket draped with the flag of Texas was carried past the Alamo one last time.

== Later years ==
The DRT opposed filming of the 1969 Peter Ustinov comedy Viva Max!, asking the San Antonio city council to not permit the filming.

Entrance to the Daughters of the Republic of Texas Museum in Austin, Texas, featuring a cutout of Rosa von Roeder Kleberg

In 2009, a division arose between current, and former members of the DRT's board of management and the Alamo Committee over the current administration's management, preservation and financial vision for the Alamo. The disagreement eventually led to the expulsions of three DRT members beginning in October 2010. Early in 2011, Texas State Senator Leticia R. Van de Putte, whose district includes The Alamo historic site, drafted legislation for increased oversight and reporting of the DRT at the Alamo. Through a lengthy investigation by Texas Attorney General Greg Abbott, an attempt blocked by Governor Rick Perry to trademark the words "The Alamo", a contract dispute to market the Alamo with William Morris Endeavor, and a failed 175th Anniversary symphony concert celebration with musician Phil Collins, the DRT maintained control of the Alamo through 2010, and most of 2011. However, Van De Putte's legislation which gained momentum throughout the 2011 Texas Legislative session, ended up as HB3726. In an extended session, House Bill 3726 was passed and signed by Texas Governor Rick Perry before leaving to begin his campaign for the 2012 Presidential election, effectively ending the DRT's 106-year reign as the sole caretakers of the Alamo. The new law placed the Alamo under the care and leadership of the Texas General Land Office (GLO). The DRT entered into an 18-month operating agreement with the GLO as a State contractor at the Alamo. The DRT's contract with the State expired June 2013.

== Membership ==
Membership in DRT is open to women only, who must meet the following criteria:

- at least sixteen years of age,
- must be personally acceptable to the association
- who can prove lineal descent from men and women who rendered loyal service to Texas prior to its annexation in 1846 by the United States. Acceptable loyal service can be obtained by one of the following four criteria:
  - colonization with Stephen Fuller Austin's "Old Three Hundred" or by the authority of the Spanish, Mexican, or Texas Republican governments,
  - military service to the Spanish, Mexican, or Texas Republican governments during the appropriate era
  - loyal citizenship of the Republic of Texas prior to annexation
  - receipt of land grants authorized by the Provisional Government of the Republic of Texas.

== Notable members ==
Clara Driscoll

- Betty Ballinger (1819–1907), clubwoman and suffragist
- Clara Driscoll (1881–1945), philanthropist
- Birdie Robertson Johnson (1868–1926), suffragist, clubwoman, and president of the Texas Federation of Women's Clubs
- Mary Smith Jones (1819–1907), First Lady of the Republic of Texas
- Hally Ballinger Bryan Perry (1868–1955), civic leader
- Cornelia Branch Stone (1840–1925), President General of the United Daughters of the Confederacy
- Leticia Van de Putte (born 1954), politician
- Lynn Forney Young, President General of the Daughters of the American Revolution
- Adina Emilia De Zavala (1861–1955), teacher and historian

== See also ==
- Sons of the Republic of Texas
