= William Pitt Ballinger =

American politician and lawyer (1825–1888)

Personal details
- Born: September 25, 1825 Barbourville, Kentucky, US
- Died: January 20, 1888 (aged 62) Galveston, Texas, US
- Party: Whig
- Children: 5, including Betty
- Profession: Politician, lawyer

William Pitt Ballinger (September 25, 1825 – January 20, 1888) was an American politician and lawyer. He had a significant impact on the development of Texas realty and railroad law. He originally supported the Confederacy during the Civil War. Following the war, he was instrumental in the reconstruction in Texas, the emancipation of black slaves, and the industrial development of the South.

== Early life ==
Ballinger was born in Barbourville, Kentucky, on September 25, 1825. He was the eldest child of James Franklin Ballinger and Olivia Adams, who named him for William Pitt. His mother died after giving birth to two daughters and another son, all of whom were raised by James.

Ballinger's early education was informal. It included homeschooling by his father, attending presentations at the county courthouse, and reading books from his father's classical library. In 1840, Ballinger was invited to attend a recently opened Jesuit school in Bardstown, Kentucky, St. Mary's Catholic College.

== Career ==
=== Law ===
Ballinger left his native state for Galveston, Texas, in 1843 in an attempt to improve his health. After his arrival, he studied law under James Love.

=== Politics ===
Like the governor of Texas, Sam Houston, Ballinger was pro-Union and opposed secession, but the Unionists were outvoted in a statewide referendum by a margin of 46,129 to 14,697. Yet, he was also an adversary to the Republican Party and offered his full support to the Confederacy after secession.

== Personal life ==
Ballinger married Hallie P. Jack in 1850. They had two sons and three daughters, including Betty Ballinger.

== Death and legacy ==
Ballinger died in Galveston on January 20, 1888.

The town of Ballinger, Texas was named after him.

== See also ==
- José María Jesús Carbajal
