= Laredo, Texas =

Laredo
- City
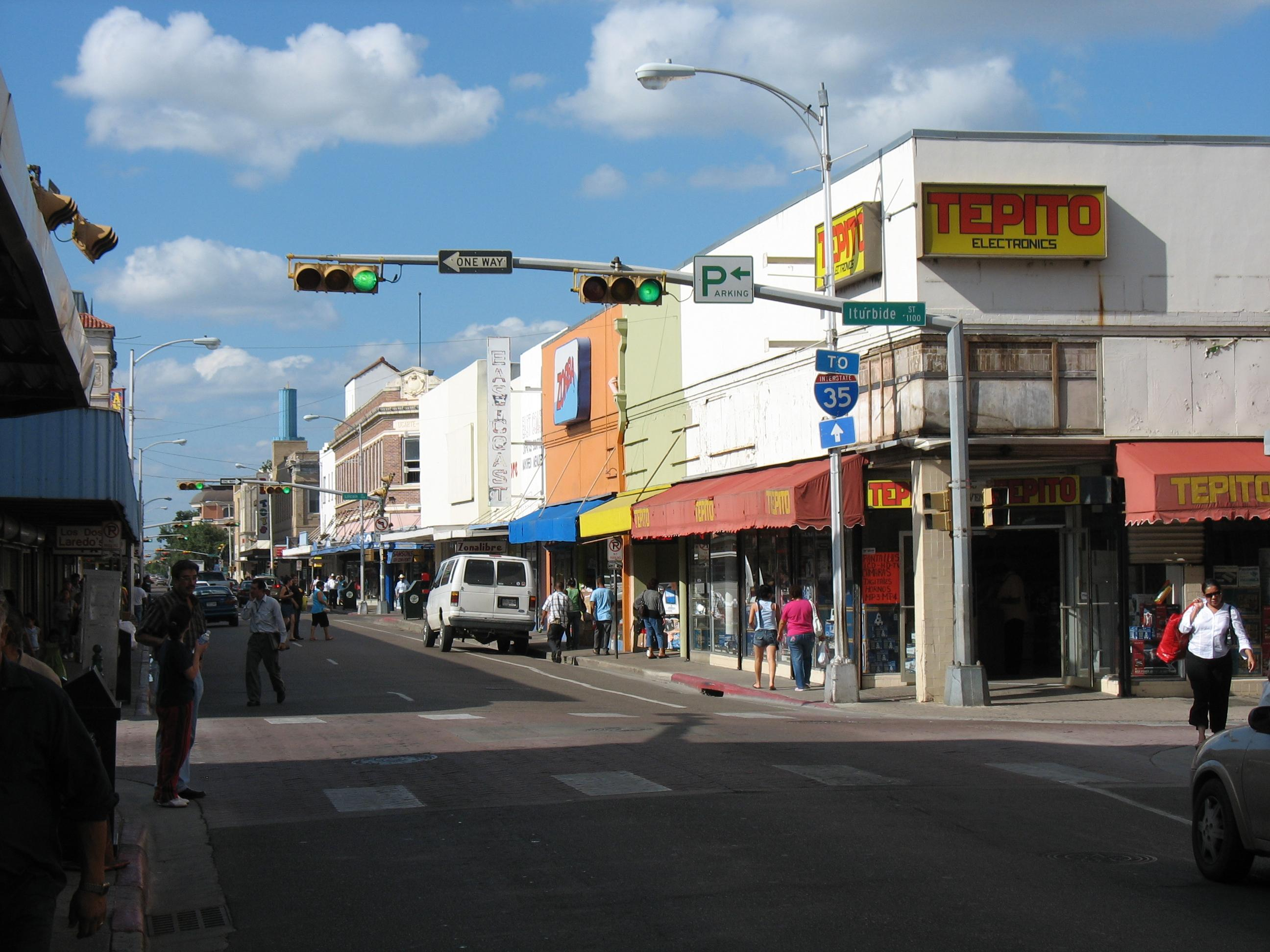
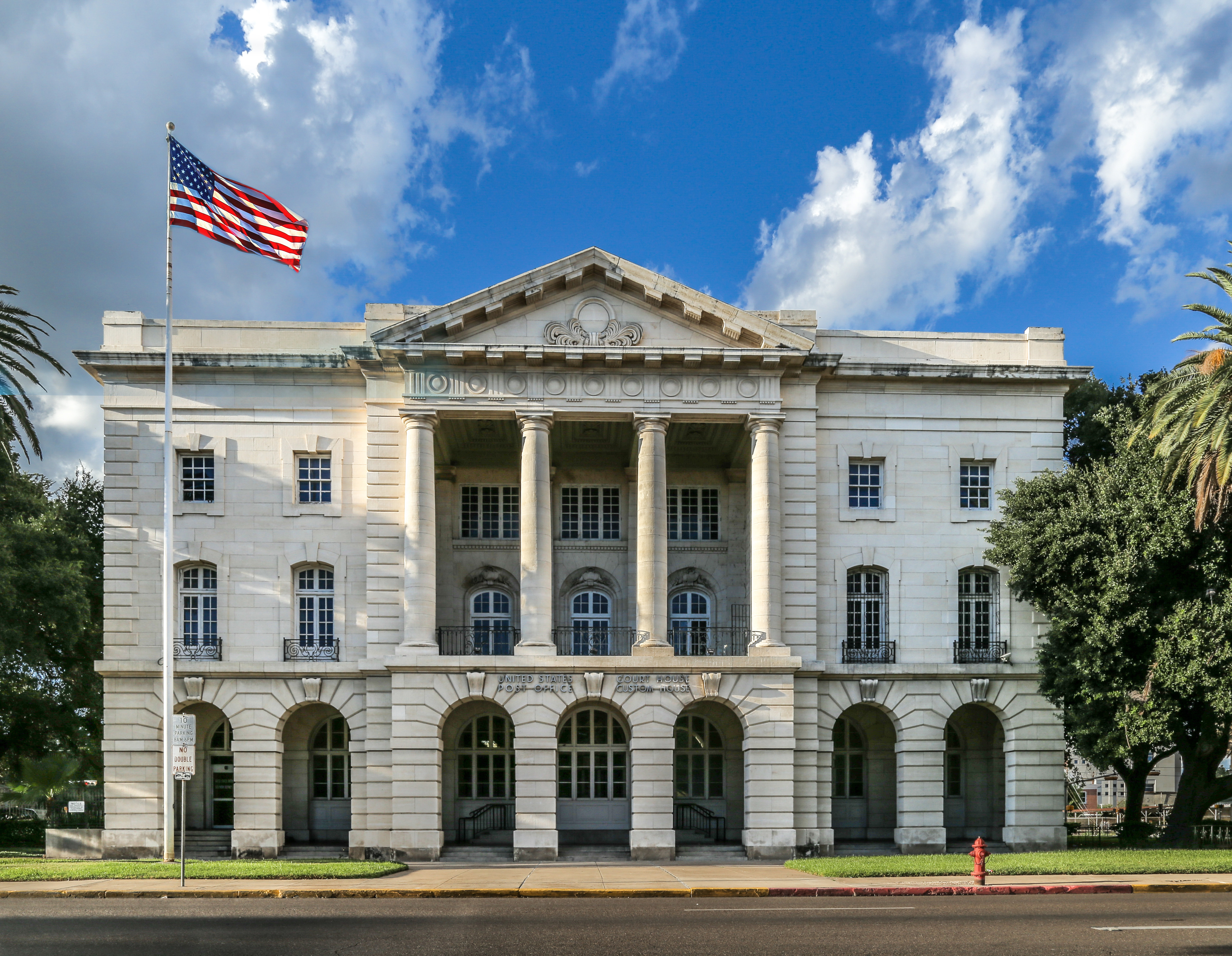
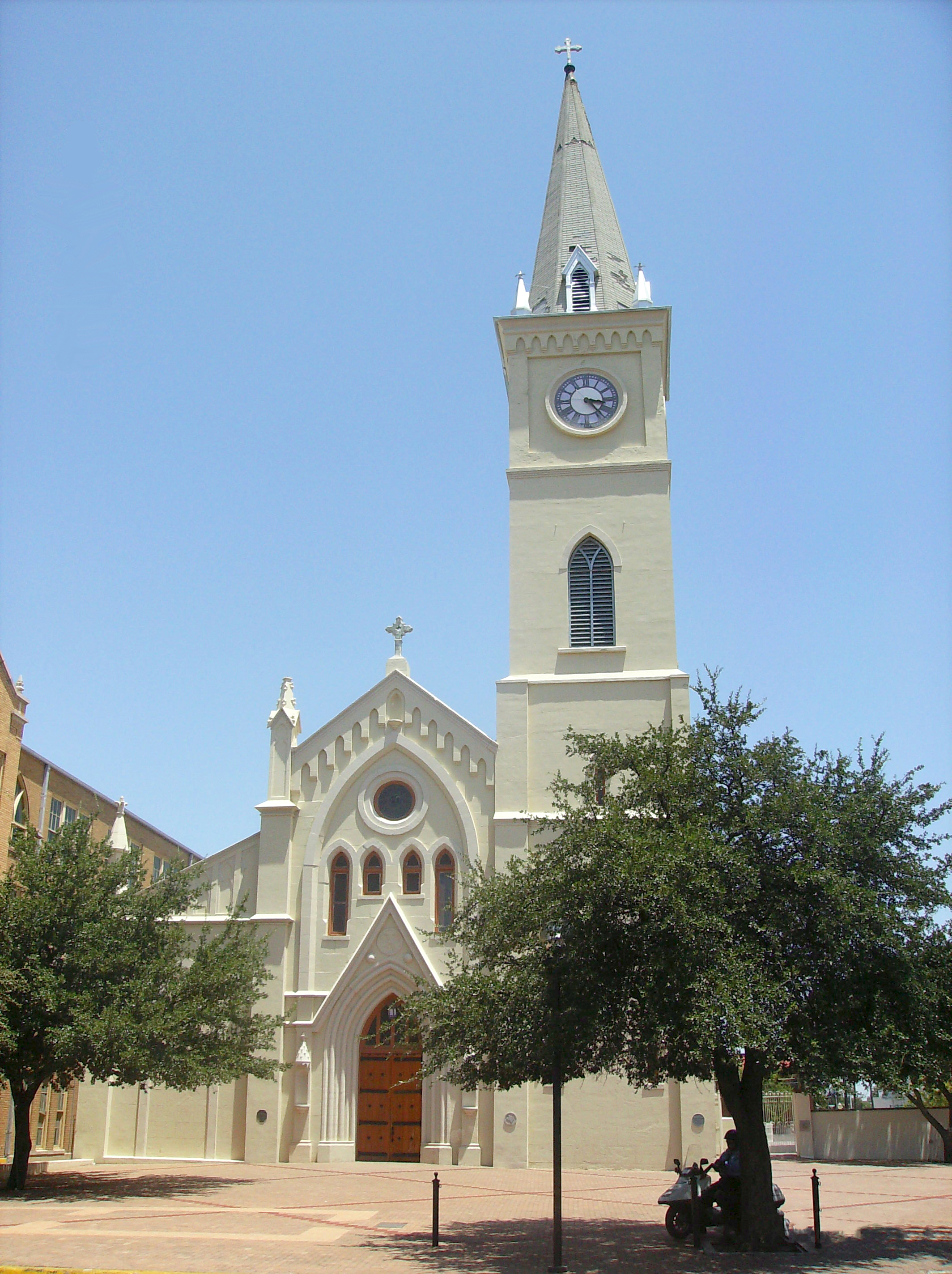
- Downtown Laredo Laredo U.S. Post Office San Agustin Cathedral San Agustin Plaza

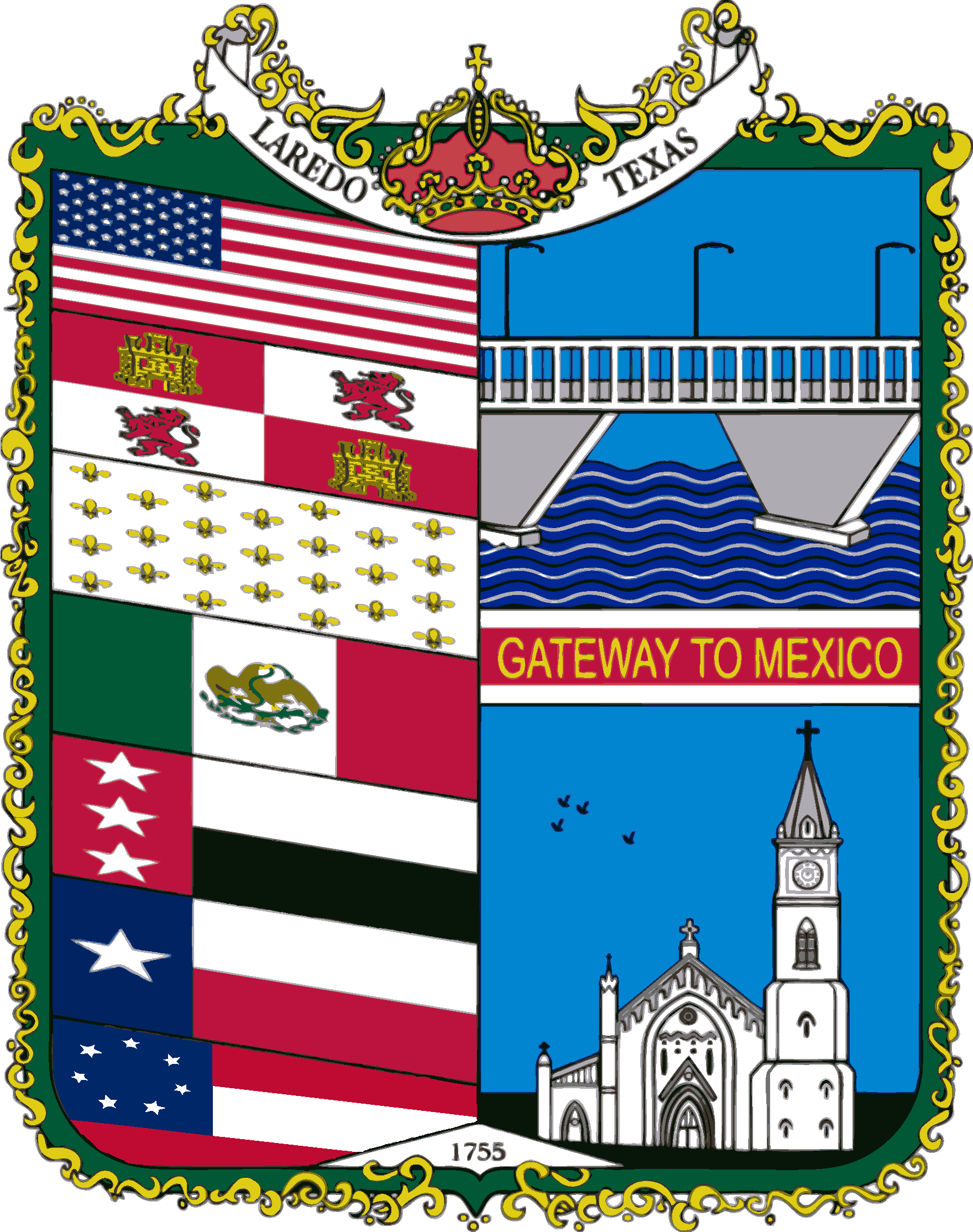
- Flag Seal Coat of arms
- Nicknames: The Gateway City, Gateway to Mexico, The City Under Seven Flags, The City of Saints and Generals
- Interactive map of Laredo
- Location within Texas Location within the United States
- Coordinates: 27°31′25″N 99°29′25″W
- Country: United States
- State: Texas
- County: Webb
- Metropolitan area: Laredo–Nuevo Laredo Metropolitan Area
- Founded: August 25, 1755
- Settled as: Villa de San Agustín de Laredo
- Founder: Tomás Sánchez
- Named for: Laredo, Spain

Government
  - Type: Council–manager
  - Mayor: Victor D. Treviño
  - City manager: Robert A. Eads

Area
  - City: 107.96 sq mi (279.61 km^{2})
  - Land: 106.49 sq mi (275.81 km^{2})
  - Water: 1.47 sq mi (3.80 km^{2})
  - Metro: 161.76 sq mi (418.96 km^{2})
- Elevation: 450 ft (137.2 m)

Population (2020)
  - City: 255,205
  - Estimate (2025): 269,515 ▲
  - Rank: US: 85th
  - Density: 2,396.5/sq mi (925.3/km^{2})
  - Urban: 251,462 (US: 163rd)
  - Urban density: 3,916.6/sq mi (1,512.2/km^{2})
  - Metro: 267,114 (US: 186th)
  - Metro density: 1,651.3/sq mi (637.56/km^{2})
- Demonyms: Laredoan; Laredense

GDP
  - Metro: $17.010 billion (2022)
- Time zone: UTC−6 (CST)
  - Summer (DST): UTC−5 (CST)
- ZIP Codes: 78040–78046, 78049
- Area code: 956
- FIPS code: 48-41464
- GNIS feature ID: 1339633
- Website: cityoflaredo.com

Laredo (English pronunciation: /ləˈɹeɪdoʊ/; Spanish pronunciation: [laˈɾeðo]) is a city in the U.S. state of Texas and the county seat and largest city of Webb County, on the north bank of the Rio Grande in South Texas, across from Nuevo Laredo, Tamaulipas, Mexico. Founded in 1755, Laredo grew from a village to the capital of the short-lived Republic of the Rio Grande to the largest inland port on the Mexican border. Laredo's economy is primarily based on international trade with Mexico, and as a major hub for three areas of transportation: land, rail, and air cargo. The city is on the southern end of I-35, which connects manufacturers in northern Mexico through Interstate 35 as a major route for trade throughout the U.S. It has four international bridges and two railway bridges.

According to the 2020 census, the city's population was 255,205, making it the 11th-most populous city in Texas and third-most populated U.S. city on the Mexican border, after San Diego, California, and El Paso, Texas. Its metropolitan area is the 178th-largest in the U.S. and includes all of Webb County, with a population of 267,114. Laredo is also part of the cross-border Laredo-Nuevo Laredo metropolitan area with an estimated population of 636,516.

Laredo's Hispanic proportion of 95.15% is one of the highest proportion of Hispanic Americans of any city in the United States outside of Puerto Rico.

Texas A&M International University and Laredo College are in Laredo. Laredo International Airport is within the Laredo city limits, while the Quetzalcoatl International Airport is nearby in Nuevo Laredo on the Mexican side.

The biggest festival, Washington's Birthday Celebration, is held during the later part of January and the majority of February, attracting hundreds of thousands of tourists.

== History ==
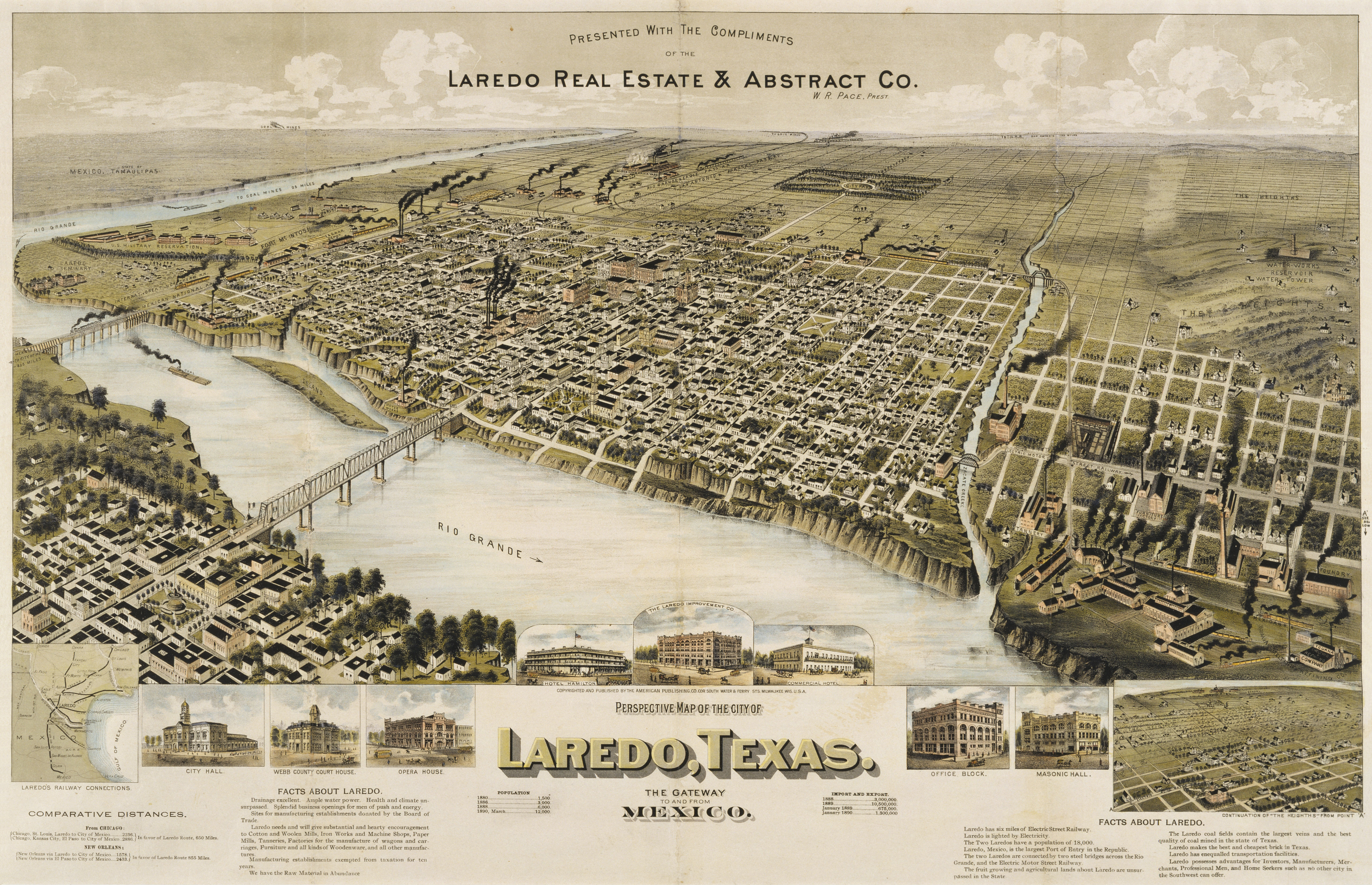
Map of Laredo in 1892

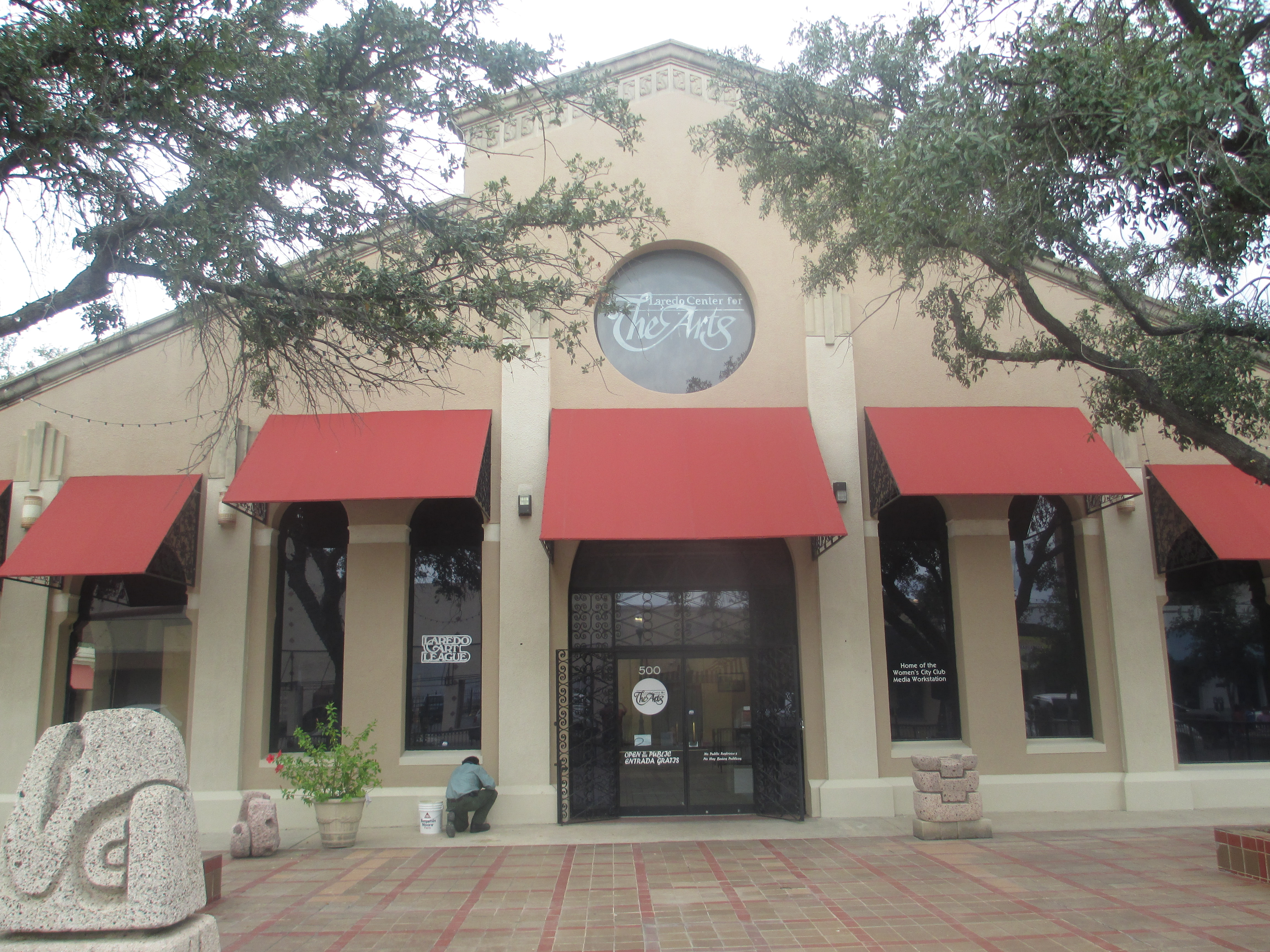
Laredo Center for the Arts in the downtown square

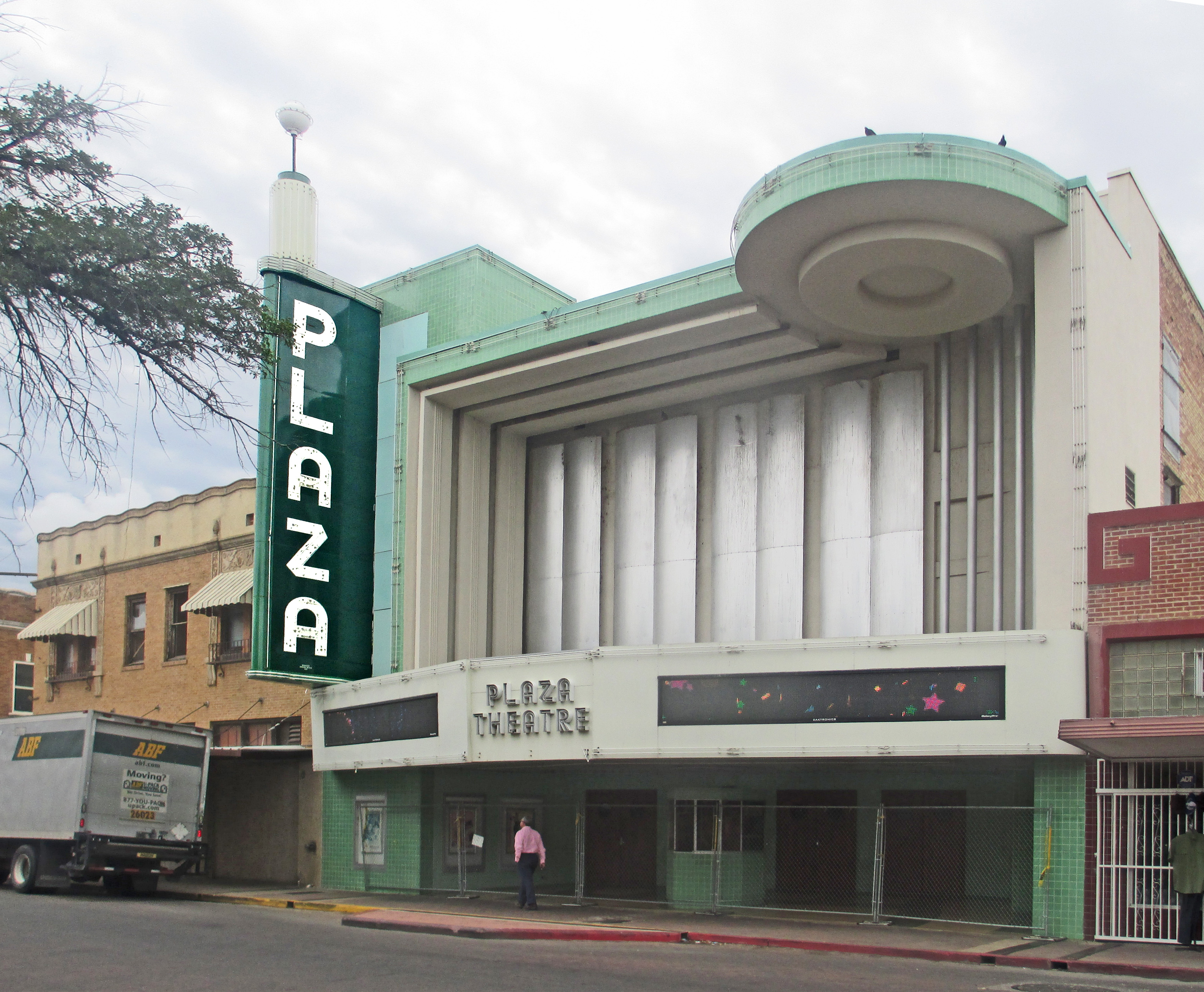
Though the facility has been closed since 1999, the marquee of the Plaza Theater in downtown Laredo has been renovated. A citizens committee sought without success to establish a private–public partnership to reopen the Plaza as a live-entertainment venue. In 2018, the city council sought private entities, nonprofit organizations, and an architect to make the facility useful again.

The Spanish colonial settlement of Villa de San Agustín de Laredo was founded in 1755 by Don Tomás Sánchez de la Barrera, while the area was part of the Nuevo Santander region in the Spanish viceroyalty of New Spain. Villa de San Agustín de Laredo was named after Laredo, Cantabria, Spain and in honor of Saint Augustine of Hippo. In 1840, Laredo was the capital of the independent Republic of the Rio Grande, set up in opposition to Antonio López de Santa Anna; it was brought back into Mexico by military force.

In 1846 during the Mexican–American War, the town was occupied by the Texas Rangers. After the war, the Treaty of Guadalupe-Hidalgo ceded the land to the United States. A referendum was taken in the town, which voted to petition the American military government in charge of the area to return the town to Mexico. When this petition was rejected, many who had been in the area for generations, moved across the river into Mexican territory, where they founded Nuevo Laredo. Many others, especially original land grantees on the north side of the Rio Grande remained, becoming Texans in the process. In 1849, the United States Army set up Fort McIntosh (originally Camp Crawford). Laredo was rechartered as a city in 1852.

Laredo is one of the oldest crossing points along the Mexico–United States border, and the nation's largest inland port of entry. In 2005, Laredo celebrated the 250th anniversary of its founding.

The etymology of the name for the Spanish town of Laredo is unclear. Some scholars say the name stems from glaretum, which means "sandy, rocky place". Others state Laredo stems from a Basque word meaning "beautiful pastures". Laredo might also stem from the Latin larida, which means gull.

Cellist Yo-Yo Ma brought his Bach Project to the Juarez–Lincoln International Bridge in April 2019.

== Geography ==
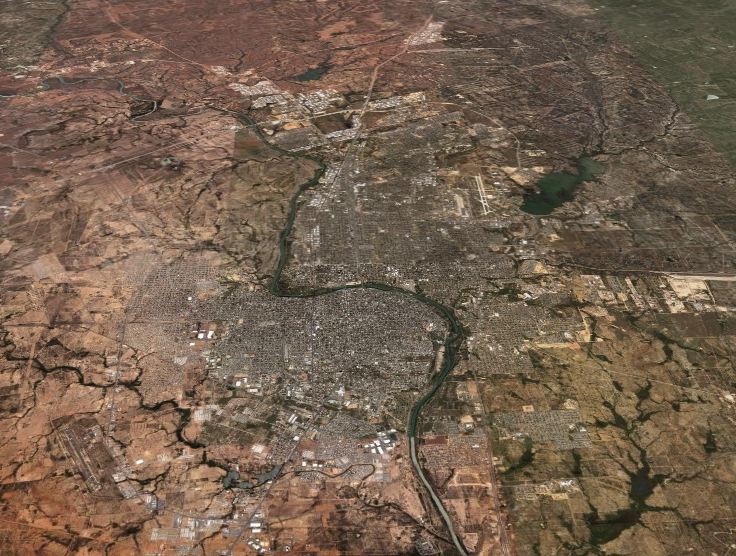
NASA satellite image of Laredo and Nuevo Laredo (2007)

According to the United States Census Bureau, the city has a total area of 102.6 square miles (265.7 km^{2}), of which 1.5 square miles (3.9 km^{2}) (1.37%) are covered by water.

=== Location ===
Laredo is on the west end of the Rio Grande Plains, south of the Edwards Plateau, west of the Coastal Plains, and east of the Mexican Mountains. The area consists of a few hills and flat land covered with grasses, oaks, and mesquite.

=== Bodies of water ===
Notable geographic features are the Rio Grande and Chacon Creek's man-made reservoir, Lake Casa Blanca, in Lake Casa Blanca International State Park. The lake is 371 acres (1.5 km^{2}) of land and 1,650 acres (7 km^{2}) of water. The six major creeks are Chacon Creek, San Ildefonso Creek, San Ygnacio Creek, Santa Isabel Creek, Sombrerillito Creek, and Zacate Creek, all of which drain into the Rio Grande. Several man-made reservoirs include the San Ildefonso Creek Lake (second-largest reservoir), and the Sombrerillito Creek Lake (third-largest reservoir).

=== Climate ===
Laredo is considered to have a hot semi-arid climate (Köppen, BSh). with sweltering temperatures in the summer and mild temperatures during the winter. Its weather is affected by the Sierra Madre Oriental mountains to the west, the Gulf of Mexico to the east, and the Chihuahuan Desert of Northern Mexico and West Texas. Moisture from the Pacific is cut off by the Mexican mountain range.

The normal monthly mean temperature ranges from 57.6 °F (14.2 °C) in January to 89.1 °F (31.7 °C) in August; official record temperatures range from 11 °F (−11.7 °C) on December 30, 1983, up to 115 °F (46.1 °C) on May 7, 1927, June 17, 1908, and June 19, 2023. On average, temperatures reach 100 °F (37.8 °C) or higher on 74.2 afternoons annually, and fall to or below the freezing mark on 4.6 mornings, although, in five seasons, (Note: 1931–32, 1949–50, 2012–13, 2014–15 and 2015–16.) the annual minimum temperature was above freezing.

Rainfall averages 19.7 in (500 mm) annually, with higher amounts typically occurring from May to October, with peaks in May and September separated by a secondary minimum due to a westward shift of the subtropical anticyclone and divergence between the westerlies and trade winds. Actual annual rainfall has ranged from 6.65 inches or 168.9 millimetres in 2011 to 42.28 inches or 1,073.9 millimetres in 1971. The highest monthly rainfalls have been 12.94 inches or 328.7 millimetres in September 1923, 12.45 inches or 316.2 millimetres in July 1919, 12.29 inches or 312.2 millimetres in June 1973 and 11.54 inches or 293.1 millimetres in September 1971. The heaviest daily rainfall has been 7.55 inches or 191.8 millimetres on July 28, 1903. In contrast, not even a trace fell for 108 days from May 12 to August 28 of 1917.

Measurable snow in Laredo has occurred in only five seasons since records began in 1902:

1. on December 27–28, 1925 and January 22–23, 1926, totalling 3.7 inches (0.094 m)
2. on December 14, 1947, with 1.0 inch (0.025 m)
3. on January 9, 1967, with 2.7 inches (0.069 m)
4. on Christmas Eve 2004, with 1.1 inches (0.028 m)
5. on December 7–8, 2017, with 1.3 inches (0.033 m)

Climate data for Laredo, Texas (1991–2020 normals, (Note: Mean monthly maxima and minima (i.e. the expected highest and lowest temperature readings at any point during the year or given month) calculated based on data at said location from 1991 to 2020.) extremes 1902–present (Note: Records for Laredo observed at: Fort McIntosh, Texas from November 15, 1902–December 31, 1931; Laredo City Weather Bureau Office (precipitation only), January 1932–February 1944; Two differing locations, March 1944–December 2009; Laredo International Airport since January 2010))
Month	Jan	Feb	Mar	Apr	May	Jun	Jul	Aug	Sep	Oct	Nov	Dec	Year
Record high °F (°C)	98 (37)	103 (39)	105 (41)	111 (44)	115 (46)	115 (46)	113 (45)	111 (44)	110 (43)	107 (42)	101 (38)	95 (35)	115 (46)
Mean maximum °F (°C)	86.6 (30.3)	90.7 (32.6)	96.9 (36.1)	102.0 (38.9)	104.8 (40.4)	106.1 (41.2)	106.9 (41.6)	106.2 (41.2)	103.3 (39.6)	98.0 (36.7)	90.6 (32.6)	84.9 (29.4)	109.1 (42.8)
Mean daily maximum °F (°C)	68.4 (20.2)	73.9 (23.3)	80.8 (27.1)	88.4 (31.3)	94.1 (34.5)	99.0 (37.2)	100.3 (37.9)	100.8 (38.2)	94.1 (34.5)	87.1 (30.6)	76.5 (24.7)	68.9 (20.5)	86.0 (30.0)
Daily mean °F (°C)	57.6 (14.2)	61.9 (16.6)	69.6 (20.9)	76.6 (24.8)	82.8 (28.2)	87.6 (30.9)	88.7 (31.5)	89.1 (31.7)	83.7 (28.7)	74.8 (23.8)	66 (19)	58.5 (14.7)	74.7 (23.7)
Mean daily minimum °F (°C)	46.8 (8.2)	51.7 (10.9)	58.3 (14.6)	64.9 (18.3)	71.5 (21.9)	76.2 (24.6)	77.1 (25.1)	77.4 (25.2)	73.1 (22.8)	65.8 (18.8)	55.6 (13.1)	48.0 (8.9)	63.9 (17.7)
Mean minimum °F (°C)	30.2 (−1.0)	33.0 (0.6)	39.0 (3.9)	48.3 (9.1)	59.2 (15.1)	68.9 (20.5)	70.8 (21.6)	71.7 (22.1)	61.7 (16.5)	45.0 (7.2)	37.2 (2.9)	30.5 (−0.8)	28.0 (−2.2)
Record low °F (°C)	15 (−9)	16 (−9)	25 (−4)	32 (0)	37 (3)	56 (13)	62 (17)	60 (16)	45 (7)	28 (−2)	21 (−6)	11 (−12)	11 (−12)
Average rainfall inches (mm)	0.77 (20)	0.65 (17)	1.34 (34)	1.30 (33)	2.82 (72)	1.81 (46)	1.86 (47)	1.58 (40)	3.87 (98)	1.66 (42)	0.97 (25)	1.05 (27)	19.68 (501)
Average rainy days (≥ 0.01 in)	5.4	4.7	4.6	3.7	5.2	4.7	4.4	4.5	7.7	4.1	4.4	6.1	59.5
Source: NOAA

== Demographics ==
Historical population
Year	Pop.	±%
1757	85	—
1770	185	+117.6%
1790	708	+282.7%
1820	1,430	+102.0%
1830	2,052	+43.5%
1860	1,256	−38.8%
1870	2,046	+62.9%
1880	3,521	+72.1%
1890	11,319	+221.5%
1900	13,429	+18.6%
1910	14,855	+10.6%
1920	22,710	+52.9%
1930	32,618	+43.6%
1940	39,274	+20.4%
1950	51,910	+32.2%
1960	60,678	+16.9%
1970	69,678	+14.8%
1980	91,449	+31.2%
1990	122,899	+34.4%
2000	176,576	+43.7%
2010	236,091	+33.7%
2020	255,205	+8.1%
2025 (est.)	269,515	+5.6%
U.S. Decennial Census; Texas Almanac: 1850–2010; Source: U.S. Decennial Census

=== Racial and ethnic composition ===
Laredo city, Texas – Racial and ethnic composition Note: the US Census treats Hispanic/Latino as an ethnic category. This table excludes Latinos from the racial categories and assigns them to a separate category. Hispanics/Latinos may be of any race.
Race / Ethnicity (NH = Non-Hispanic)	Pop 2000	Pop 2010	Pop 2020	% 2000	% 2010	% 2020
White alone (NH)	8,891	8,086	9,181	5.04%	3.42%	3.60%
Black or African American alone (NH)	276	478	773	0.16%	0.20%	0.30%
Native American or Alaska Native alone (NH)	122	87	131	0.07%	0.04%	0.05%
Asian alone (NH)	773	1,313	1,290	0.44%	0.56%	0.51%
Pacific Islander alone (NH)	15	11	25	0.01%	0.00%	0.01%
Some Other Race alone (NH)	22	121	450	0.01%	0.05%	0.18%
Mixed race or Multiracial (NH)	261	245	537	0.15%	0.10%	0.21%
Hispanic or Latino (any race)	166,216	225,750	242,818	94.13%	95.62%	95.15%
Total	176,576	236,091	255,205	100.00%	100.00%	100.00%

=== 2020 census ===
As of the 2020 census, 255,205 people, 75,037 households, and 58,294 families resided in the city.

The median age was 30.6 years. 30.1% of residents were under the age of 18 and 10.3% of residents were 65 years of age or older. For every 100 females there were 94.6 males, and for every 100 females age 18 and over there were 91.1 males age 18 and over.

98.0% of residents lived in urban areas, while 2.0% lived in rural areas.

There were 75,037 households in Laredo, of which 48.6% had children under the age of 18 living in them. Of all households, 50.4% were married-couple households, 15.3% were households with a male householder and no spouse or partner present, and 28.8% were households with a female householder and no spouse or partner present. About 16.3% of all households were made up of individuals and 6.3% had someone living alone who was 65 years of age or older.

There were 80,734 housing units, of which 7.1% were vacant. The homeowner vacancy rate was 1.2% and the rental vacancy rate was 8.2%.

Racial composition as of the 2020 census
Race	Number	Percent
White	97,301	38.1%
Black or African American	1,118	0.4%
American Indian and Alaska Native	1,603	0.6%
Asian	1,389	0.5%
Native Hawaiian and Other Pacific Islander	51	0.0%
Some other race	50,126	19.6%
Two or more races	103,617	40.6%
Hispanic or Latino (of any race)	242,818	95.1%

=== 2010 census ===
According to the 2010 U.S. census, the racial composition of Laredo was:

- Non-Hispanic Whites: 3.86%
- Black or African American: 0.5%
- Native American: 0.4%
- Asian: 0.6%
- Native Hawaiian and Other Pacific Islander: 0.00%
- Two or more races: 1.5%
- other races 9.3%
- Hispanic or Latino (of any race) – 95.6% (Mexican 86.9%, Puerto Rican 0.4%, Cuban 0.1%, other Hispanic or Latino 8.3%)

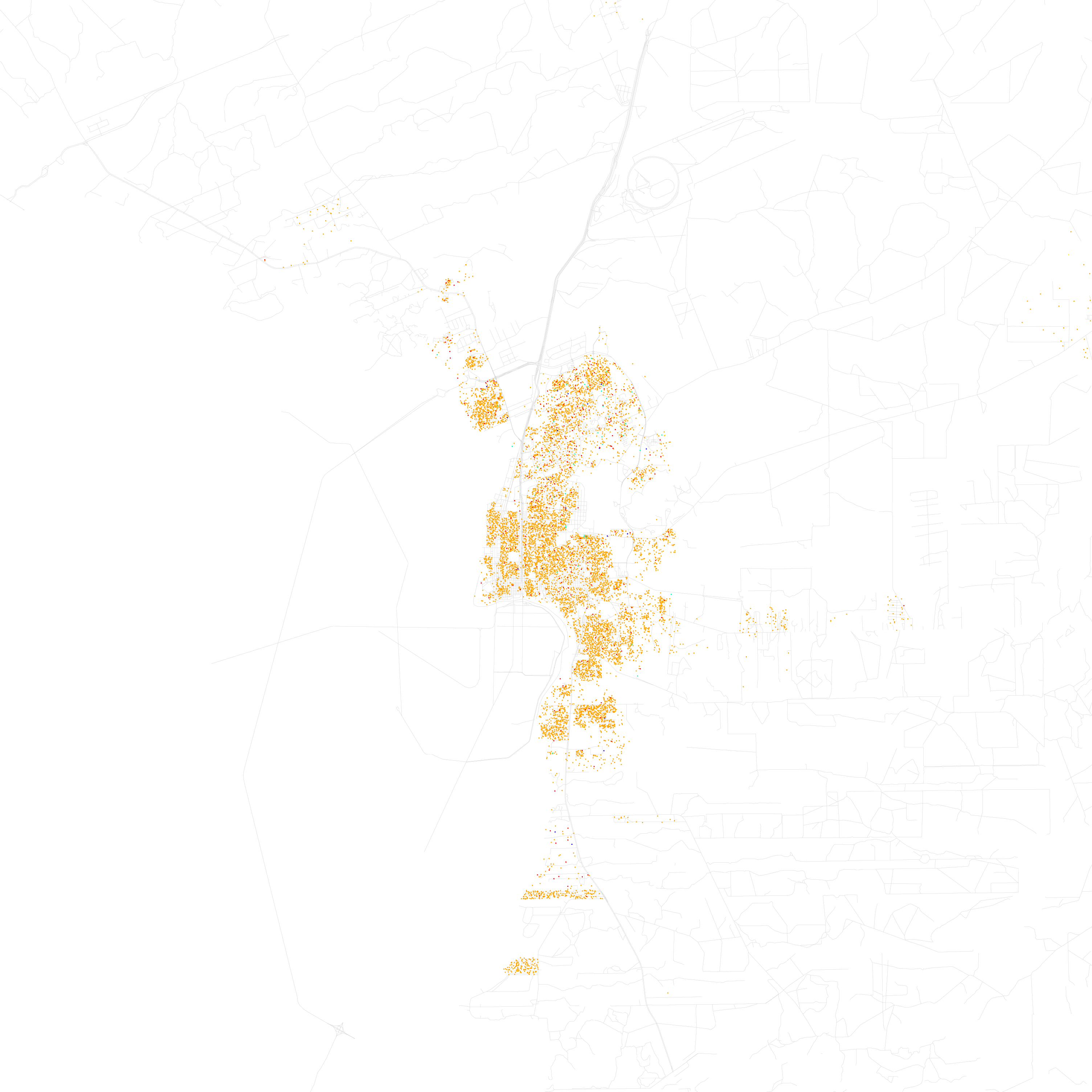
Map of racial distribution in Laredo, 2010 U.S. Census. Each dot is 25 people: ⬤ White ⬤ Black ⬤ Asian ⬤ Hispanic ⬤ Other

As of the 2010, Laredo is the 81st-largest city in the United States and the 10th-largest in Texas. According to the 2010 census there were 236,091 inhabitants in the city.

According to respondents' self-identification on the 2010 Census, the vast majority of Laredo's population is of Hispanic origin (95.6%), mostly Mexican (86.9%). Most Hispanics who did not identify themselves as Mexican identified as "other Hispanic or Latino" (8.3% of the total population). About 84.3% of the population identifies as white Hispanic, while only 11.3% identifies as Hispanic but not white; 4.4% of the population was not Hispanic or Latino (3.4% non-Hispanic White, 0.2% non-Hispanic Black or African American, 0.6% non-Hispanic Asian, 0.1% from some other race (non-Hispanic), and 0.1% of two or more races (non-Hispanic)).

The 2005 estimate listed 99,675 males and 108,112 females. The average household contained 3.69 occupants. The population density was 2,250.5 inhabitants per square mile (868.9/km^{2}).

Of the 60,816 households, 56,247 or 92.5% were occupied: 33,832 were owner-occupied units and 22,415 were renter-occupied units. About 62.0% were married couples living together, 18.7% had a female householder with no husband present, and 14.7% were not families. Around 12.7% of all households were made up of individuals, and 5.2% had someone living alone who was 65 or older. The average household size was 3.69, and the average family size was 4.18.

The city's population is distributed as 35.5% under the age of 18, 11.4% from 18 to 24, 29.5% from 25 to 44, 15.8% from 45 to 64, and 7.8% who were 65 years of age or older. The median age was 27 years. For every 100 females, there were 92.2 males. For every 100 females age 18 and over, there were 87.2 males.

The median income for a household in the city was $32,019, and for a family was $32,577. The per capita income for the city was $12,269; 29.2% of families were below the poverty line.

According to the United States Census Bureau, at a 2000 census, Laredo was the second-fastest growing city in the United States, after Las Vegas.

In 2016, the violent crime rate in Laredo dropped to 379 per 100,000 inhabitants, according to AreaVibes. The violent crime rate in Dallas was 694 per 100,000 inhabitants. In Houston, it was 967 per 100,000 inhabitants.

== Economy ==
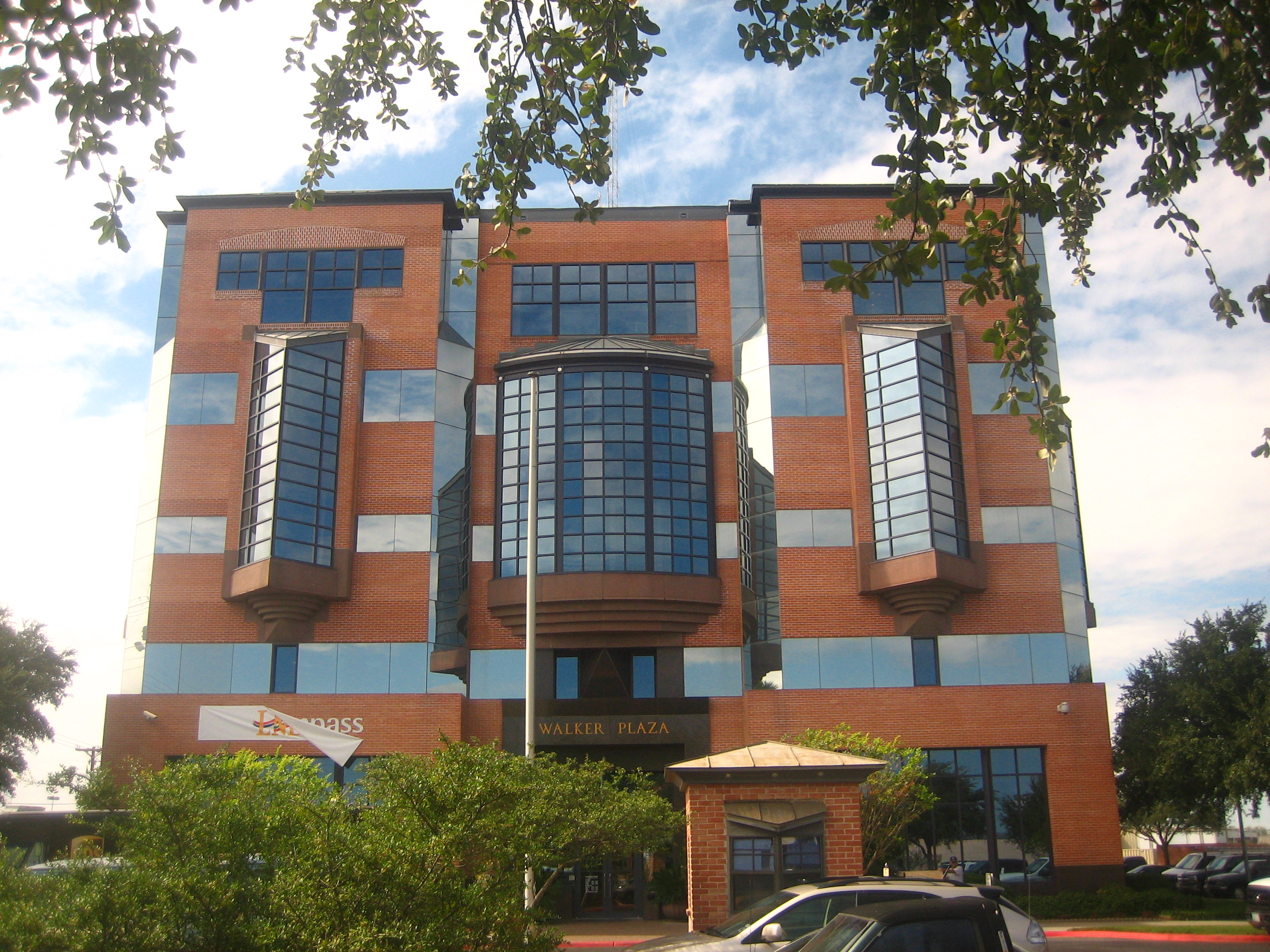
The Walker Plaza office complex in Laredo was built in the early 1990s by the family of South Texas rancher Gene S. Walker Sr.

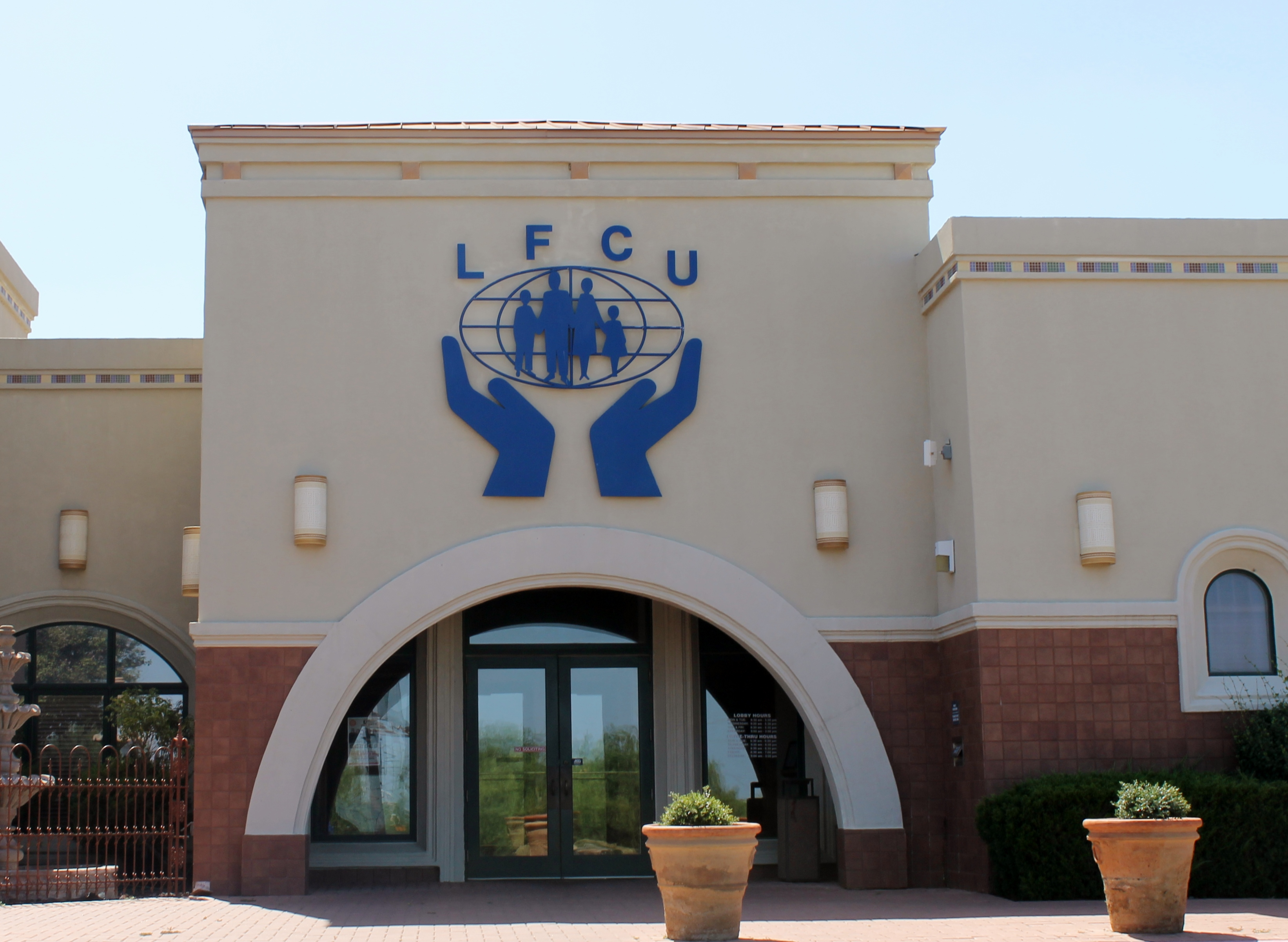
Laredo Federal Credit Union on McPherson Road

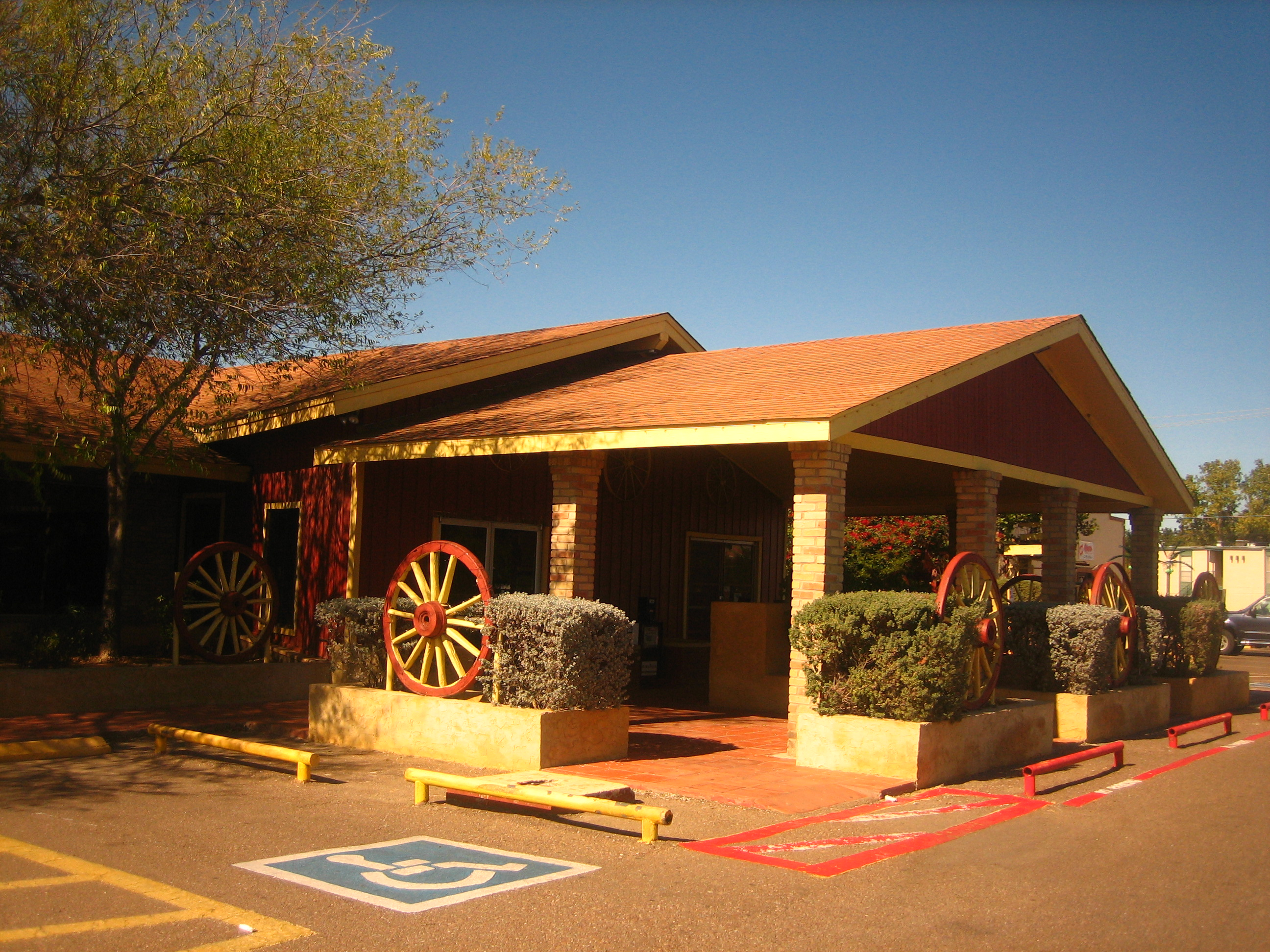
The former Cotulla Barbeque on McPherson Road at Taylor Street was closed, razed in 2012, and replaced by office buildings.

South Texas banking institutions in Laredo include Falcon International Bank, International Bank of Commerce, and Texas Community Bank.

Laredo is the largest inland port in the United States, and Nuevo Laredo the largest in Latin America. This is due to their respective locations, served by Interstate Highway 35 / Mexican Federal Highway 85, the effects of NAFTA, dozens of twin assembly plants on the Mexican side, and dozens of import export agencies to expedite trade. In January 2014, the Laredo customs district processed "$20 billion in two-way trade with Mexico", about half that for the entire US with Mexico for the month. Laredo is a shopping destination for Mexican shoppers from Northern Mexico. In 2015, the San Antonio Express-News reported the number of Mexican shoppers has declined due to drug war-related violence in Nuevo Laredo.

=== Trade ===
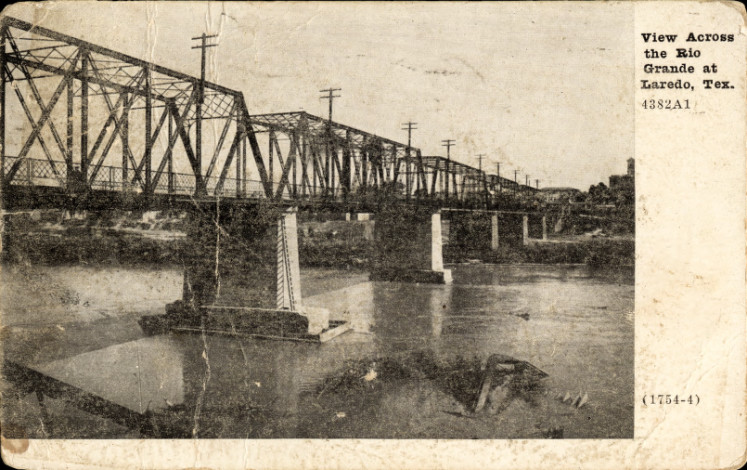
View across the Rio Grande at Laredo, Texas (postcard, c. 1909)

More than 47% of United States international trade headed for Mexico and more than 36% of Mexican international trade crosses through the Laredo port of entry. Laredo's economy revolves around commercial and industrial warehousing, import, and export. As a major player in international trade, the Laredo area benefited from passage of the North American Free Trade Agreement, which has encouraged trade. The Laredo port of entry consists of four international bridges (with a proposed fifth one) crossing the Rio Grande into the Mexican states of Tamaulipas and Nuevo León.

=== Retail sales ===
Retail sales attract shoppers from Northern Mexico and South Texas. There is one indoor shopping mall in Laredo, Mall del Norte, The Outlet Shoppes at Laredo, and another has not progressed past planning: Laredo Town Center, part of downtown redevelopment. There are dozens of shopping centers. The Streets of Laredo Urban Mall is an association created by businesses on Iturbide Street in the San Agustin historical district to beautify and renovate the area, which has a pedestrian scale.

- Mall Del Norte 1,198,199 sq ft (111,316.3 m^{2})
- The Outlet Shoppes at Laredo
- Streets of Laredo Urban Mall

=== Labor market information ===
As of October 2007, Laredo's labor market was in the following industries by percentage of number employed: Trade, Transportation, and Utilities (32%), Information (1%), Financial Activity (5%), Professional and Business Services (6%), Education and Health Services (15%), Leisure and Hospitality (10%), Government (23%), Mining and Construction (5%), Manufacturing (2%), and Other Services (2%).

Laredo has increased the number of nonagricultural jobs from 55,100 in January 1996 to 86,600 in October 2007. Laredo has had a higher job growth rate (2%–6.5%) than the state as a whole because of expanded international trade through NAFTA. In 2007, Laredo experienced a job growth rate of 2.5% with the unemployment rate as of October 2007, standing at 4.1% or 3,700 unemployed persons, as compared to 3.9% in Texas statewide. This is a significant drop since the mid-1990s, when Laredo's unemployment was over 15%.

Laredo has had positive job market growth since the mid-1990s; setbacks in the mining (oil/gas) industry shifted a few thousand workers to other industries such as international trade and construction. Many large employers in the oil and gas industries shut down operations in Laredo and across Texas, and shifted to foreign countries. The same effect occurred in the garment industry (Levis and Haggar) along the Texas border area. Laredo lost its only garment-producing company (Barry), costing the jobs of about 300 workers. Laredo's strong job growth rate in retail and transportation services limited the adverse effects of long-term unemployment from the few massive layoffs of the late 1990s. Laredo's success with international trade is also a vulnerability; it depends on changes to Mexico's economy, that status of immigration laws (along with daily border crossings: shoppers and commercial trade), and terrorism.

==== Top employers ====
Employer	Category	Employees
United Independent School District	Education	6,179
Laredo Independent School District	Education	4,500
City of Laredo	Government	2,371
Laredo Sector Border Patrol	Immigration	2,000
H-E-B	Grocery	1,626
Webb County	Government	1,500
Laredo Medical Center	Health care	1,300
Texas A&M International University	Education	1,215
McDonald's	Food	1,200
Walmart	Retail	937
Concentrix (formerly Convergys)	Call Center	860
Doctors Hospital	Health Care	811
International Bank of Commerce	Financial Services	661
Stripes Convenience Stores	Retail/Convenience	337
Laredo Energy Arena	Entertainment	293
Falcon International Bank	Financial Services	292

=== Agriculture ===
Laredo is a major center for the cattle ranching in the state. Cattle here suffer from the cattle fever tick, Rhipicephalus microplus (syn. Boophilus microplus). Researchers and ranchers are concerned about pyrethroid resistance developing and spreading here, as it has in nearby areas of the state and neighboring Tamaulipas state. Because the situation is so severe, the main office of the country's Cattle Fever Tick Eradication Program is located here. This program is operated by USDA APHIS. The Deutch Strain of this tick was collected here by Davey et al., 1980 and is now a commonly used laboratory strain negative for pyrethroid resistance.

== Arts and culture ==
=== Annual celebrations ===
The Washington's Birthday Celebration, a month-long event that celebrates George Washington's birthday, is the largest annual celebration of its kind in the United States, with 400,000 attendees. It was founded in 1898 by the Improved Order of Red Men, local chapter Yaqui Tribe No. 59. The first celebration was a success, and its popularity grew rapidly; in 1923, it received its state charter. In 1924, the celebration held its first colonial pageant, which featured 13 girls from Laredo, representing the 13 original colonies. The celebration includes parades, a carnival, an air show, fireworks, live concerts, and a citywide prom during which many of Laredo's elite dress in very formal attire. The related Jalapeño Festival is one of the United States' top 10 eating festivals.

Jamboozie is held in late January in downtown Laredo as part of the Washington's birthday celebrations. Similar to New Orleans' Mardi Gras, the Jamboozie is a colorful event, with many people dressed in beads, masks, and flamboyant outfits.

=== Museums ===
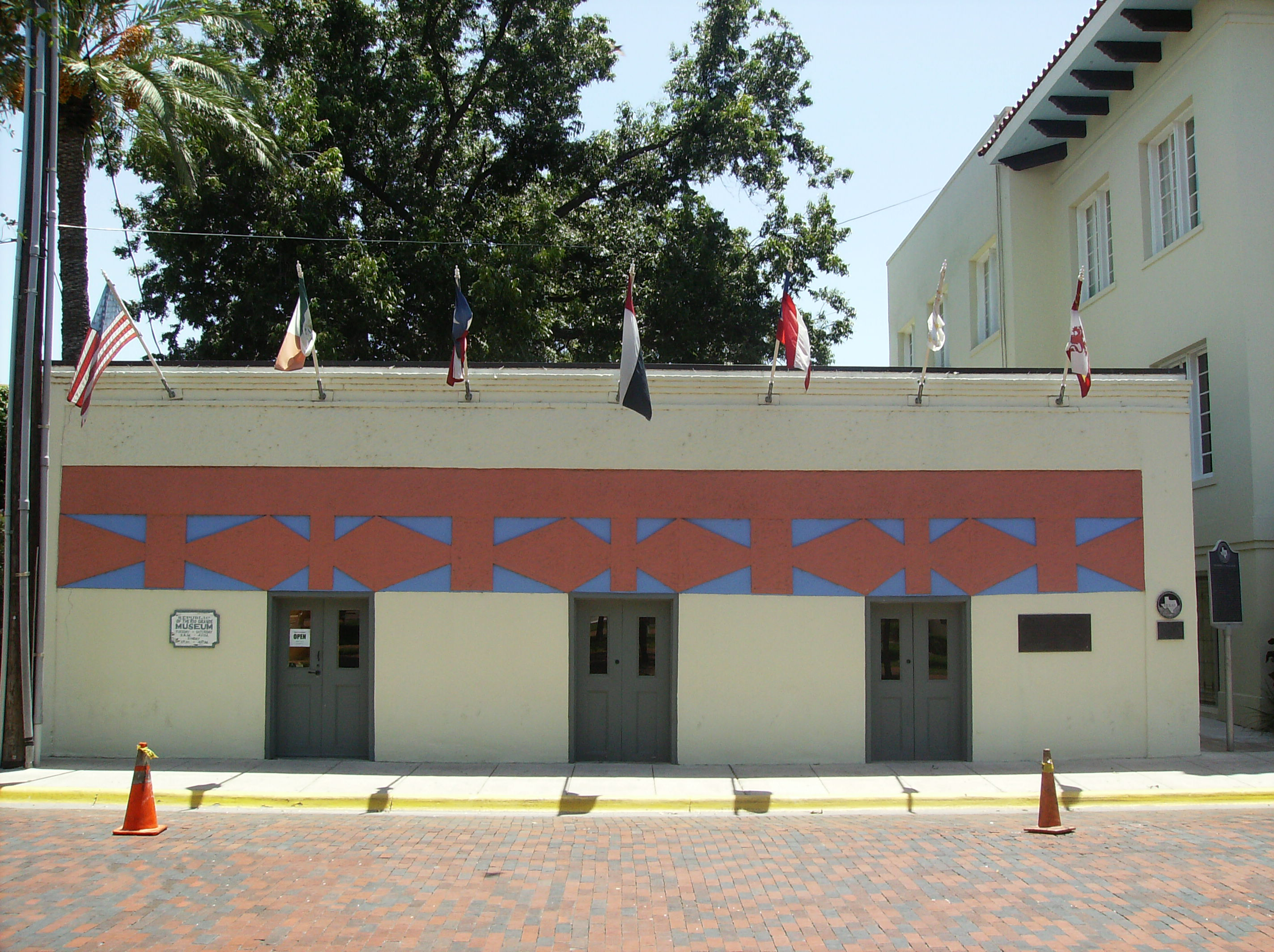
Republic of the Rio Grande Capitol Building Museum

The Republic of the Rio Grande Museum is in the downtown historical district next to the historic La Posada Hotel. What was once the capitol building now showcases memorabilia from the short lived Republic of the Rio Grande. It displays pictures, books, and furniture from the 19th century Laredo area, and offers guided tours for school-aged children and adults year-round. Because of this Republic, Laredo had flown seven flags instead of the traditional Six Flags over Texas.

The Laredo Water Museum, opened in 2017, is a facility operated by the Laredo Utilities Department which focuses on educating the public about Laredo's water infrastructure. The museum is located at 2702 Anna St. next to the Jefferson Water Treatment Plant; likewise the Rio Grande. Some topics include: water treatment, river ecology, history along the Rio Grande, and water footprints. Admission is free, and operation hours can be found on their homepage.

The Imaginarium of South Texas (formerly Laredo Children's Museum), located in a restored building on the Laredo College Fort McIntosh Campus, is a children's museum that provides a hands-on experience with science, technology, and art for Laredo's youth. A second museum was planned on the Texas A&M International University campus; however there has been no further development.

The Nuevo Santander Museum Complex is composed of restored buildings of Fort McIntosh, a historical collection of photographs of the fort, the main guardhouse, which has World War I (1914–1918) memorabilia, and a science and technology museum.

=== Art and Performing Arts ===
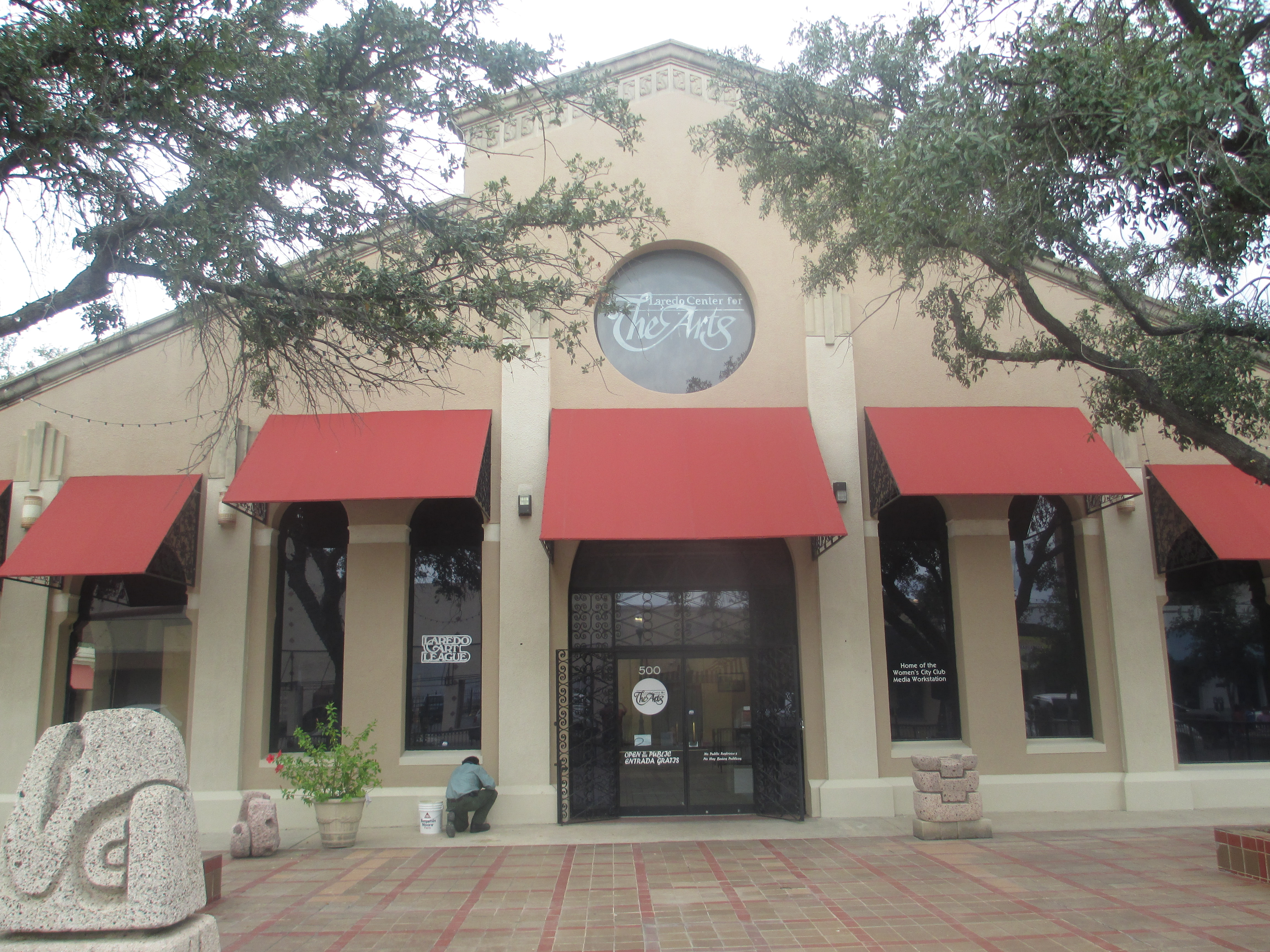
Current center for the arts entrance

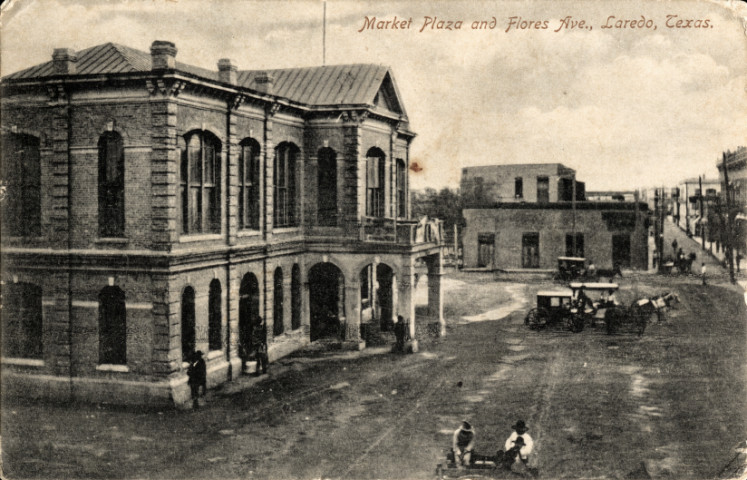
Market Plaza and Flores Avenue, Laredo, Texas (postcard, c. 1907)

The Laredo Center for the Arts(LC4A) is a non-profit gallery located in the historic city hall and market building at the Old Mercado Plaza in downtown Laredo. The center consists of one gallery and a hall: the Lilia G. Martinez Gallery and the Mezzanine Hall, respectively. The LC4A displays artwork from regional artists and provides community events for children and adults.

The Daphne Art Foundation is a non-profit gallery located on the intersection of Washington St. and Santa Maria Ave. in a former residence which also hosts regional artists and community events.

The Pan American Courts Art Complex is a multipurpose event and art center which hosts alternating food trucks, art exhibitions, the MUSA Alternative Art Space, and vendors. The site was originally a motel, the Pan American Courts and Cafe which opened on August 8, 1946.

The MUSA Alternative Art Space is an art gallery located at the Pan American Courts Art Complex.

Casa Ortiz is a historic former residence which dates from the 1830s, and is used as an event venue and art gallery.

Los Olvidados is a cafe and art gallery which hosts various artworks, performances by local musicians, and vendors markets.

The Laredo Little Theater provides Laredo with live stage performances and hosts comedians.

=== Planetarium ===
The Lamar Bruni Vergara Science Center Planetarium is on the Texas A&M International University campus. The planetarium surrounds audiences in a dome with an accurate image of the night sky showing all the motions and cycles of the Sun, Moon, planets, and constellations in the sky.

=== Libraries ===
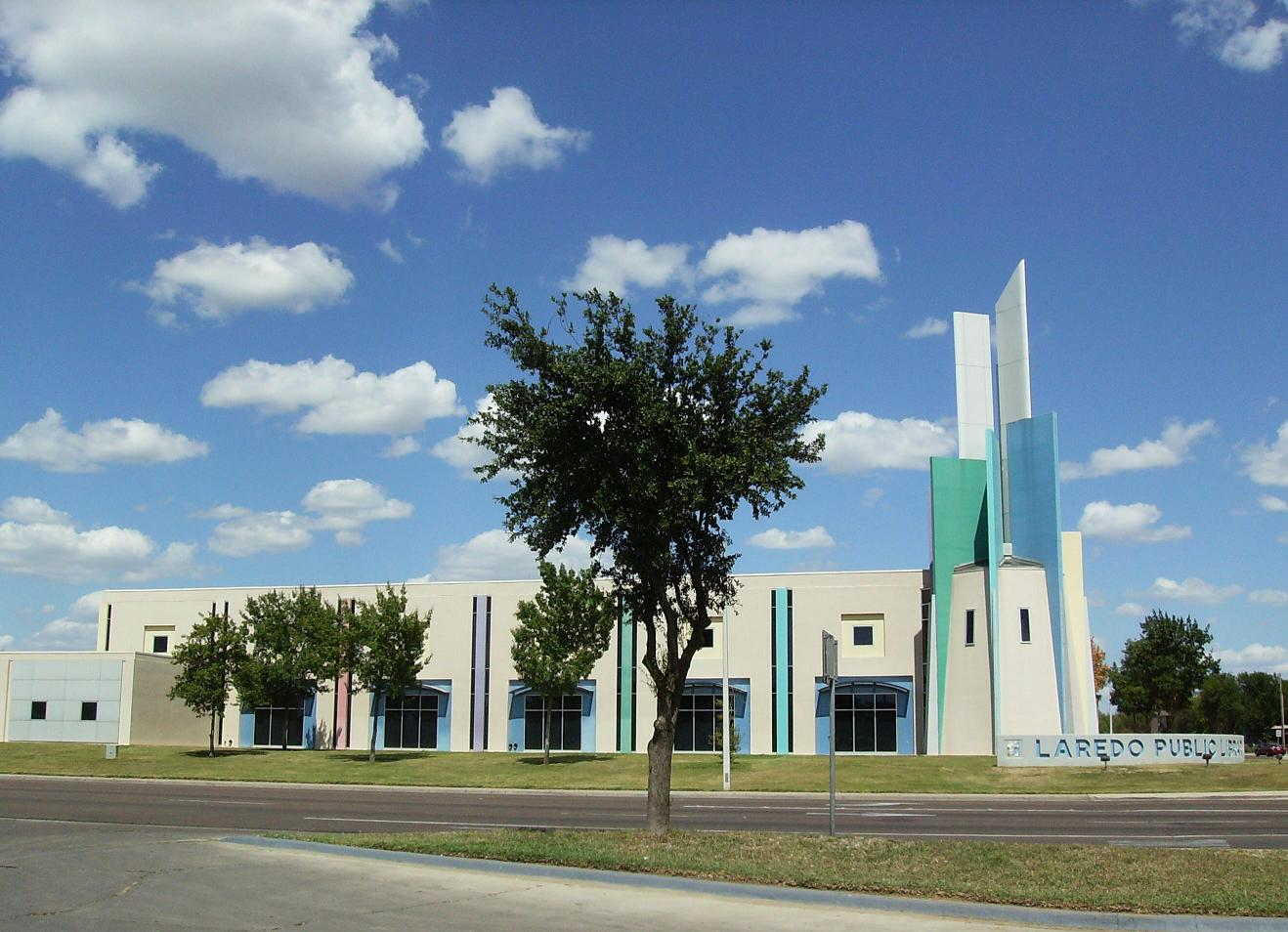
The Joe A. Guerra Laredo Public Library at the intersection of McPherson Road and Calton Street

Laredo has five libraries as of 2025. The Joe A. Guerra Laredo Public Library was first housed on the second floor of the City Hall, now known as the Laredo Center for the Arts, in 1916. In 1974, the Laredo Public Library moved to the historic Bruni Plaza in downtown Laredo. In 1993, the citizens of Laredo approved the construction of a new main library at McPherson and Calton Roads, which opened on February 1, 1998. The Laredo Public Library has a 60,000 sq ft (6,000 m^{2}).

The Joe A. Guerra Laredo Public Library, the main library, is in central Laredo; the Bruni Plaza Branch Library is downtown north of Washington Street; the Barbra Fasken Branch Library is located at the Barbra Fasken Recreation Center near Mines Road(FM 1472); the Lamar Bruni Vergara Inner City Branch Library is located in central laredo north of Lyon Street; and the Sophie Christen McKendrick, Francisco Ochoa, and Fernando A. Salinas Branch Library(McKendrick Ochoa Salinas Branch Library) is in south Laredo on U.S. Route 83.

The San Isidro Branch Library is a proposed new library in north Laredo. The location and design of the library are still pending; however, the cost is estimated to be ~4.4 Million dollars for an estimated 12,000 sq.ft.

=== Churches and architecture ===
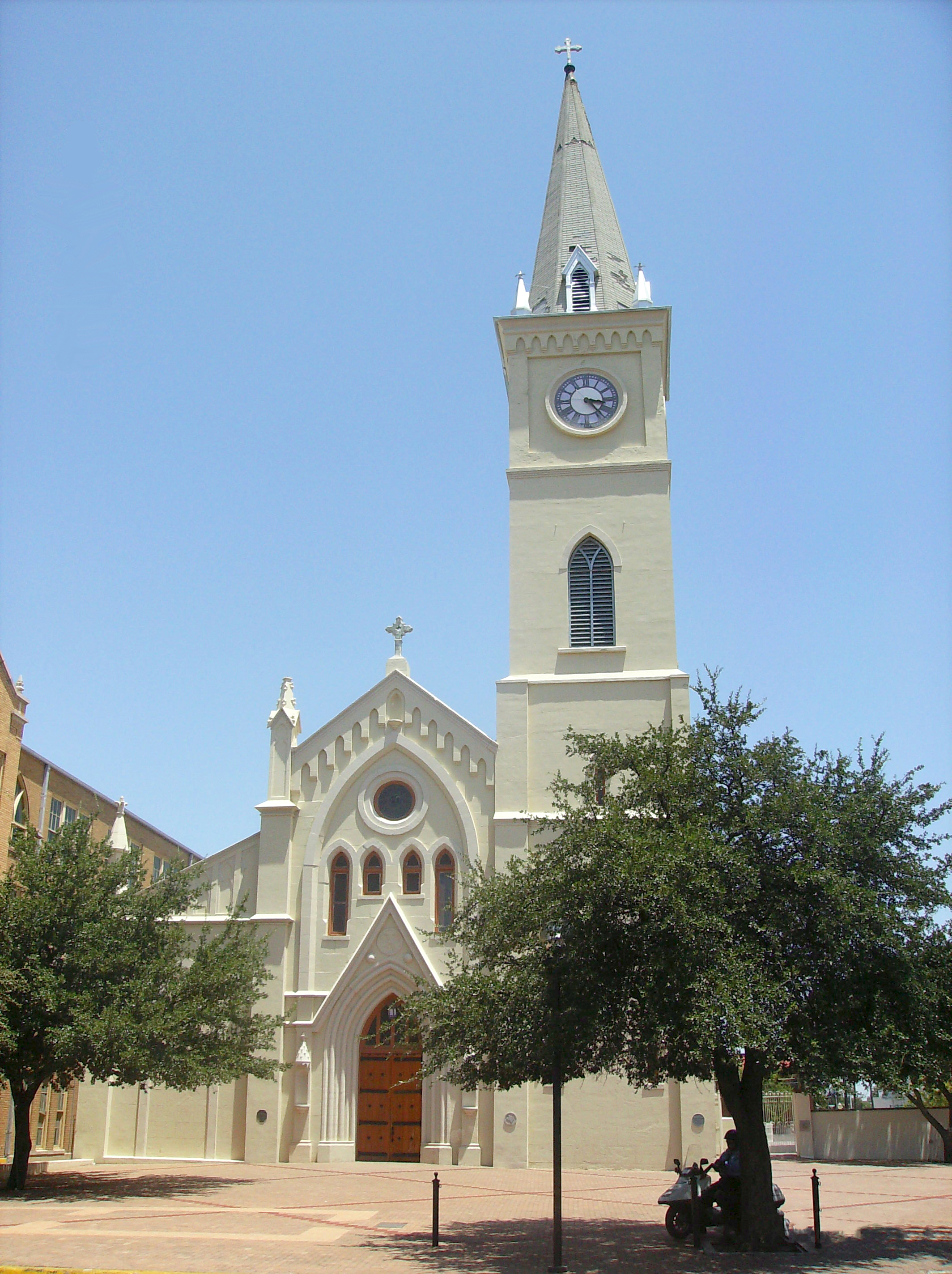
San Agustin Cathedral

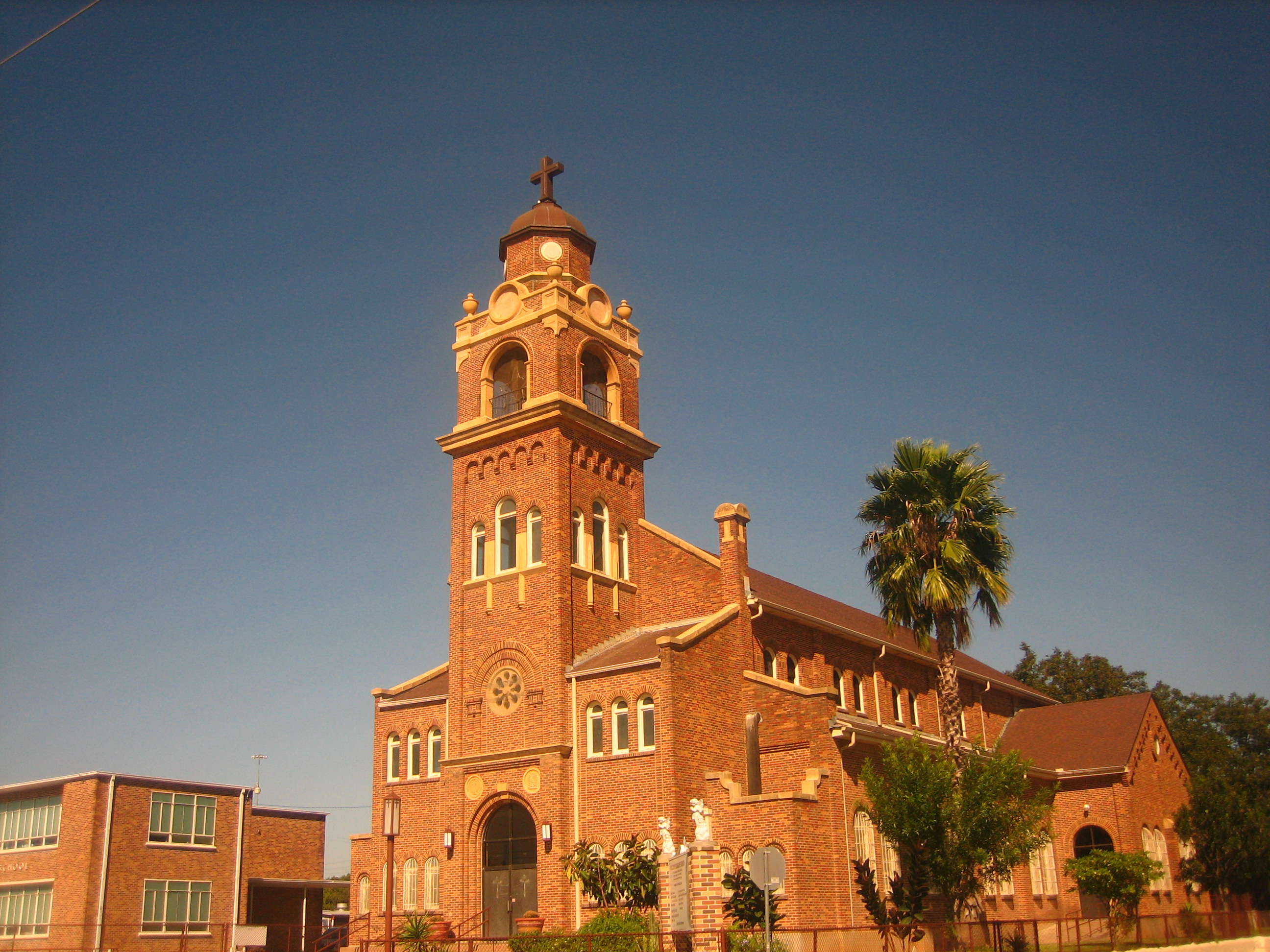
Our Lady of Guadalupe Catholic Church

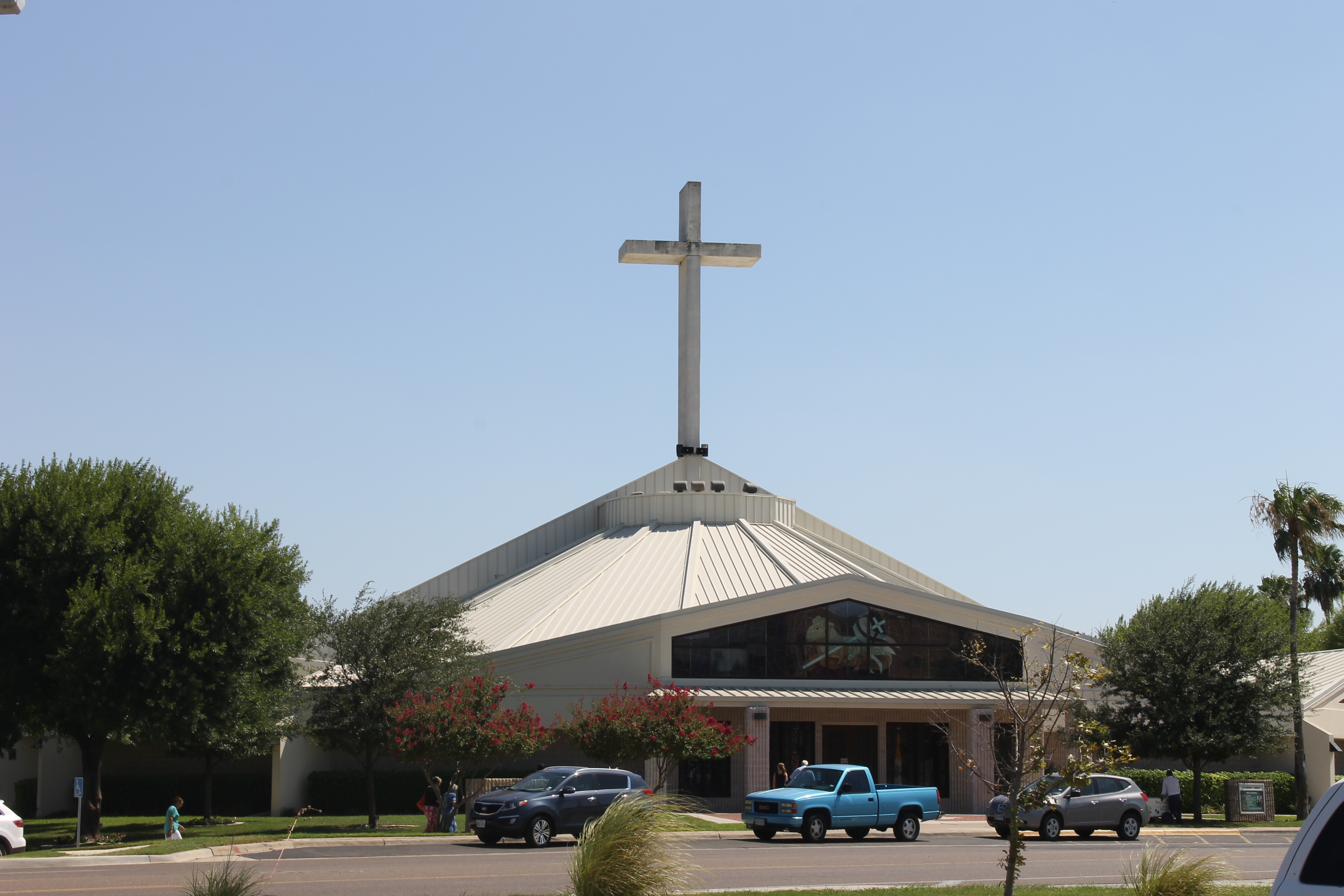
Renovated St. Patrick's Catholic Church is on Del Mar Boulevard across from the Laredo Fire Department.

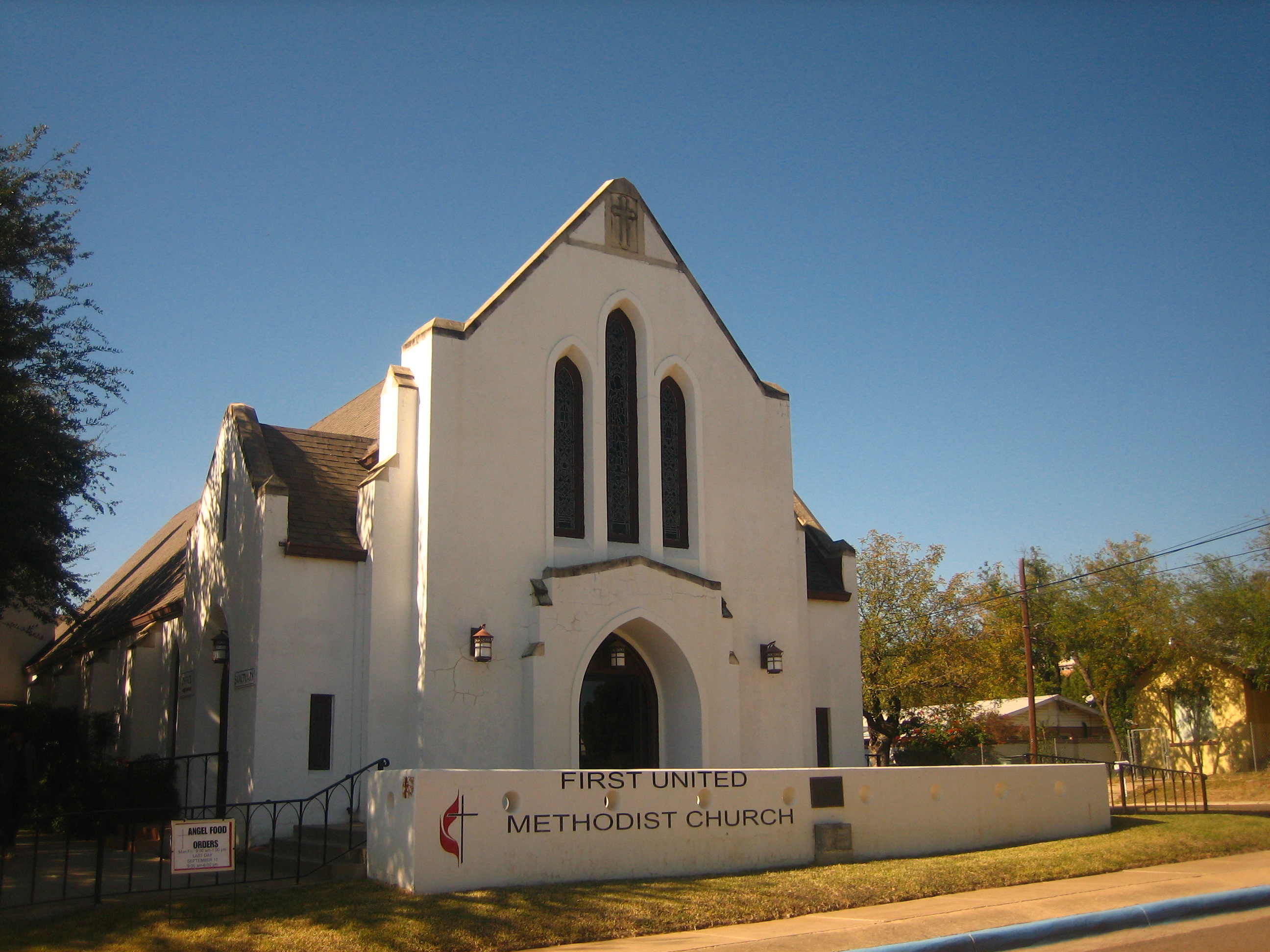
The First United Methodist Church near the intersection of McClelland and Guadalupe; the cornerstone from the 1916 building on Hidalgo Street downtown was moved to the current location in 1949.

Most of Laredo's architecture is of Spanish Colonial, American, and Mexican flavor. Most of Laredo's Spanish Colonial-style buildings are in downtown Laredo. More modern American architecture can be seen along Interstate Highway 35, as well as in the downtown area

Our Lady of Guadalupe is an imposing structure in Romanesque Revival Lombard (North Italian) style. It was designed by Leo M. J. Dielmann of San Antonio, a popular architect of Catholic buildings, and built for a Mexican-American and Hispanic congregation in the inner city, at San Jorge Avenue and Callaghan St. Dielmann was commissioned by church authorities to design churches for similar congregations in Houston and San Antonio. He also did the San Agustin parish school, and may have had a hand in the San Agustin church, itself.

Both the First United Methodist Church, in 1949, and the Christ Church Episcopal, were designed by Henry Steinbomer, a popular San Antonio architect known for designing more than 100 churches and related buildings during the 1940s and 50s.

Other Laredo churches include Baptist, Presbyterian, Lutheran, Assembly of God, Mormon, and nondenominational congregations.

==== National Register of Historic Places sites ====
- Barrio Azteca Historic District
- Fort McIntosh
- San Agustin de Laredo Historic District
- Hamilton Hotel, architects Atlee B. Ayers and Robert Ayers, the tallest building in Laredo
- U.S. Post Office, Court House, and Custom House
- Webb County Courthouse, finished 1909 to designs in the Beaux-Arts style by renowned architect Alfred Giles

==== List of the tallest buildings ====
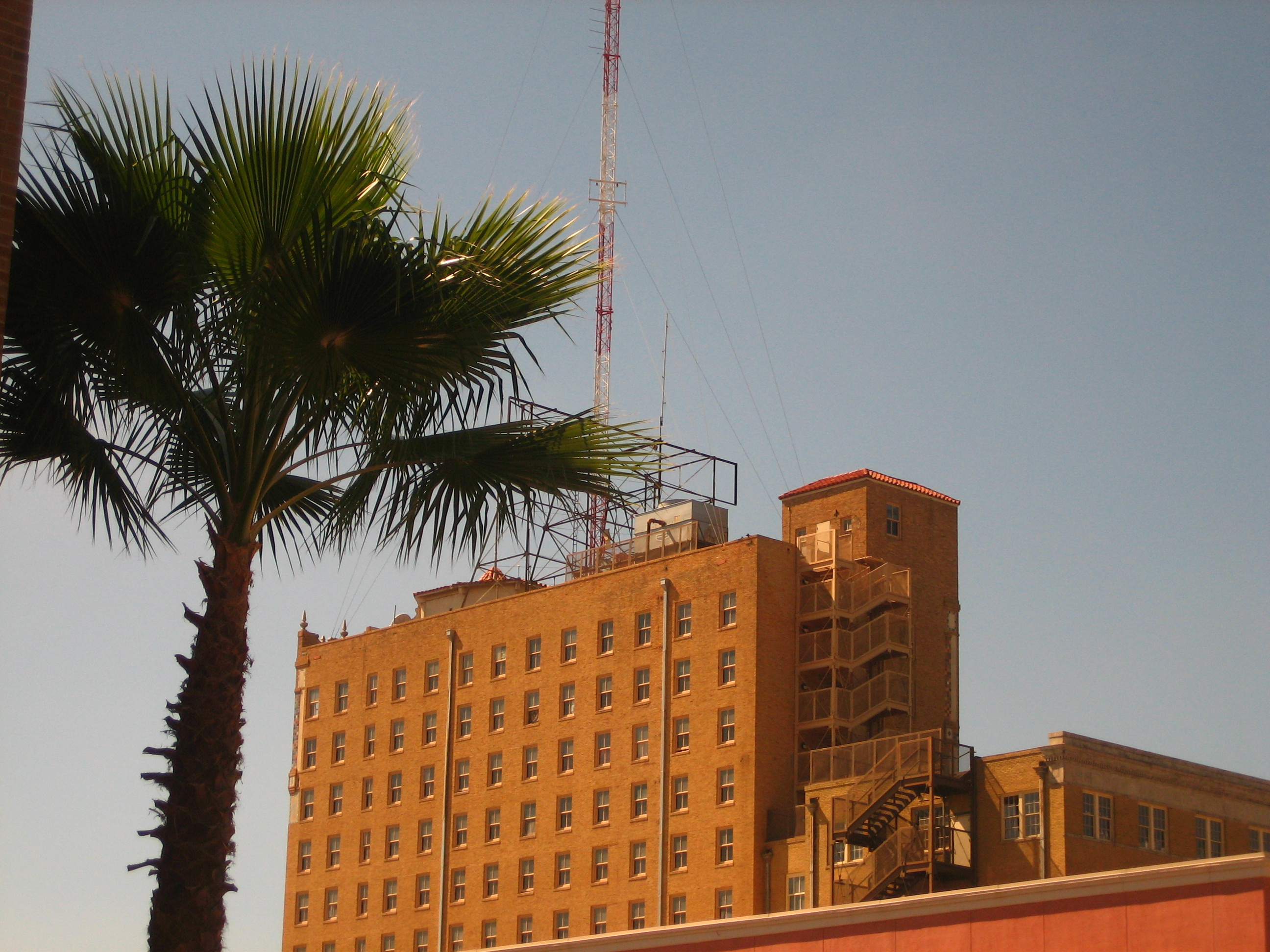
The former Hamilton Hotel, the tallest building in Laredo

Rank	Building Name	Height	Floors	Year built
01	Hamilton Hotel	150 ft (46 m)	12	1923
02	San Agustin Cathedral	141 ft (43 m)	N/A	1872
03	Rio Grande Plaza	–	15	1975
04	Holiday Inn Laredo	–	14	1984
05	Laredo National Bank	–	10	1926
06	Senior Citizens Home	–	8	–
07	Laredo Medical Center	–	7	1999
08	Gateway Inn	–	6	–
09	Rialto Hotel	–	6	1925
10	Walker Plaza	–	5	1995

=== Laredo in multimedia ===
==== Film and television ====
Streets of Laredo is a 1949 Western film starring William Holden, Macdonald Carey, and William Bendix as three outlaws who rescue a young girl, played by Mona Freeman. When they become separated, two reluctantly become Texas Rangers, while the third continues on a life of crime.

In 1958, ABC aired the second episode, "Ambush in Laredo", of the 17-part miniseries, Texas John Slaughter.

The 1959 Western film, Gunmen from Laredo, stars Robert Knapp, Walter Coy, Paul Birch, and Ron Hayes. He winds up in prison on a false murder charge, but the marshal allows him to escape to pursue the man who killed his wife.

The 1983 film Eddie Macon's Run, based on a James McLendon novel, features John Schneider as Eddie Macon, who is wrongly convicted of mostly minor crimes. While performing at a prison rodeo in Huntsville, Texas, he escapes and heads for Laredo, where he hopes to join his family in Mexico. Carl "Buster" Marzack (Kirk Douglas) is a cop in hot pursuit of Eddie. Without transportation, Eddie journeys on foot. He ends up in the woods, where he is nearly killed. He meets Jilly Buck (Lee Purcell), a bored rich girl who agrees to help him.

Lone Star is a 1996 American mystery film written and directed by John Sayles and set in a small town in Texas. The ensemble cast features Chris Cooper, Kris Kristofferson, Matthew McConaughey, and Elizabeth Peña and deals with a sheriff's investigation into the murder of one of his predecessors. The movie was filmed in Del Rio, Eagle Pass, and Laredo.

The 2011 series, Bordertown: Laredo, is a 10-episode documentary on the Arts and Entertainment Network based on the work of the narcotics unit of the Laredo Police Department.

==== Music ====
Laredo has been the subject of several songs in popular culture. One of the most popular songs is the "Streets of Laredo", originally known as "A Cowboy's Lament" and written by Frank H. Maynard, who lived mostly in Colorado. It has been recorded by artists such as Johnny Cash, Marty Robbins, Waylon Jennings, John Cale, Roy Rogers, and Prefab Sprout (who also made a lyrical reference to Laredo in an early song, "Cue Fanfare"), and is even featured in a Charlie's Angels episode ("Pretty Angels all in a Row", season two, episode three). On October 28, 1958, in the episode "The Ghost" of the ABC/WB Western series, Sugarfoot, "The Streets of Laredo" is performed by child actor Tommy Rettig. Another song is "Laredo Tornado" from the English rock band Electric Light Orchestra.

The first song on Marty Robbins' 1966 LP The Drifter was "Meet Me Tonight in Laredo".

From 1959 to 1972, the six-member singing group, The Rondels, were part the musical scene in Laredo. Members were Carlos Saenz Landin, Humberto Donovan, Roberto Alonzo, Sammy Ibarra, Joe Lee Vera and Noe Adolfo Esparza. With their disbanding, a community member recalls The Rondels "left a large void that will never be forgotten."

The song Laredo from the indie rock band Band of Horses, contained in their Grammy-nominated album Infinite Arms, was placed at number 28 in Rolling Stone magazine's top 50 songs of 2010.

== Sports ==
=== Current teams ===
==== Laredo Heat ====
The Laredo Heat is a United Soccer Leagues Premier Development League team. The team's home stadium is the Texas A&M International University Soccer Complex. The team was founded in 2004. In the 2006 season, the Laredo Heat finished runner-up, yet made it only to the first round of the Open Cup. In the 2007 season, the Laredo Heat were the Southern Conference champions and won the PDL championship. The Heat were on hiatus for the 2016 and 2017 seasons. In November 2017, the Heat announced they will be an expansion team of the National Premier Soccer League in 2018. The Heat recently announced they will also be joining the United Premier Soccer League for the 2020 season.

==== Tecolotes de los Dos Laredos ====
The Tecolotes de los Dos Laredos (Owls of the Two Laredos) are a Mexican League baseball team based in Nuevo Laredo, Tamaulipas, Mexico. The team splits their home schedule between Parque la Junta in Nuevo Laredo and Uni-Trade Stadium in Laredo.

=== Defunct teams ===
Club	Sport	League	Venue	Championships	Years active
Laredo Apaches	Baseball	Texas–Louisiana League	Veterans Field	0	1995
Laredo Broncos	Baseball	United League Baseball	Veterans Field	0	2006–2010
Laredo Bucks	Ice hockey	Central Hockey League	Laredo Energy Arena	2	2002–2012
Laredo Bucks	Ice hockey	USA Central Hockey League	Sames Auto Arena	0	2018
Laredo Honey Badgers	Indoor soccer	Professional Arena Soccer League	Laredo Energy Arena		Never
Laredo Law	Arena football	AF2	Laredo Energy Arena	0	2003–2004
Laredo Lemurs	Baseball	AAIPB	Uni-Trade Stadium	1	2012–2016
Laredo Lobos	Arena football	AF2	Laredo Energy Arena	0	2005–2007
Laredo Rattlesnakes	Indoor football	Lone Star Football League	Laredo Energy Arena	0	2011–2013
Laredo Roses	Women's Football	Sugar N Spice Football League	Uni-Trade Stadium		2012–2016
Laredo Swarm	Basketball	American Basketball Association	Laredo Energy Arena		2015–2017
Tecolotes de los Dos Laredos	Baseball	Mexican Baseball League	Veterans Field	5	1985–2004
Toros de Los Dos Laredos	Basketball	Liga Nacional de Baloncesto Profesional	Laredo Energy Arena	2	2007–2013

==== Laredo Honey Badgers ====
The Laredo Honey Badgers were a proposed professional indoor soccer team that was founded in April 2013, expected to make its debut in the Professional Arena Soccer League with the 2013–2014 season. The team was to play its home games at the Laredo Energy Arena. The official name and colors (black and chrome) of the team were decided with fan participation. However, after several delays the team postponed its launch and eventually ceased operations.

==== Laredo Lemurs ====
The Laredo Lemurs, a professional baseball team, played their first season in the independent American Association in 2012 with home games at Uni-Trade Stadium. They won the South Division in their inaugural season, but were eliminated in the first playoff round. The Lemurs won the league championship in 2015 but ceased operations after the 2016 season.

==== Laredo Roses ====
The Laredo Roses were a professional women's full contact football team in the South Texas Sugar N Spice Football League that began play in the 2012 season. The Roses played their home games at the Uni-Trade Stadium. The female players used short-shorts and half-cut jerseys during games.

==== Laredo Swarm ====
Laredo Swarm was a semi-professional basketball in the relaunched American Basketball Association. They started playing in 2015 in Laredo Energy Arena. The team was disbanded before the 2017–2018 season.

=== Stadiums and arenas ===
==== Sames Auto Arena ====
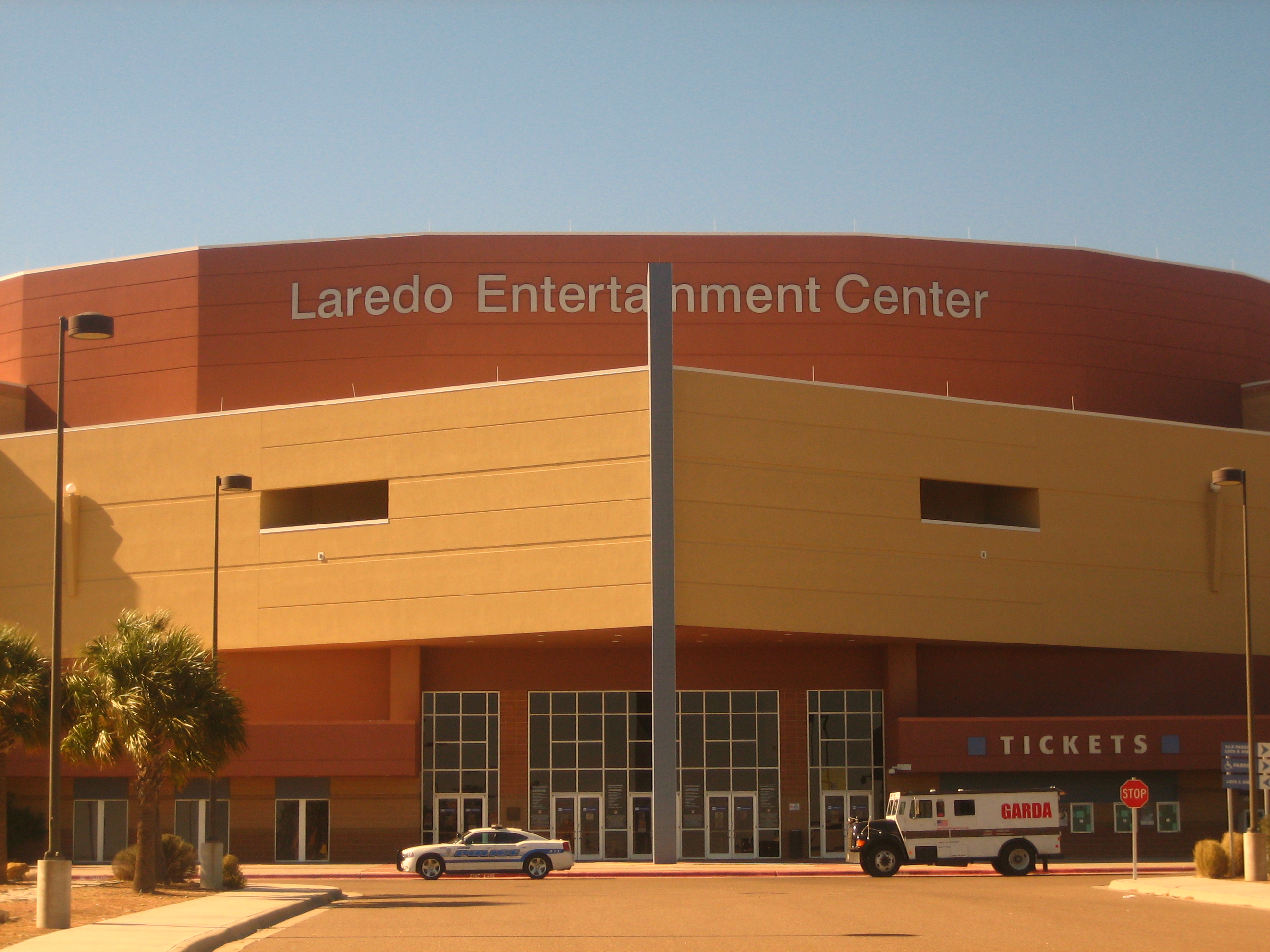
With the City of Laredo's approval on July 1, 2018, the SMG-managed venue signed a five-year contract with the oldest local dealership Sames Auto Group.

The Sames Auto Arena is at US 59/Loop 20 and Jacaman Road. The arena was strongly pushed to fruition by former Laredo Mayor Betty Flores and was home to the former Laredo Bucks. The 178,000-square-foot (16,500 m^{2}), $36.5 million facility seats 8,002 people for ice hockey and arena football, and up to 10,000 for concerts. It has fourteen luxury suites, four meeting rooms and a private club for two hundred charter members. It was completed in mid-2002 through an increase in the Laredo sales tax of .25 percent. Sports that can be played in the arena include ice hockey, arena football, indoor soccer, basketball, wrestling, and boxing. The arena has hosted many events such as The Laredo Hunting and Fishing Show, Miss Texas USA, Laredo Home and Garden Show and the South Texas Collectors Exp's Comic Con. Every year, Laredo College, TAMIU, United ISD and Laredo ISD have their graduation ceremonies here. Well-known artists and bands that have performed in the arena include Lil Wayne, Rihanna, Kesha, Pitbull, Flo Rida, Shakira, Enrique Iglesias, Tool, Aerosmith, Kiss, Elton John, Styx, REO Speedwagon, ZZ Top, Lynyrd Skynyrd, Ricky Martin, George Lopez, T.I., Ludacris, Cher, Hilary Duff, Monster Jam, and WWE.

==== Uni-Trade Stadium ====
The Uni-Trade Stadium is Laredo's newest baseball field. The stadium is near the Laredo Energy Arena. The project was approved by the city council and was voted in favor of (with 61.32% of the votes in favor 38.68% against) constructing it with money collected since 2004 by a .25 percent sales tax increase. There is a surplus of about $15 million. The stadium was home to the Laredo Lemurs of the independent American Association from 2012 to 2016. Beginning in 2018, the Tecolotes de los Dos Laredos of the Mexican League play half of their home games at the stadium and the other half at Estadio Nuevo Laredo.

==== Student Activity Complex ====
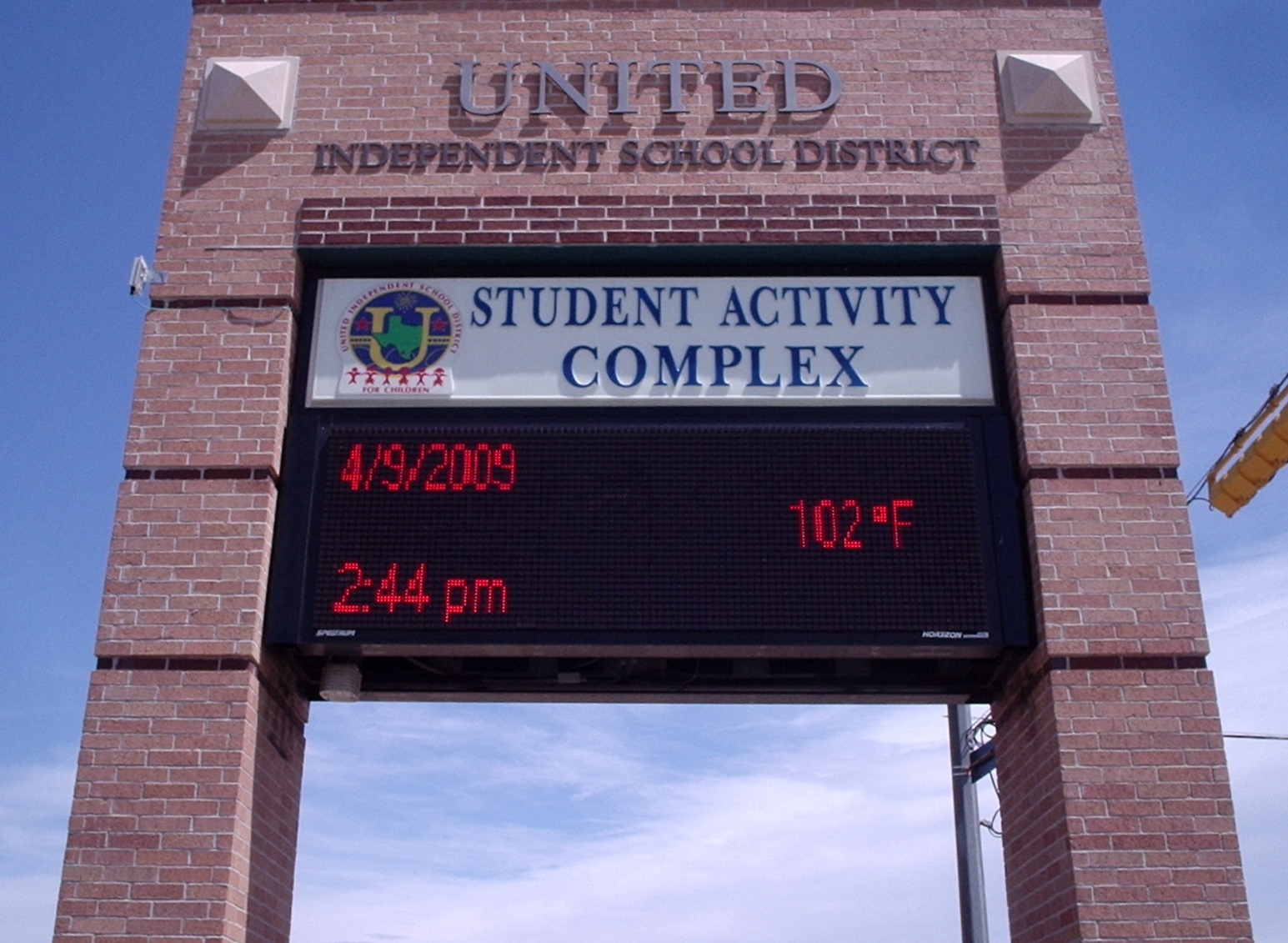
Entrance to the Student Activity Complex

United Independent School District's students use the Student Activity Complex on State Highway 359 for football, soccer, and baseball. Opened in the summer of 2002, it has the city's first artificial grass stadium. The SAC was also the home of the Laredo Heat. The capacity is 8,500 spectators.

==== Texas A&M International University Soccer Complex ====
Texas A&M International University Soccer Complex (also known as Dustdevil Field and TAMIU Soccer Complex) was built in 2006 and renovated in 2007. The soccer complex is on the Texas A&M International University campus. The complex has two soccer stadiums with a seating capacity of four thousand each. The Dustdevil Field is the new home stadium to the 2007 champion team Laredo Heat member of the United Soccer Leagues Premier Development League (PDL) and the TAMIU Dustdevils women and men's soccer teams member of the Lone Star Conference, NCAA Division II.

==== Shirley Field ====
The original Shirley Field was next to the Civic Center and R&T Martin High School on San Bernardo Avenue. It was built in 1937, along with Martin High School. Shirley Field was the location for outdoor athletics for Laredo Independent School District and also hosts the annual Border Olympics events. It seats up to about 6,000 fans with additional seating at the 2 endzones. Professional Mexican soccer teams have played various exhibition games here, noting the real grass allows for "better" soccer games. The various sports played on the stadium are football, soccer and track & field events. Major renovations are slated for this historic stadium. In November 2009 Shirley Field was demolished and was rebuilt by the 2011 football season. The total cost of the reconstruction was $12,000,000 and it now seats 8,000 fans and features artificial turf.

==== Krueger Field ====
Krueger Field is in north Laredo and is owned by United Independent School District. The stadium has a capacity of 5,000 and is used to play football and soccer high school games. It is home to United High School's football and soccer teams.

==== Veterans Field ====
Veterans Field is a 5,000 seat baseball park which was known as West Martin Field. Major renovation is happening to update the 1950 ball park. Veterans Field was also the home to the five-time champion Mexican Baseball League team Tecolotes de los Dos Laredos from 1985 to 2003. Veterans Field is also home to the Texas A&M International University's Lone Star Conference NCAA Division II Dustdevils baseball team.

==== Laredo Civic Center ====
Prior to the construction of the Laredo Energy Arena most major concerts and shows were performed at the Laredo Civic Center. The Laredo Civic Center complex has an auditorium with 1,979 seats and a banquet and exhibit hall with 1,635 seats.

== Parks and recreation ==
=== Lake Casa Blanca ===
Lake Casa Blanca International State Park features a 1,680-acre (680 ha) artificial lake and recreational activities.

=== Golf ===
Laredo has three 18-hole golf courses: the Laredo Country Club, the Casa Blanca Golf Course, and Laredo's newest course Max A. Mandel Municipal Golf Course. The Laredo Country Club is an 18-hole private course with 7,125 yards (6,515 m) of golf. The golf course has a rating of 74.6, a slope rating of 133, and has a par of 72. The country club was designed by Joseph S. Finger and was opened in 1983. The Casa Blanca Golf Course is an 18-hole course with 6,590 yards (6,030 m) of golf. The golf course has a rating of 72.5, a slope rating of 125, and has a par of 72. The golf course was designed by Leon Howard and was opened in 1967. The Max A. Mandel Municipal Golf Course is an 18-hole course with 7,200 yards (6,600 m) of golf. The golf course has a par of 72. The golf course was designed by Robert Trent Jones II Golf Course Architects and was opened in 2012.

=== Parks, recreational centers, plazas, and baseball fields ===
The City of Laredo owns eight recreational centers, thirty-four developed parks, twenty-two undeveloped parks or under construction, five baseball fields, and four plazas. The parks total area is 618 acres (2.50 km^{2}).

==== David B. Barkley Plaza (original) ====
David B. Barkley Plaza flag

A memorial honoring the forty-one Hispanic soldiers who have received the Medal of Honor was built in Laredo, Texas in 2002. The plaza was named after the only Laredo Medal of Honor recipient David B. Barkley. The David B. Barkley Plaza had a bronze statue of David B. Barkley, and had an American flag that measured 100 ft by 50 ft, with a flagpole measuring 308 ft tall, which made it the tallest in the United States from 2002 to 2005. The memorial was at 27°30′22″N 99°30′8″W.

Acuity Insurance built the former second tallest flagpole in Sheboygan, Wisconsin, which is the location of the company's headquarters in 2004, but was toppled on News Year's Eve that year due to a windstorm. The David B. Barkley Plaza flagpole was removed in 2005, and that same year Acuity Insurance built the former tallest flagpoles of the country. The second one was built in July 2005, but ended up being removed 2 years later in 2007. The third one was built in April 2008 but removed months later due to concerns over its movement in winds. The current tallest was also built by the same company in July 2014.

== Government ==
=== Municipal government ===
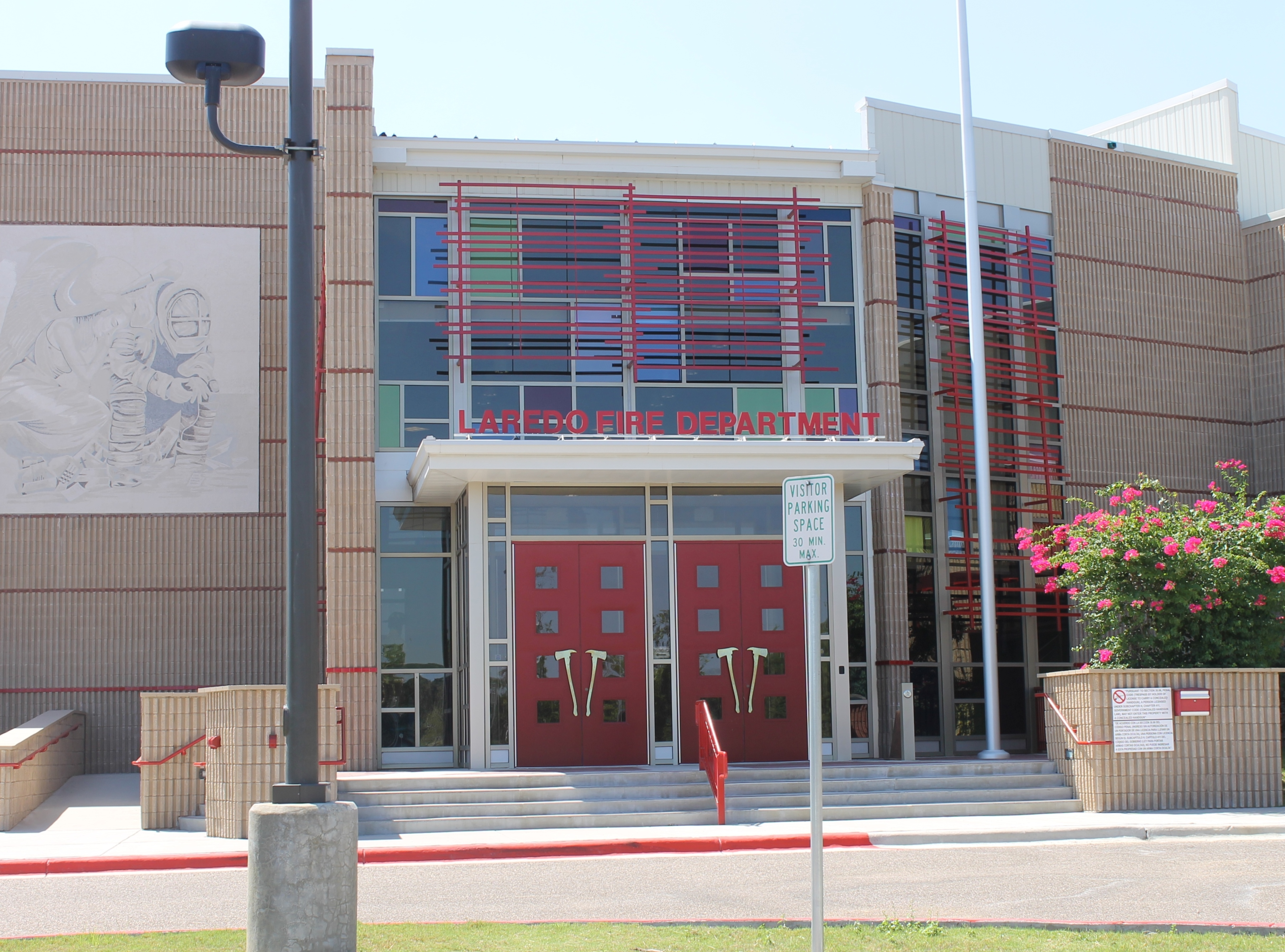
Administrative headquarters of the Laredo Fire Department are on Del Mar Boulevard across from St. Patrick's Catholic Church.

The Laredo city government is a strong city council – weak mayor system. The mayor presides over the eight-member city council, but only votes to break a tie. City Council elections are based on single-member districts and campaigns have no party affiliations. Municipal elections are now held in November (formerly in May) of even-numbered years. The municipal government is administered by the city manager hired by the city council. All city elected offices have a four-year term and are nonpartisan though most officials have a Democratic party preference or affiliation.

City council meetings are held on Mondays and can be viewed on the public-access television cable TV channel or live online at Public Access Channel live stream.

List of mayors of Laredo, Texas

Name	Portrait	Term start	Term end
William Franklin Alexander		1852	1854
Bartolome Garcia		1855	1855
Santos Benavides		1856	1856
Refugio Benavides		1857	1857
Bartolome Garcia		1858	1858
Refugio Benavides		1859	1859
Tomas Treviño		1860	1860
Juan Francisco Farias		1861	1861
Bartolome Garcia		1862	1864
Nicolas Sanchez		1865	1865
Agustin Salinas		1866	1867
Samuel M. Jarvis		1868	1868
Agustin Salinas		1866	1867
Hugh James		1874	1876
Atanacio Vidaurri		1877	1877
Rosendo Garcia		1878	1878
Julian Garcia		1879	1880
Porfirio Benavidez		1881	1882
Dario Sanchez		1883	1883
Porfirio Benavides		1884	1884
Dario Sanchez		1885	1885
E.A. Atlee		1886	1890
C.A. McLane		1891	1894
Andrew Hans Thaison		1895	1895
L.J. Christian		1896	1898
A.E. Vidaurri		1899	1900
Amador Sanchez		1901	1909
Robert McComb		1910	1919
L. Villegas		1920	1925
Albert Martin		1926	1939
Hugh Cluck		1940	1953
J.C. Martin Jr.		1954	1977
Aldo Tatangelo		1978	1990
Saul N. Ramirez Jr.		1990	1997
Betty Flores		1998	2006
Raul G. Salinas		2006	2014
Pete Saenz		2014	2022
Victor Treviño		2022	

The council then named the assistant city manager, Horacio De Leon, as the acting city manager. Robert Alexander Eads was selected as City Manager on March 4, 2020.

=== State and federal representation ===
The United States District Court for the Southern District of Texas Laredo division is a relatively new building adjacent to the Webb County Courthouse.

The United States Border Patrol Laredo Sector Headquarters is at 207 W. Del Mar Blvd, Laredo, Texas.

The United States Postal Service operates its main Post Office at 2700 East Saunders Street south of Laredo International Airport. Postal branches are downtown and at 2395 East Del Mar Boulevard.

The Texas Army National Guard armory is at 6001 E. Bob Bullock Loop 20 Laredo, Texas.

The Colburn Memorial United States Army Reserve Center is at 1 W End Washington St, Laredo, Texas.

The Texas Department of Criminal Justice (TDCJ) operates the Laredo Parole Office.

The private prison operator GEO Group runs the Rio Grande Detention Center in Laredo, which opened in 2008 and holds a maximum of 1900 federal detainees.

== Education ==
=== Elementary and secondary ===
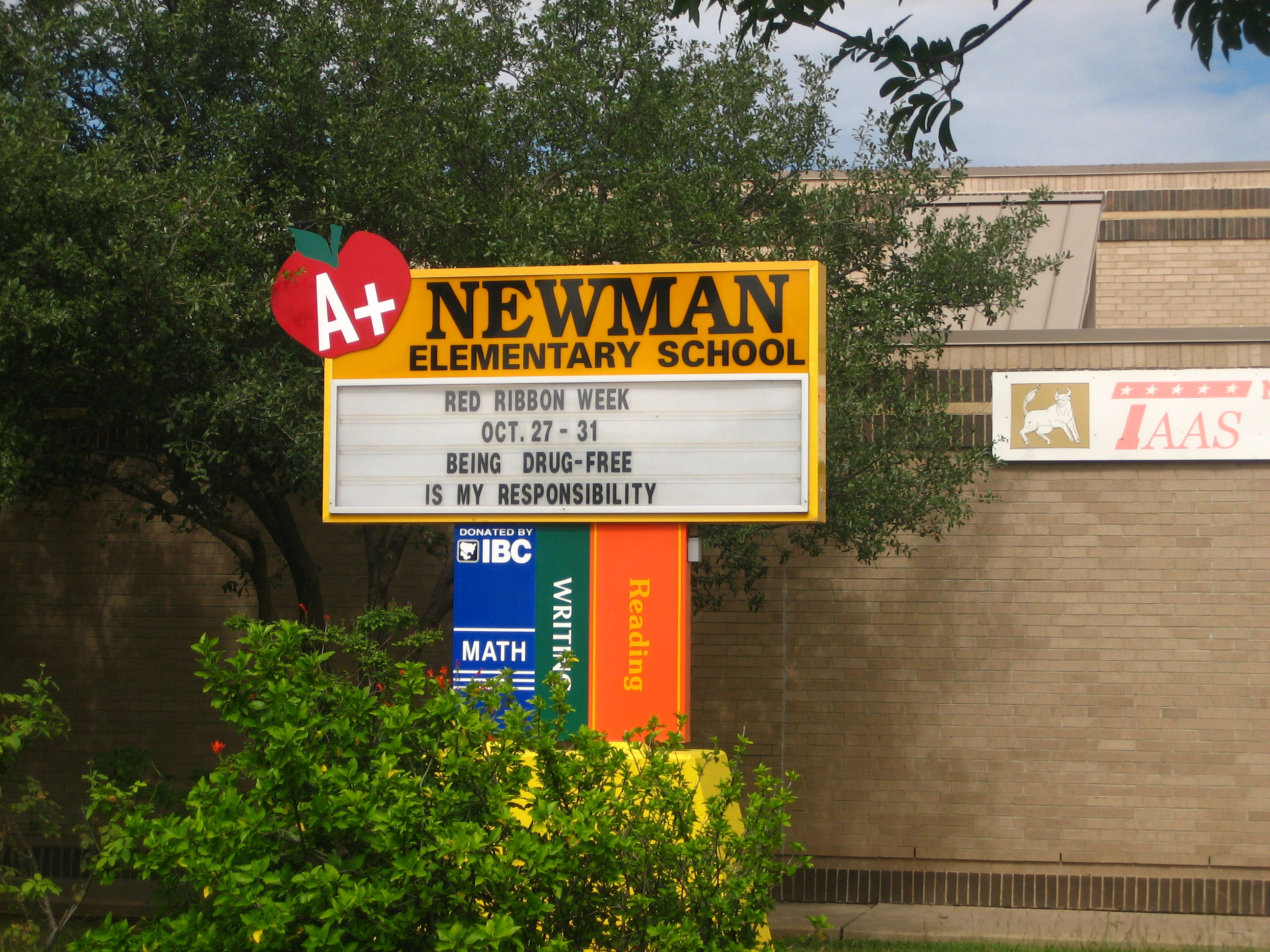
Newman Elementary School at 1300 Alta Vista Blvd. is named for the late businessman B. P. Newman and his widow, Peggy.

Two school districts, the Laredo Independent School District and the United Independent School District, and eight private schools serve Laredo.

The Laredo Independent School District (LISD) serves the areas in central Laredo. The LISD high schools are Cigarroa High School, Martin High School, J. W. Nixon High School and the Laredo Early College High School. LISD also has three magnet schools: Dr. Dennis D. Cantu Health Science Magnet School, LISD Magnet for Engineering and Technology Education, and Vidal M. Trevino School of Communications and Fine Arts.

The United Independent School District serves the rest of Laredo and northern Webb County. The UISD high schools are John B. Alexander High School, Lyndon B. Johnson High School, Laredo Early College High School, United High School, and United South High School. UISD has three magnet schools: John B. Alexander Health Science Magnet, United Engineering Magnet, and the United South Business Magnet. There are thirty-nine schools within UISD and more are under construction or development. United ISD is one of the state's fastest growing districts, serving almost forty thousand students and covering an area the physical size of Rhode Island.

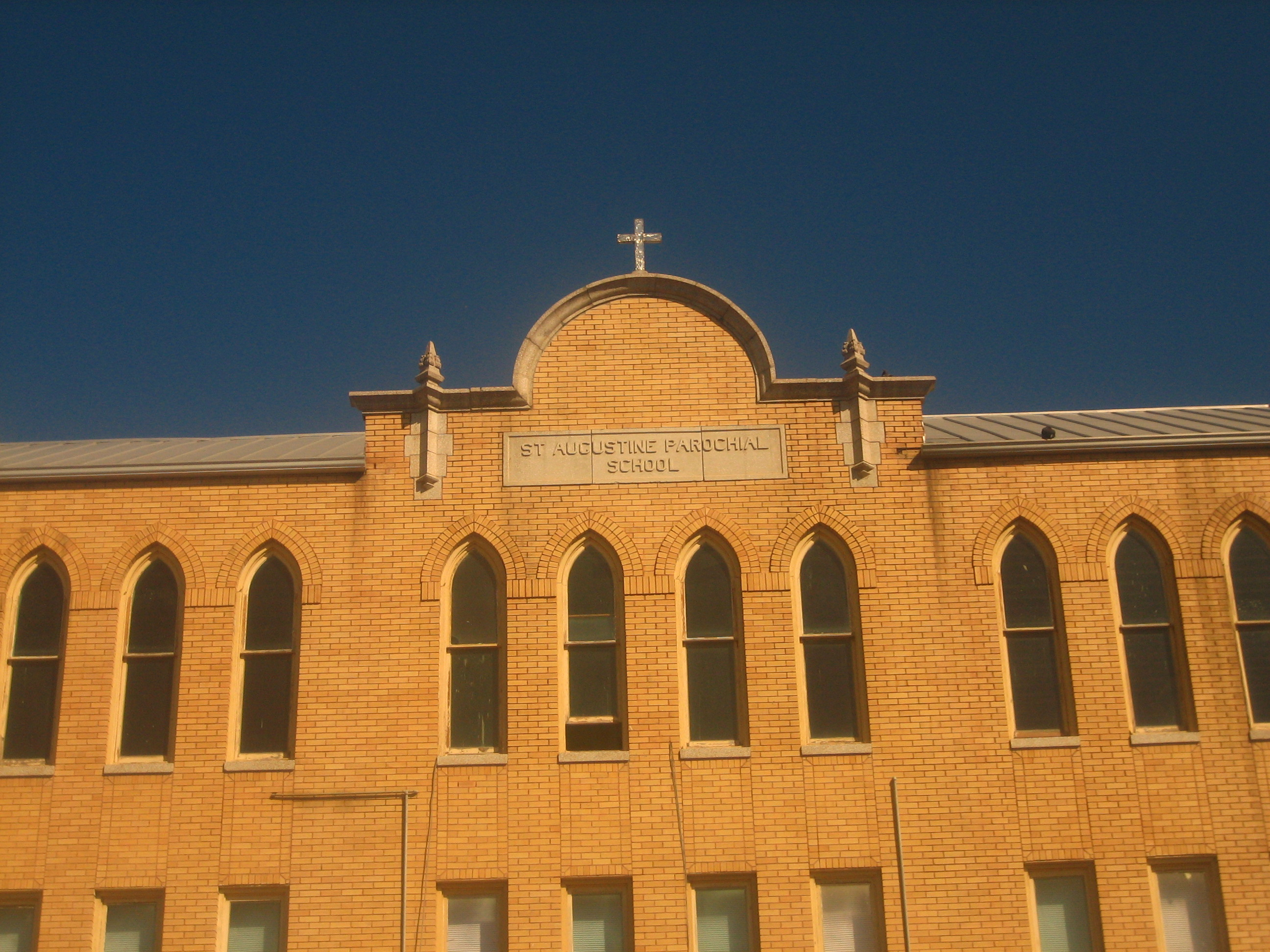
Former downtown campus of St. Augustine Parochial School

Several private schools also serve the city:

- Saint Augustine High School, Catholic school, 9th–12th
- Laredo Christian Academy, Assemblies of God, Grades PK–12th
- United Day School, PK–8th
- Mary Help of Christians School, Catholic school, PK–8th
- Blessed Sacrament School, Catholic school, PK–7th
- Our Lady of Guadalupe School, Catholic school, PK–6th
- St. Peter Memorial School, Catholic school, PK–6th
- Saint Augustine School, Catholic school, now elementary and middle, PK–8th, established 1928, enrollment 485 (2008)

The city also has several charter schools, including:

- Gateway Academy K–12

=== Colleges and universities ===
Laredo is home to three higher education institutions Laredo College (LC), Texas A&M International University (TAMIU), and the University of Texas Education and Research Center at Laredo (UT Center at Laredo).

Laredo College is a two-campus institution which offers two-year Associate's degrees. The main campus, Laredo College Fort McIntosh Campus, is at the western end of downtown Laredo near the Rio Grande, on the site of the former Fort McIntosh. This fort played a major role in the development of Laredo, as it protected the community from Indian raids in its early history. Several of the old buildings at the fort were converted into classrooms, but after renovation programs nearly all of the campus structures are now modern. The smaller, newer second campus, Laredo College South Campus, is in south Laredo along U. S. Route 83.

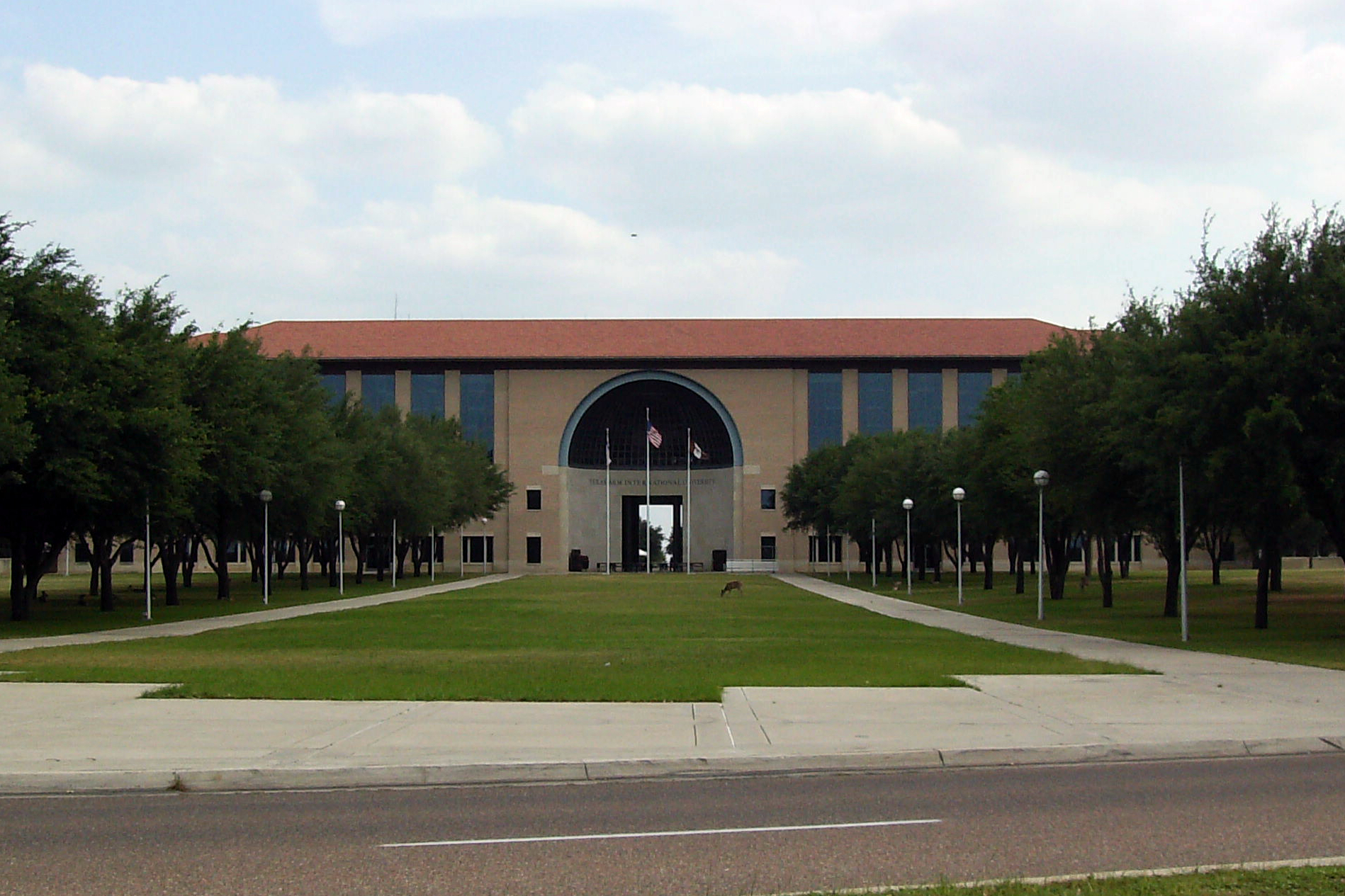
Texas A&M International University Library

Texas A&M International University, one of the member schools of the Texas A&M University System, offers bachelor's, master's, and doctoral degrees. On April 22, 2004, the Texas Higher Education Coordinating Board in Austin, Texas approved Texas A&M International University to grant its first PhD in International Business Administration. The university was an extension of Texas A&I-Kingsville and later the former Laredo State University.

The UT Center at Laredo is located north of Business U.S. Highway 59 at the intersection of McPherson Road and Bustamante Street and neighbors the Laredo Medical Center hospital. The center offers graduate certificates, bachelors degrees, and doctoral degrees in various health related fields from five UT System institutions.

== Media ==
=== Newspapers ===
Name	Frequency	Language	City
Laredo Morning Times	Daily	English	Laredo
LareDOS (Defunct, 2014)	Monthly	English	Laredo
El Mañana / Laredo Sun	Daily	Spanish / English	Nuevo Laredo/Laredo
El Lider Informativo	Daily	Spanish	Nuevo Laredo
El Diario de Nuevo Laredo	Daily	Spanish	Nuevo Laredo
Primera Hora	Daily	Spanish	Nuevo Laredo
Última Hora	Daily	Spanish	Nuevo Laredo

=== Television ===
According to Nielsen Media Research, the Laredo region (which includes Webb and Zapata counties) is ranked 185th market by population size in the United States. The first station to broadcast in Laredo was KGNS in 1956, followed by KVTV in 1973, then KJTB (now KLDO) in 1985.

The only notable television network missing from Laredo's airwaves is PBS or Cozi TV. Laredo had a full-power local The CW affiliate, KGNS-DT2, but on July 3, 2014, the affiliation switched to ABC. Prior to that KJTB channel 27, from January 1985 to October 1988 was Laredo's ABC affiliate. KJTB was later bought by Entravision and affiliated the station to Telemundo and changed its callsign to KLDO. Today KLDO is affiliated to Univision. Before KJTB, KGNS, an NBC affiliate had a secondary affiliation to ABC from its founding in 1956 through KJTB's founding in 1985. On November 6, 2013, KGNS reached an agreement to add the ABC affiliation. The ABC affiliate launched in July 2014 when KGNS dropped The CW programming and added ABC programming. In October 2015 KVTV now KYLX started broadcasting The CW Programming on its digital subchannel 13.2.

In December 2014, all Nuevo Laredo stations turned off analog television broadcasting and started broadcasting digitally only.

VC	DT	DTV	Dish	Spectrum	Callsign	Network	Resolution	City of License
1.1	23.1	•	•	98	XHLNA	Azteca Uno	HD 1080i	Nuevo Laredo
1.2	23.2	•	•	•	XHLNA-TDT2	ADN 40	SD 480i	Nuevo Laredo
2.1	29.1	•	•	•	XHLAR	Las Estrellas	HD 1080i	Nuevo Laredo
3.1	35.1	•	•	•	XHCTNL	Imagen Televisión	HD 1080i	Nuevo Laredo
3.4	35.4	•	•	•	XHCTNL-TDT4	Excélsior TV	SD 480i	Nuevo Laredo
4.1	25.1	•	•	14	XHBR	Televisa Nuevo Laredo	HD 1080i	Nuevo Laredo
5.1	25.1	•	•	•	XHBR-TDT2	Canal 5	SD 480i	Nuevo Laredo
6.1	32.1	•	•	15	XHNAT	Multimedios Plus	HD 720p	Nuevo Laredo
6.2	32.2	•	•	•	XHNAT-TDT2	Milenio TV	SD 480i	Nuevo Laredo
6.3	32.3	•	•	•	XHNAT-TDT3	Teleritmo	SD 480i	Nuevo Laredo
6.4	32.4	•	•	•	XHNAT-TDT4	MVS TV	SD 480i	Nuevo Laredo
7.1	33.2	•	•	•	XHLAT-TDT	Azteca 7	HD 1080i	Nuevo Laredo
7.2	33.9	•	•	•	XHLAT-TDT2	a+	SD 480i	Nuevo Laredo
8.1	8.3	8	8	10	KGNS	NBC	HD 1080i	Laredo
8.2	8.4	12	15	9	KGNS-DT2	ABC	HD 720p	Laredo
8.3	8.5	•	16	25	KGNS-DT3	Telemundo	HD 720p	Laredo
8.4	8.6	•	•	•	KGNS-DT4	Ion Television	SD 480i	Laredo
8.5	8.7	•	•	•	KGNS-DT5	True Crime Network	SD 480i	Laredo
8.6	8.8	•	•	•	KGNS-DT6	Ion Plus	SD 480i	Laredo
10.1	10.1	•	16	25	KXNU	Telemundo	HD 720p	Laredo
10.2	10.2	13	13	6	KXNU	CBS	SD 480p	Laredo
•	•	•	•	11	KLRN	PBS	Analog	San Antonio
13.1	13.3	13	13	6	KYLX	CBS	HD 1080i	Laredo
13.2	13.4	9	•	19	KYLX-LD2	The CW	SD 480i	Laredo
15.1	15.1	•	•	•	KLMV	MeTV	SD 480i	Laredo
15.2	15.2	•	•	•	KLMV-LD2	Estrella TV	SD 480i	Laredo
15.3	15.3	•	•	•	KLMV-LD3	Movies!	SD 480i	Laredo
15.4	15.4	•	•	•	KLMV-LD4	Jewelry TV	SD 480i	Laredo
17.1	17.1	•	•	99	XEFE	Once TV	HD 1080i	Nuevo Laredo
27.1	19.1	•	27	78.1	KLDO	Univision	HD 1080i	Laredo
27.2	19.2	•	•	1248	KLDO-DT2	LATV	SD 480i	Laredo
27.3	19.3	•	•	•	KLDO-DT3	TBD	SD 480i	Laredo
27.4	19.4	•	•	•	KLDO-DT4	Stadium	SD 480i	Laredo
27.5	19.5	•	•	•	KLDO-DT5	Court TV	SD 480i	Laredo
31.1	31.1	39	39	16	KXOF	Fox / MyNet	HD 720p	Laredo
31.2	31.2	•	•	•	KXOF-CD2	Grit	SD 480i	Laredo
31.3	31.3	•	•	•	KXOF-CD3	Laff	SD 480i	Laredo
39.1	27.1	•	•	77	KETF	Unimas	HD 720p	Laredo
39.2	27.2	•	•	•	KETF-CD2	Comet	SD 480i	Laredo
39.3	27.3	•	•	•	KETF-CD3	Charge!	SD 480i	Laredo
39.4	27.4	•	•	4	KETF-CD4	Azteca America	HD 720p	Laredo

=== Radio ===
According to Arbitron, the Laredo region (which includes Jim Hogg, Webb, and Zapata counties) is ranked 191st market by population size.

==== AM radio ====
Frequency	Callsign	Brand	City of License
530	WPMQ285	TxDOT HAR	Laredo
790	XEFE	La Mera Ley	Nuevo Laredo
890	KVOZ	Radio Cristiana	Laredo
960	XEK	La Grande	Nuevo Laredo
1000	XENLT	Radio Formula	Nuevo Laredo
1090	XEWL	La Romantica	Nuevo Laredo
1300	KLAR	Radio Poder	Laredo
1340	XEBK	Mega 95.7	Nuevo Laredo
1370	XEGNK	Radio Mexicana	Nuevo Laredo
1410	XEAS	Ke Buena	Nuevo Laredo
1490	KLNT	Super Tejano	Laredo
1550	XENU	La Rancherita	Nuevo Laredo
1610	WQA200	CBP Information	Laredo

==== FM radio ====
Frequency	Callsign	Brand	Format	City of License
88.1	KHOY	Catholic Radio	Religious	Laredo
88.9	XHLDO	Radio Tamaulipas	Public Radio	Nuevo Laredo
89.9	KBNL	Radio Manantial	Spanish religious	Laredo
91.3	XHNOE	Stereo 91	Spanish Contemporary	Nuevo Laredo
92.7	KJBZ	Z93	Tejano	Laredo
93.7	"XHNLT"^{PR}	Radio Estereo Uncion FM	Christian Radio	Nuevo Laredo
94.1	XHTLN	Imagen / RMX Laredo	Talk / Contemporary	Nuevo Laredo
94.9	KQUR	Digital 94.9	Spanish Pop	Laredo
95.3	XHLPZ	La Traviesa	Spanish Regional	Lampazos
95.7	XHBK	Mega 95.7	Spanish Contemporary	Nuevo Laredo
96.5	"XHTWO"^{PR}	Radio Two	Norteño	Nuevo Laredo
97.1	XHNLO	La Caliente	Norteño	Nuevo Laredo
98.1	KRRG	Big Buck Country	Country	Laredo
99.3	XHNK	40 Principales	Top 40	Nuevo Laredo
100.1	none	The Blitz	Classic Rock and Heavy Metal	Laredo
100.5	KBDR	La Ley	Tejano	Laredo
101.5	XHAS	Ke Buena	Norteño	Nuevo Laredo
102.3	XHMW	Stereo Vida	AC/Oldies	Nuevo Laredo
102.9	none^{PR}	La Guerrera de la Frontera	International	Nuevo Laredo
103.3	none^{PR}	XRock	Classic rock	Nuevo Laredo
104.5	none^{PR}	2 Beat	Electronica	Nuevo Laredo
104.9	XHNLR	Radio UAT	University Radio	Nuevo Laredo
105.1	none^{PR}	RN Radio	Spanish	Nuevo Laredo
105.5	none^{PR}	Mas Musica	Spanish	Nuevo Laredo
106.1	KNEX	Hot 106.1	Urban / Rhythmic Top 40	Laredo
106.5	none^{PR}	Radio Voz	Norteño	Nuevo Laredo
107.3	XHGTS	107.3 Me Gusta	Spanish Pop	Nuevo Laredo
162.55	WXK26	NOAA Weather Radio	Weather	Laredo

^{PR}:Suspected pirate radio stations since they are not licensed with Federal Communications Commission (FCC) in the United States or COFETEL in Mexico. Some pirate stations are suspected, due to the fact other licensed stations nearby share the same frequency, such as 106.5 Radio Voz and KMAE from nearby Bruni, Texas and 103.3 Radio 33 and XHAHU-FM from nearby Anáhuac, Nuevo León, each city less than 50 miles from Laredo.

== Infrastructure ==
=== Health care ===
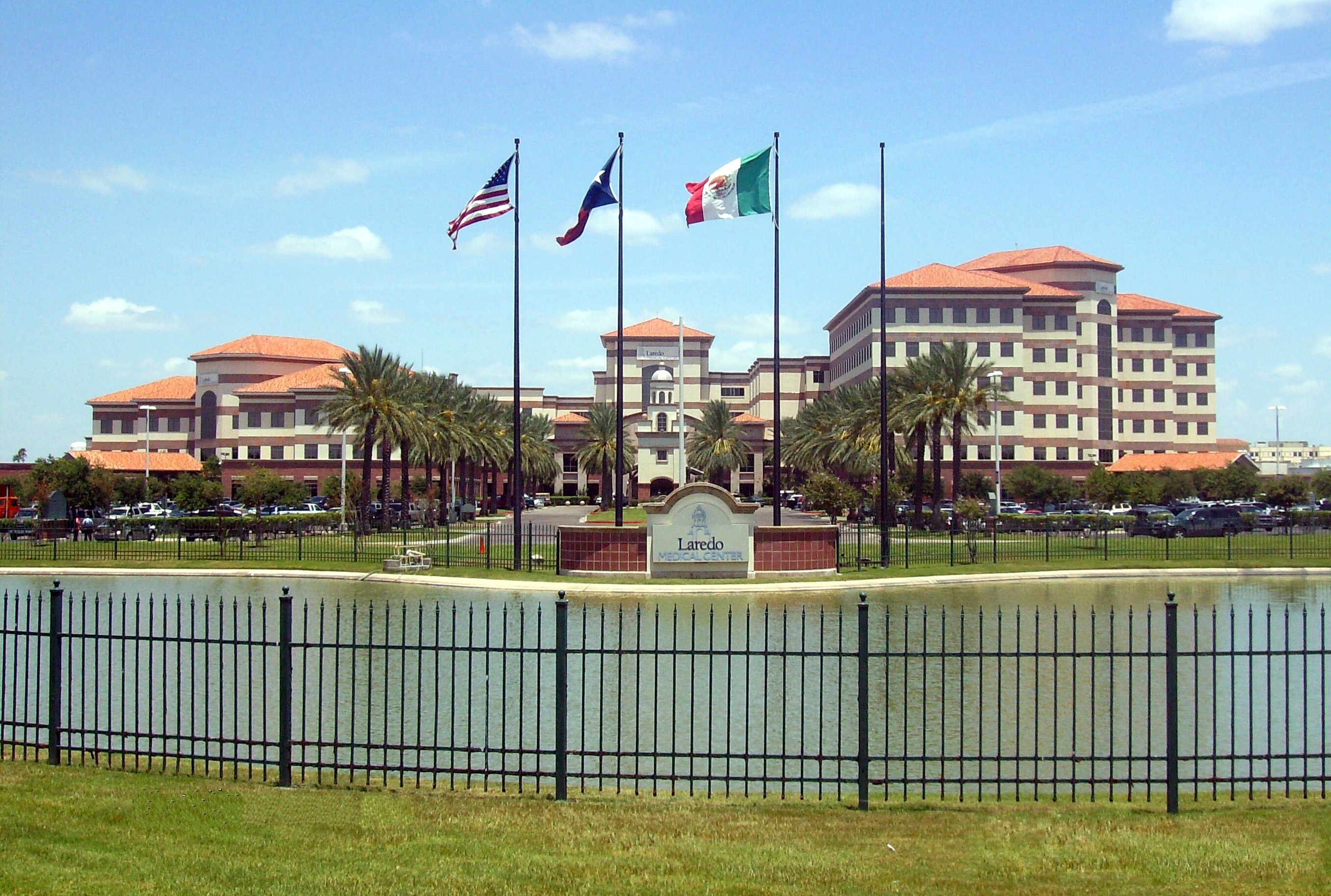
Laredo Medical Center, formerly Mercy Hospital, is the largest hospital in Laredo.

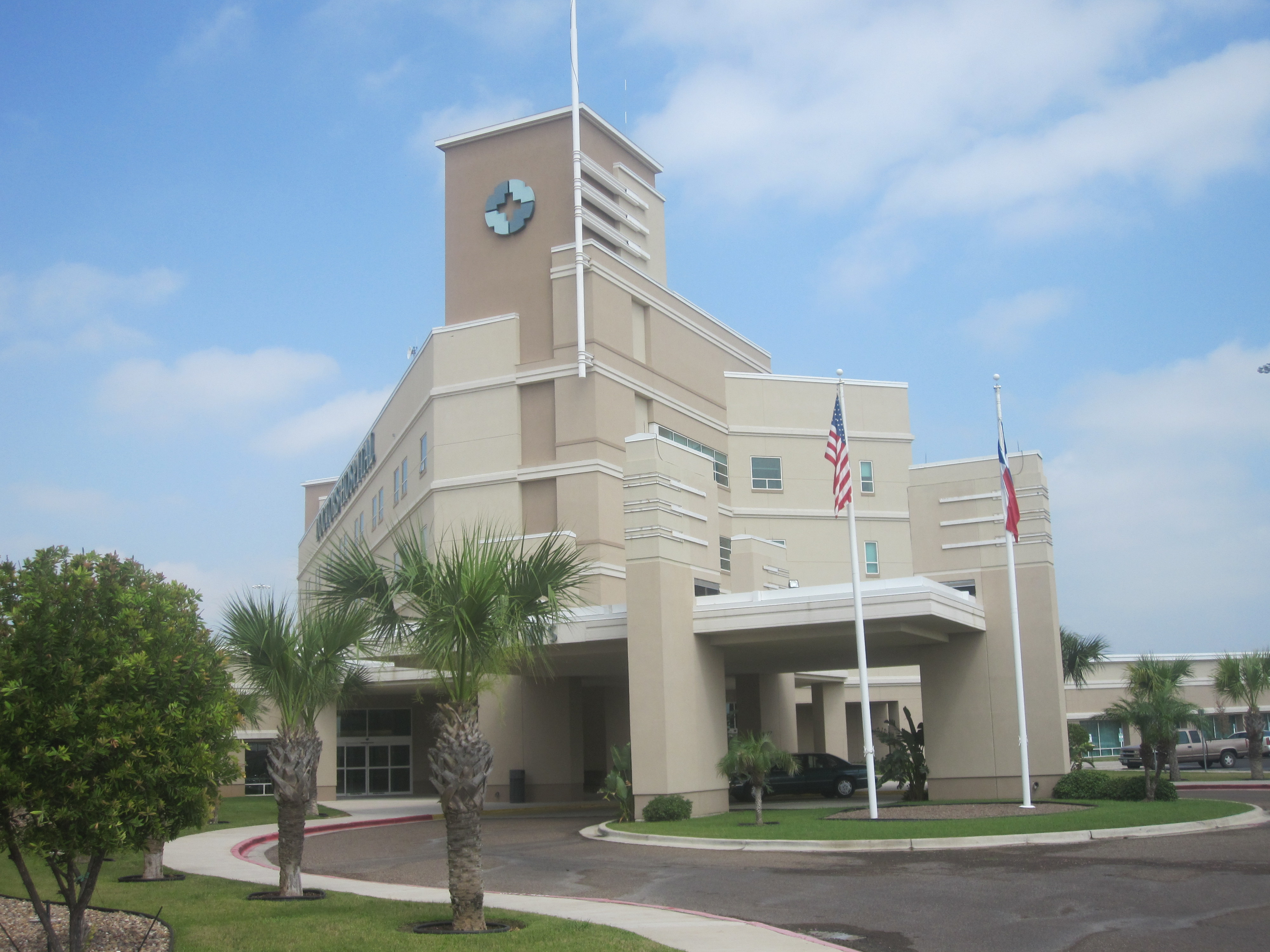
Doctor's Hospital in Laredo

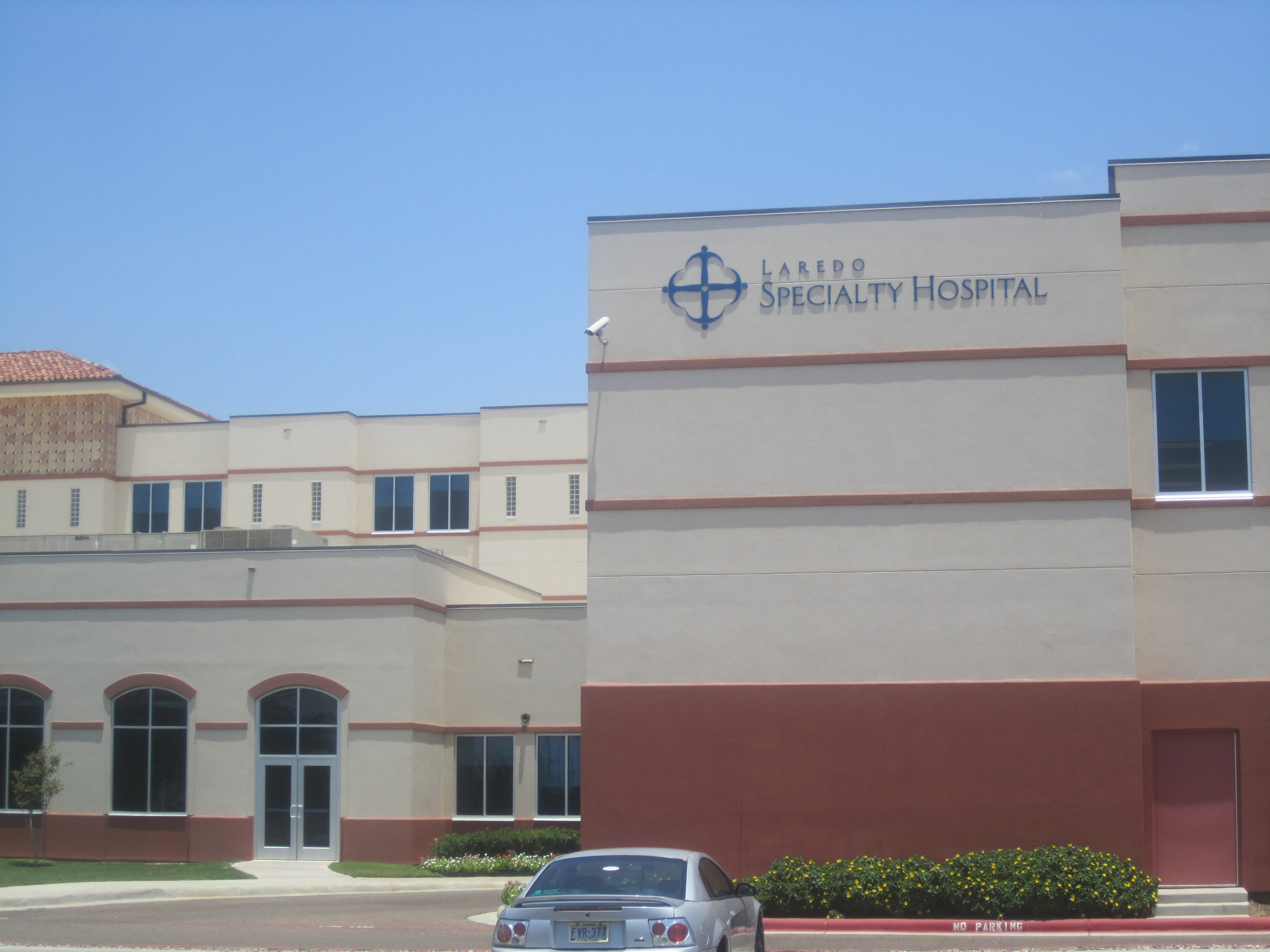
Laredo Specialty Hospital, near the Laredo Medical Center, handles certain patients requiring long-term care.

In addition to the University of Texas Health Science Center branch, there are five other principal medical centers in Laredo: the Laredo Medical Center, Doctor's Hospital, Gateway Community Health Center, Providence Surgical & Medical Center, and the Laredo Specialty Hospital.

Doctors Hospital is Laredo's second-largest medical center. The hospital complex is over 250,000 square feet (23,000 m^{2}), with 180 licensed beds on a 58-acre (23 ha) campus. Affiliated with Universal Health Services, it is on Loop 20 in north Laredo. The Doctors Regional Cancer Treatment Center offers comprehensive cancer services.

The Providence Surgical & Medical Center is an ambulatory health care center in north-central Laredo and also owned by Universal Health Services.

The Gateway Community Health Center is the third-largest medical center in Laredo. The health center's main building is 64,000 square feet (5,900 m^{2}). The Medical center moved to its new $11,000,000 building in 2006. The main Gateway Community Health Center is in East Laredo, close to U.S. Highway 59. It also has three branches in the Laredo area: the South Clinic, El Cenizo Community Center, and Quad City Community Center.

Gateway Community Health Center services include:

The Laredo Specialty Hospital is the fourth-largest medical center in Laredo. It is owned by Ernest Health Inc. and was founded by Elmo Lopez Jr. on May 22, 2006. It admitted its first patient within hours of operation. The grand opening took place in March 2007.

=== Transportation ===
In 2016, 82.3 percent of working Laredo residents commuted by driving alone, 10.2 percent carpooled, 0.9 percent used public transportation, and 1.9 percent walked. About 2 percent of working Laredo residents commuted by all other means, including taxi, bicycle, and motorcycles. About 2.6 percent worked at home.

In 2015, 6.5 percent of city of Laredo households were without a car, which decreased slightly to 5.9 percent in 2016. The national average was 8.7 percent in 2016. Laredo averaged 1.85 cars per household in 2016, compared to a national average of 1.8 per household.

==== Air ====
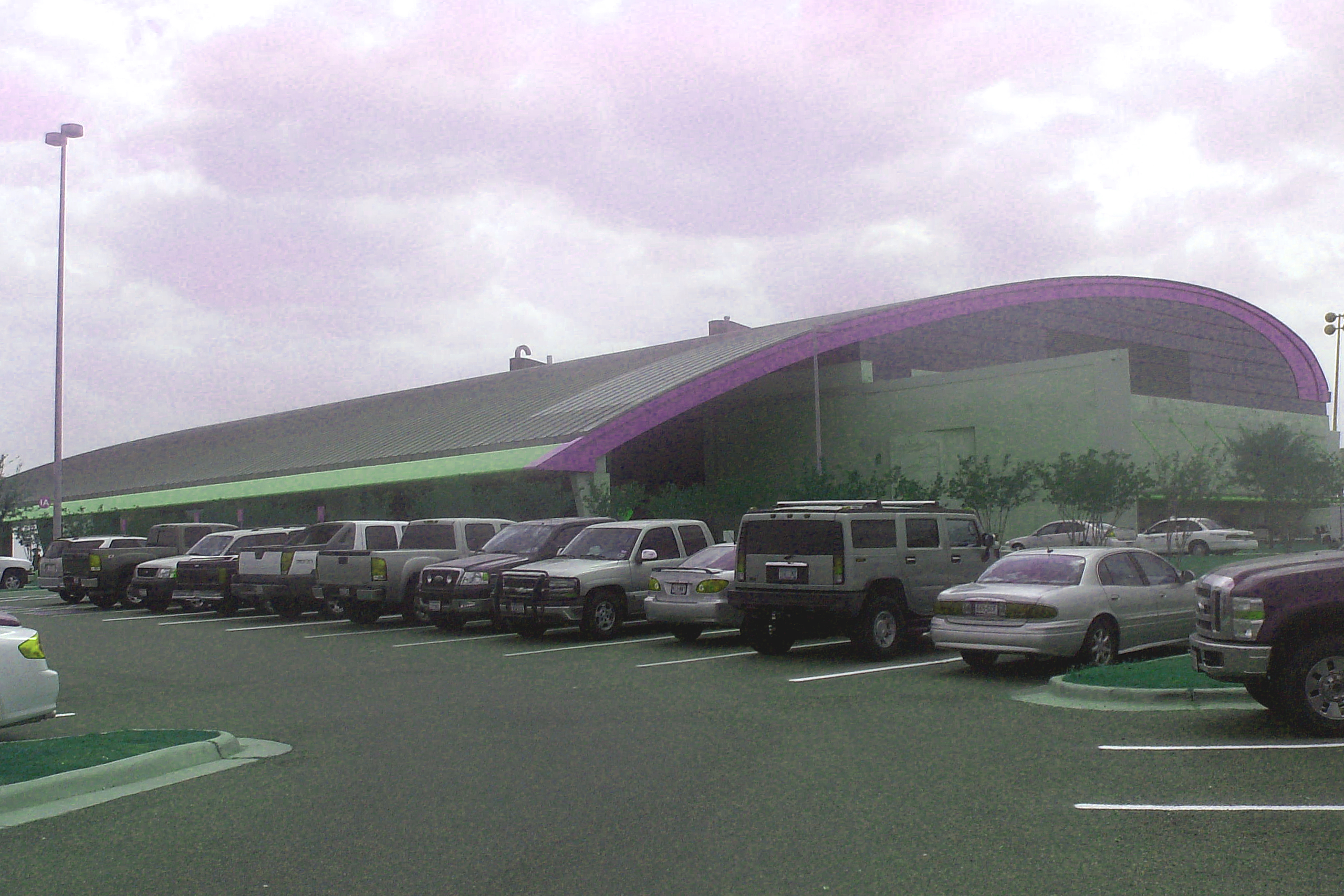
Laredo International Airport

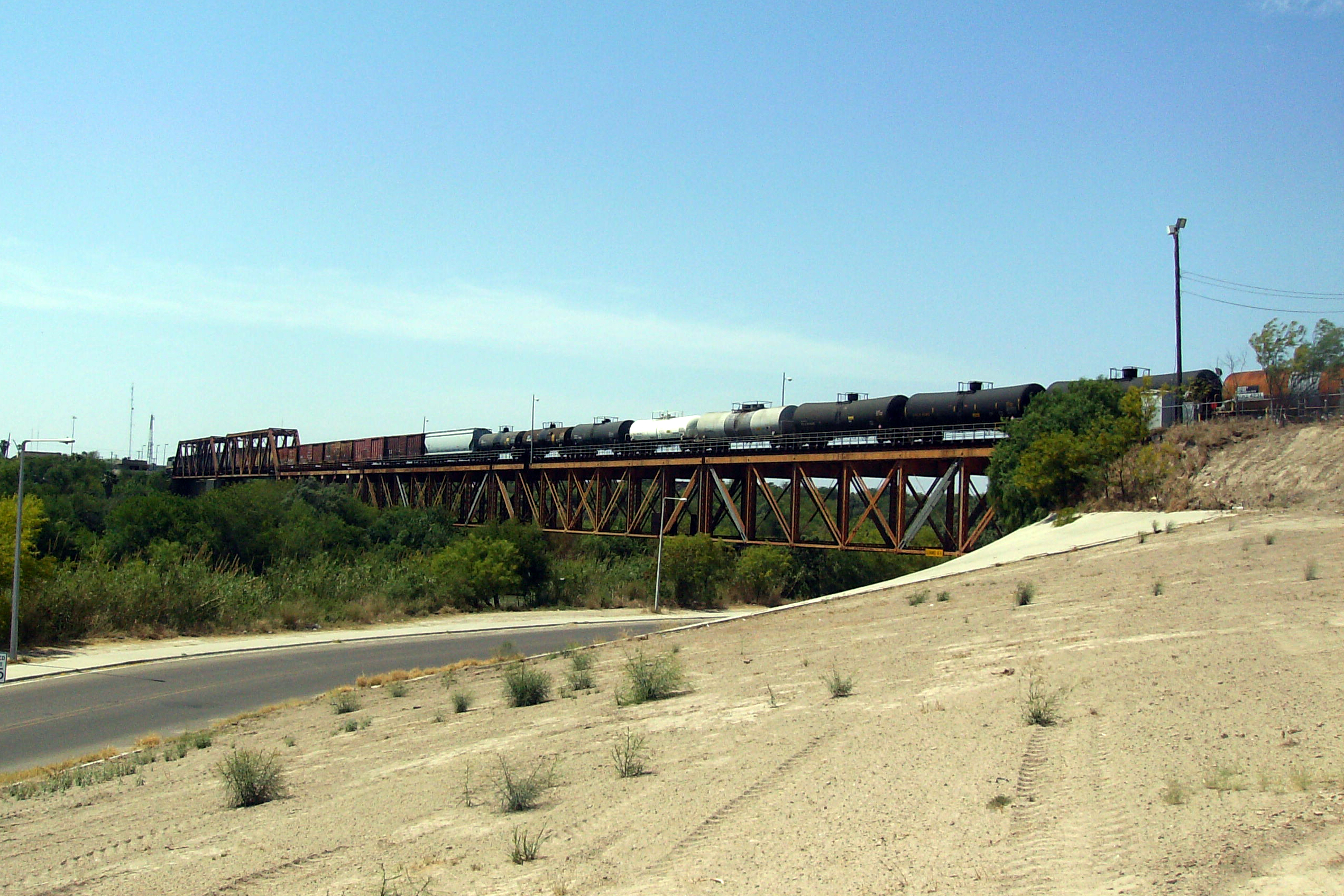
Tex-Mex Railway International Bridge view from Laredo

Laredo is served by the Laredo International Airport. Daily flights are available to Houston (George Bush Intercontinental Airport) and to Dallas/Fort Worth International Airport. Tri-weekly flights to Las Vegas, Nevada are available. After Laredo Air Force Base closed in the mid-1970s, the federal government handed over the old air force base and property to the City of Laredo for a new municipal airport. From the mid-1970s until the mid-1990s, the airport used a small terminal for passenger airline service and several old hangars for air cargo and private aircraft. A new state-of-the art passenger terminal was built along the then newly constructed Loop 20 to accommodate larger jets and to increase passenger air travel through Laredo. Expansion of air cargo facilities, taxiways and aprons, air cargo carriers such as DHL, FedEx, UPS, BAX, and others have responded by adding commercial air cargo jet services. Laredo also has two medical helipads, at Laredo Medical Center and Doctor's Hospital.

==== Mass transit ====
El Metro is the public transit system that operates in the city with 21 fixed routes and Paratransit services, with approximately 4.6 million passengers per year. El Metro works with a fleet of over 47 fixed route buses, 2 trolleys and 18 Paratransit/El Lift vans. The El Metro hub is in downtown Laredo at El Metro Transit Center. The center also houses Greyhound Lines and provides fee-based daily parking for downtown shoppers and workers.

==== Rural transit ====
Rural transportation is provided by the Webb County operated "El Aguila Rural Transportation" (the Eagle) bus services. El Aguila serves fixed daily routes from rural communities (Bruni, El Cenizo, Mirando City, Oilton, and Rio Bravo) to the downtown El Metro Transit Center.

==== Road bridges ====
Bridge	Bridge number	Location	Opened	Pedestrians	Non-commercial vehicles	Commercial vehicles
Gateway to the Americas International Bridge	1	San Agustin Historical District	1889/1954	Yes	Yes	No
Juárez–Lincoln International Bridge	2	Southern terminus of Interstate 35	1976	No	Yes	limited (e.g. buses)
Colombia-Solidarity International Bridge	3	Nuevo León, Mexico / Texas border	1992	Yes	Yes	Yes
World Trade International Bridge	4	Northern Terminus of Loop 20, Western terminus of Interstate 69W, Western terminus of U.S. Highway 59	2000	No	No	Yes

==== Rail bridges ====
Bridge	Bridge number	Location
Patrick J. Ottensmeyer International Railway Bridge (formerly known as the Texas-Mexican Railway International Bridge) (Laredo International Railway Bridge)	1	Downtown Laredo, Texas
Patrick J. Ottensmeyer International Railway Bridge (Right Next to Laredo International Railway Bridge 1) (Construction completed Feb. 2025)	2	Downtown Laredo, Texas

===== Proposed =====
Bridge	Bridge number	Location
Union Pacific International Railway Bridge project	3	Northwest Laredo area
Laredo-Colombia International Railway Bridge	4	Nuevo León / Texas border
Green Corridors "Elevated Guideway"	5	Nuevo León / Texas border

==== Highways ====
===== Major highways =====
====== Major highways in Laredo and their starting and ending points ======
- Interstate 35 Laredo—Duluth
- Interstate 69W Laredo—Victoria following I-69 to Port Huron
- Interstate 2 is proposed to be extended to Laredo following US 83 and the southern end of Loop 20. If it is extended, I-2's terminus would be I-69W.
- Interstate 27 is proposed to be extended to Laredo from Lubbock, Tx. following various routes till it meets with US 83. Once extended, I-27 will run concurrently with I-35 starting at mile marker 18 in north Webb County.
- U.S. Highway 59 Laredo—Lancaster. Included on the I-69W corridor.
- U.S. Highway 83 Brownsville—Laredo—Westhope
- State Highway 84 Laredo: FM1472—I-35
- State Highway 255 Laredo—Laredo–Colombia Solidarity International Bridge
- State Highway 359 Laredo—Skidmore
- State Loop 20 Loop around Laredo

====== Major highways in Nuevo Laredo and their starting and ending points ======
- Mexican Federal Highway 85 Nuevo Laredo-Mexico City
- Mexican Federal Highway 2 Matamoros-Nuevo Laredo-Colombia-Ciudad Acuña
- Tamaulipas State Highway 1 Nuevo Laredo-Monterrey
- Nuevo León State Highway Spur 1 Colombia-Anáhuac

===== Minor highways =====
- Farm to Market Road 1472(Mines Road) Laredo—Colombia Solidarity International Bridge
- Farm to Market Road 3338(Las Tiendas Road) Laredo: FM1472—SH255
- State Highway Spur 400(Clark Boulevard) Laredo: Arkansas Avenue—Loop 20
- State Highway Spur 260(Jaime Zapata Memorial Highway) Laredo: US83—SH359/Loop 20
- State Highway Spur 259 Laredo: SH359—Loop 20

== Notable people ==
=== Born in Laredo ===
- Pedro "Pete" Astudillo, composer
- David Barkley-Cantu, first Mexican-American to be awarded the Medal of Honor
- Freddie Benavides, former professional baseball player
- Santos Benavides, Confederate States of America colonel
- Esther Buckley (1948–2013), member of the United States Commission on Civil Rights from 1983 to 1992; Laredo educator
- Kaleb Canales (born 1978), assistant coach of the Indiana Pacers of the National Basketball Association
- Quico Canseco, Republican U.S. Representative representing Texas's 23rd congressional district from 2010 to 2012
- Orlando Canizales, professional boxer, Career W 50 L 5 D 1
- Francisco G. Cigarroa, chancellor of University of Texas System
- Henry Cuellar, Democrat U.S. Representative from Texas's 28th congressional district since 2005, former Texas Secretary of State (2001) and state representative (1987–2001)
- Tony Dalton, actor and screenwriter
- Elizabeth De Razzo (born 1980), actress
- Tom DeLay, former U.S. Representative for Texas's 22nd congressional district, former House Majority Leader, Republican from Sugar Land, Texas
- Ramón H. Dovalina (born 1943), educator; president of Laredo Community College from 1995 to 2007
- Elma Salinas Ender (born 1953), first Hispanic woman state court judge in Texas; served on the 341st District Court from 1983 until her retirement in 2012
- Audrey Esparza (born 1986), actress
- Megan Frazee (born 1987), women's professional basketball player, (2009–)
- Betty Flores (born 1944), first woman mayor of Laredo, 1998–2006
- Alfonso Gomez-Rejon (born 1973), film and television director
- Roxanne Perez (born 2001), professional wrestler in WWE
- Raquel Rodriguez (born 1991), professional wrestler in WWE (resided in Laredo)
- Armando Hinojosa (born 1944), sculptor, designed Tejano Monument in Austin and "Among Friends There Are No Borders" at the Laredo International Airport
- Jovita Idar (1885–1946), was a Mexican-American journalist, political activist and civil rights worker, who fought for the rights of Mexican Americans and women
- John King, Professional baseball pitcher for The Texas Rangers
- Rodney Lewis (born 1954), oil and natural gas industrialist based in San Antonio
- Sebastián Ligarde (born 1954), actor
- Paul Magnier (born 2004), professional French cyclist
- Thomas C. Mann (1912–1999), Pointman for Latin America policy for President Lyndon Johnson.
- Jose C. "Pepe" Martin Jr. (1913–1998), mayor of Laredo from 1954 to 1978; convicted federal felon popularly known as el patron
- César A. Martínez (born 1944), artist, prominent in the Chicano world of art
- Carlos Mercado (born 1999), soccer player
- Alicia Dickerson Montemayor, Democratic political activist and educator
- Amado Maurilio Peña Jr. (born 1943), American visual artist and art educator
- Federico Peña, former mayor of Denver, former U.S. Secretary of Transportation, and former U.S. Secretary of Energy, Democrat
- William Merriweather Peña (1919–2018), architect
- Roel Ramírez (born 1995), professional baseball player
- Ana Rodriguez, Miss USA finalist, finished third runner up, 2011
- Johnny Rodriguez, Tex-Mex Country singer
- Pete Saenz (born 1951), mayor of Laredo since November 12, 2014; former trustee of Laredo Community College and Laredo lawyer
- Poncho Sanchez (born 1951), conga player, Latin jazz bandmaster & salsa singer
- Antonio R. "Tony" Sanchez Jr., oilman and banker, 2002 Democratic nominee for governor of Texas
- Edgar Valdez Villarreal (born 1973), nicknamed La Barbie, Mexican-American drug lord and former leader of Los Negros
- Kathleen King von Alvensleben, architect
- Peggy Webber (1925–2026), actress
- Jack Wheeler (1944–2010), co-founder of the Vietnam Veterans Memorial Fund; aide to U.S. Presidents Reagan, George H.W. Bush, and George W. Bush
- Judith Zaffirini (born 1946), First Latina elected to the Texas State Senate.

=== Other notable people ===
- Steve Asmussen (born 1965), horse breeder who won three legs of the Triple Crown
- Norma Elia Cantú (born 1947), Chicana postmodernist writer and a professor of English at the University of Texas at San Antonio
- Thomas Haden Church, actor in film Sideways and sitcom Wings
- Edmund J. Davis (1827–1883), governor of Texas from 1869 to 1873; resided in Laredo during parts of the 1850s
- Ned Kock, information systems professor affiliated with Texas A&M International University
- Jack Lanza, ex-professional wrestler, now WWE producer
- Juan L. Maldonado (born 1948), sixth president of Laredo Community College
- Saul N. Ramirez Jr., mayor of Laredo from 1990 to 1998
- Richard Peña Raymond, state representative from Webb County since 2001; previously represented Duval County
- Jerry D. Thompson (born 1943), historian affiliated with Texas A&M International University
- Jeremy Vuolo, (born 1987), is an American former soccer player for Major League Soccer and the North American Soccer League.
- Robert G. Whitehead (1916–2007), businessman/artist who marketed "Blue Star" first-aid ointment
- Roger L. Worsley (born 1937), president of Laredo Community College, 1985 to 1995

== Sister cities ==
During the month of July, Laredo sponsors the Laredo International Sister Cities Festival, which was founded in 2003. The festival is an international business, trade, tourism, and cultural expo. All of Laredo's sister cities are invited to participate. In 2004, the Laredo International Sister Cities Festival received the best overall Program award from the Sister Cities International.

Laredo's sister cities are:

- Acámbaro, Mexico (2004)
- Campeche, Mexico
- Cerralvo, Mexico
- Chenzhou, China (2001)
- Ciénega de Flores, Mexico (1987)
- Ciudad Valles, Mexico
- La Cruz, Costa Rica
- Cuernavaca, Mexico
- General Escobedo, Mexico
- General Terán, Mexico
- Guadalajara, Mexico
- Guadalupe, Mexico (2000)
- Los Herreras, Mexico
- Hutt, New Zealand
- Jerez, Mexico (1987)
- Lampazos de Naranjo, Mexico (2000)
- Laredo, Spain (1978)
- Lázaro Cárdenas, Mexico
- León, Mexico
- Mexticacán, Mexico (2002)
- Monclova, Mexico (2003)
- Montemorelos, Mexico
- Murray Bridge, Australia (1984)
- Nuevo Laredo, Mexico (1986)
- Papantla, Mexico
- San Antonio de Areco, Argentina
- San Miguel de Allende, Mexico (2001)
- Tainan, Taiwan
- Tepatitlán de Morelos, Mexico
- Tijuana, Mexico
- Tlahualilo, Mexico (1988)
- Tonalá, Mexico
- Torreón, Mexico 2004)
- Veracruz, Mexico (1992)
- Wenzhou, China
- Wuwei, China (2004)
- Zixing, China (2002)

== See also ==
- Laredo–Nuevo Laredo
- Nuevo Laredo
- Webb County, Texas
