= Republic of the Rio Grande Museum =

- Capital of the Republic of the Rio Grande
- U.S. Historic district – Contributing property
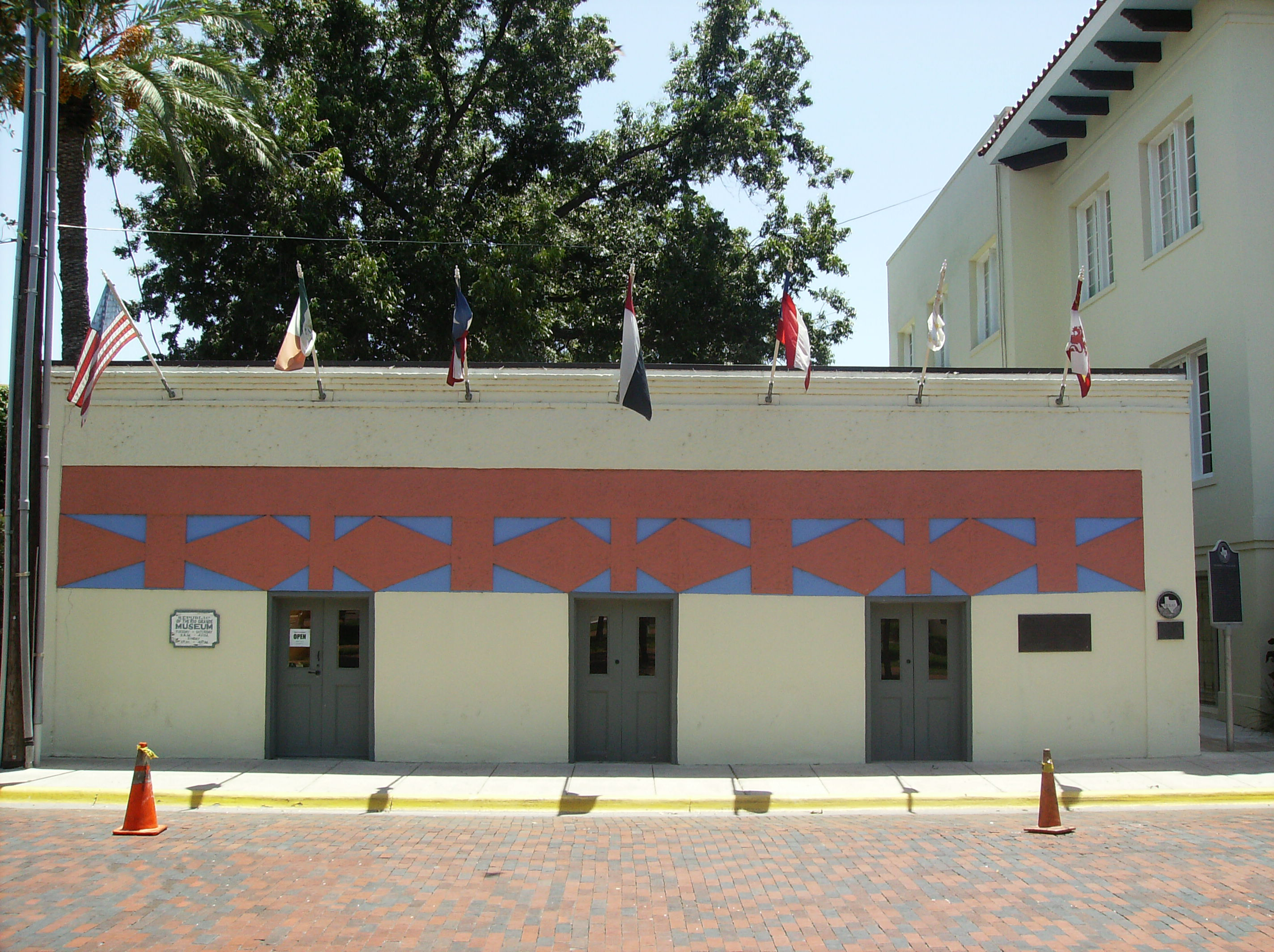
- Part of the Republic of the Rio Grande Capitol Building is today a museum

- Location within Texas Location within the United States
- Location: 1001 Zaragoza St., Laredo, Texas
- Coordinates: 27°30′06″N 99°30′22″W
- Part of: San Agustin de Laredo Historic District (ID73001983)
- Added to NRHP: September 19, 1973

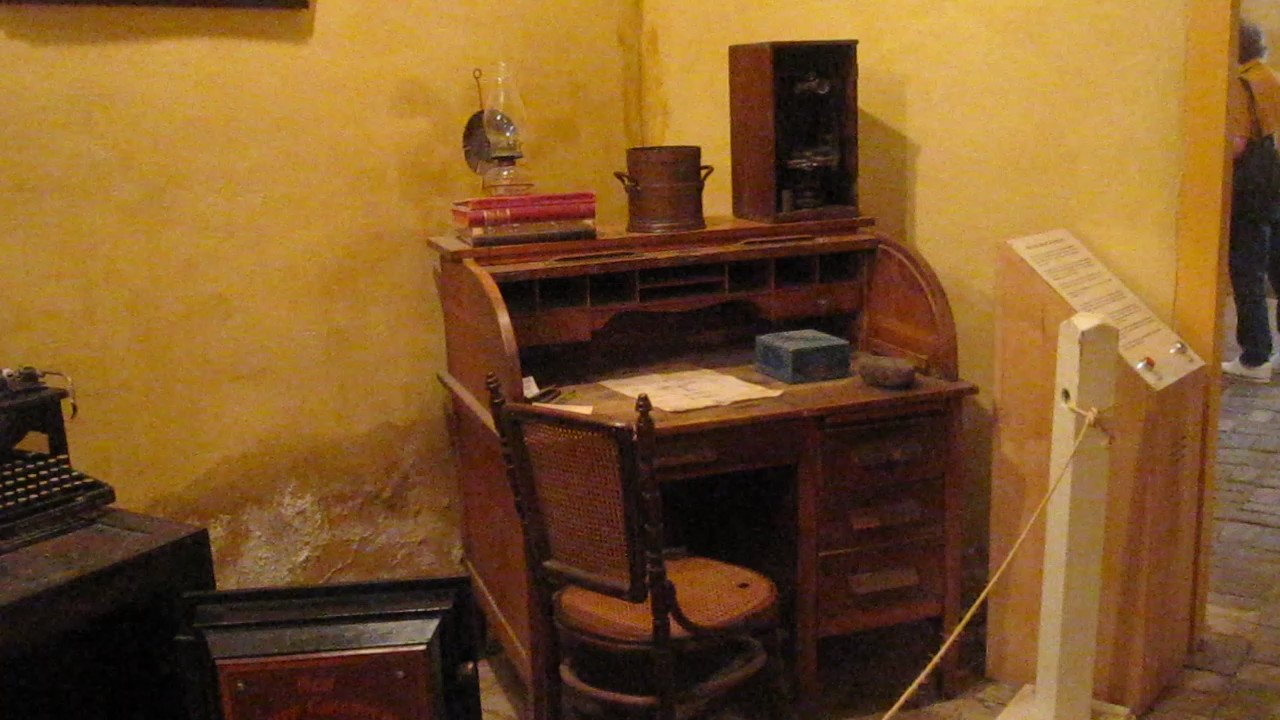
Hacienda office at the Republic of the Rio Grande Capitol Building Museum

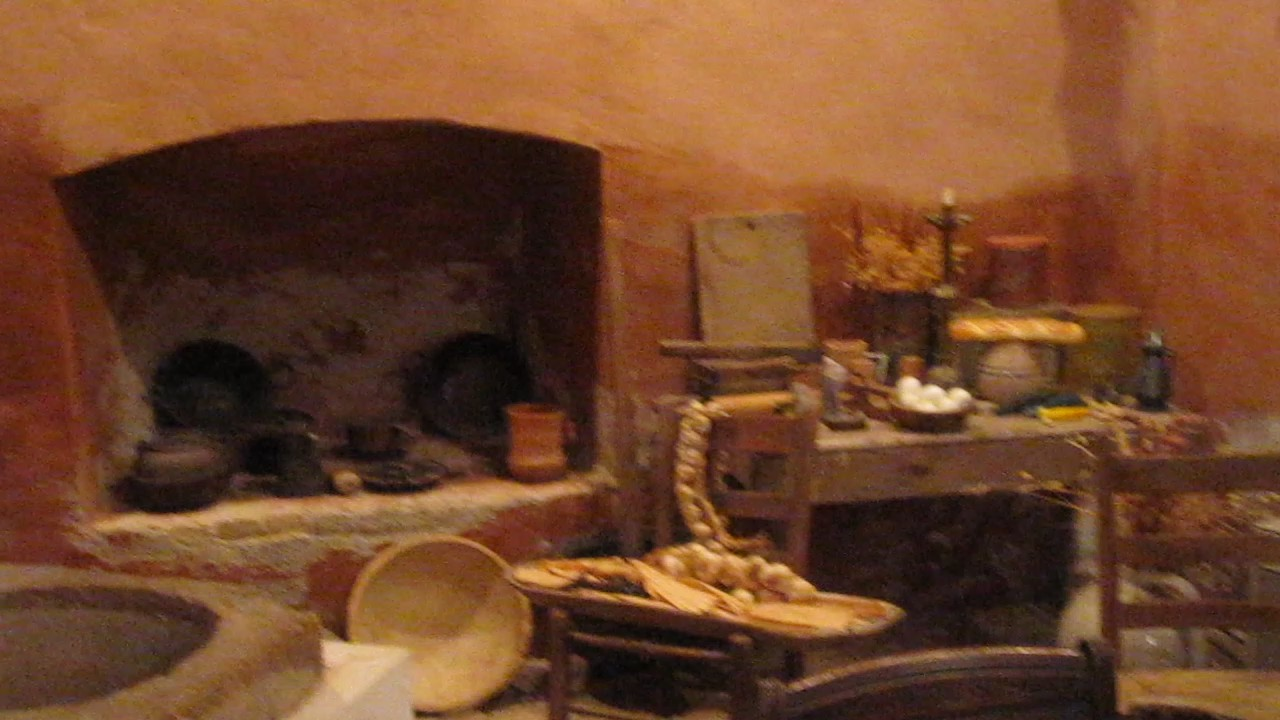
Kitchen of a period hacienda

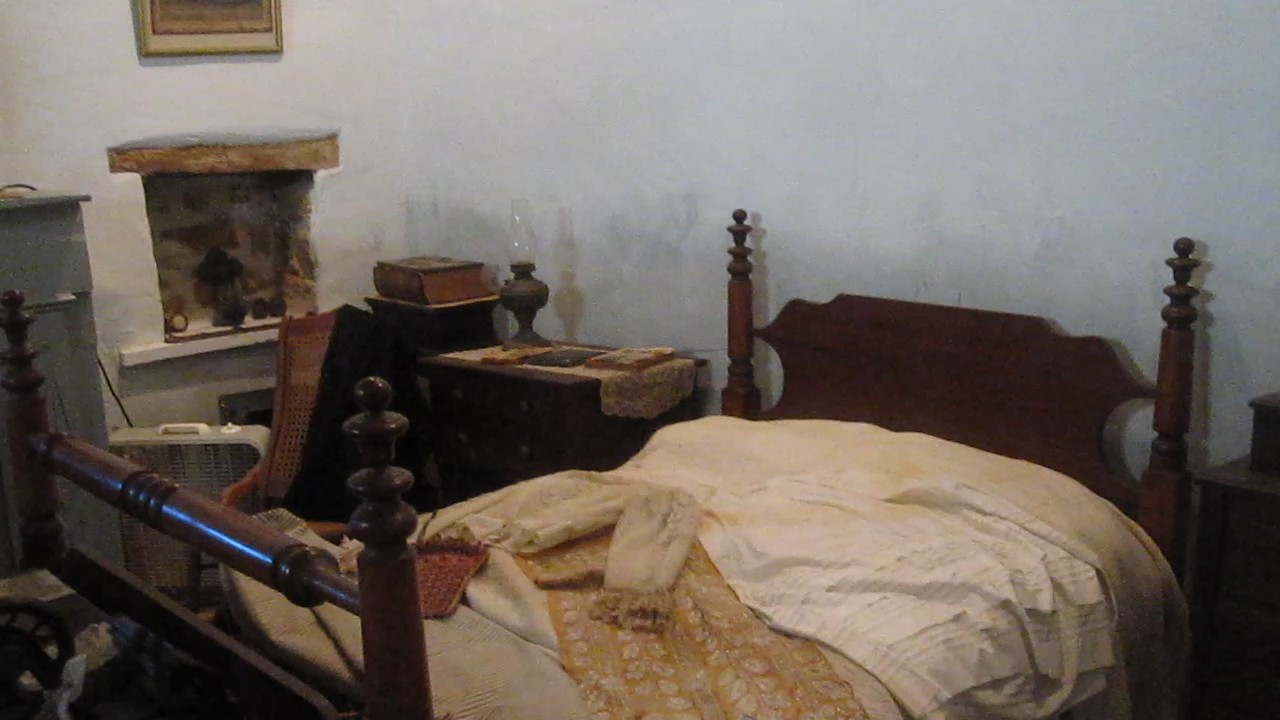
Hacienda bedroom

Republic of the Rio Grande Museum is a historic house museum located in the downtown San Agustin de Laredo Historic District in Laredo, Texas, United States, next to the historic La Posada Hotel and San Agustín Cathedral. The Mexican vernacular structure was built in 1830 as a house with an addition in 1860. Among the people who have lived there was prominent rancher Bartolomé García, who was also one of Laredo's mayors, and who is a descendant of the town founder, Tomas Sanchez.

Once the Republic of the Rio Grande capitol building, it now showcases memorabilia from the short-lived Republic of the Rio Grande and displays pictures, books, and furniture from the 19th century Laredo area. There are three restored rooms re-creating an authentic 1830 home in Laredo; an office and sitting area, a bedroom, and a kitchen. Because of this Republic, Laredo had flown seven flags instead of the traditional Six flags over Texas.

The museum is operated by the Webb County Heritage Foundation, a non-profit 501 (c) (3) organization chartered in 1980 to promote historic preservation, education, and tourism. The museum offers guided tours for school age children and adults year-round.

== See also ==
- National Register of Historic Places listings in Webb County, Texas
- Recorded Texas Historic Landmarks in Webb County
