= Barrio Azteca Historic District =

- U.S. National Register of Historic Places
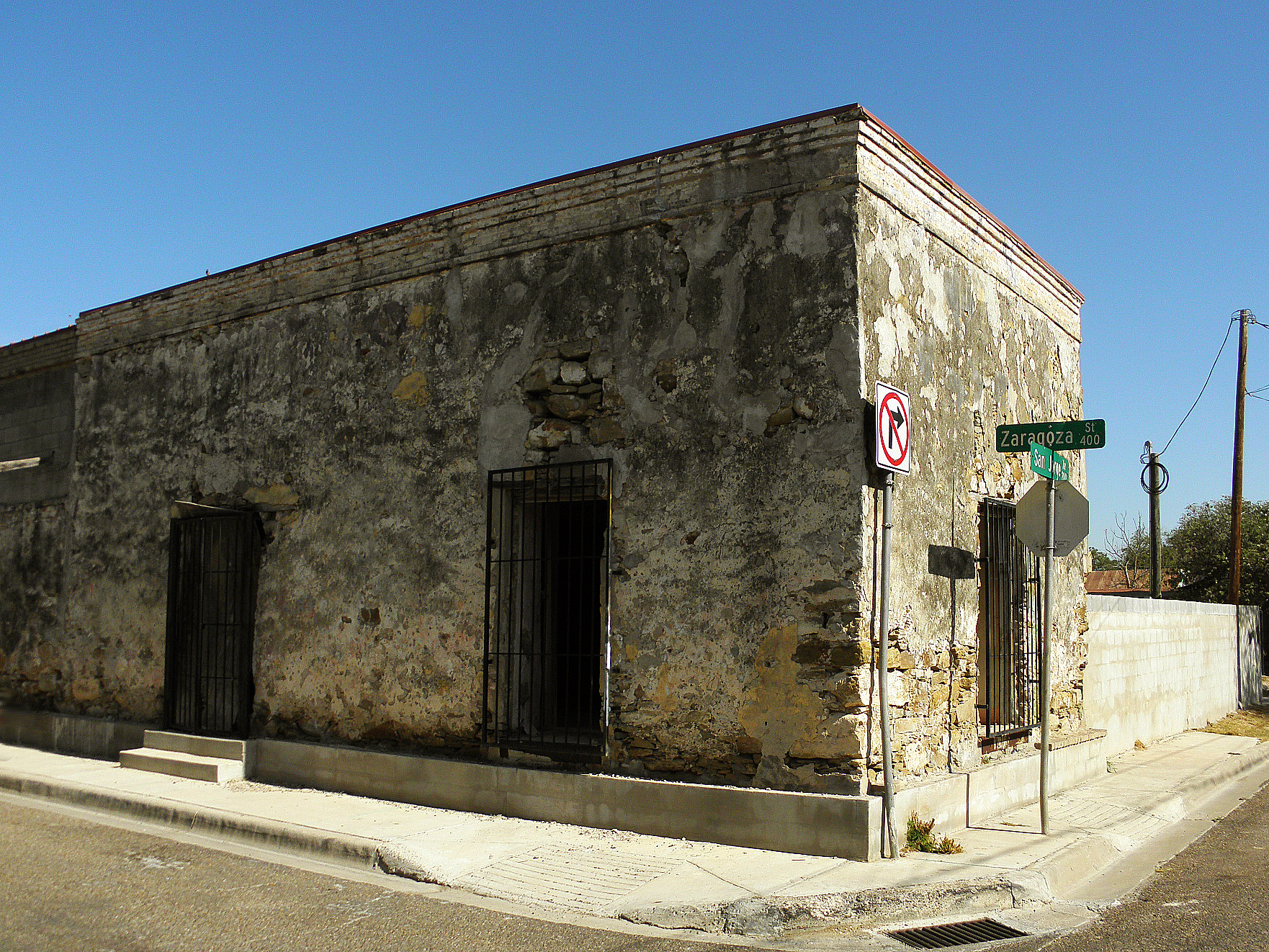
- Spanish Colonial House on Zaragoza Street

- Location within Texas Location within the United States
- Location: Roughly bounded by I-35, Matamoros St., Arroyo Zacate, and the Rio Grande, Laredo, Texas
- Coordinates: 27°30′9″N 99°29′54″W
- Area: 120 acres (49 ha)
- Architectural style: Mission, Spanish Revival
- NRHP reference No.: 03000431
- Added to NRHP: May 21, 2003

El Azteca is one of the oldest and most intact residential neighborhoods in Laredo, Texas, with buildings dating from the 1870s representing nearly every major architectural type and style that has appeared on the border since that time.

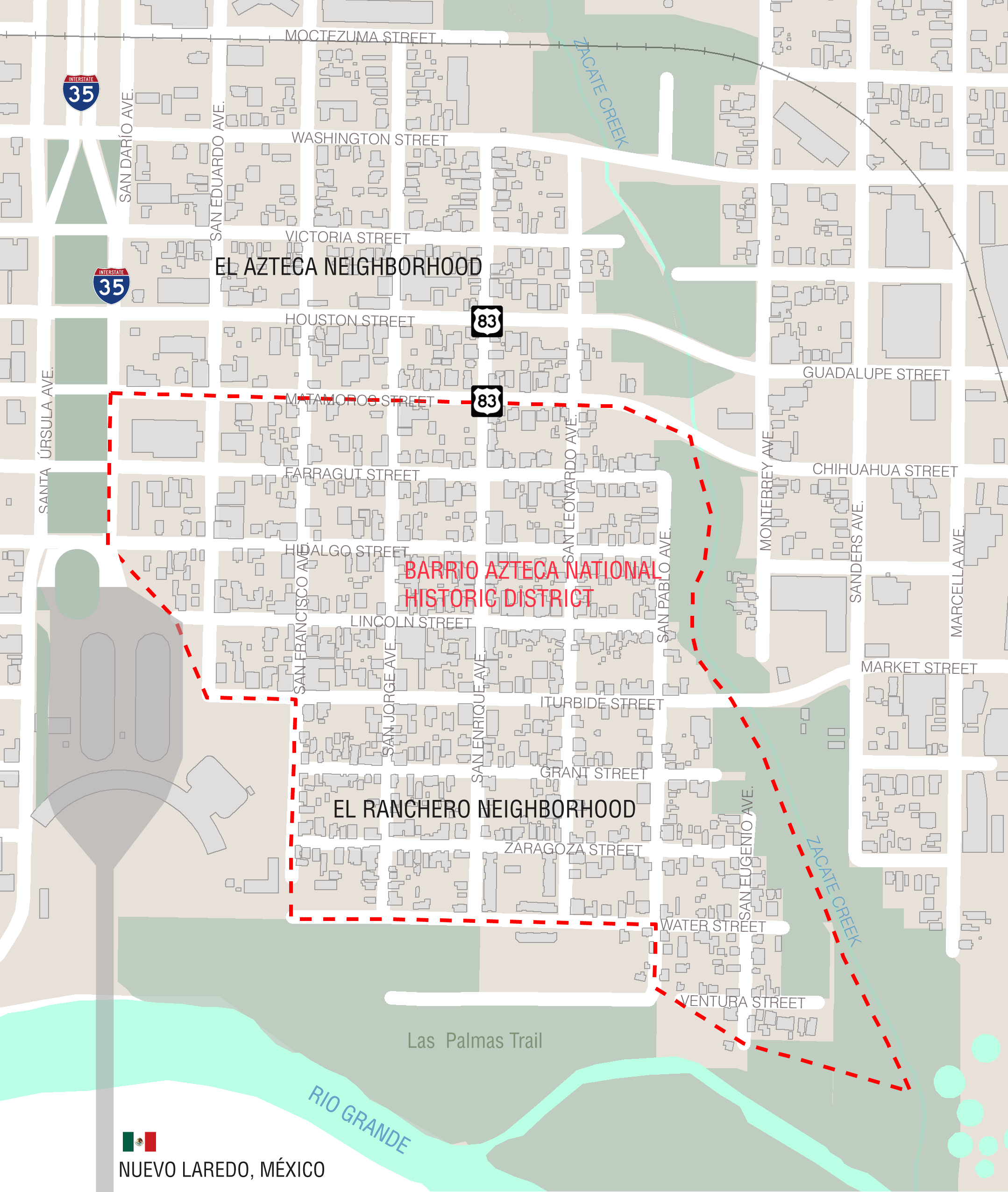
El Azteca Historic District Boundaries

== Location ==
Neighborhood east of Downtown Laredo, Roughly bounded by Interstate 35, Matamoros Street (U.S. Highway 83), Zacate Creek, and the Rio Grande.

== History ==
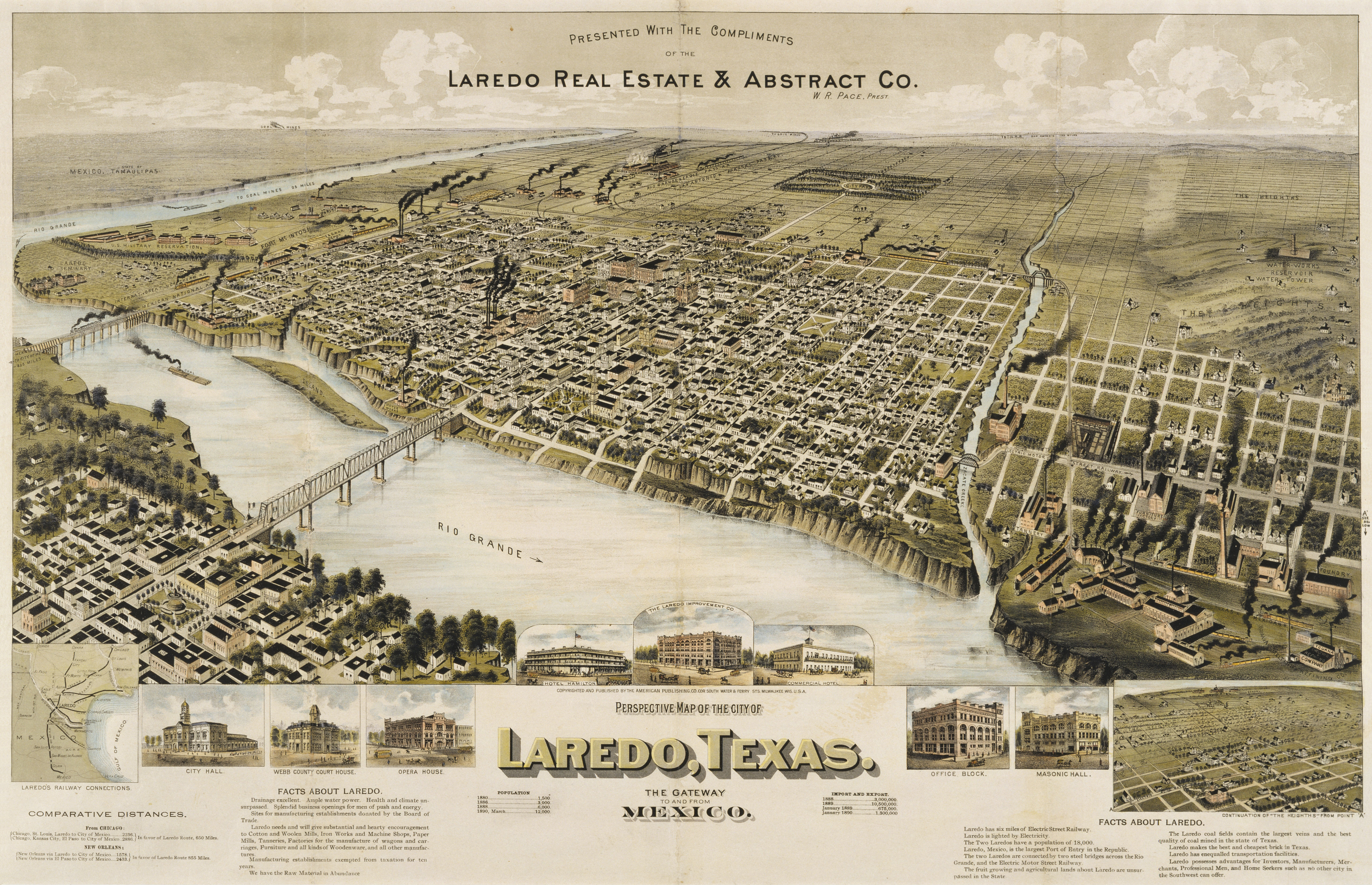
El Azteca Neighborhood developed east of today's San Agustin de Laredo Historic District.

El Azteca's earliest inhabitants were descendants of Spanish colonists who began settlement efforts along the lower Rio Grande in the mid-18th century. Later, immigrants from the Mexico contributed to the growth of the community and provided much of the labor for the newly arrived international railroad in 1881. By the turn of the 20th century, El Azteca was a thriving community of homes and small businesses populated almost exclusively by Mexican and Mexican-American residents.

El Azteca is significant as a diverse, multi-layered cultural landscape. The neighborhood took its name from El Azteca Theatre which opened in 1922 as the Teatro Nacional, a venue for theatrical and vaudeville performances. In the 1930s, when moving pictures supplanted live theater in popularity, it became known as El Azteca movie house and showed Spanish language films. A second theater, the Iturbide Theater, operated nearby and it was known as the “Home of Spanish Vaudeville.” The neighborhood was also the home of noted residents of Mexican origin who migrated escaping the Mexican Revolution.

== Recognition ==
Designated as a National Register Historic District in 2003, El Azteca is distinctive for its setting, layout and landscape features. The neighborhood is situated on a high bluff overlooking the Rio Grande which not only forms its southern boundary, but designates the international boundary between the United States and Mexico. Zacate Creek, a steep-walled creek that, in earlier times, provided fresh water to its inhabitants and livestock, defines its eastern boundary. Zacate Creek was the site for one of the last battles of the Civil War, the Battle of Laredo, in 1865. The first electric streetcar line built west of the Mississippi River passed through the neighborhood and crossed Zacate Creek via the Iturbide Street Bridge. The bridge and streetcar connected both the neighborhood and city of Laredo to the newly developing commercial and residential sections of the city that began growing to the east of the creek.

Cut off from the historic center of Laredo by Interstate 35 in the late 1970s, Barrio Azteca has retained much of its historic fabric. The neighborhood maintains a sufficient concentration of historic properties, some of which are rare, even extraordinary, examples of domestic and commercial vernacular architecture found only in the borderlands region of South Texas.

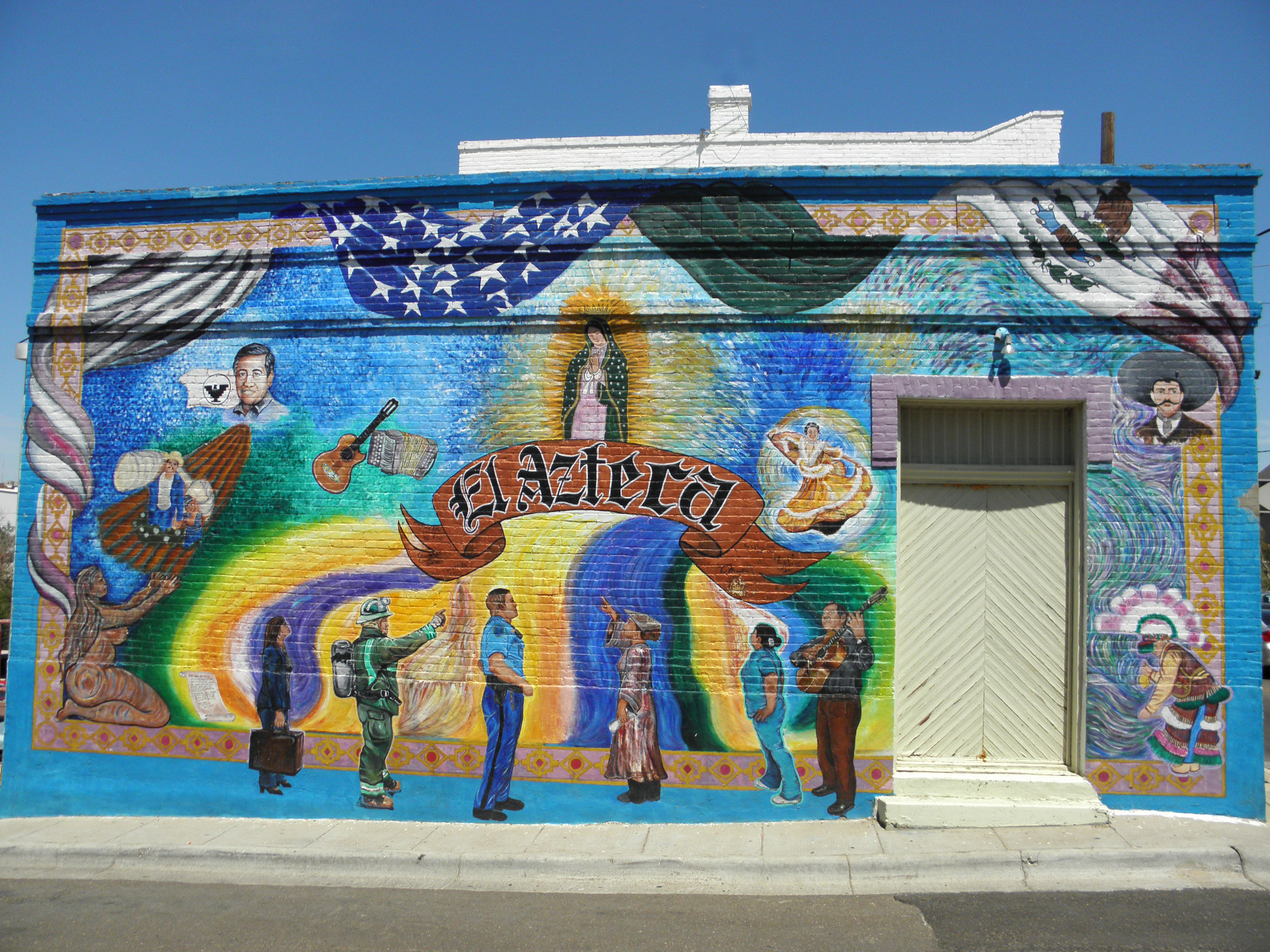
Mural on 20 Iturbide Street Building.

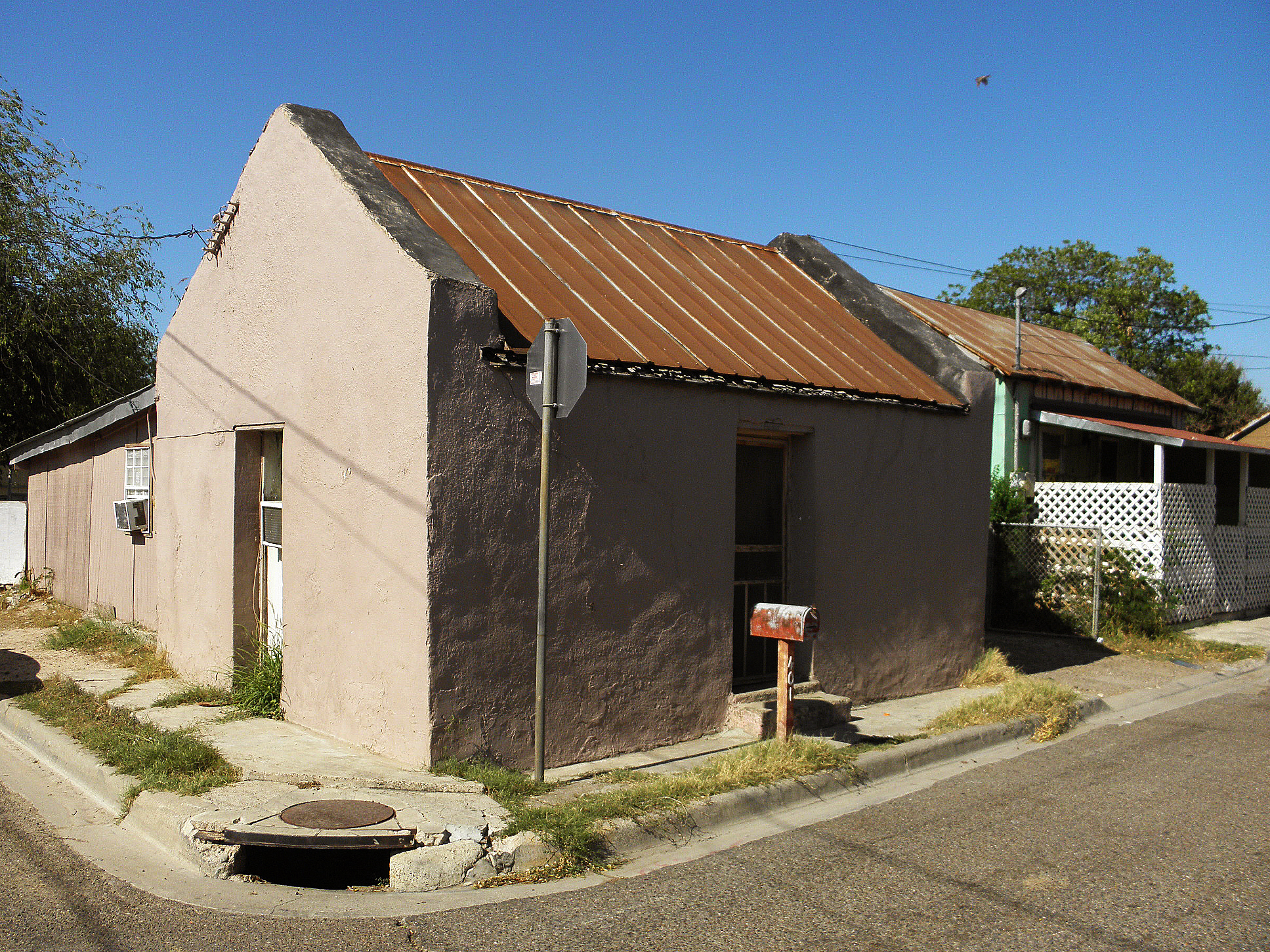
Sandstone building, one of the oldest structures in the neighborhood.

== See also ==
- Downtown Laredo
- National Register of Historic Places listings in Webb County, Texas
