= Downtown Laredo =

Coordinates: 27.509°N 99.511°W

- Interactive map of Downtown Laredo
- Country: United States
- State: Texas
- County: Webb County
- City: Laredo
- Elevation: 450 ft (140 m)
- ZIP codes: 78040, 78042
- Area code: 956

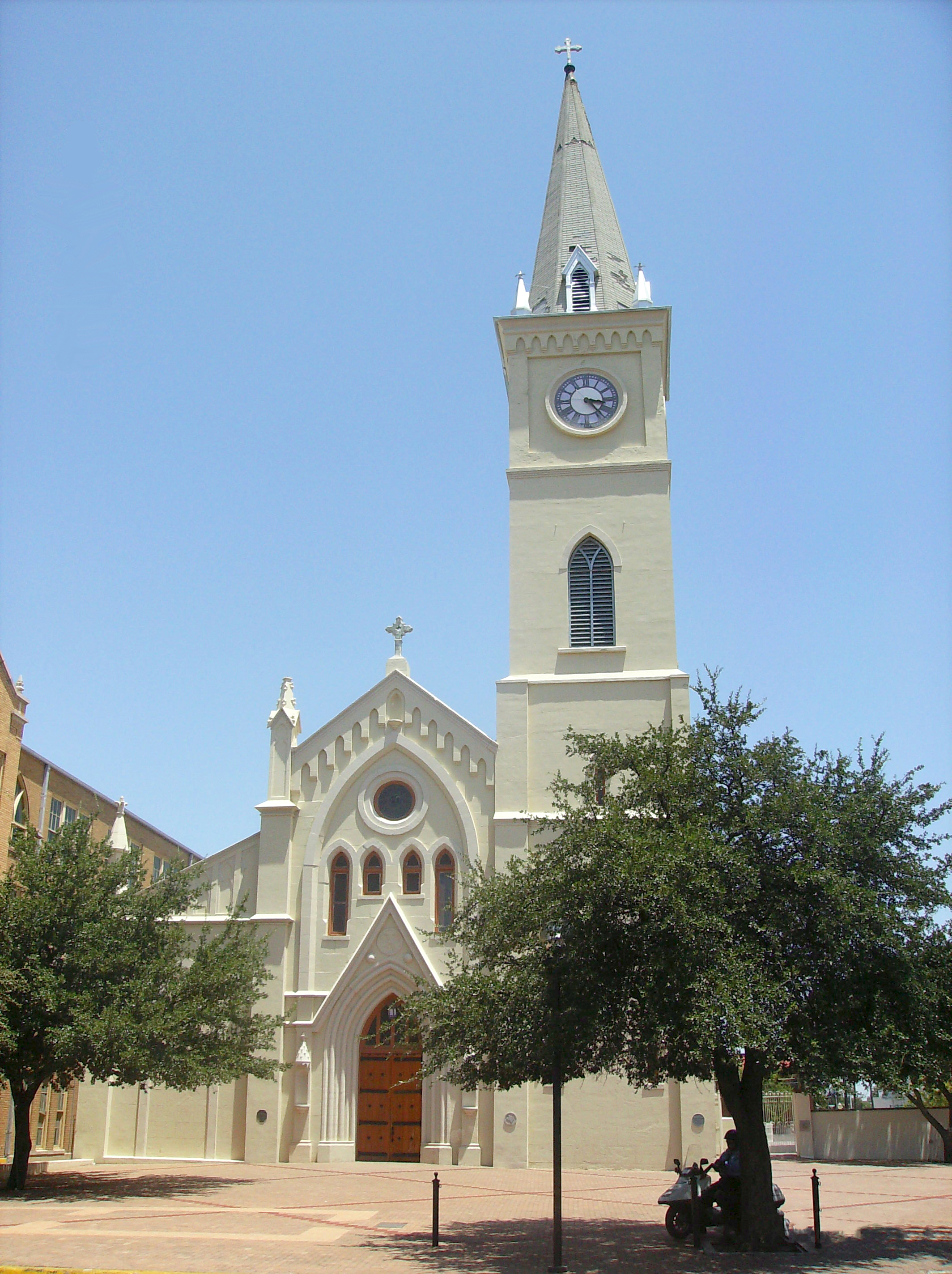
San Agustin Cathedral

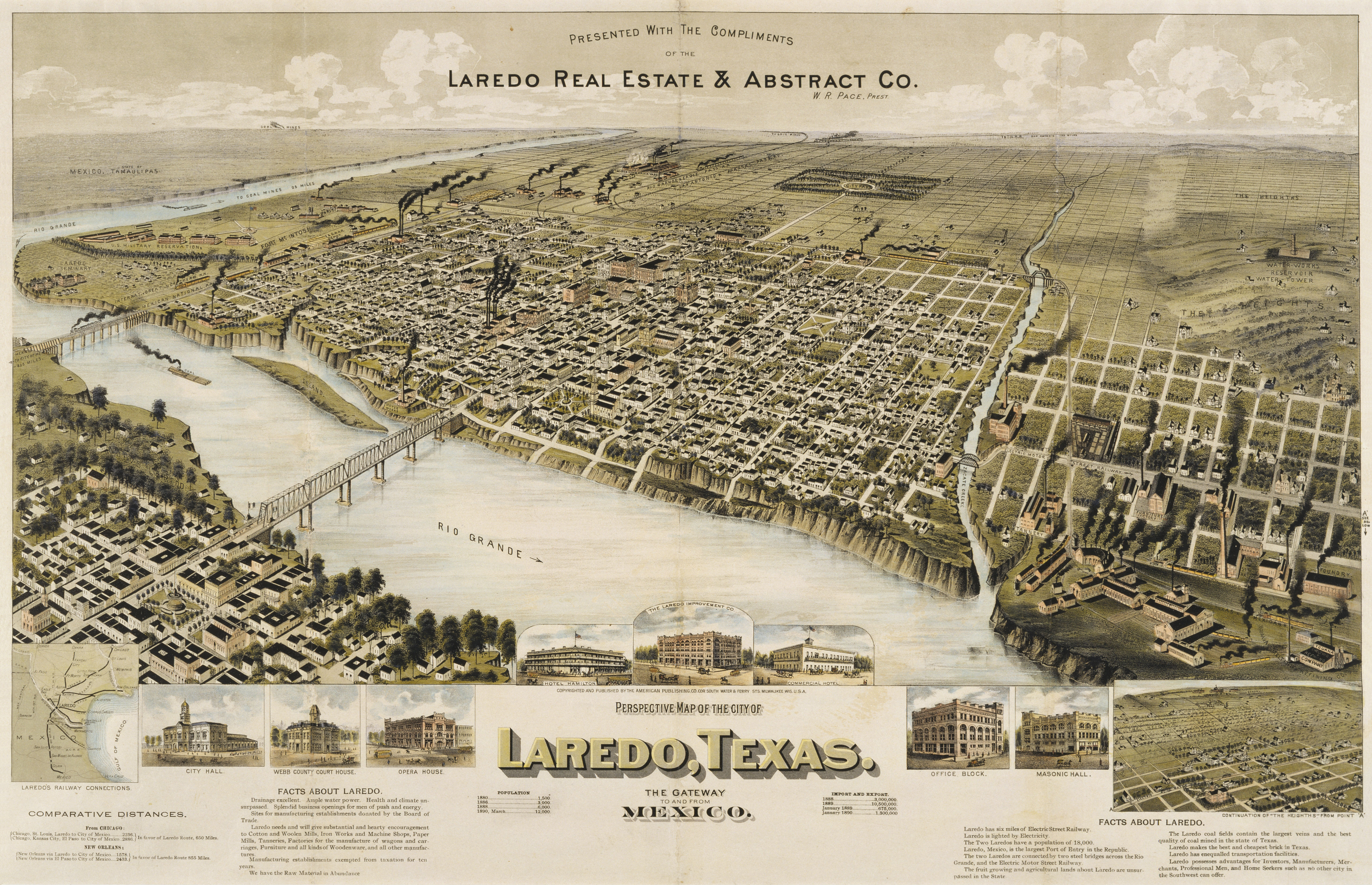
Map of Laredo in 1892, which now is Downtown Laredo

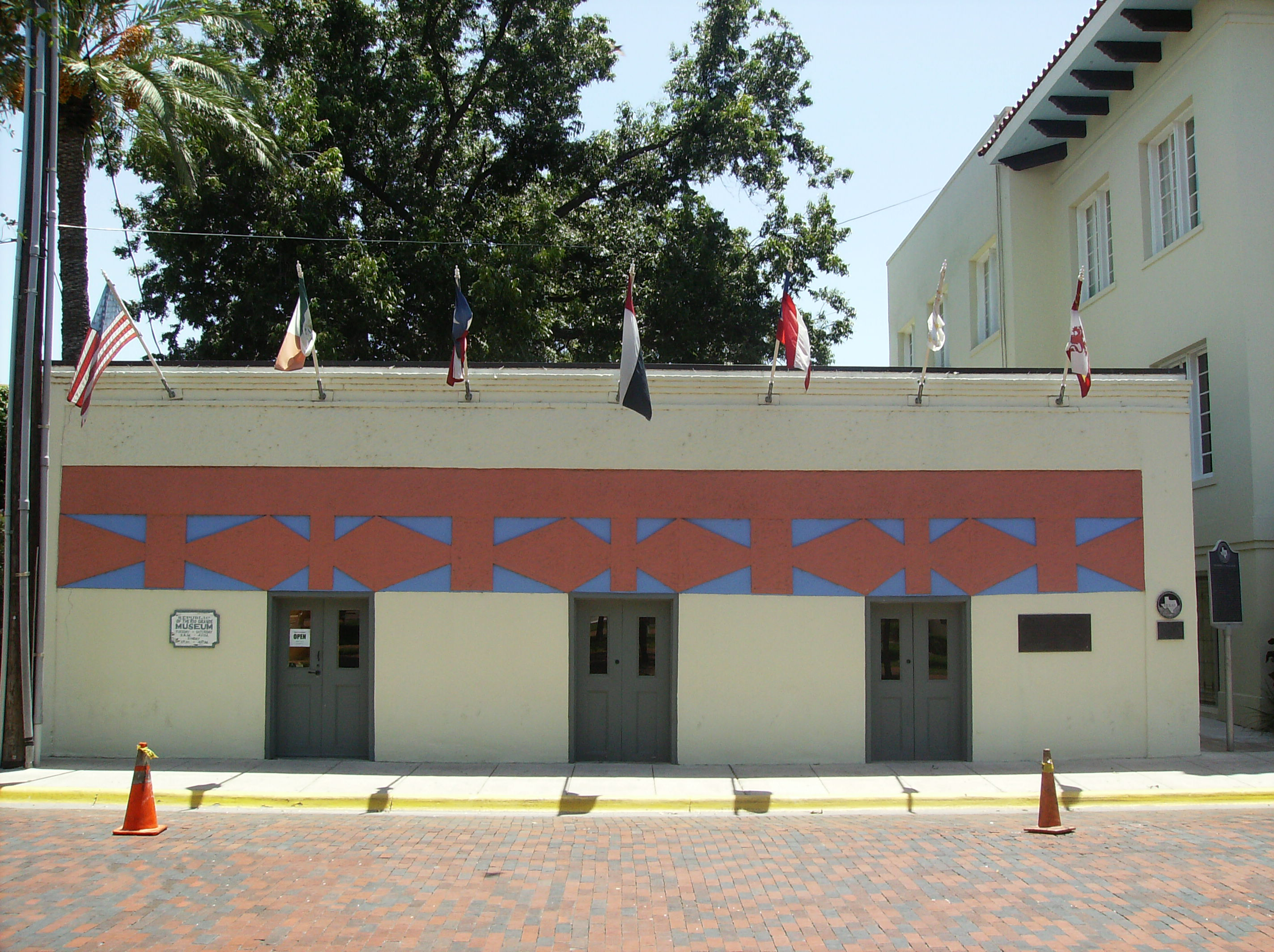
Republic of the Rio Grande Capitol building

Downtown Laredo is the second main business district in Laredo, Texas. Downtown Laredo is the starting point for Interstate Highway 35 and State Highway 359. It is home to all of Laredo's high-rise buildings. Laredo's and Webb County's main government buildings are located in Downtown Laredo. Most of Webb County's National Register of Historic Places are in this area.

== Location ==
Downtown Laredo is located in South Central Laredo, Texas at the terminus of Interstate Highway 35. On the opposite side of the Rio Grande, Downtown Nuevo Laredo is located. Downtown Laredo is roughly bounded by I-35 on the East, the Rio Grande on the South and West and Park Street in the North. This area was the original city of Laredo, founded in 1755 by Don Tomás Sanchez.

== Points of interest ==
Points of interest in Downtown Laredo are:

- Educational
  - Laredo Community College Fort McIntosh campus
- Financial
  - Laredo National Bank headquarters
  - International Bank of Commerce headquarters
- Historical according to the National Register of Historic Places
  - Barrio Azteca Historic District
  - Fort Mcintosh
  - Hamilton Hotel
  - Laredo Federal Building
  - Republic of the Rio Grande Museum
  - San Agustin Cathedral
  - San Agustin Historical District
  - Webb County Courthouse
- Retail
  - El Portal Center mall
  - Streets of Laredo Urban Mall
- Transportation
  - Gateway to the Americas International Bridge
  - Juarez-Lincoln International Bridge
- Other
  - Rio Grande

== Gallery ==
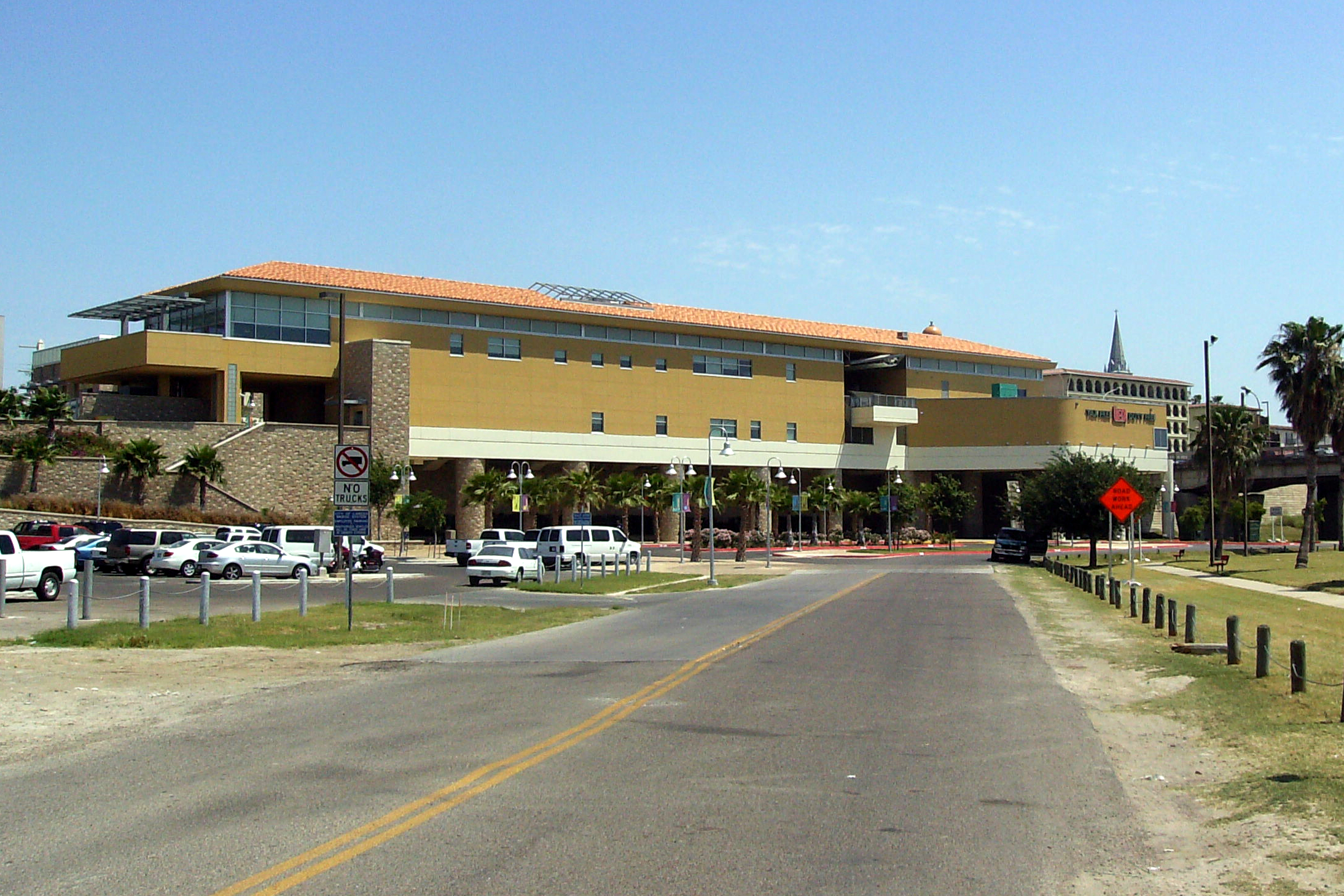
Duty-free zone

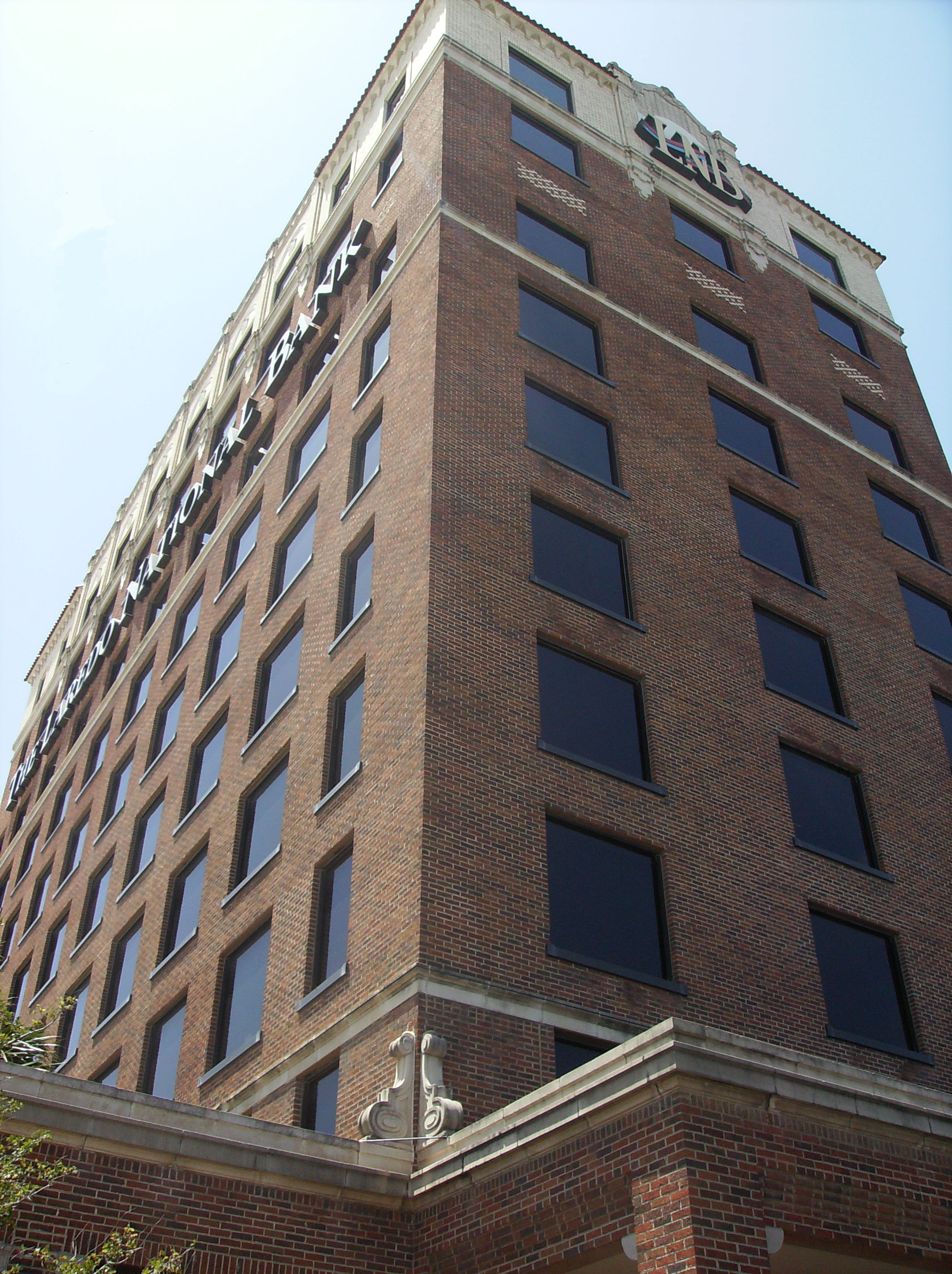
Laredo National Bank HQ

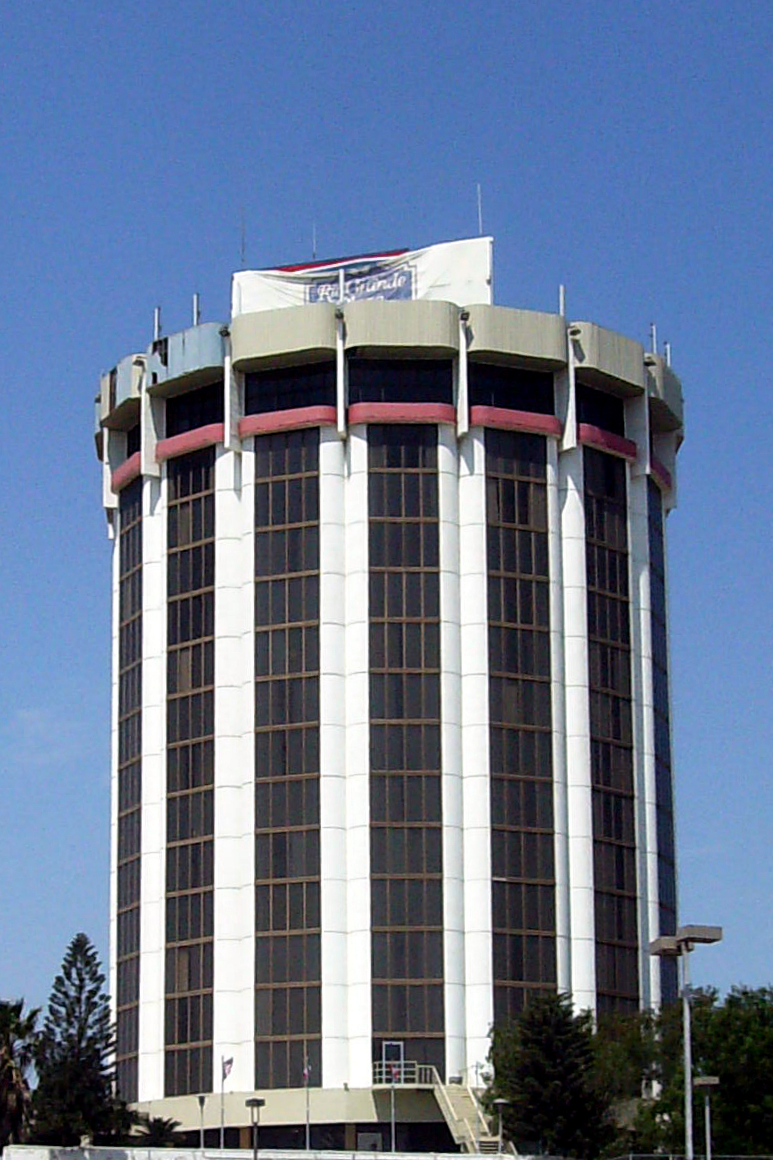
Rio grande Plaza Hotel

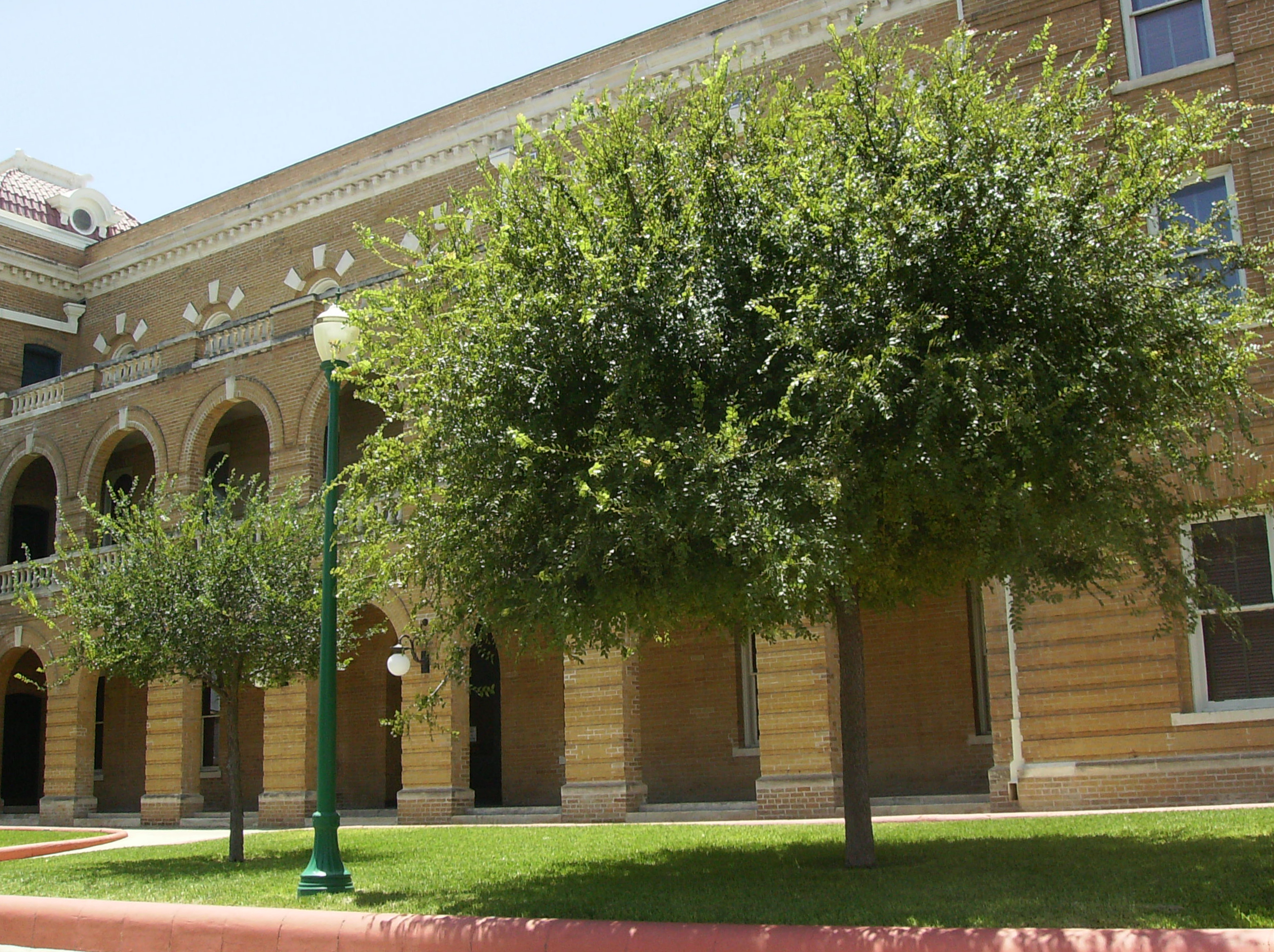
Webb County Courthouse

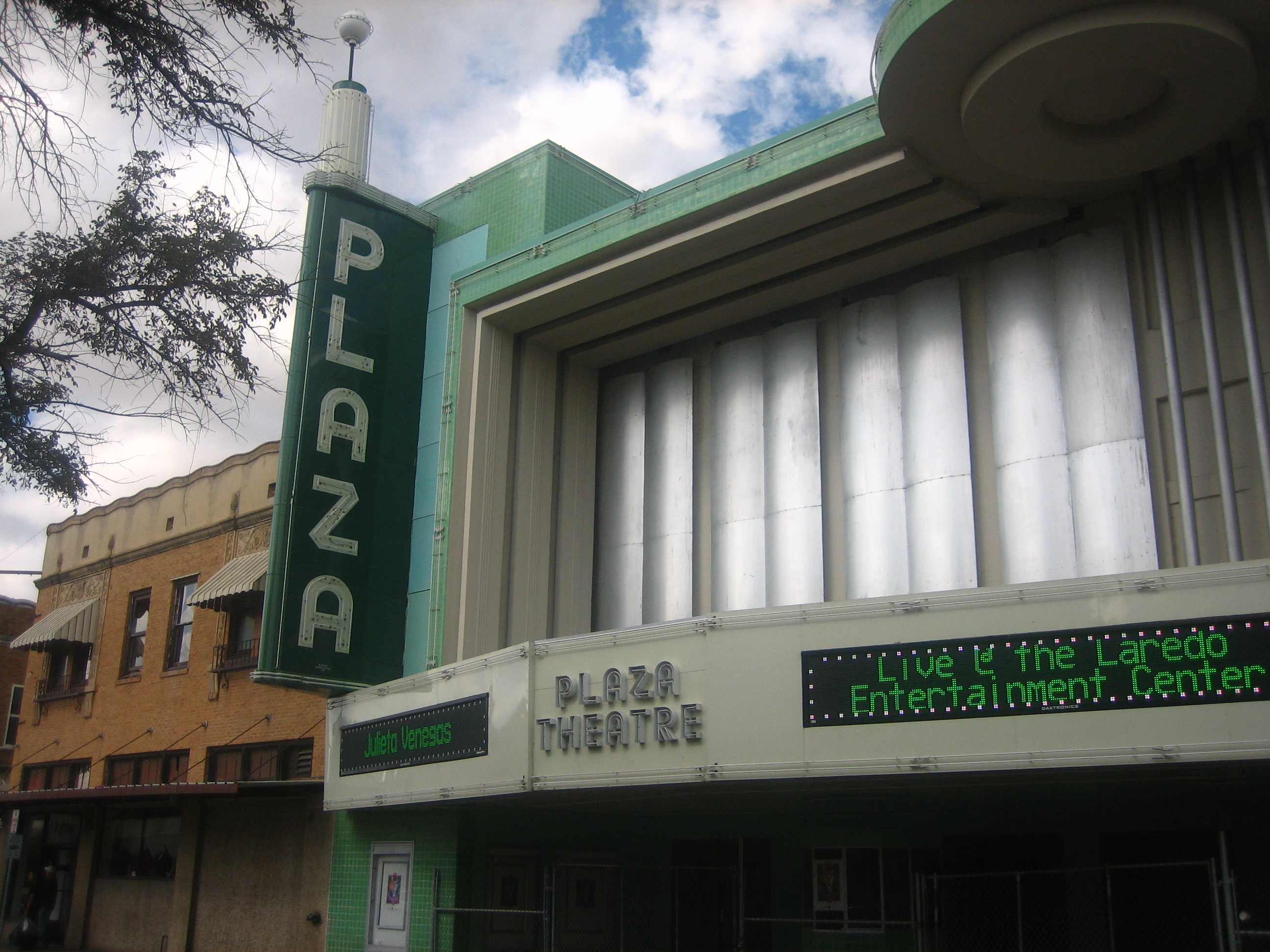
Former Plaza Theater in downtown Laredo
