= Zacate Creek =

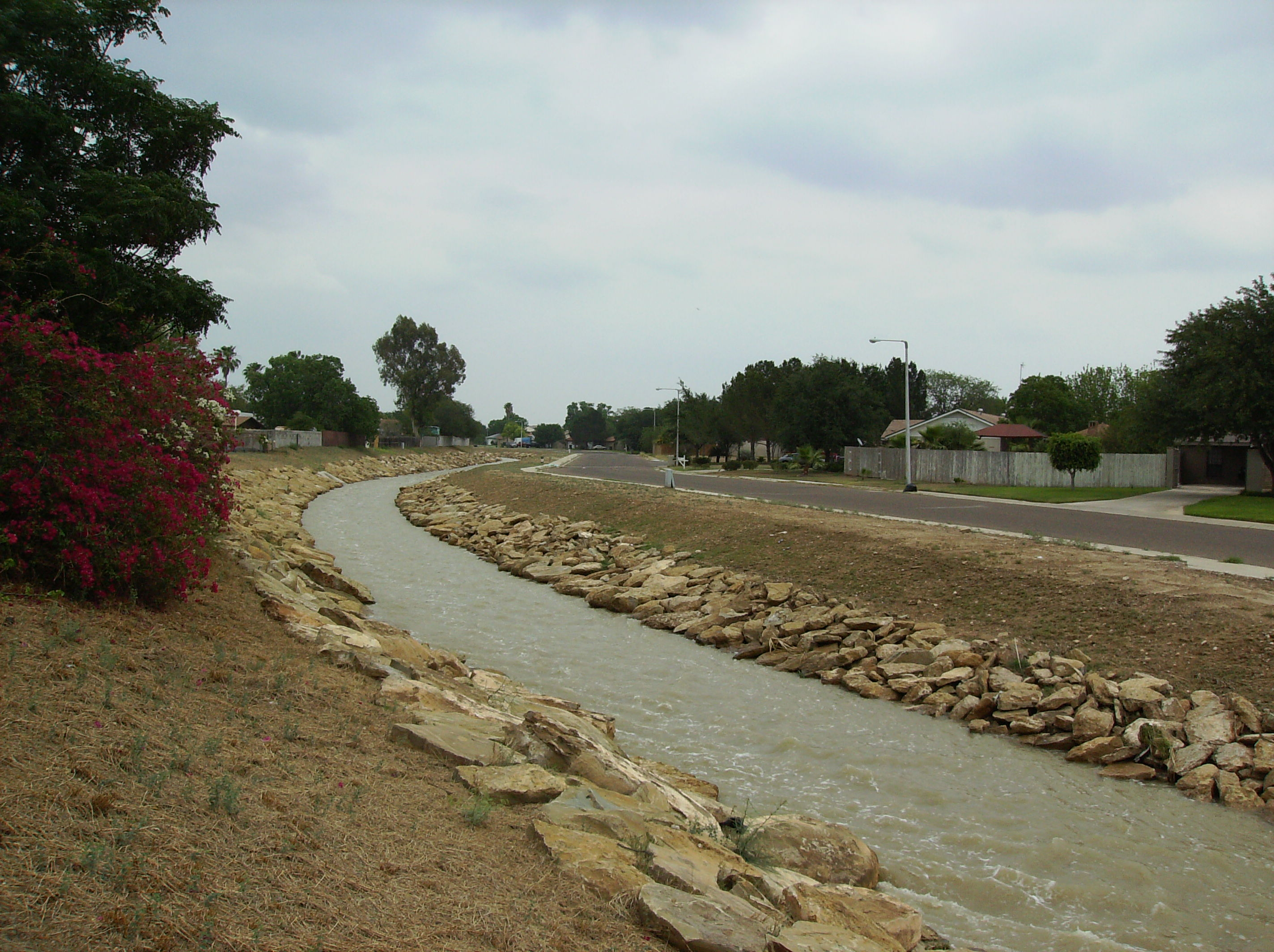
- A northern branch of Zacate Creek

Physical characteristics
- Source
  - location: Laredo, Texas
  - elevation: 423 ft (130 m)
- Mouth
  - location: Rio Grande at Laredo, Texas
  - elevation: 352 ft (110 m)
- Length: 10 mi (16 km)

Zacate Creek is inside Laredo, Texas city limits and runs southwest for 10 miles (16 km) until it connects to the Rio Grande. Zacate Creek has several ditches leading to it. The terrain surrounding the creek is mostly clay. The vegetation surrounding the creek is mostly made up of mesquite, cacti, and grasses. Zacate Creek and branches cross several highways in Laredo, Texas among them are: Interstate 35, Business United States Route 59, Texas State Highway Spur 400, Texas State Highway 359, and United States Route 83. The northern branch of the Zacate Creek has a small dam which formed a pond located in Northeast Laredo which is usually filled during storms. The city of Laredo has developed the Zacate Creek Park and the Zacate Creek Greenway, a three-mile (4.8 km) trail near the creek.

== Battle of Laredo ==
During the American Civil War, Laredo was a main route to export cotton to Mexico on behalf of the Confederate States. On March 18, 1864, Major Alfred Holt led a Union Army detachment of about 200 men from Brownsville, Texas to destroy 5,000 bales of cotton stacked at the San Agustín Plaza. Colonel Santos Benavides commanded 42 men and repelled three Union attacks at Zacate Creek in what is known as the Battle of Laredo.

== Coordinates ==
- Source: 27°32′22.85″N 99°30′00.07″W in Laredo, Texas
- Mouth: 27°29′56.05″N 99°29′39.50″W Rio Grande

== See also ==
- List of rivers of Texas
- List of tributaries of the Rio Grande
