= Laredo United States Post Office, Court House and Custom House =

- Laredo US Post Office, Court House and Custom House
- U.S. National Register of Historic Places
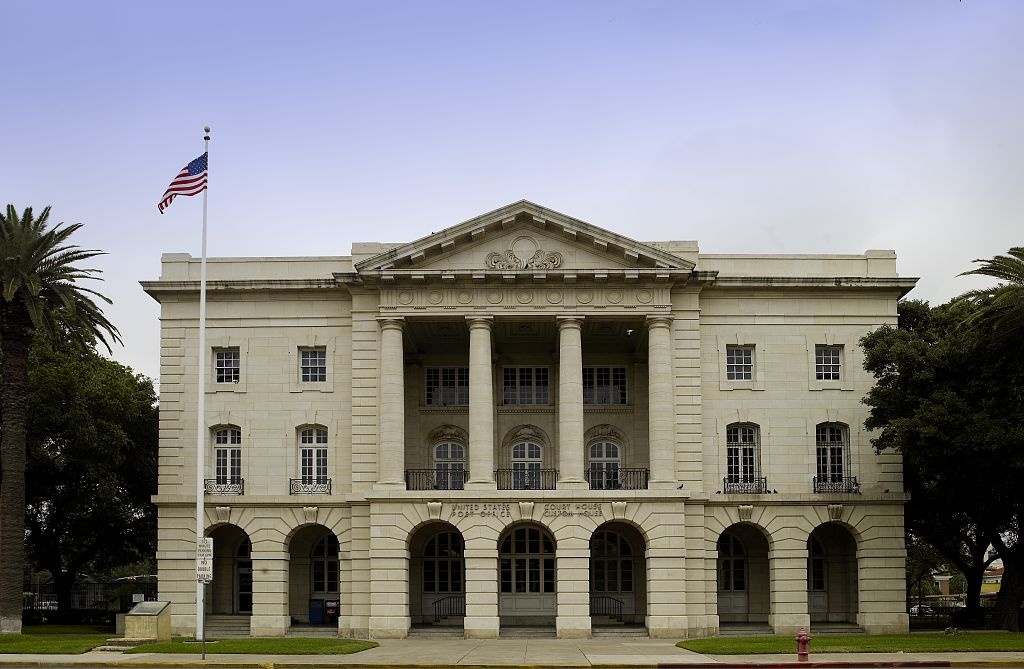
- U.S. Post Office and Courthouse, August 2003

- Location within Texas Location within the United States
- Interactive map showing the location of Laredo US Post Office, Court House and Custom House
- Location: 1300 Matamoros, Laredo, Texas
- Coordinates: 27°30′24″N 99°30′32″W
- Area: 1 acre (0.40 ha)
- Built: 1907
- Architectural style: Classical Revival
- NRHP reference No.: 01000516
- Added to NRHP: May 18, 2001

The U.S. Post Office and Courthouse is a historic government building located in Laredo in Webb County, Texas. It previously served as a custom house and a courthouse for the United States District Court for the Southern District of Texas. It continues to serve as a post office.

== Building history ==
Founded on the Rio Grande by a Spanish settler in 1755, the city of Laredo became part of Mexico in 1821. In 1840, Laredo was named capital of the Republic of the Rio Grande during a rebellion that Mexico soon quashed. Laredo's allegiance remained with Mexico until 1845, when the United States annexed Texas and the Mexican–American War subsequently began. In 1848, under the Treaty of Guadalupe Hidalgo, the two governments established the Rio Grande as the boundary between the United States and Mexico, making Laredo part of the United States. The following year, postal service in Laredo began.

During the late-19th century, Laredo entered a period of economic prosperity stimulated by the railroad, coal mining, and irrigated farming. The population tripled, and with this growth came a demand for government services. As Laredo became known as the gateway to Mexico, the federal government began preparations to construct a new post office, courthouse, and custom house. James Knox Taylor, Supervising Architect of the Treasury, designed the Neoclassical-style building. Early plans included an eight-foot-high wall that would have surrounded the building. After the public protested this restrictive component of the design, Taylor removed it. Groundbreaking commenced in 1905 and employees occupied the building, which cost $650,000 to construct, in 1907. In 1935, the Office of the Supervising Architect of the Treasury, then overseen by Louis A. Simon, designed an addition to the building to accommodate the growing space needs. The addition doubled the size of the building, which now occupies an entire city block. In 1962, the customs service vacated the building.

In 2004, a new federal courthouse was built to accommodate District and Magistrate court functions. The historic building continues to serve as a post office and federal courthouse, and contains office space for the U.S. Department of Justice.

The U.S. Post Office and Courthouse was listed in the National Register of Historic Places in 2001 for its historical and architectural significance.

== Architecture ==
The U.S. Post Office and Courthouse, a significant local landmark in Laredo, is an excellent example of the Neoclassical style of architecture. It is located at 1300 Matamoros in downtown Laredo, two blocks from City Hall and the Webb County Courthouse. The building displays many character-defining features of the Neoclassical style, which was commonly used in federal building design during the early-20th century because it conveyed a strong and dignified governmental presence. Constructed predominantly of limestone on the exterior, the building also employs high-quality materials such as terrazzo and marble on the interior. The street level of the south-facing, symmetrical facade is dominated by a series of round-arched openings that together form an arcade. Scrolled keystones top each arch. The rusticated limestone on the first story distinguishes the ground level from the smooth upper floors. On the second story, the area beneath a prominent central portico features three arched doorways separated by pilasters. The doorways are slightly recessed and are surrounded by decorative molding and surmounted with ornate carvings. Each carving includes an articulated keystone beneath an oval medallion crowned with a shell motif called a coquillage. Cornucopias of fruit and leaves flank the medallion. A dentil course tops each doorway. Large multi-pane tripartite windows occupy the third story. At the eastern and western ends of the facade, glazed, multi-pane doors on the second story have segmental arched openings with articulated surrounds and keystones. The doorways lead to small balconets that feature scrolled, cast iron railings. Windows on the third story are rectangular and feature surrounds similar to those on the second-story doors.

The projecting central portion of the upper stories contains a classical portico with a pediment supported by four, two-story Roman Doric order columns. The frieze contains triglyphs, incised patterns commonly paired with Doric columns, which alternate with paterae, circular medallions that occupy the spaces in the frieze called metopes. The tympanum, or triangular area of the pediment, contains a single, large, centrally placed patera that is flanked with a foliated pattern. Mutule blocks, another Doric detail, line the tympanum. Delicate cast-iron railings occupy the spaces between the columns. While the remaining elevations of the building are less ornate, they contain many classical features, including the incised first story and arched openings.

The dignified appearance of the exterior is carried through the interior. The postal lobby, which remains in use, has terrazzo floors. Plaster walls are decorated with marble baseboards and wainscoting and iron grilles featuring a square-and-x motif are located above postal boxes on some walls. The plaster ceiling is crowned by a molded cornice with dentils. The elevator lobby also features terrazzo flooring and decorative cast-iron elevator enclosures. A marble staircase that connects the second and third levels has a scrolled, cast-iron balustrade that terminates in a floral-motif pilaster.

The postal workroom remains in its original location at the center of the postal lobby corridors. The original walls, piers, and columns are clad in vertical wood wainscot with wood cap and base moldings on the lower portions with plaster above. However, the space has been altered to accommodate public service counters and additional postal boxes.

The courtrooms have been altered over time. The second-story courtroom was previously partitioned for office space, but converted back to a single room in 1972, although neither the furniture nor the finishes were restored. The third-floor courtroom retains its original plan. The cornice, doors, windows, radiator enclosures, and bench remain, although other original finishes have been removed or covered.

== Significant events ==
- 1849 – Postal service established in Laredo after it becomes part of U.S.
- 1905–1907 – Building constructed
- 1935 – Addition constructed
- 2001 – Building listed in the National Register of Historic Places as Laredo US Post Office, Court House and Custom House
- 2004 – District and Magistrate courts relocate

== Building facts ==
- Location: 1300 Matamoros
- Architects: James Knox Taylor; Louis A. Simon
- Construction Dates: 1905–1907; 1935
- Architectural Style: Neoclassical
- Landmark Status: Listed in the National Register of Historic Places
- Primary Materials: Limestone
- Prominent Features: First-floor Arcade; Portico with Roman Doric Columns

== See also ==
- National Register of Historic Places listings in Webb County, Texas
- List of United States federal courthouses in Texas
