= Tomás Sánchez (captain) =

Spanish captain (1709–1796)

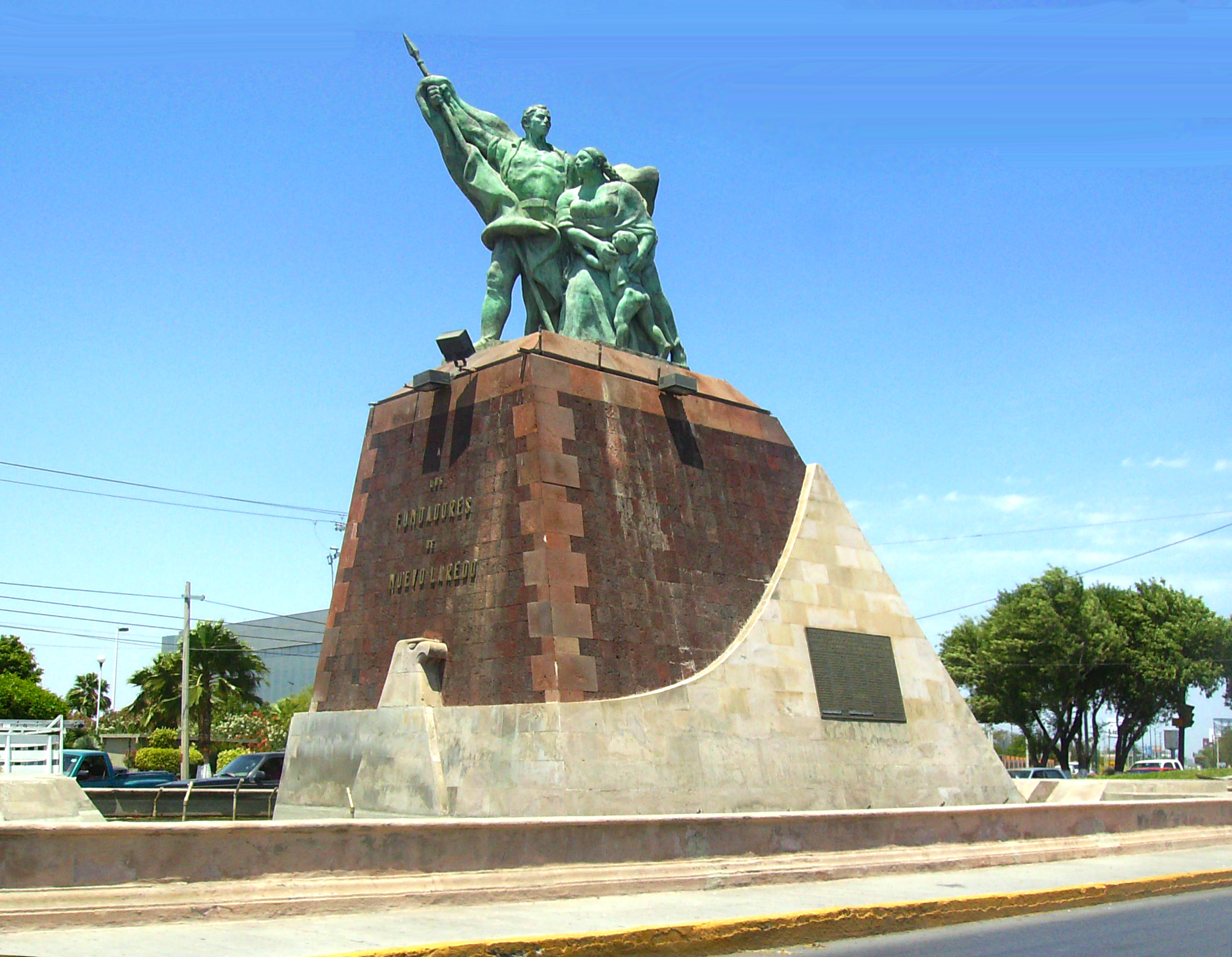
- Monument to the founding families of Nuevo Laredo
- Born: Tomás Sánchez de la Barrera; June 4, 1709; Ciénega de Flores, New Kingdom of León, Viceroyalty of New Spain (now Nuevo León, Mexico)
- Died: January 21, 1796 (aged 86); Villa de San Agustín de Laredo, New Santander, Viceroyalty of New Spain (now Nuevo Laredo, Tamaulipas, Mexico)
- Occupation: Captain

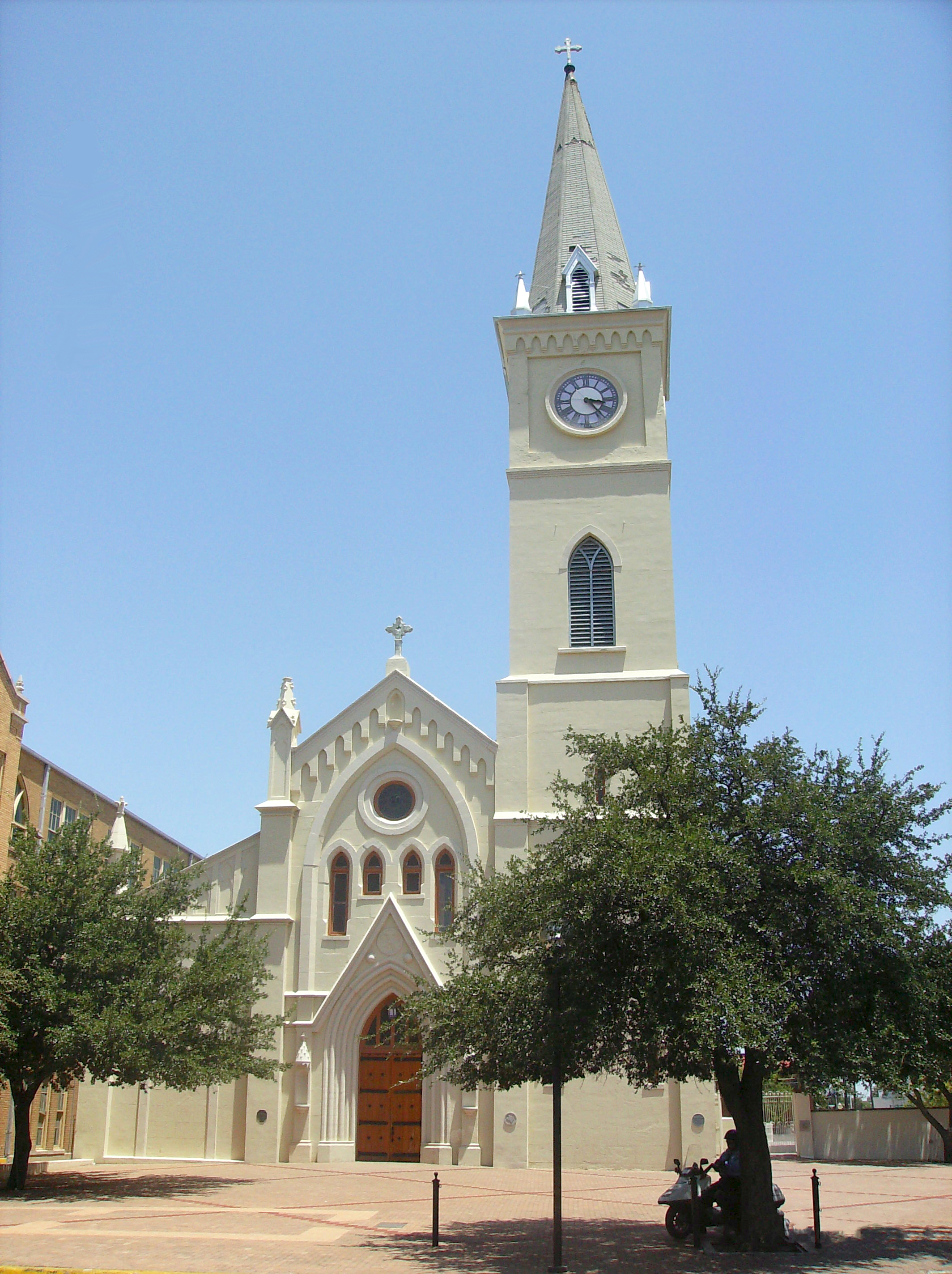
San Agustin Church was the first church established in the new town of Laredo built as a chapel in 1760

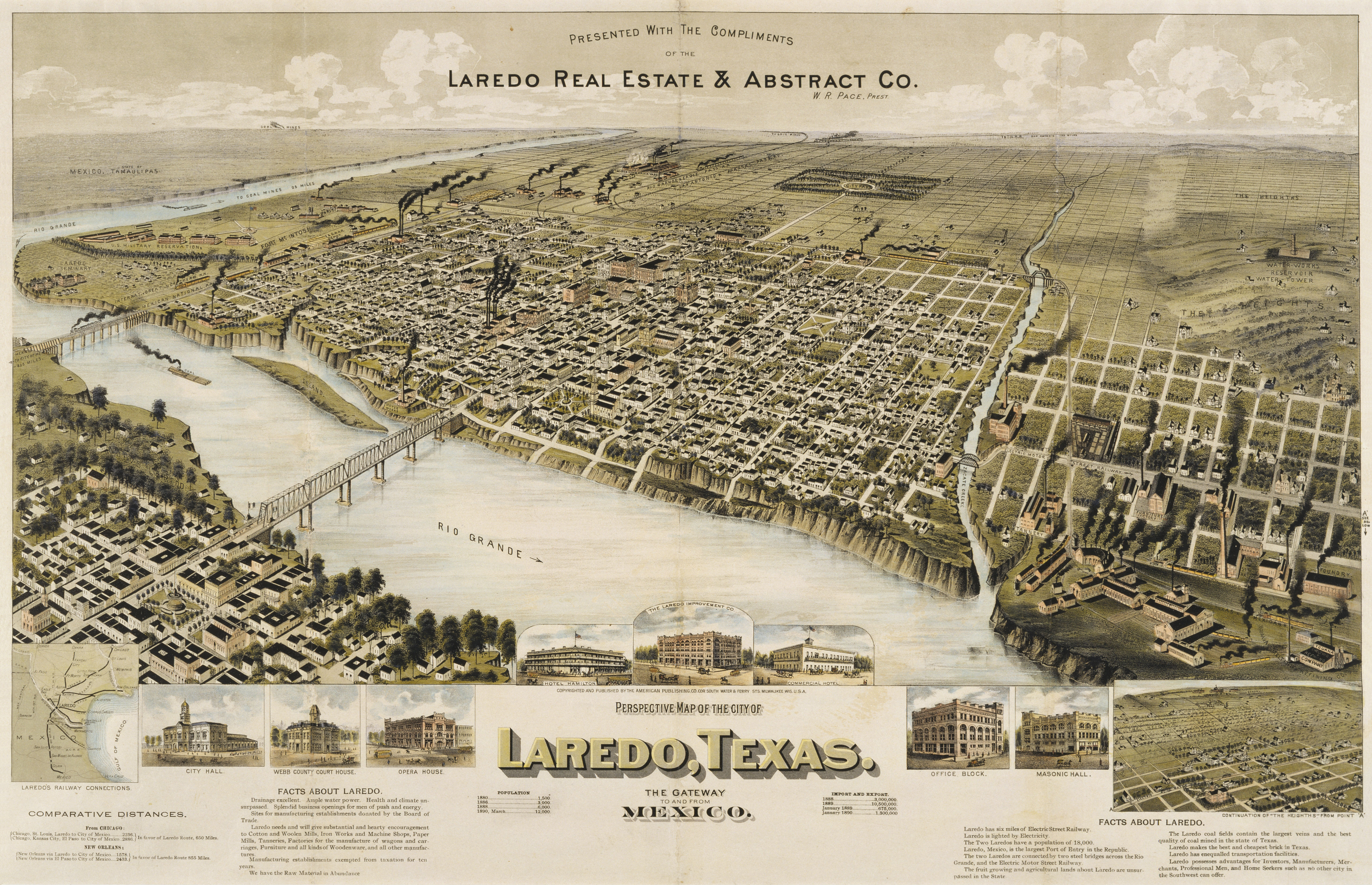
Map of Laredo 137 years after founding

Tomás Sánchez de la Barrera (June 4, 1709 – January 21, 1796) was a veteran Spanish captain who founded Laredo, Texas, United States.

== Origins ==
Captain Tomas Sanchez de la Barrera y de la Garza was born into northern Mexico's oligarchic families. His father's family roots can be traced to the old hidalgo families of Andalucia, Spain. His mother is descended from the noble Oñate-Zaldivar family, conquistadors of New Mexico; and the politically entrenched De La Garza family, conquerors of Nuevo León, Mexico, who controlled extensive lands from Saltillo to the Rio Grande.

== Founding of Laredo ==
He first arrived in Texas in 1749 to a place he named "El Paso de Jacinto", later called "Indian Ford", which is now west of Downtown Laredo. He then petitioned Colonel José de Escandón, 1st Count of Sierra Gorda for permission to found a town at this location. His petition was granted on May 15, 1755. He named the new townsite, Villa de San Agustín de Laredo, in honor of Saint Augustine and Colonel Escandon's hometown Laredo, Cantabria, Spain. Don Tomás Sánchez first established three families in the new villa. The site selected is located in the San Agustine Historical District in Downtown Laredo near the San Agustine Cathedral.

== Gallery of Old Laredo ==
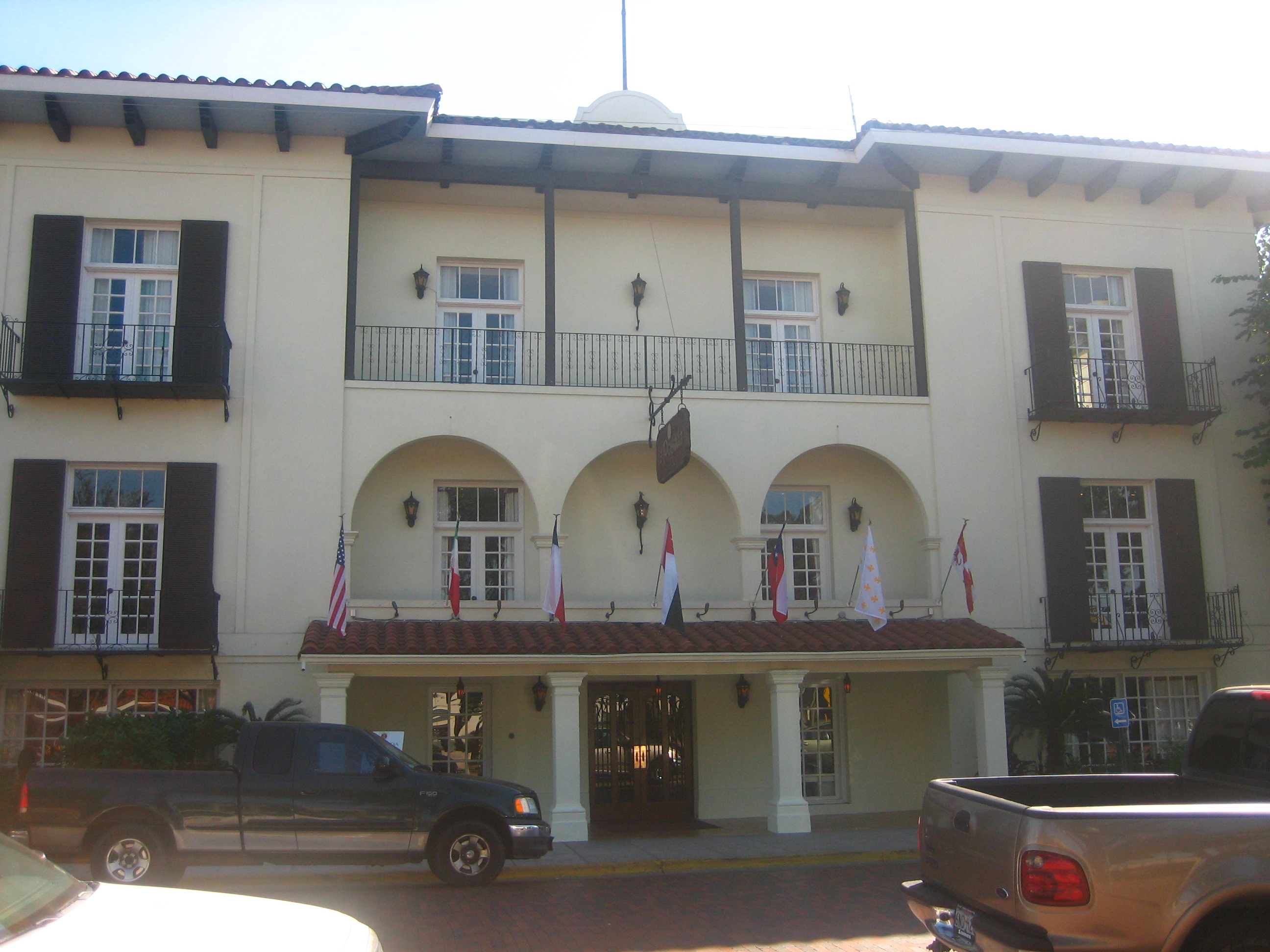
Typical Hacienda in the late 1700s in Laredo, now La Posada Hotel

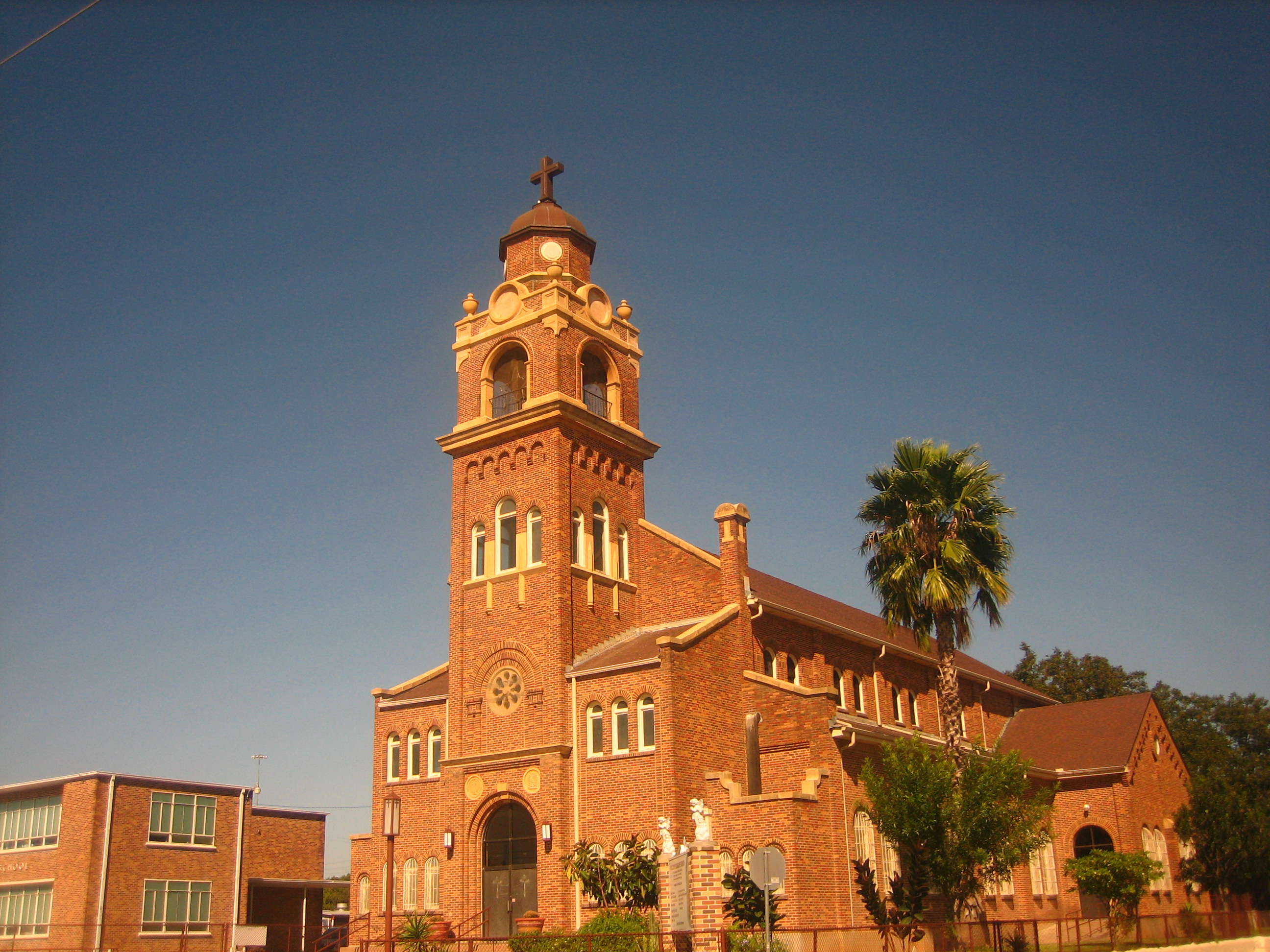
Our Lady of Guadalupe Catholic Church

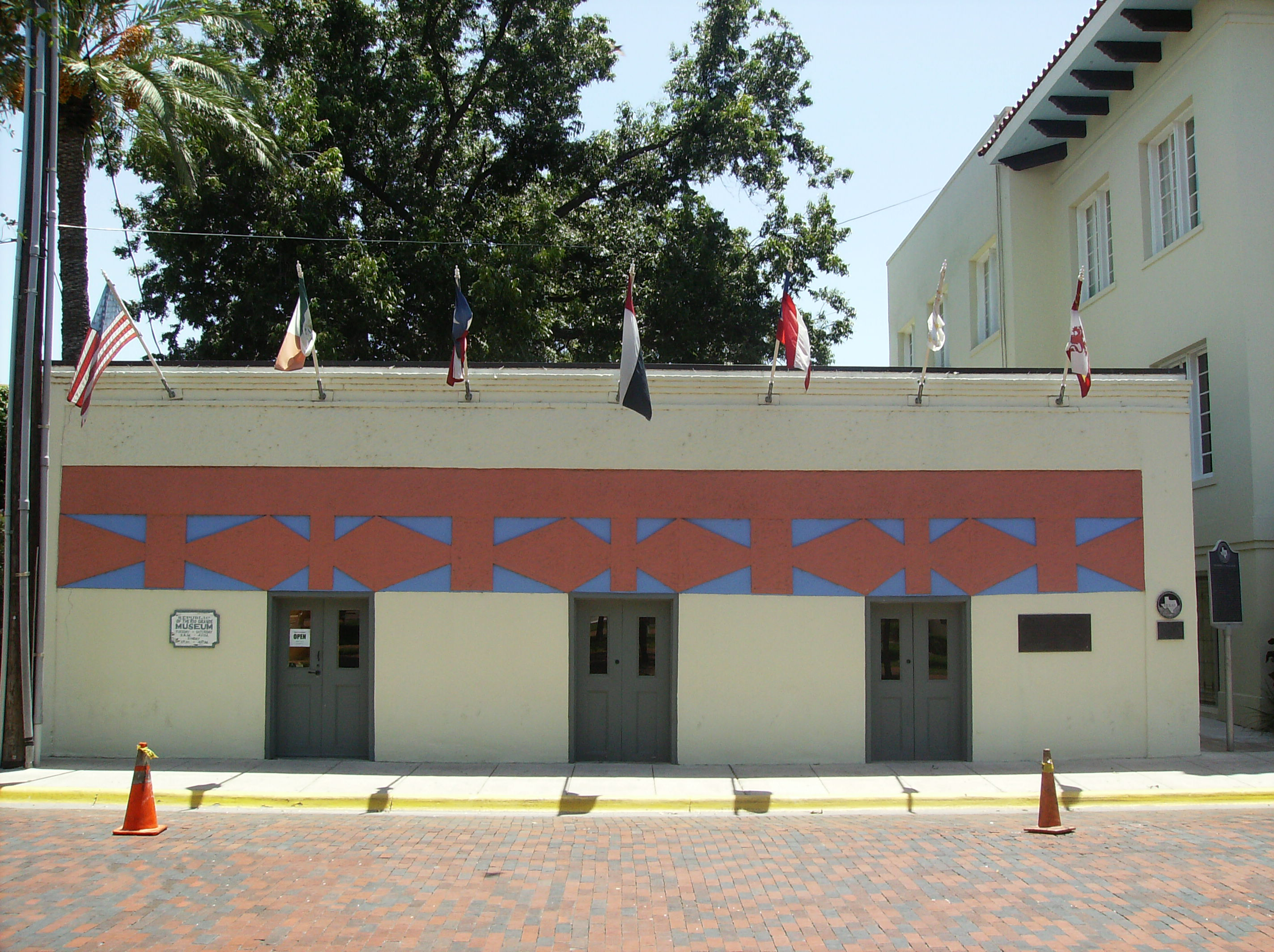
Typical home in the late 1700s, later the Republic of the Rio Grande Capitol building, now a museum
