= San Agustin de Laredo Historic District =

Historic district in Texas, United States

- U.S. National Register of Historic Places
- U.S. Historic district
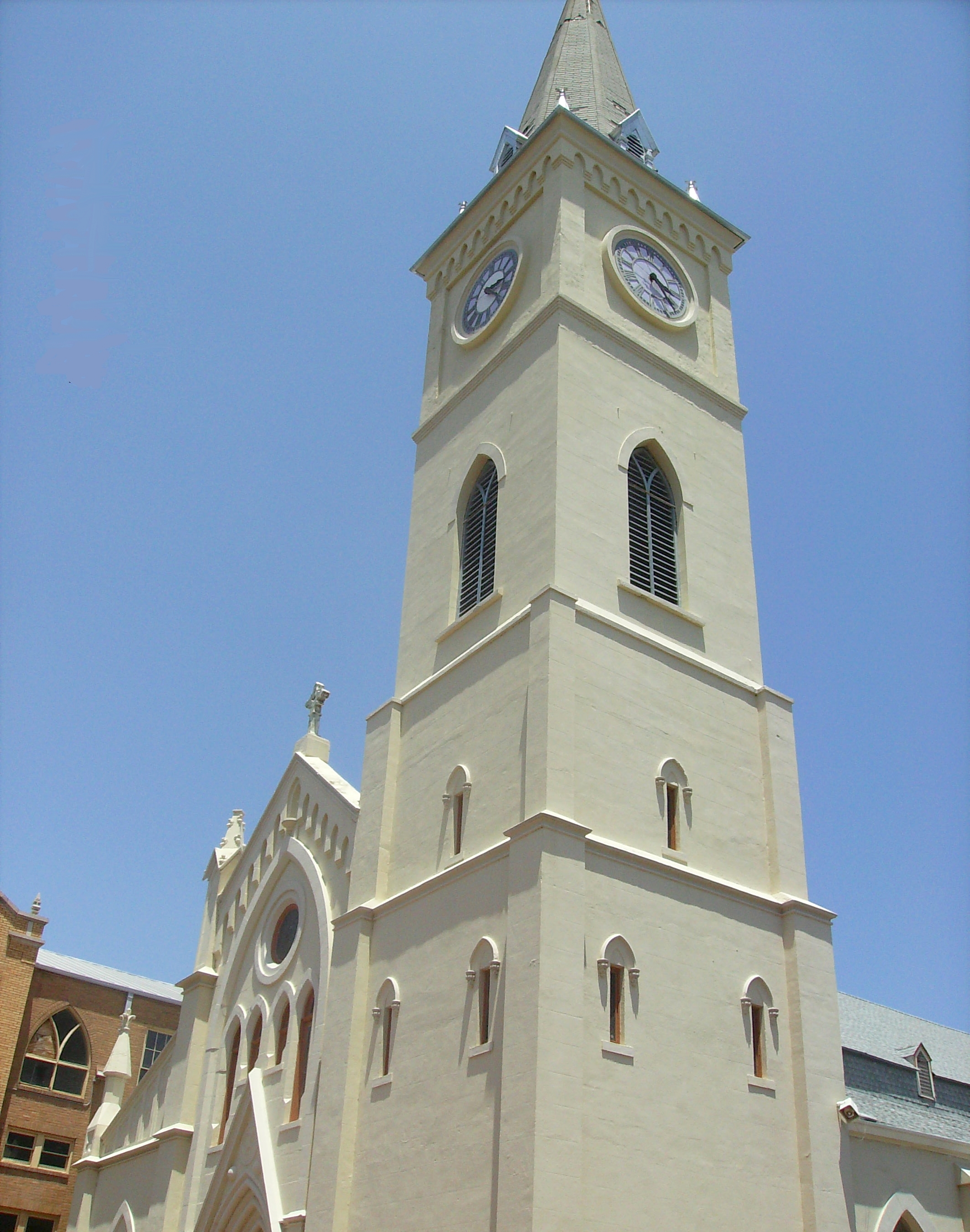
- San Agustin de Laredo Historic District was named after the San Agustin Cathedral

- Location within Texas Location within the United States
- Location: Roughly bounded by Grant and Water Sts., Convent and San Bernardino Aves., Laredo, Texas
- Coordinates: 27°30′7″N 99°30′19″W
- Area: 23.9 acres (9.7 ha)
- Built: 1872
- Architect: Santos Benavides, Don Jose Reyes Ortiz
- Architectural style: Greek Revival, Mission/Spanish Revival
- NRHP reference No.: 73001983
- Added to NRHP: September 19, 1973

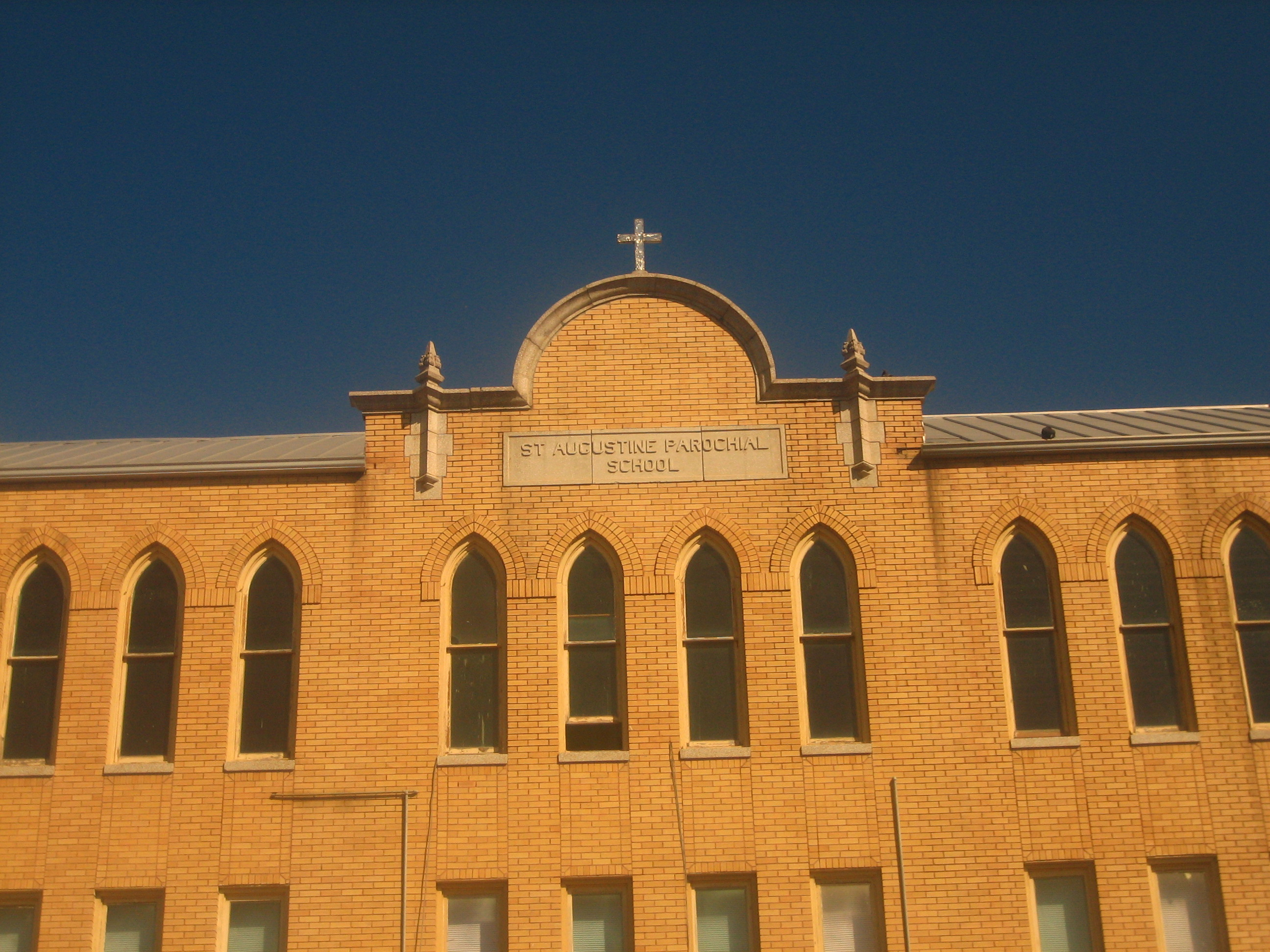
The St. Agustine Parochial School existed at the San Agustin Historical District in front of the San Agustin Plaza from 1927-1976. The structure, adjacent to San Agustin Cathedral, is a Roman Catholic educational center.

The San Agustin de Laredo Historic District is a historical district that covers what was once the original city of Laredo, Texas that was established by Don Tomás Sánchez. Today, the district is located in Downtown Laredo. The San Agustin District is home to San Agustin Cathedral (which the district's named after) and to the Republic of the Rio Grande Capitol. Most of the district's streets are made from bricks. Most of the buildings in the district reflect Spanish and Mexican influences and are made from masonry. The district is considered the last example of Spanish Colonization of the Lower Rio Grande Valley. The San Agustin de Laredo Historic District is registered in the National Register of Historic Places since 1973. Its historic significance is Architecture and Engineering. Its architectural style is Mission, Spanish Revival, and Greek Revival.

== Gallery of San Agustin Historic District ==
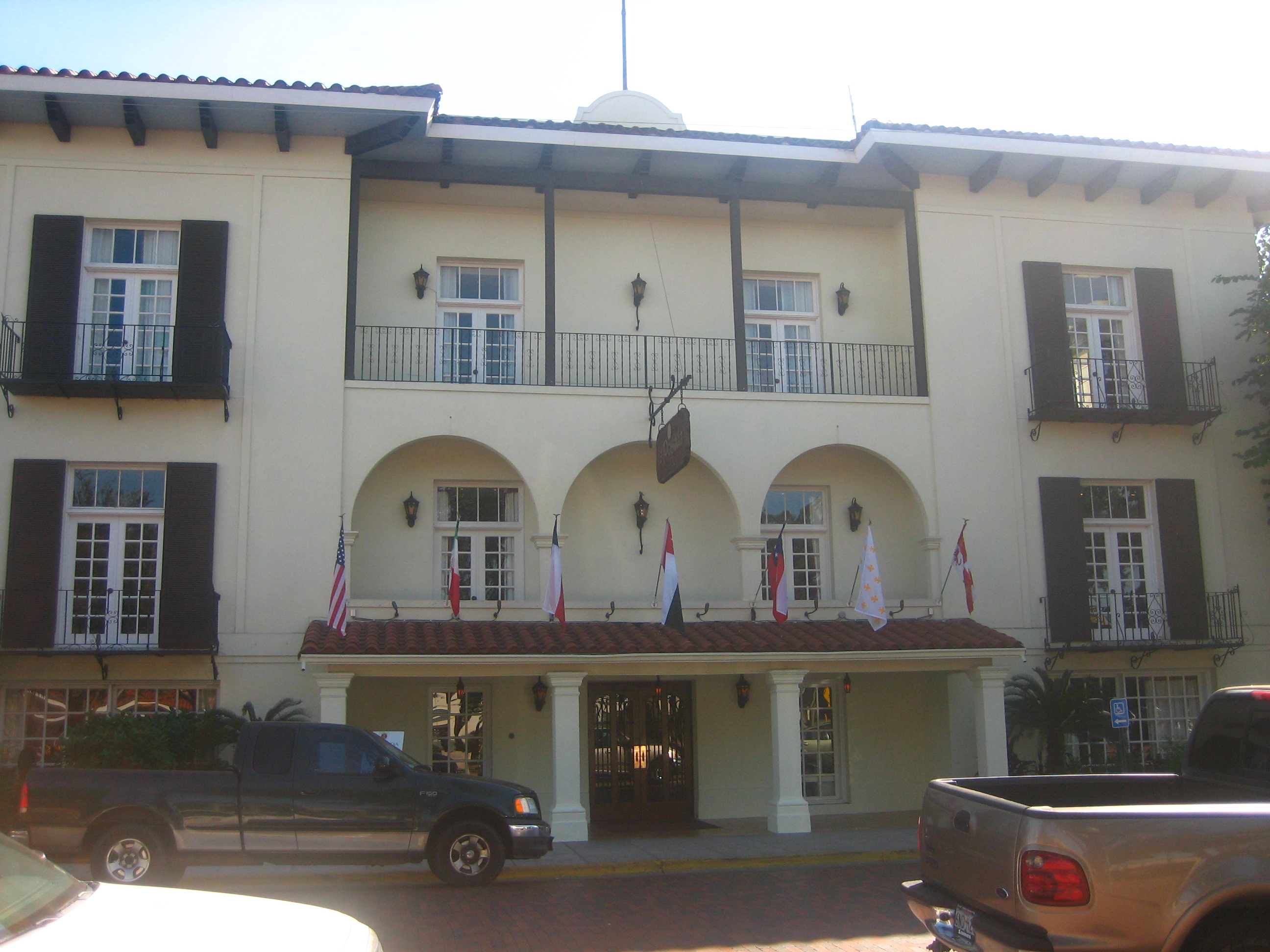
Typical Hacienda in the late 1700s in Laredo, now La Posada Hotel

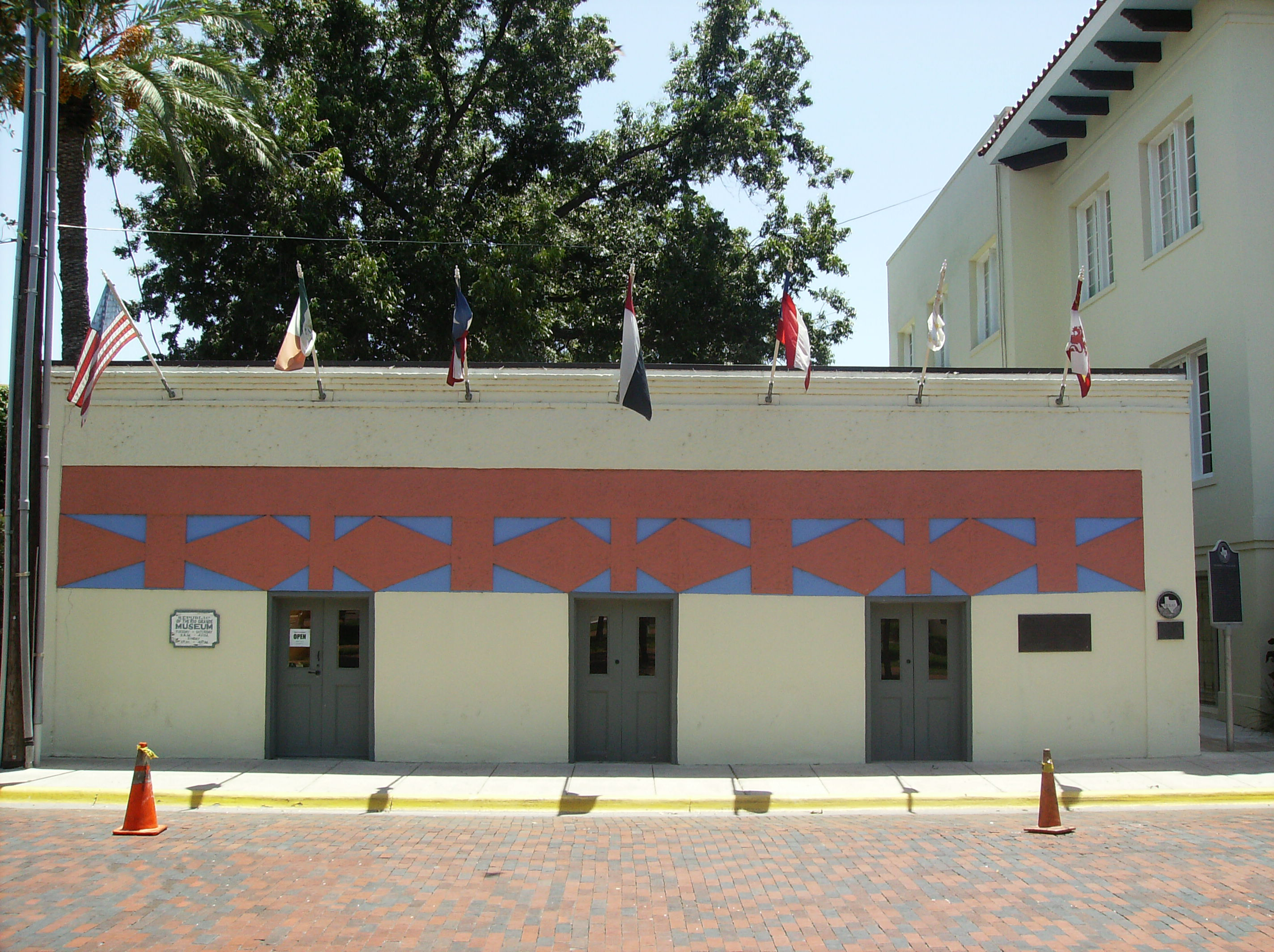
Typical home in the late 1700s, later the Republic of the Rio Grande Capitol building, now a museum

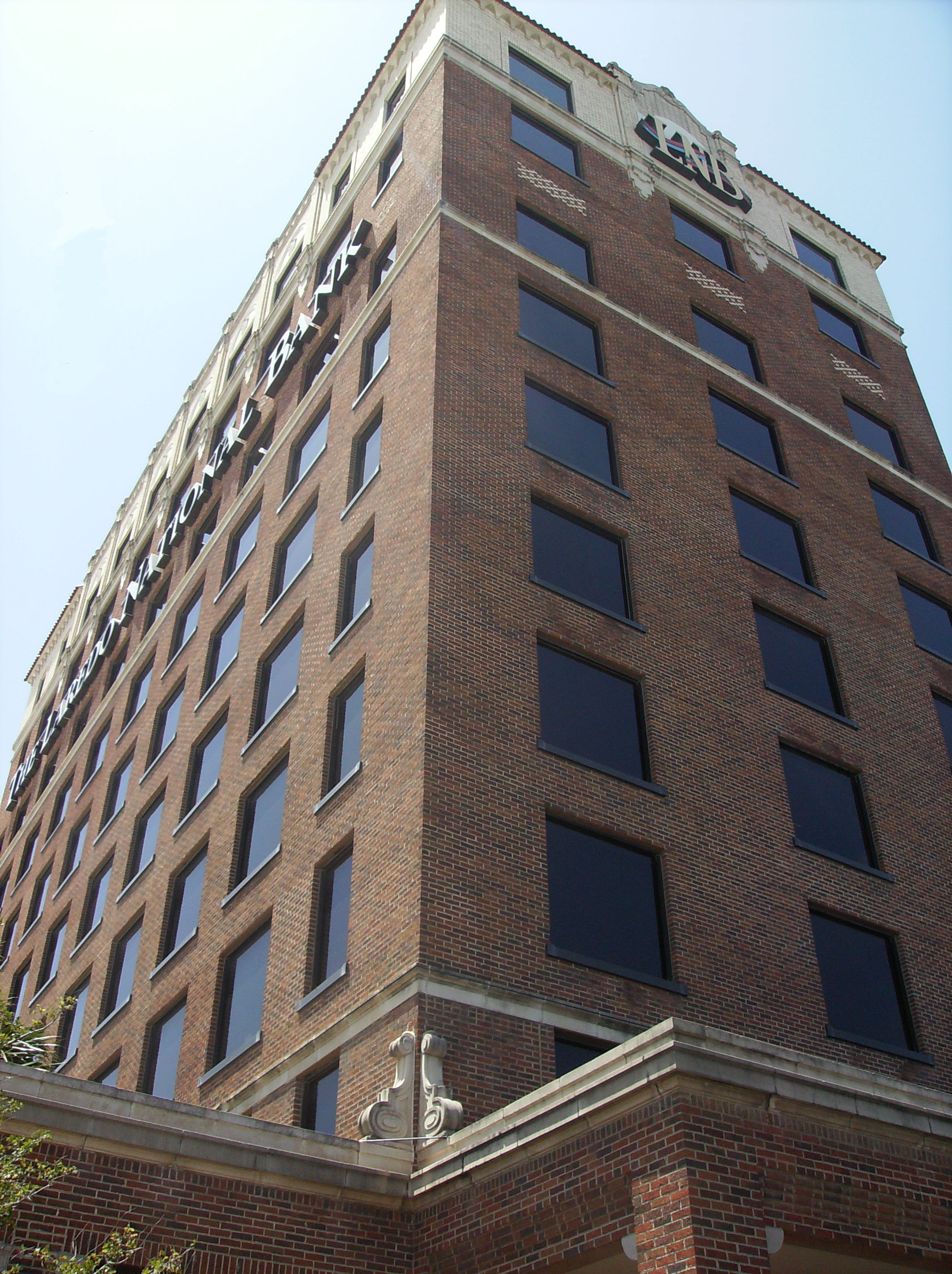
The Laredo National Bank Headquarters is located on the eastern boundary of the historical district

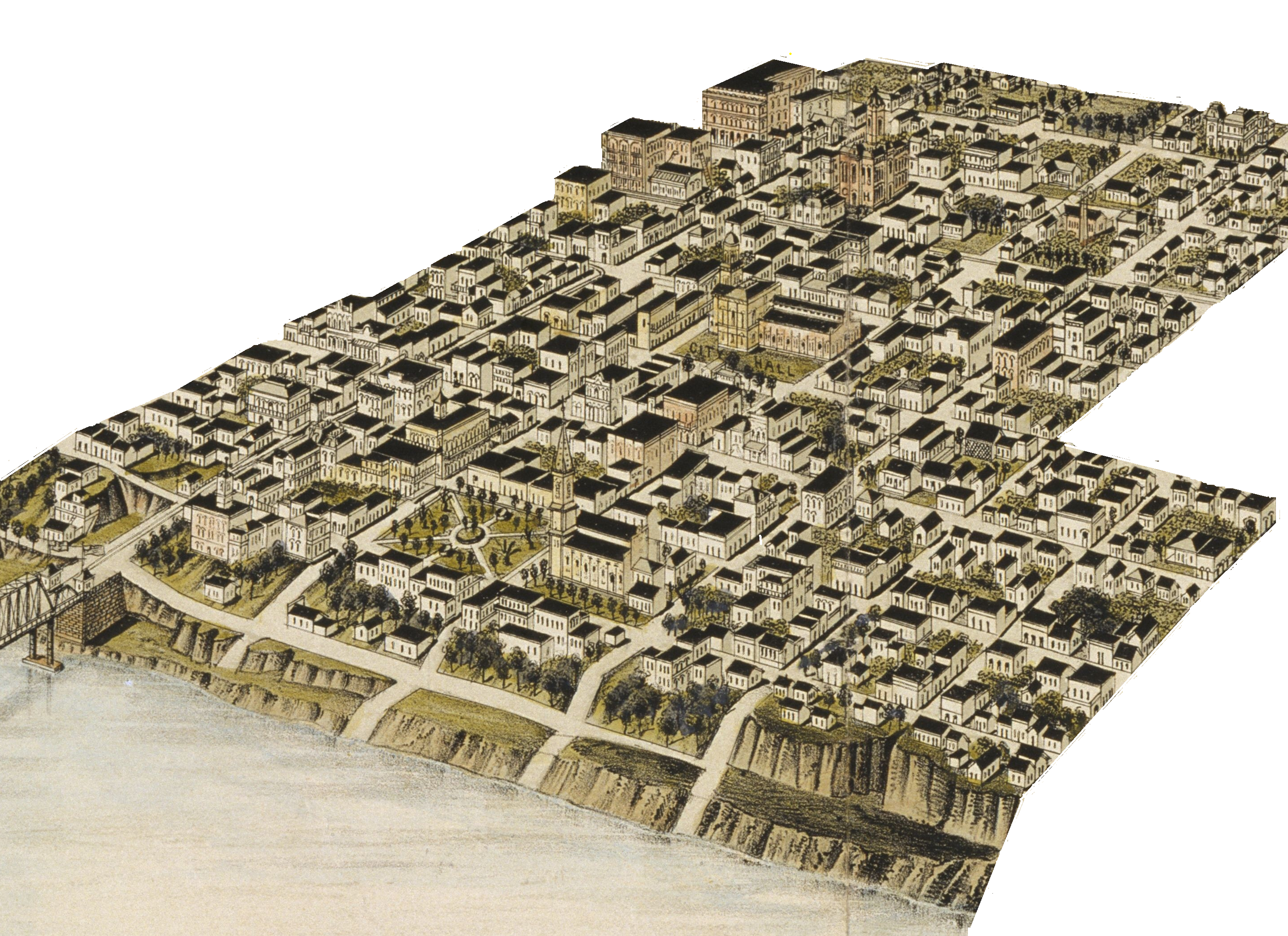
Map of the San Agustin Historical District in 1892

== See also ==
- National Register of Historic Places listings in Webb County, Texas
