= The Outlet Shoppes at Laredo =

Coordinates: 27.5017°N 99.5101°W

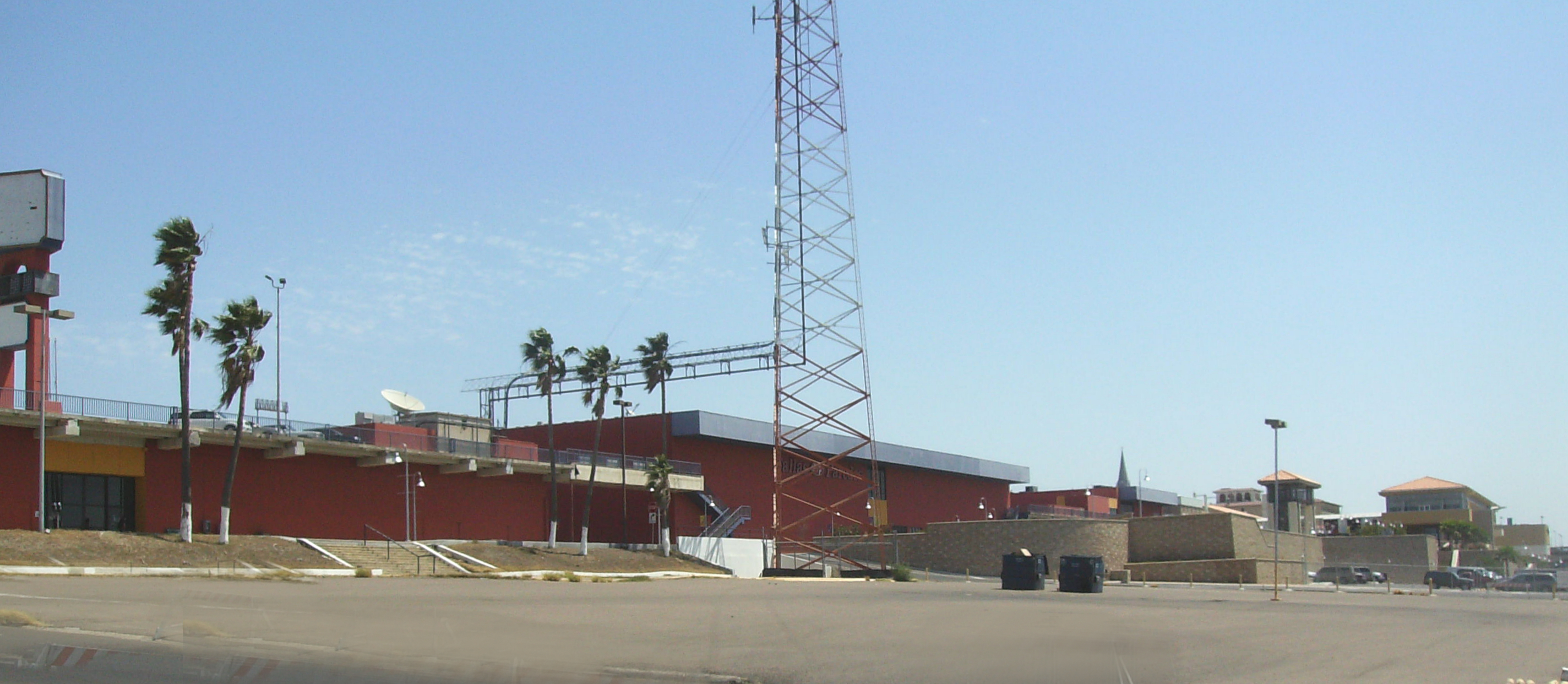
- El Portal Mall
- Location: Laredo, Texas, U.S.
- Address: 1600 Water Street, Laredo, Texas 78040
- Opened: 1970 (as River Drive Mall); March 2017 (as The Outlet Shoppes at Laredo)
- Closed: 2003 (as River Drive Mall)
- Developer: Horizon Group
- Manager: Horizon Group Properties
- Owner: Horizon Group Properties / CBL
- Num. of stores: 50+
- Floor area: 358,000 sq. ft.
- Floors: 3
- Website: theoutletshoppesatlaredo.com

The Outlet Shoppes at Laredo is an outlet mall in downtown Laredo, Texas, featuring over 50 name-brand stores.

Both the I-35 exit and Mexico pedestrian bridge lead to the mall, located at 1600 Water Street.

== History ==
=== River Drive Mall ===
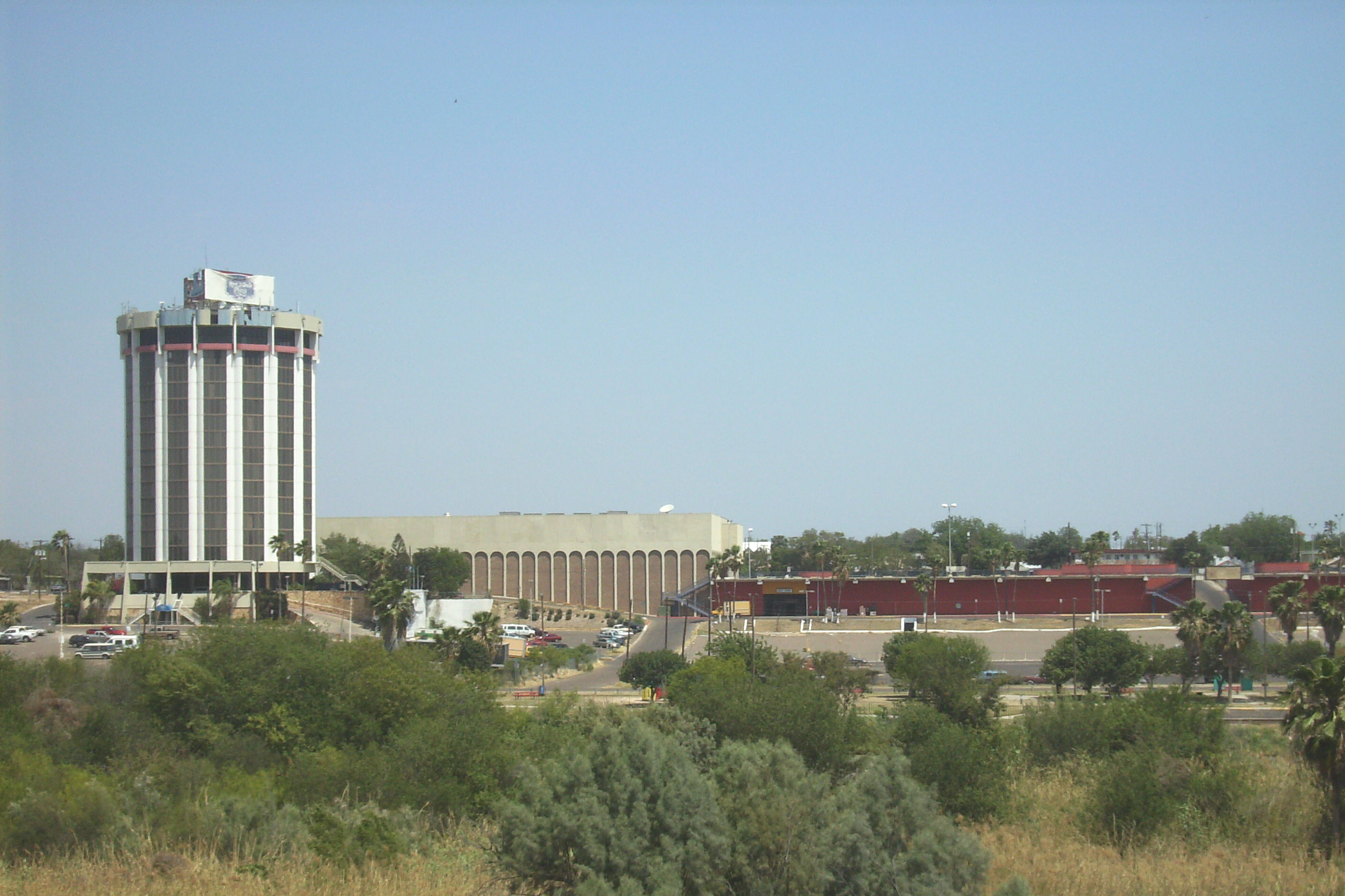
River Drive Mall view from Nuevo Laredo, Tamaulipas will be demolished to make way for the new Outlet Shoppes at Laredo

River Drive Mall began operating in 1970 and was the first enclosed shopping center in Laredo. River Drive Mall permanently closed in 2003.

=== The Outlet Shoppes at Laredo ===
On June 12, 2013, Horizon Group Properties and the City of Laredo announced the development of an outlet center in place of the River Drive Mall. The outlet mall feature 50+ outlet stores in a newly planned 3 level open air building. El Portal Center was demolished in 2014 for the new building. The Outlet Shoppes at Laredo opened in May 2017.
