= National Register of Historic Places listings in Webb County, Texas =

Location of Webb County in Texas

This is a list of the National Register of Historic Places listings in Webb County, Texas.

This is intended to be a complete list of properties and districts listed on the National Register of Historic Places in Webb County, Texas. There are five districts and five individual properties listed on the National Register in the county. One property is also a State Antiquities Landmark, and two districts contain several Recorded Texas Historic Landmarks.

This National Park Service list is complete through NPS recent listings posted March 21, 2025.

== Current listings ==
The publicly disclosed locations of National Register properties and districts may be seen in a mapping service provided.

| | Name on the Register | Image | Date listed | Location | City or town | Description |
|---|---|---|---|---|---|---|
| 1 | Barrio Azteca Historic District | Barrio Azteca Historic District | May 21, 2003 (#03000431) | Roughly bounded by I-35, Matamoros St., Arroyo Zacate, and the Rio Grande; 27°30′09″N 99°29′54″W | Laredo | |
| 2 | Fort McIntosh | Fort McIntosh | June 25, 1975 (#75002011) | Laredo College campus 27°30′28″N 99°31′17″W | Laredo | Includes Recorded Texas Historic Landmark |
| 3 | Hamilton Hotel | Hamilton Hotel | April 14, 1992 (#92000363) | 815 Salinas St. 27°30′25″N 99°30′30″W | Laredo | |
| 4 | Laredo U.S. Post Office, Court House and Custom House | Laredo U.S. Post Office, Court House and Custom House | May 18, 2001 (#01000516) | 1300 Matamoros; 27°30′24″N 99°30′32″W | Laredo | |
| 5 | Los Ojuelos | | December 22, 1976 (#76002084) | 2.5 mi (4.0 km). S of Mirando City on SR 649; 27°24′12″N 98°59′42″W | Mirando City | |
| 6 | Pan-American Courts and Cafe | | January 24, 2022 (#100007392) | 3301 San Bernardo Ave. 27°31′46″N 99°30′15″W | Laredo | |
| 7 | San Augustin de Laredo Historic District | San Augustin de Laredo Historic District | September 19, 1973 (#73001983) | Roughly bounded by Grant and Water Sts., Convent and San Bernardino Aves. 27°30′07″N 99°30′19″W | Laredo | Includes Recorded Texas Historic Landmarks |
| 8 | San Jose de Palafox Historic/Archeological District | San Jose de Palafox Historic/Archeological District | July 24, 1973 (#73001984) | Address restricted | Laredo | |
| 9 | U.S. Inspection Station - Laredo, Texas | U.S. Inspection Station - Laredo, Texas | September 10, 2014 (#14000600) | 100 Convent Avenue; 27°30′06″N 99°30′26″W | Laredo | |
| 10 | Webb County Courthouse | Webb County Courthouse | May 4, 1981 (#81000635) | 1000 Houston St. 27°30′26″N 99°30′20″W | Laredo | State Antiquities Landmark |

== See also ==
- National Register of Historic Places listings in Texas
- Recorded Texas Historic Landmarks in Webb County
