= Cathedral of San Agustin (Laredo, Texas) =

Historic church in Texas, United States

- San Augustine Church
- U.S. Historic district – Contributing property
- Recorded Texas Historic Landmark
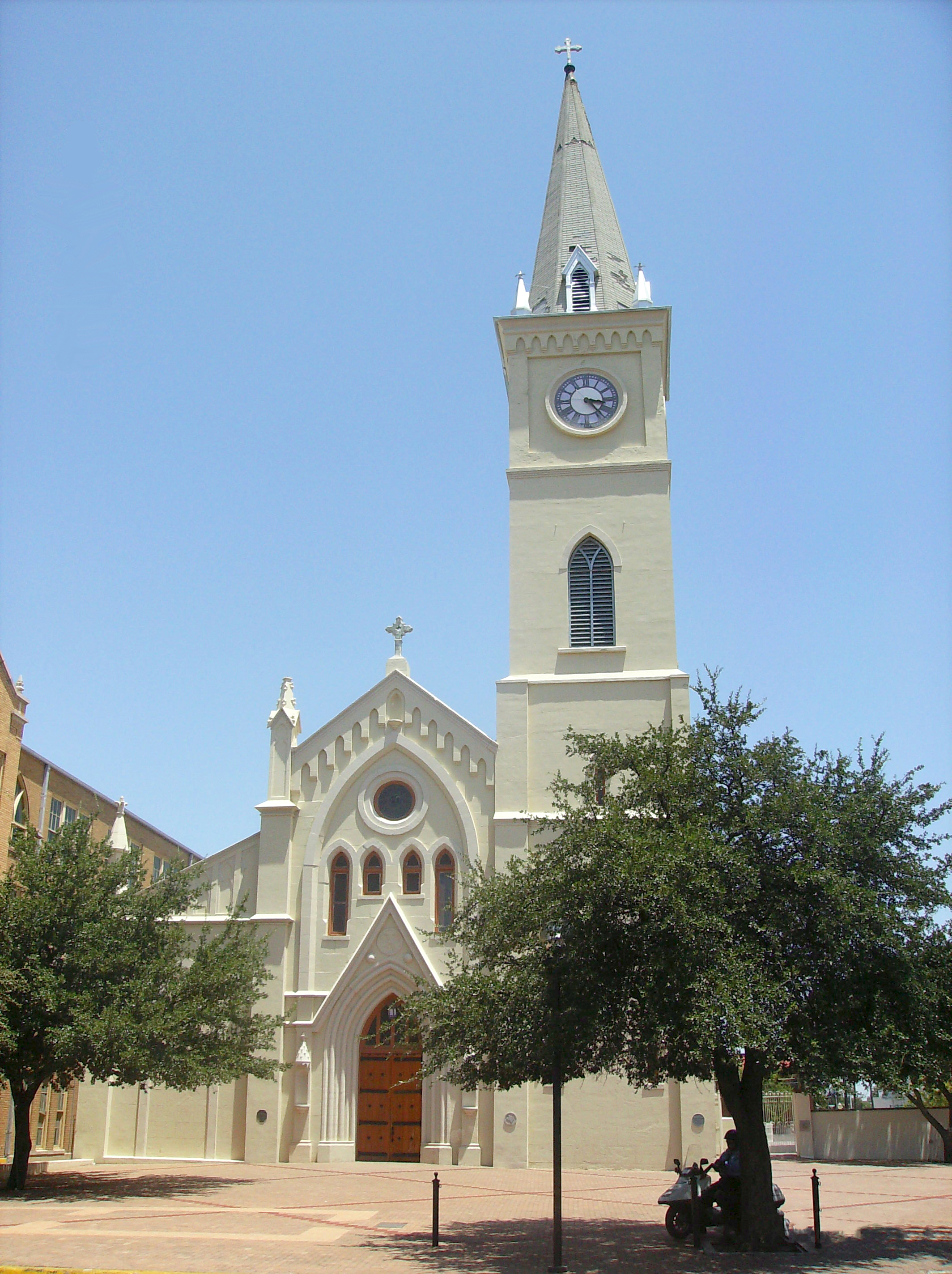

- Location within Texas Location within the United States
- Location: 201 San Agustín Ave. Laredo, Texas
- Coordinates: 27°30′8.98″N 99°30′18.69″W
- Built: 1866-1872
- Architect: Rev. Pierre Yves Kéralum
- Architectural style: Gothic Revival
- Part of: San Agustin de Laredo Historic District (ID73001983)
- RTHL No.: 5029

Significant dates
- Added to NRHP: September 19, 1973
- Designated RTHL: 1963

The Cathedral of San Agustin (Spanish: Catedral de San Agustín) is the seat of the Catholic Diocese of Laredo, Texas. It is located at 201 San Agustin Avenue in the San Agustin Historical District in Laredo.

The first church building, an adobe chapel, was erected in 1767. It was replaced by a larger stone church in 1810. The present church building dates from 1872.

As of June 30th 2026, the bishop of Laredo is Bishop John Jairo Gomez.

== History ==
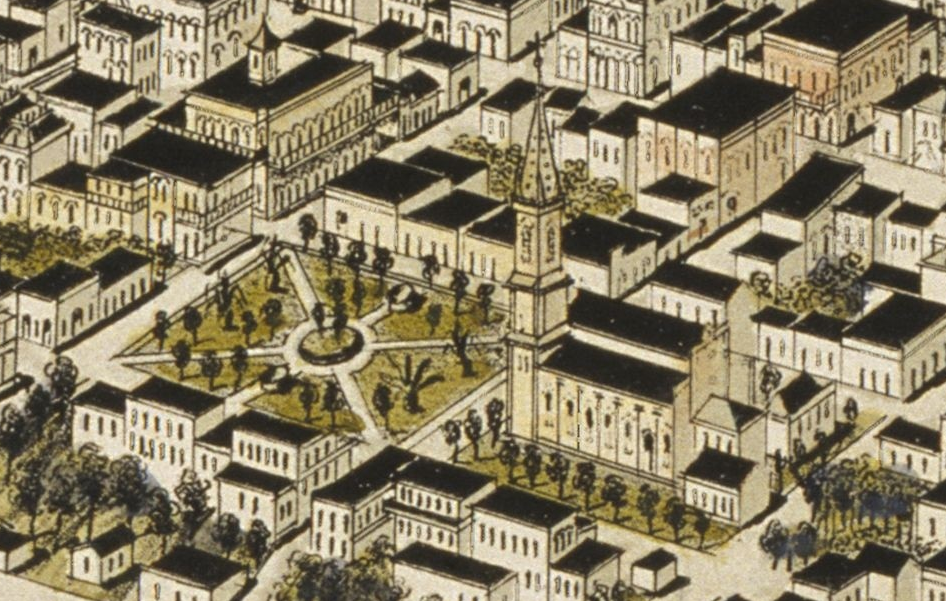
San Agustin Church, Laredo, Texas (1892)

In 1755, a Spanish army officer founded the Villa de San Agustin de Laredo in what was then the province of Nuevo Santander. The bishop of the Diocese of Guadalajara in New Spain, Francisco de San Buena Ventura, sent Reverend Fr. Juan José de Lafita y Verri to serve as the first priest in Laredo. In 1767, Verri constructed a small mission chapel, the first Catholic church in Laredo.

In 1778, the first stone structure was erected to accommodate more than two hundred families. In 1789, San Agustin was established as a parish by the bishop of the Diocese of Linares in Mexico. During this period, a number of Carrizo Indians living in Laredo were converted to Catholicism. The parish attempted to build a larger church in 1800, but it was abandoned. In 1805, Bishop Marín de Porras from the Diocese of Monterey in Mexico became the first prelate to visit Laredo.

The parish attempted another rebuilding of the church in 1810, but was hampered by lack of funds and attacks by Comanche and Apache raiders. After the War of Mexican Independence in 1821, the church project was put on hold.

In 1848, with the end of the Mexican-American War, Laredo became part of the Diocese of Galveston in the United States. Bishop John M. Odin assigned several French priests to this part of his territory. The Reverend Allophone Martin Souchon began the construction of the present church in 1866. It opened on December 12, 1872.

In 1905, the front wall and façade of the church developed cracks during a violent storm. They were fixed in 1912. A clock was installed in the church tower and the church was renovated in 1919. In 1922, the diocese transferred the operation of San Agustin Church to the Oblates of Mary Immaculate religious order.

The parish in 1946 added a 40-foot altar area to the east end of the building, along with two sacristies. The project also included the construction of a baptistry and chapel at the west end of the church. The Oblates in 1985 surrendered control of San Agustin back to the diocese.

From 1989 to 1994, the San Agustin Church Historical Preservation and Restoration Society carried out a US$675,000 restoration project of the church. A new Blessed Sacrament Chapel was installed. The whole church was repaired and restored and a brick plaza was created along the front of the church.

In 2000, Pope John Paul II erected the Diocese of Laredo and designated San Agustin Church as its cathedrall. Today, the San Agustin Cathedral is one of the oldest in the Southwest still standing. It is also the second tallest building in Laredo. The San Agustin de Laredo Historic District is in the National Register of Historical Places.

== Description ==
The Cathedral of San Agustin is a Gothic Revival structure with a five-story, 141 ft (43m) bell / clock tower. All the windows have the traditional Gothic shape with stained glass located between structural bays of its masonry walls. A French priest, Pierre Yves Keralum, was the designer and architect for this historical monument.

== See also ==
- List of Catholic cathedrals in the United States
- List of cathedrals in the United States
- Cathedral
- Roman Catholic Church
- Laredo, Texas
- List of buildings in Laredo, Texas
- Recorded Texas Historic Landmarks in Webb County, Texas
