= Cigarroa =

Cigarroa may refer to:

- Francisco G. Cigarroa (born 1957), American physician
- Cigarroa High School, high school in Texas, United States
- Cigarroa Middle School, middle school in Texas, United States
