= Vidal M. Trevino School of Communications and Fine Arts =

School in Texas, United States

Coordinates: 27.522267°N 99.475201°W

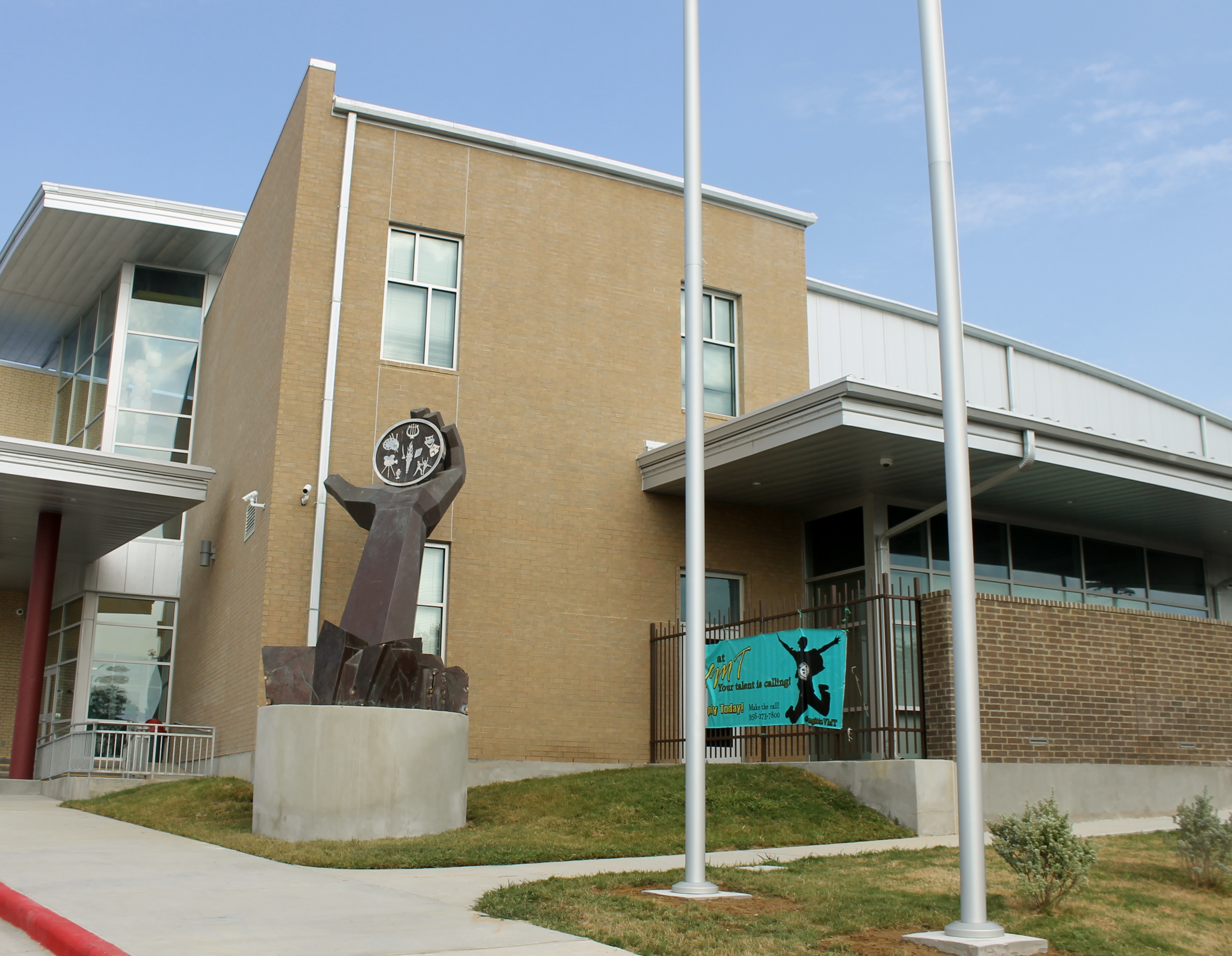
Trevino School of Communications opened across from J. W. Nixon High School in August 2015 at the location of the former sanctuary of the First Baptist Church.

The Vidal M. Treviño School of Communications and Fine Arts is a fine arts and communications high school in Laredo, Texas, founded in 1993 by Vidal M. Treviño, the LISD superintendent and a former member of the Texas House of Representatives. High school students from all three of the Laredo Independent School District high schools - Cigarroa High School, Martin High School and J. W. Nixon High School - meeting the acceptance requirements come to the school either in the morning or in the afternoon. They take one core academic class and one fine art or communication class. The academic classes are taught at the Pre-AP or AP level, meaning a more rigorous curriculum than regular level academic classes.

== History ==
VMT opened in the fall of 1993, using public buildings such as the Laredo Civic Center and the Holding Institute. Today, the campus is housed in historic buildings throughout the downtown St. Peter's Historical District of Laredo. Later that year, the main building (the old Warren G. Harding Jr. High School) was opened and is used for core academic classes. The Music, Dance, Communications, Visual Art, and Theatre Art classes are in buildings and houses across the street or a few blocks down from the main building.

== School of Visual Arts ==
The VMT Visual Arts program teaches the art students painting and sketching, of course, but they also must take as a requirement to graduate, Metal Arts and Sculpture classes. Here they learn how to make small statues and jewelry. Students make posters and artwork for school functions, participate in the annual "Tapestry" literary magazine, and participate in many local art shows.

== School of Dance ==
The VMT Dance Department offers students various dance classes, such as ballet Folklorico, classical ballet & jazz, flamenco, and modern ballet & tap. These students have performed at the local, state, and national level competitions with great success.

== School of Theatre ==
The VMT Theatre Department offers acting, directing, and technical production classes. The students prepare monthly performances for their colleagues and community. Every summer, students collaborate with the local community college and university Theatre Arts students, performing well-known Broadway plays. Past productions include "The King and I", "You're a Good Man, Charlie Brown", "Fame!", "Anything Goes", "West Side Story", "Beauty and the Beast" "Oliver!" "The Wiz" and "The King and I."

== School of Music ==
The VMT Music Department is the largest fine arts program at VMT. Courses offered include low brass studies, high brass studies, woodwind studies, orchestral strings, piano, guitar, steel drums, and vocal ensemble are also available. In addition to applied lessons with their respective teachers, students may join various ensembles, including The VMT Philharmonic Orchestra, SoundTown (showband), Conical Con-X-ion (low brass ensemble), Camerata Winds, or Conjunto Extremo. Mariachi and rondalla guitar ensembles are also popular. These groups regularly perform across the City, and at various local, state, and national competitions. Known as the "Hanon Society," this piano performance group is the only one of its kind in South Texas. The MIDI Department offers classes in experimental music, using synthesizers and computer technology for compositional purposes.

== School of Communications ==
The Communications Department offers classes in radio and television broadcasting, audio and video production as well as newspaper and creative writing. The Communications department staff includes long time journalist Mark Webber and audio and video production specialist Carlos Imperial.
