= Alicia Dickerson Montemayor =

American Latino activist

Alice Dickerson Montemayor
- Born: Alice Dickerson; August 6, 1902; Laredo, Webb County, Texas, United States
- Died: May 13, 1989 (aged 86)
- Resting place: Calvary Catholic Cemetery in Laredo, Texas
- Education: Laredo High School; Laredo Junior College
- Occupations: Political activist Community organizer
- Known for: Vice President of the League of United Latin American Citizens
- Spouse(s): Francisco Montemayor, Sr.
- Children: Francisco Montemayor, Jr. Aurelio Montemayor

Alice Dickerson Montemayor (August 6, 1902 – May 13, 1989) was an American civil rights activist from Laredo, Texas, the first woman elected to a national office not specifically designated for a woman, having served as vice president general of the interest group, the League of United Latin American Citizens. She was the first woman to serve as associate editor of the LULAC newspaper and the first to write a charter to fund a LULAC youth group. Montemayor urged the inclusion of girls and women into Latin American activism and also promoted the interests of middle-class Mexican-Americans. She is a designated honoree of Women's History Month of the National Women's History Project.

== Early life ==
Dickerson was born in Laredo to John Randolph Dickerson and the former Manuela Barrera. She was of Irish and Hispanic heritage and was reared bilingual, a rarity in many La Raza homes at the time. In 1924, she graduated from the former Laredo High School, since Martin High School. After graduation, Montemayor attempted to study law, but after the death of her father, she remained in Laredo with her mother. For a year, she attended Laredo Business School in the evenings. On September 8, 1927, she married Francisco Montemayor; they had two sons, Francisco and Aurelio Montemayor.

In 1934, Montemayor became a social worker for Webb County, where she investigated cases to place Mexican-Americans on welfare during the Great Depression. Upon starting this position, she was denied a key to the office and had to labor under a tree. Some of the Caucasian clients refused to work with her, and at one point she was provided a bodyguard for safety. In 1947, she enrolled in and attended classes for two years at the newly established Laredo Junior College. She cited the women who had influenced her as Marie Curie, Amelia Earhart, Carrie Nation, Frances Perkins, Eleanor Roosevelt, Helen Hayes, and Irene Dunne.

== League of United Latin American Citizens ==
In 1936, Montemayor helped to charter the women's division of Laredo LULAC, a group of approximately thirty members, most of whom were married homemakers, secretaries, and other workers; most had a high school education. A highly active group, the council encouraged women to vote and to have aspirations to work outside the home. They supported abused children, raised funds for the Laredo orphanage and flood victims, bought school supplies for poor children, and sponsored a column in Laredo's newspaper and in the published edition of LULAC news. Delegates also traveled to conventions and sponsored the Junior LULAC league. They worked independently of the men's LULAC council, not serving as an auxiliary.

We have always said and we still maintain that at the back of progress and success the ladies take a leading hand.
- Alice Dickerson Montemayor, on the Laredo Ladies LULAC.

In the local chapter, she would serve as the first secretary for most of 1936–1937 and president from 1938 to 1939. As secretary, she would report the chapter news to the LULAC News column "Around the Shield", which focused on local councils. In 1937 and 1938, she was one of two from the Laredo Ladies LULAC to attend regional conventions in Houston and El Paso. In Houston she was the only woman on a five-member finance committee, and in 1937 the majority male nominating committee named her to a national post. After April 1940, her name disappeared from LULAC News, ending her legacy with the organization.

=== Going national for LULAC ===
From 1937 until 1940, Montemayor held three national positions with LULAC: second national vice-president general, associate editor of LULAC News, and director general of Junior LULAC. The first national vice-president general was Fidencio Guerra of McAllen, Texas. After Montemayor held the position, and until it was abolished in 1970, women held the position, despite the roll never being gendered specifically for women. In this position, Montemayor promoted the establishment of more Ladies LULAC councils.

As associate editor of LULAC News she advocated for women. She penned an anonymous editorial called "Son Muy Hombres(?)", triggered by two sexist incidents. The first of the two incidents involved a male member of LULAC writing a high official stating, upon Montemayor becoming vice president, "I hope that President Ramon Longoria will get well soon. There are those of us who hate to be under a woman." The second incident took place under President Longoria as well. Three letters from the El Paso Ladies' LULAC seeking assistance were ignored, so the El Paso group left the league to avoid causing further drama. In the editorial, Montemayor stated: "My honest opinion of those who think in that line, is that they are cowardly and unfair, ignorant and narrow minded." She ended the editorial by asking any member of LULAC to write an article favoring the suppression of ladies councils or supporting the denial of giving them equal rights.

=== Supporting the Latino youth ===
In 1937, Mrs. Charles Ramirez of San Antonio's LULAC formed the idea for Junior LULAC and developed a resolution to create it. Ramirez co-organized the first group and in August 1938, Montemayor began a series of essays promoting the youth groups to senior councils. A local sponsor, she also continued to contribute to LULAC News, despite no longer serving as associate editor. She wrote the first charter for a youth chapter. In March 1937, she organized the second Junior council at her house; this chapter would go on to be the most active in LULAC. She recruited both boys and girls for the program, believing that starting young would help them "abandon the egotism and petty jealousies so common today among our ladies' and men's councils." Her son, Francisco Montemayor Jr., wrote in support of mixed groups, stating he disliked the idea of all-girl groups and rallied boys to prevent a majority of girls in the chapter. Montemayor believed that Junior LULAC provided leadership training necessary for youth to become good citizens and future LULAC senior members. The youth would learn debate and acting techniques, public service and expand on their educational skills like literacy.

== After LULAC ==
In 1937, Montemayor opened a dress shop that failed. She operated another dress shop between 1951 and 1956. In 1956, she served as substitute registrar for the Laredo Independent School District and would also work at Christen Middle School until 1972. Montemayor was active in her local church, Our Lady of Guadalupe Catholic Church. There she served as organist, a catechism teacher, and organized the first youth choir. At Our Lady of Guadalupe she received a pontifical blessing.

After retirement she worked as a folk artist. In 1973, she started raising gourds, which she then painted. By 1976, she was painting with acrylics on tin and masonite. The League of United Chicago Artists of Austin sponsored a solo exhibition of her work in August 1978 at Juarez–Lincoln University. She would go on to exhibit at Instituto Cultural Mexicano in November 1979, and in Chicago, Mission, Texas, and Riverside, California. The works, which she signed "Mom" or "Admonty," often depicted women, nature, and Mexican family life. Bright colors, as often seen in Mexican folk art, were her palette of choice and she also produced still lifes, landscape and portraits. Montemayor was one of a number of Texan women of Mexican descent to win notice as a folk artist; others included Beatrice Valdez Ximénez and Consuelo González Amezcua A children's reading text, Stories to Treasure/Cuentos para atesorar, documented some of her art.

In 1988, Montemayor was a focus of the 59th Annual LULAC Convention at the Smithsonian Institution. She died the next year and is interred at the Laredo Catholic Cemetery.

== Legacy ==
Her papers and archives are in the collection of the University of Texas at Austin, held within the university library's Benson Latin American Collection.

=== As a feminist ===
"Women wish to mother men just because it is their natural instinct and because they see into the men's helplessness."
- Alice Dickerson Montemayor

A prolific writer, Montemayor wrote more articles for LULAC than any other woman in its history. In her writing she stressed the importance of independent thinking for adults and youth. Her first essay was "We Need More Ladies Councils" where she called women to action to help reinvigorate inactive councils. She called her fellow female LULAC members "sisters", noting that at one annual convention there were seventy-one men's councils and fifteen women's councils, however, only twenty-six and four, respectively, attended. She believed that men engendered a competition between the councils based on allegations that the men were superior to women. However, Montemayor claimed women to be superior to men. She made public calls for women to join LULAC to empower themselves and help close the gender gap. She believed that women had common sense and were "able to see at a glance and penetrate into, in a second, what most men would not see with a searchlight or a telescope in an eternity." She believed women possessed a "super logic" and were more active in seeking the truth than men. She believed that LULAC would never fully flourish until women helped men. She supported women taking a lead in LULAC but also stressed the importance of women as caretakers of children.

Montemayor's involvement in LULAC was not without conflict. In 1937, conflict was noted in LULAC News, without little detail provided, about problems with the Laredo chapters. The Laredo LULAC men were described as not wanting the women's chapter to exist. Ezequiel D. Salinas, a state district court judge in Laredo and the president of LULAC from 1939 to 1940, reportedly hated Montemayor. According to Montemayor, Salinas and the local men's groups refused to vote for her at national conventions and questioned if their dislike was because of her as a person or because of her sex. Overall, Montemayor claimed that other men's groups and members were supportive of her work. She had strong business relationships with many well-traveled and college-educated men of LULAC.
