= Dr. Dennis D. Cantu Health Science Magnet School =

Public school in Texas, United States

Health Science Magnet School
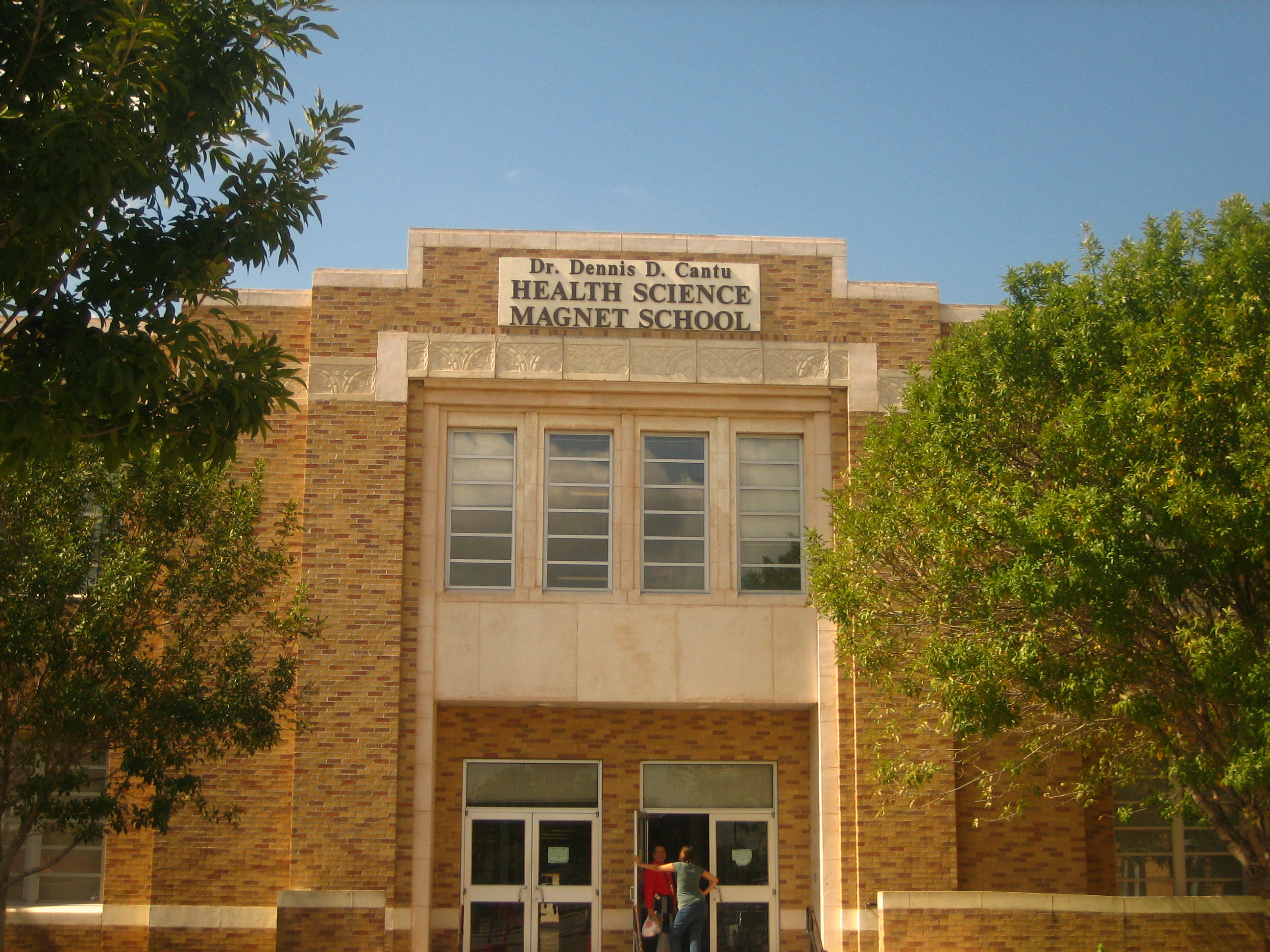

Location
- 2002 San Bernardo Avenue; Laredo, Texas 78040; United States; 27.518898°N 99.505182°W

Information
- Type: Public high school
- Director: Geraldina Arredondo
- Enrollment: 100+
- Website: hsms.elisd.org

Esther G. Buckley Early College High School, formerly named the Dr. Dennis D. Cantu Health Science Magnet School, is a public high school in Laredo, Texas that is part of Laredo Independent School District. The school is named after Esther G. Buckley, an alumna, and a member of the United States Commission on Civil Rights. The purpose of the school is to attract students interested in pursuing careers in the health sciences and to expose them to different careers in the medical field.

== Admissions ==
Middle school students are required to submit an application to become part of the magnet school. Selection criteria include:

1. Good Academic Standing/Attendance in all areas
2. Passing scores in TAKS examinations
3. Personal statement
4. 3 letters of recommendations

== Career Preparation ==
The school offers Pre-AP and AP (Advanced Placement) courses in Calculus, Biology, Chemistry, and specialized courses including medical microbiology, pathophysiology, anatomy & physiology, clinical nutrition, mental health, medical terminology, pharmacology, and Health Science Technology.

At the completion of the curriculum the students are eligible to sit for examinations to become Certified Nursing Assistants, Medical Office Assistants, and Emergency Medical Technicians. Students rotate at several local hospitals including Laredo Medical Center to gain proficiency in performing basic medical skills and complement classroom learning. College credits may also be earned through after-school college courses by Laredo Community College that are conducted in the school specifically for high school students; courses may include College Algebra, US Government, and US History. Some specialty courses such as Anatomy and Physiology may satisfy pre-requisite for nursing and other health science majors at Laredo Community College.

== Facilities ==
The school is housed in a single, free-standing within the Martin High School compound. There are approximately 9 classrooms, 2 laboratories, 1 stimulation room, a newly installed PITSCO lab, cafeteria/dining room, and administration office. The building also has solar panels which powers classroom computers.

== Name change ==
In 2025, Dr. Dennis D. Cantù college changed its name to Esther G. Buckley Early College High School, a decision made by the LISD board of trustees.
