= J. C. Martin =

J. C. Martin may refer to:

- J. C. Martin (baseball), Major League Baseball player
- J. C. Martin (Texas politician), mayor of Laredo, Texas
