= Jessica Cisneros =

American politician (born 1993)

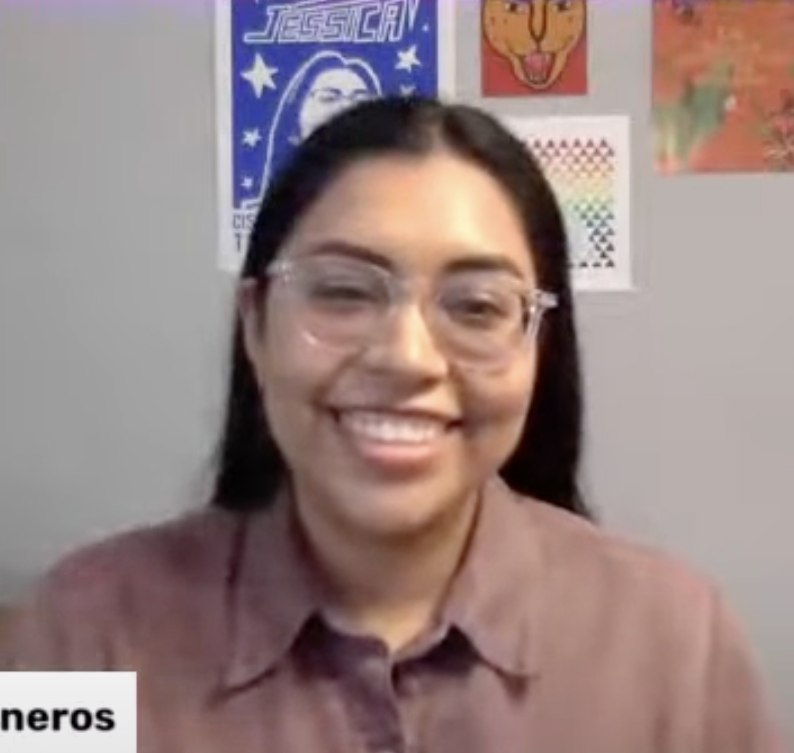
- Cisneros in 2022

Personal details
- Born: May 24, 1993 (age 32); Laredo, Texas, U.S.
- Political party: Democratic
- Education: University of Texas at Austin (BA, JD)

Jessica Cisneros (born May 24, 1993) is an American attorney and a former Democratic candidate for Texas's 28th congressional district in 2020 and 2022.

== Early life and education ==
Cisneros was born and raised in Laredo, Texas. Before she was born, her parents emigrated from Mexico to seek medical care for her older sister. Her parents became United States citizens under the Immigration Reform and Control Act of 1986.

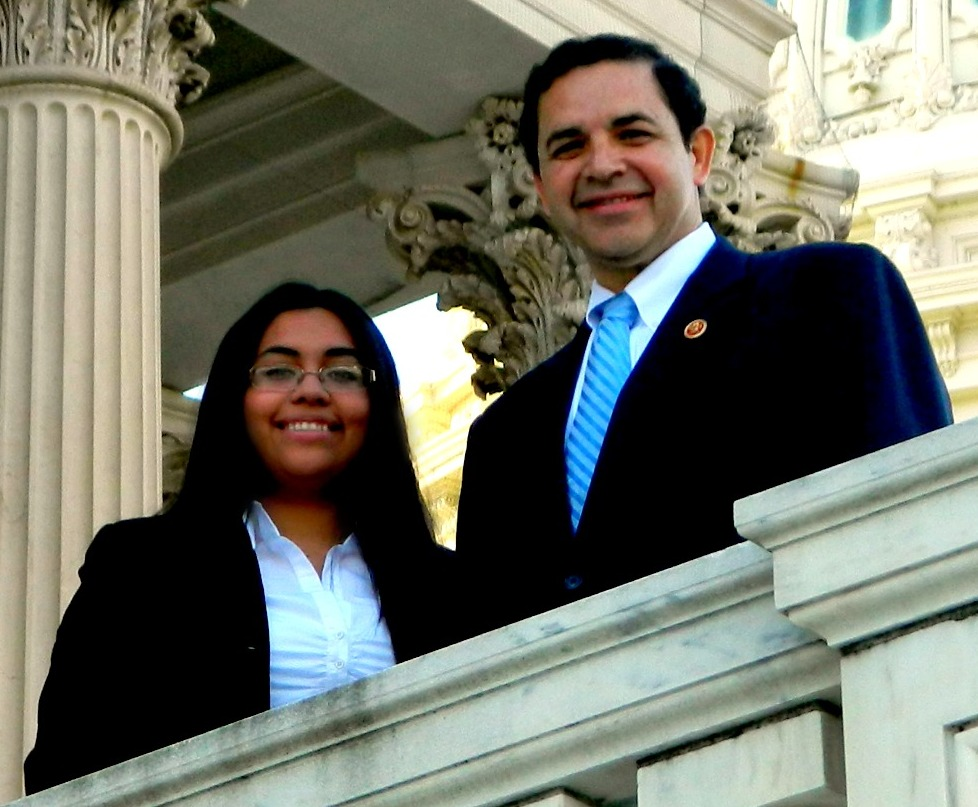
Cisneros with U.S. Representative Henry Cuellar in 2013 during her internship in his office

Cisneros was the valedictorian of her graduating class at Early College High School. She earned a Bachelor of Arts from the University of Texas at Austin and a Juris Doctor from the University of Texas School of Law. Her focus during law school included immigration law. In 2014, while a student at the University of Texas, she worked as an intern in the Washington, D.C. office of Congressman Henry Cuellar, after developing an interest in immigration law reform. She is Latina.

== Career ==
After graduating from law school, Cisneros worked as an attorney, including at Brooklyn Defender Services with a focus on immigration law. Her law practice has included advocacy for clients seeking asylum. Cisneros entered politics after she was proposed by Laredo community leaders in response to a local newspaper advertisement by the Justice Democrats seeking candidates for political office. After the 2020 election, she worked as an attorney in the Laredo office of Texas RioGrande Legal Aid and became a supervising attorney at RAICES in Laredo, a legal aid organization for immigrants.

=== 2020 U.S. House of Representatives election ===
In 2020, Cisneros was a Democratic candidate for the U.S. House of Representatives in Texas's 28th congressional district against Henry Cuellar, the incumbent since 2005. If elected, Cisneros would have been the youngest woman elected to Congress. During her campaign, she promoted progressive policies such as single-payer healthcare and raising the federal minimum wage to $15 per hour. She also criticized Cuellar's voting record as too conservative, noting in particular his views on abortion rights and his campaign donations from the private prison industry, especially in light of the controversial migrant detention facilities operated at the border by the Trump administration. She was endorsed by progressive groups Brand New Congress and Justice Democrats. Cisneros lost to Cuellar in the March 2020 primary by 1700 votes.

=== 2022 U.S. House of Representatives election ===
In August 2021, Cisneros announced she would challenge Cuellar in the 2022 Democratic primary, and faced Cuellar in the primary on March 1, 2022. Cisneros continued to campaign on economic issues and access to health care. She was endorsed again by the Justice Democrats, U.S. Senators Bernie Sanders and Elizabeth Warren, and the abortion rights advocacy groups NARAL Pro-Choice America and EMILY's List. She was also supported by labor unions, the Texas AFL–CIO, the Latino Victory Fund, and Rep. Alexandria Ocasio-Cortez. After the March 1 primary, Cuellar led in the results, but with less than fifty percent of the primary vote, so Cisneros and Cuellar competed in a runoff on May 24.

On May 2, Politico published a leaked draft majority opinion written by U.S. Supreme Court justice Samuel Alito to overturn Roe v. Wade and Planned Parenthood v. Casey. Before the draft opinion was leaked, NARAL Pro-Choice America announced further support for her campaign, including advertising and organizing efforts. On May 4, Cisneros released a statement calling on Democratic Party leadership to withdraw their support from Cuellar. On May 4, House Speaker Nancy Pelosi and House Majority Whip Jim Clyburn continued to express support for Cuellar, and Pelosi continued to do so on May 12, and recorded robocalls supporting Cuellar. According to Federal Election Commission reports released in May 2022, Cisneros raised $1.2 million between April 1 and May 4, while Cuellar raised $352,000 during the same time period, with a total of $4.5 million raised by Cisneros and $3.1 million by Cuellar. On May 13, Women Vote!, the super PAC affiliated with EMILY's List, purchased $526,000 in ads to support Cisneros, and EMILY's List president Laphonza Butler made a statement criticizing Cuellar's views on abortion. On May 19, Rep. Pramila Jayapal endorsed Cisneros, stating "we must elect pro-choice candidates".

On June 3, the May 24 primary runoff count concluded with Cuellar holding a lead by 281 votes. On June 7, the race remained uncalled by the Associated Press and CBS News, and Cisneros filed a recount petition. In 2004, when a 145-vote deficit for Cuellar led to a recount and resulted in a Cuellar win, Cuellar stated, "Until every eligible vote is accurately counted, the voters cannot be certain of the outcome of this election"; in 2022, Cisneros stated, "With just under 0.6 percent of the vote symbolizing such stark differences for the future in South Texas, I owe it to our community to see this through to the end." On June 21, after the recount concluded, the Associated Press called the race for Cuellar based on his 289-vote lead, and Cisneros conceded the race.

== Electoral history ==
2020 U.S. House Democratic primary in Texas's 28th district
Party	Candidate	Votes	%
Democratic	Henry Cuellar (incumbent)	38,834	51.79%
Democratic	Jessica Cisneros	36,144	48.21%
Total votes		74,978	100.00%

2022 U.S. House Democratic primary in Texas's 28th district, March 2, 2022
Party	Candidate	Votes	%
Democratic	Henry Cuellar (incumbent)	23,552	48.4%
Democratic	Jessica Cisneros	22,785	46.9%
Democratic	Tannya Judith Benavides	2,289	4.7%
Total votes		48,626	100.00%

2022 U.S. House Democratic primary runoff in Texas's 28th district
Party	Candidate	Votes	%
Democratic	Henry Cuellar (incumbent)	22,901	50.32%
Democratic	Jessica Cisneros	22,612	49.68%
Total votes		45,513	100.00%
