= J. W. Nixon High School =

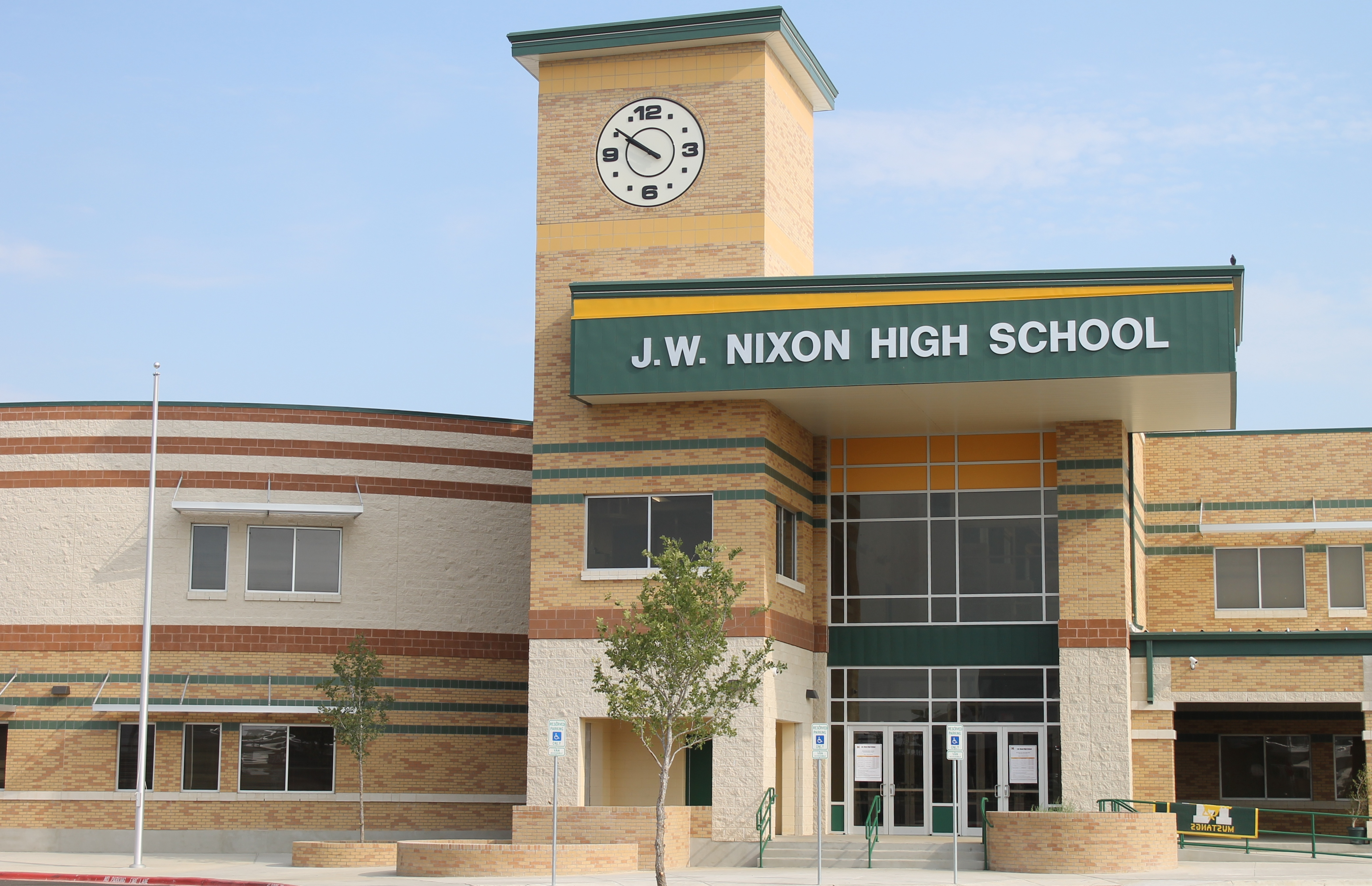

Location
- 2000 Plum Street; Laredo, Texas, 78043; United States

Information
- Type: Public
- Motto: "Forever Green and Gold"
- Established: 1964
- School district: Laredo Independent School District
- Superintendent: Guillermo Pro
- Principal: Rogelio J. Garcia
- Teaching staff: 153.74 (FTE)
- Grades: 9-12
- Enrollment: 2,124 (2024–2025)
- Student to teacher ratio: 13.82
- Colors: Green and Gold
- Mascot: Mustang
- Rival: Martin High School
- Newspaper: The Pony Express
- Website: nixonhs.elisd.org

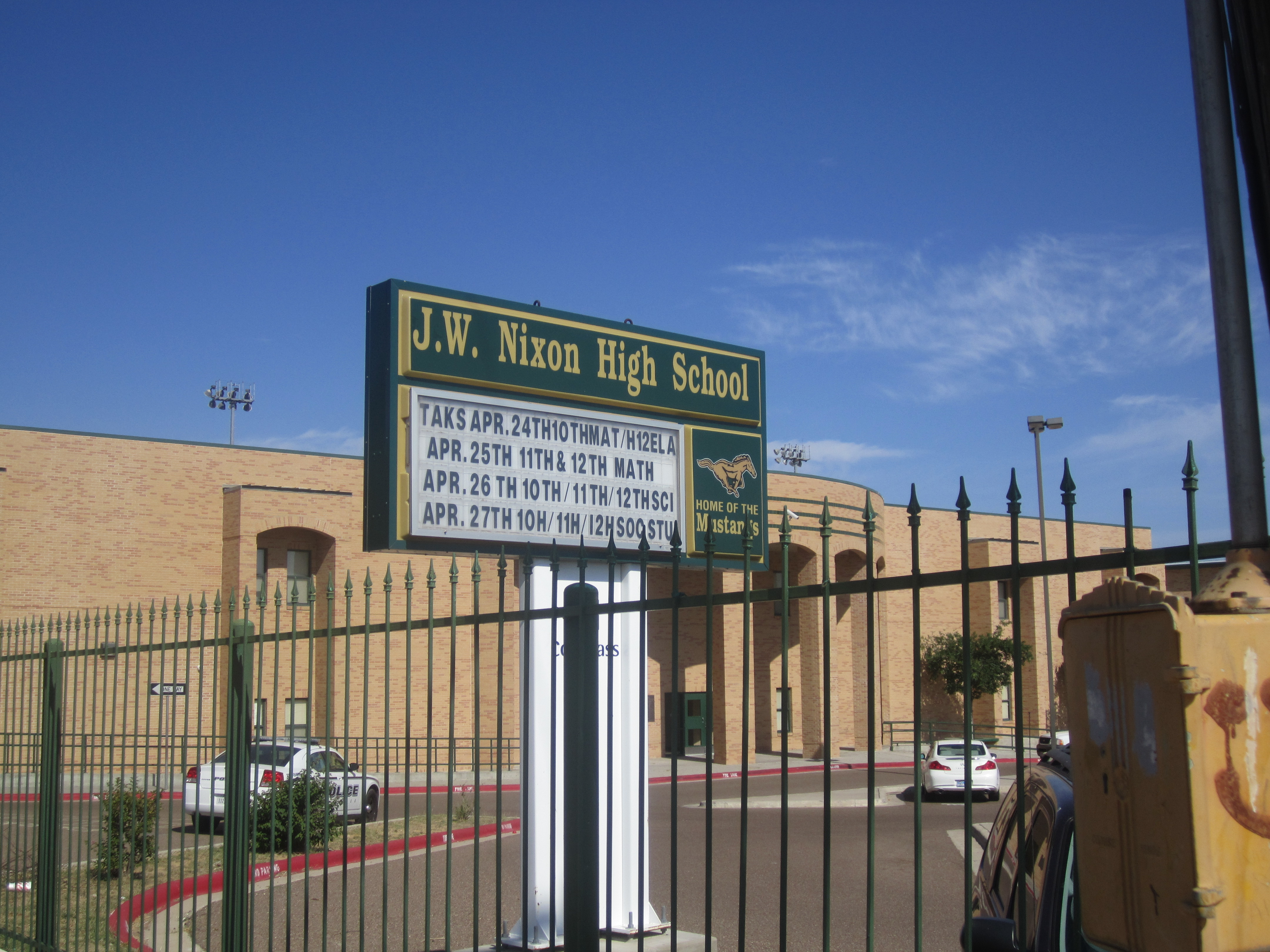
Previous J. W. Nixon High School campus design.

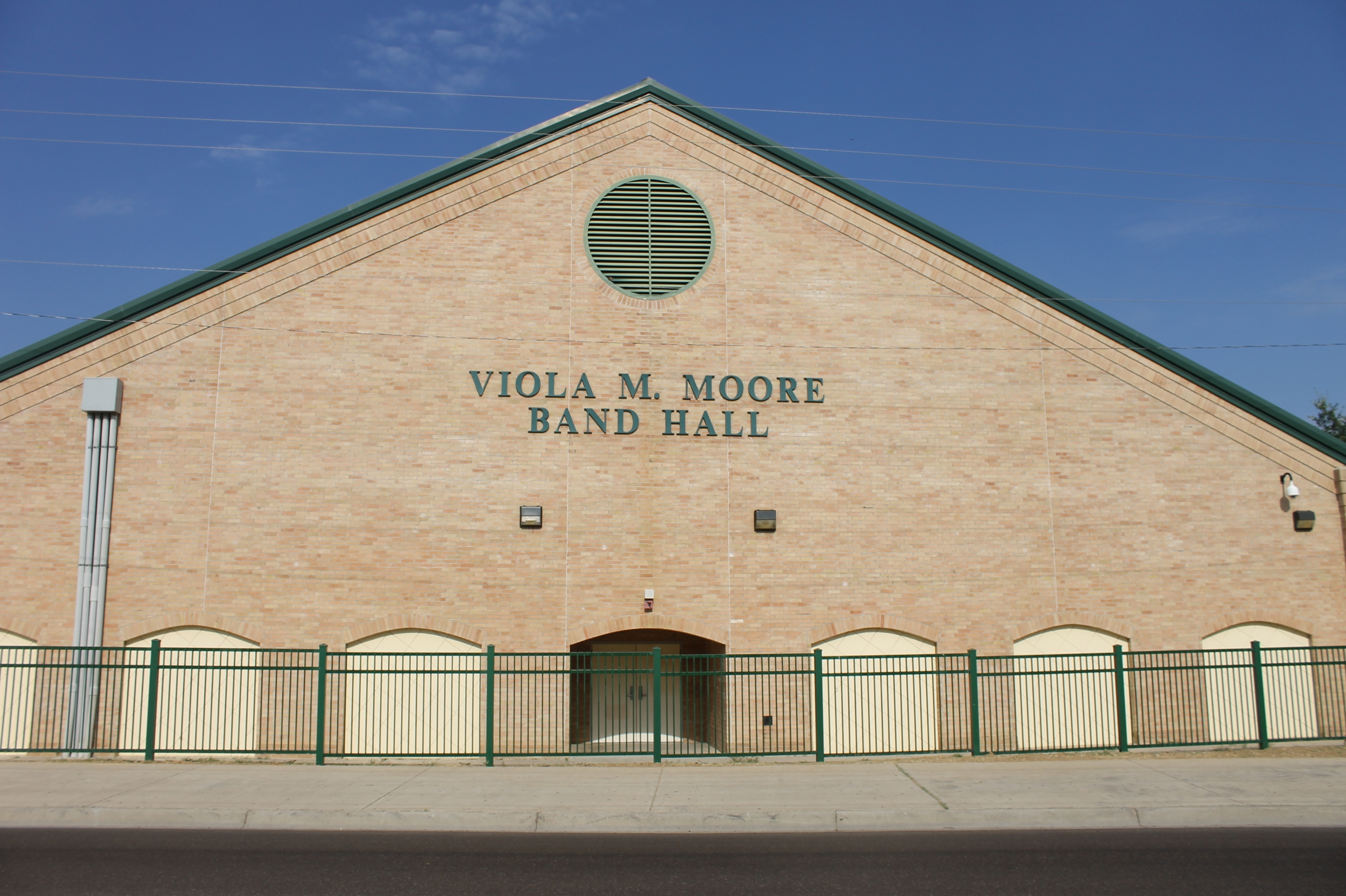
Viola M. Moore Band Hall is named after a former J. W. Nixon principal.

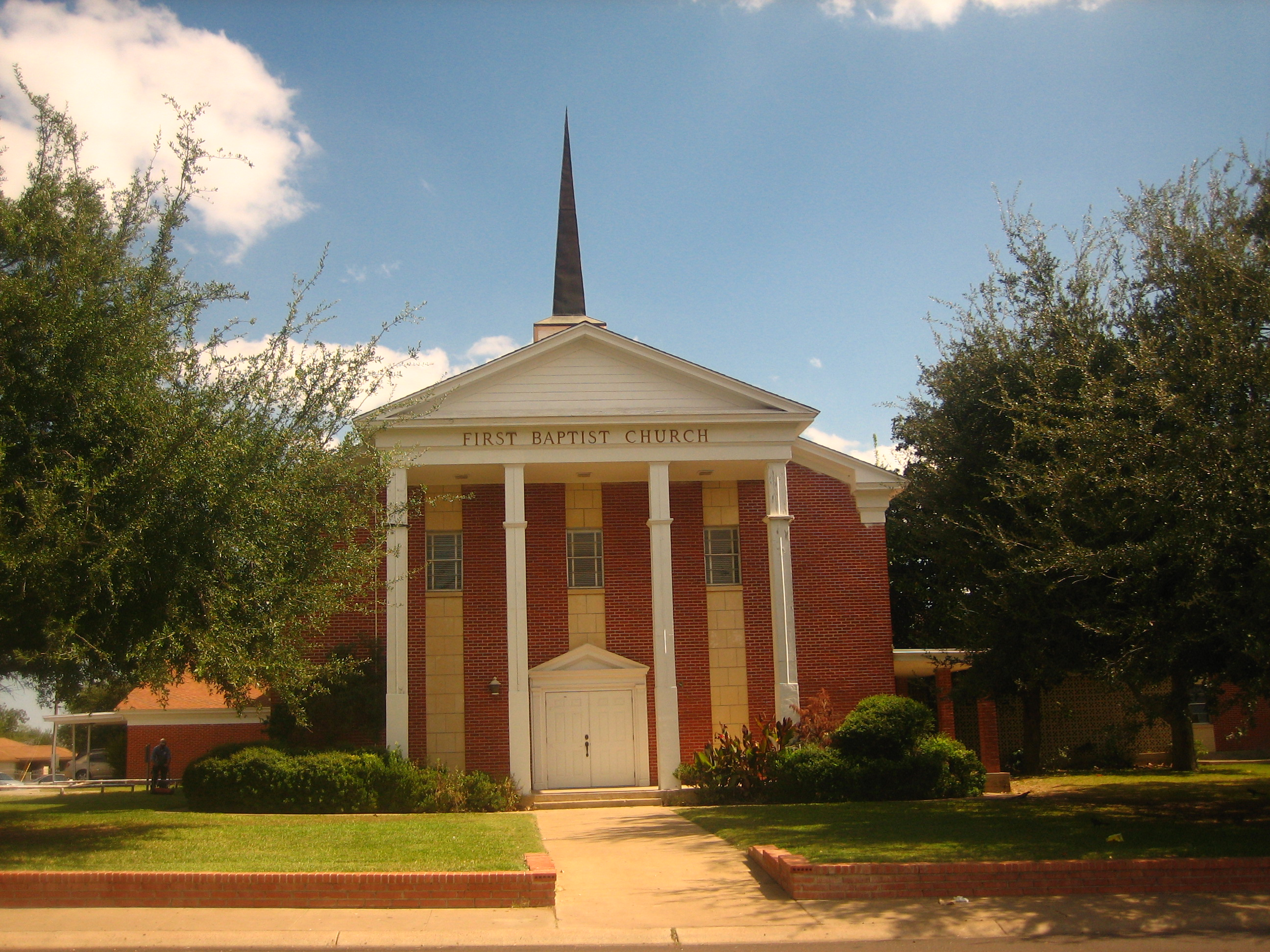
The former First Baptist Church building in Laredo, since razed, was acquired in 2004 as part of the J. W. Nixon campus; the site is now the location of the Vidal M. Treviño School of Communications and Fine Arts.

Joseph W. Nixon High School is a public high school located in South Texas, United States. It was built in 1964 as the second high school in Laredo, Texas. The original high school in Laredo was Raymond & Tirza Martin High School, previously known as Laredo High School. Both are part of the Laredo Independent School District (LISD).

Over a period of two years (2014-2015), J. W. Nixon underwent a $40 million renovation. Several older campus buildings were demolished to create a reconfigured two-story building centered around a U-shaped courtyard. Funds for the project were mostly derived from a construction bond package approved by voters. As of 2016, J. W. Nixon has new complexes for tennis and track and field, along with new classrooms.

== History ==
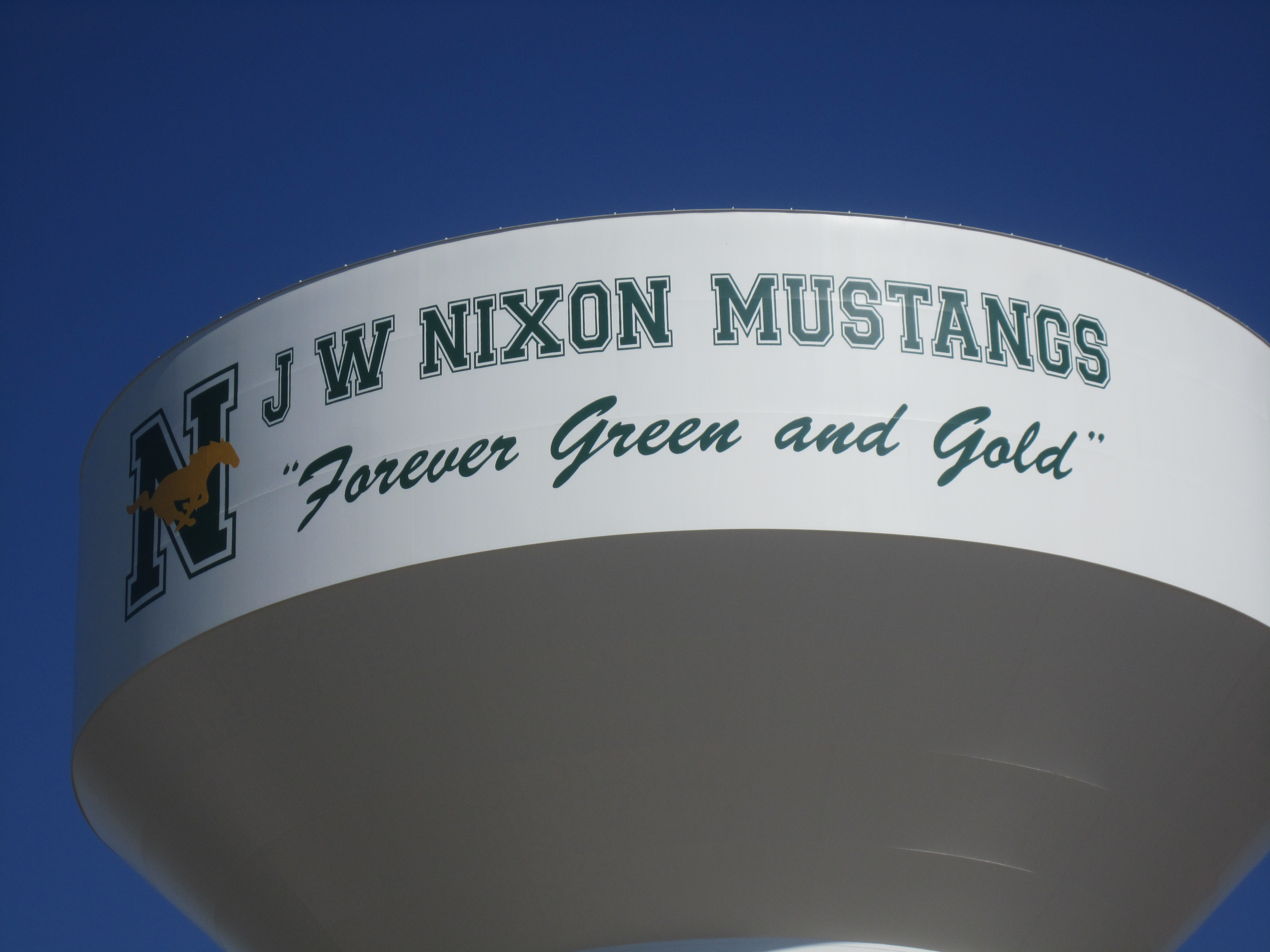

J. W. Nixon is named for a former LISD superintendent. It opened its doors in September 1964, with W. E. Lockey serving as Nixon's first principal. The first class to graduate was the Class of 1965. Initially, J.W. Nixon served as a junior high/high school with grades seven through twelve. The original school property consisted of 20 acres (81,000 m^{2}) and the cost of construction was $151,047,568. In 2007 J.W. Nixon had a record breaking number of more than 400 students graduating.

About 2 a.m. on December 7, 2012, arsonists torched three portable buildings at Nixon High School. Three other classrooms sustained smoke damage. No individuals were physically harmed in the fire.

In 2014, Nixon fell short on minimum state standards and were placed on the Public Education Grant list.

Viola Ileana Martinez Moore (1929-2017), born in Zapata and a graduate of Martin High School in Laredo, was a subsequent principal of J. W. Nixon, the first Hispanic woman to head a 5-A high school in Texas. The J. W. Nixon Band Hall is named in her honor. After regular retirement, she served for two terms as a trustee of the Laredo Independent School District and as principal of the Roman Catholic Blessed Sacrament Elementary School in Laredo. Her obituary describes her as one of "no limitations, a goal-getter, a catcher of dreams, and the best example for our community as a whole."

Among the original J. W. Nixon faculty is Cecilia Cantu. Another member, Laura Garcia Magnon (died 2012), retired after forty-five years of continuous service to J. W. Nixon. The Nixon science building is named in her honor.

In 2015, Pedro "Pete" Solis of Nixon High School was named "Texas Coach of the Year" for Class 5A by the Texas Association of Basketball Coaches.

== Rivalry ==
The Nixon-Martin High annual football game is known as the oldest and most popular school rivalry game in the city.

Each year both teams face in this border city classic. The game is usually played in November.

year	winner	score
1974-75		
1975-76		
1976-77		
1977-78		
1978-79		
1979-80		
1980-81		
1981-82		
1982-83		
1983-84		
1984-85		
1985-86		
1986-87		
1987-88		
1988-89		
1989-90		
1990-91		
1991-92		
1992-93		
1993-94		
1994-95		
1995-96		
1996-97	Nixon	
1997-98		
1998-99		
1999-00	Nixon	
2000-01		
2001-02		
2002-03	Nixon	
2003-04	Nixon	
2004-05	Nixon	44-13
2005-06	Nixon	43-0
2006-07	Nixon	19-14
2007-08	Nixon	
2008-09	Martin	
2009-10	Martin	35-26
2010-11	Martin	27-14
2011-12	Nixon	
2012-13	Nixon	
2013-14	Martin	
2014-15	Martin	
2015-16	Nixon	
2016-17	Nixon	
2017-18	Nixon	
2018-19	Nixon	
2019-20	Nixon	33-30
2020-21		
2021-22	Nixon	28-13
2022-23	Martin	
2023-24	Martin	28-27
2024	Nixon	

== Notable alumni ==
- Diana Fuentes - Journalist and press freedom advocate
- Pete Astudillo (class of 1982) - Tejano singer and former member of Selena y Los Dinos
- Freddie Benavides - Professional baseball player, interim manager of the Cincinnati Reds
- Dr. Francisco G. Cigarroa - former President of University of Texas at San Antonio Science Center and current Chancellor of the University of Texas System
- Henry Cuellar - United States Representative (28th District)
- Elma Salinas Ender - retired 341st District Court judge; first Hispanic woman to serve on a district court in Texas
- Sebastian Ligarde - Mexican Actor
