= Lara FS Academy =

Francisco S. Lara Academy

Location
- 2901 East Travis Street; Laredo, Texas 78043; United States
- Coordinates: 27.529102°N 99.466248°W

Information
- Type: Public
- School district: Laredo Independent School District
- Principal: Armando Molina
- Grades: 6-12
- Enrollment: 93 (2014-15)
- Color(s)
- Mascot: Ranger
- Website: fslara.elisd.org

Lara FS Academy is a discipline alternative school for at-risk students in Laredo Independent School District, located in central Laredo, Texas.
