= Consuelo González Amezcua =

Mexican/ Texan folk artist

Consuelo (Chelo) González Amezcua
- Born: June 13, 1903; Piedras Negras, Mexico
- Died: June 23, 1975 (aged 72); Del Rio, Texas, US
- Known for: Drawing
- Movement: Folk Art, Outsider art

Consuelo González Amezcua, known as Chelo or Chelito, (June 13, 1903 – June 23, 1975) was an American outsider artist of Mexican birth. She was one of a number of Texan women of Mexican descent, including Beatrice Valdez Ximénez and Alicia Dickerson Montemayor, to gain notice as a folk artist.

== Life ==
Born in Piedras Negras, Coahuila, González was the third of the six children of Jesús González Galván and Julia Amezcua Saenz. She had four brothers, and a sister, Zaré, to whom she was especially close. The family immigrated to Del Rio, Texas in 1913. González received only six years of formal schooling, even though both of her parents were teachers. She wished to study art, and applied to Lázaro Cárdenas for a scholarship to the Academy of San Carlos. This was granted, but three days later her father, Jesús González, died, and González never attended the school. As a result she lived in Del Rio for the rest of her life, selling candy at the local S. H. Kress store and, after the death of her mother, living with her sister in the family home; González never married. During summers she would travel in Mexico, gaining artistic inspiration. She developed a reputation as an eccentric in her hometown, often giving performances at which she would sing, dance, or read poetry. Later in life, González recalled that her art received little attention from her family, and she said that her sister expressed little interest in her poetry. González died in Del Rio, and is buried in its Sacred Heart Cemetery.

== Work ==
González is best known for her "filigree art", which took the hallmark intricate metalwork of traditional Mexican jewelry as its inspiration. Her first attempts at creating art involved carving shell stone from the Pecos River into elaborate designs, a practice which she began in 1956. Eight years later she turned to drawing, using a ballpoint pen on paper or cardboard. Early drawings were in black on a white ground, sometimes with red, blue, or green ink added. During the last five years of her life she incorporated crayons and felt-tip pens into her collection of tools, often using many more colors than before. She quite strongly believed that her inspiration was divine, and she incorporated many Biblical themes into her work, which were always carefully planned out prior to execution. Otherwise her subjects were drawn largely from pre-Columbian history, and her art reflects her heritage as an American of Mexican birth. González also wrote poetry, some of which she incorporated into her drawings. She also compiled a book of verse, Cantares y Poemas. Her poems won prizes in Mexico, but her drawings remained unknown until a 1968 exhibition at the Marion Koogler McNay Art Museum. The 1968 exhibition led to others, both in the United States and in Mexico.

== Collections and exhibits ==
Several of her drawings are in the collection of the Smithsonian American Art Museum. Several of her works were sent on a two-year tour of Texas sometime after her death.
