= Elma Salinas Ender =

American judge (born 1953)

Judge of the 341st Judicial District of Texas
- In office August 31, 1983 – December 31, 2012
- Appointed by: Mark White
- Preceded by: Position established
- Succeeded by: Beckie Palomo

Personal details
- Born: Elma Teresa Salinas; August 11, 1953 (age 72) Laredo, Texas, U.S.
- Party: Democratic
- Spouse: David Allen Ender (m. 1986)
- Children: 2
- Education: J. W. Nixon High School; University of Texas at Austin; St. Mary's University School of Law
- Ender is the first Hispanic woman to serve as a judge on a state district court in Texas.

Elma Teresa Ender (née Salinas; born August 11, 1953) is an American attorney. She was the youngest woman and the first Hispanic female to serve as a state district court judge in the U.S. state of Texas.

In 1983, she was appointed by then Governor Mark Wells White as the first judge of the then newly established 341st Judicial District, based in her native Laredo. Salinas served for twenty-nine years in the judicial position prior to her retirement, announced in 2011 and effective on December 31, 2012. She set a record for longevity among the four Webb County justices serving in recent decades on the state courts, Districts 49, 111, 341, and 406, numbered in order of creation by the Texas Legislature.

== Background ==
Ender is the youngest of three children of Oscar David Salinas, Sr. (1924-1997), and the former Elma Lopez (1922-2016), a native of Hebbronville, Texas, who was employed for many years by the Webb County tax assessor's office. Judge Ender's two brothers are Oscar David Salinas Jr. and Juan Alberto Salinas.

Ender graduated in 1970 from J. W. Nixon High School in Laredo. In 1974, she received her undergraduate degree in accounting and Spanish from the University of Texas at Austin. She obtained her Juris Doctor in 1978 from St. Mary's University School of Law in San Antonio.

== Court service ==
Ender said she had no idea she would be the first Hispanic woman state district court judge in Texas history. "One thing about Mark White that some people may not remember is that he was very careful to appoint a percentage of individuals to commissions or to courts that reflected the population of Texas", she recalled.

Her judicial duties initially included juvenile law, the appeals of which go directly to the Texas Supreme Court. Since her tenure on the court began, she has observed an explosion in both juvenile and child-abuse cases in Webb County. She urged support in the 1990s for legislation sponsored by Lieutenant Governor Bob Bullock, which called for reduced class sizes in public schools and testing for learning disabilities. Ender was among civic and political figures in Laredo who fought for the establishment of the four-year Texas A&M International University, located off the interstate loop named for Bullock.

In 1984, Ender was elected to her first four-year term on the court. She was reelected without opposition in 1988, 1992, 1996, 2000, 2004, and 2008. She served as the administrative judge for the Webb County district court judges. Ender did not seek an eighth term in the Democratic primary election held on May 29, 2012. Instead, another Hispanic woman, Beckie Palomo of Laredo, was tapped by voters for the 341st Judicial District. Palomo faced no Republican opposition in the general election held on November 6, 2012 in the overwhelmingly Democratic county.

In 2011, Judge Ender forbade the family of murder defendant Joseph Allen Garcia from observing the jury selection process in the case. She cited the fire code and the lack of available space in the courtroom in making her determination. Garcia was tried and convicted in the 2003 drive-by killing in Laredo of Mario Alberto Gonzalez. Garcia, who maintains that he never committed the crime, was sixteen years old at the time of the arrest. He posted bond in the amount of $1.25 million and promptly fled to Mexico.

Garcia was named to the U.S. Marshal's "15 Most Wanted List". The case was carried by John Walsh's television series, America's Most Wanted. After seven years, Garcia was re-arrested in 2010 and immediately extradited to the United States. Garcia ultimately received seventy years imprisonment, which he began serving in the state prison in Beeville.

In 2013, after Ender had retired from the bench, the Texas Fourth Court of Appeals in San Antonio determined that she violated Garcia's rights under the Sixth Amendment to the United States Constitution by barring his family from observing jury deliberations. The appeals court ordered a new trial at the district court level on grounds that Judge Ender failed to make proper accommodations for the Garcia family so they could observe the deliberations. Otherwise, the appeals court said that the trial had elements of a "private" event, rather than a fully public proceeding.

== Personal life ==
Ender's husband, David Allen Ender (born 1952), is the son of Otto and Ottilia (née Novak) Ender of Karnes City, Texas. He married Elma Salinas in 1986. They have two daughters.

Rotary International named Ender a Paul Harris Fellow in 2002. Judge Ender was honored as "Laredoan of the Year" in 2012 by the Laredo Morning Times.

== See also ==
- List of Hispanic and Latino American jurists

Political offices
Preceded by New position	Judge of the 341st Judicial District of Texas; 1983–2012	Succeeded by Beckie Palomo
