= Esther Buckley =

American educator and politician (1948–2013)

Esther Gonzalez-Arroyo Buckley

Member of the United States Commission on Civil Rights
- In office December 1983 – December 1992
- Succeeded by: Constance Horner

Personal details
- Born: March 29, 1948 Laredo, Webb County, Texas, U.S.
- Died: February 11, 2013 (aged 64) Webb County, Texas, U.S.
- Party: Republican
- Spouse: Elmer Buckley (b. 1934 - d. 2009)
- Children: 7
- Parent(s): Hector and Amalia Gonzalez-Arroyo, Sr.
- Education: University of Texas at Austin; Texas A&M International University
- Occupation: Educator

Esther Gonzalez-Arroyo Buckley (March 29, 1948 – February 11, 2013) was an educator in Laredo, Texas, USA, who from 1983 to 1992 was one of the eight members of the United States Commission on Civil Rights. She was appointed to the board by U.S. President Ronald W. Reagan.

== Background ==
Of Hispanic descent, Buckley was born in Laredo in south Texas to Hector Gonzalez-Arroyo, Sr., and the former Amalia Margarita Ayala. A rapid learner as a child, she graduated in 1963, at the age of fifteen, as salutatorian of Martin High School in Laredo. She completed her studies three years ahead of the classmates with whom she had entered the first grade in the fall of 1954. At the time of her death at the age of sixty-four, she held her fifth school teaching assignment through the Laredo Independent School District. After graduation from Martin High School, she attended Laredo Community College and subsequently pursued an undergraduate degree from the University of Texas at Austin, with concentration in biology and mathematics. At the time of her death, she was working on a doctorate in multicultural education and information technology from Texas A&M University in College Station.

Buckley received much recognition during her forty-two years in professional education. She was a member of the Association of Texas Professional Educators and the secretary in the regional office for that group. The day after Buckley's death, the Texas Senate adjourned in her honor. Buckley's most recent assignment was as science instructor at the Dr. Dennis D. Cantu Health Science Center at her alma mater, Martin High School. In 1989, she was chosen as the "Top Texas High School Physics Teacher" at the centennial celebration of the American Physical Society. In 2010, Buckley was a finalist in the "Best in Texas Education" award from H-E-B Foods. She received the "One Class at a Time" award from the Laredo Federal Credit Union. From 2003 to 2006, she was local president of another professional organization for educators, Phi Delta Kappa.

== Political activities ==
A former chairman of the Republican Party in her native Webb County, Buckley served on the Governor's Commission on Women and the Texas Hispanic Advisory Practices and Ethics Commission under appointment from Republican Governor Bill Clements. It was through the appointments from Clements that Buckley caught the notice of President Reagan. Buckley was considered a conservative member in general agreement with Reagan's social policies while she served on the commission, an advisory and investigatory board originally established through the Civil Rights Act of 1957. She had no direct experience in dealing with civil rights issues, opposed the defeated Equal Rights Amendment to the United States Constitution and objected to school busing, quotas, and affirmative action as proper methods to level the playing field for minorities in competition with whites in matters of education and employment.

Buckley served under three chairmen, all African Americans: the strongly conservative Clarence M. Pendleton, Jr., from San Diego, California, and after his death, William B. Allen, and, finally, Arthur Fletcher, a liberal Republican allied with President George Herbert Walker Bush. During Buckley's 9-year tenure, President Reagan had tried without success to remove Democratic commissioner Mary Frances Berry, an African American professor who challenged the president in court in a bid to maintain what she claimed to be the survival of the independence of the board from executive branch control. Berry not only survived Reagan's opposition but also served as the commission chairman thereafter during the administration of President Bill Clinton.

Buckley was replaced on the commission in December 1992, when in his last days in office President Bush tapped another Republican woman, Constance Horner, a former chairman of the United States Civil Service Commission, to fill the position. The Commission on Civil Rights consists of four appointees of the President and two each from the United States House of Representatives and the U.S. Senate. Formerly, the president had appointed all eight members, who then required confirmation from the Senate.

In 1995, Laredo Mayor Saul N. Ramirez, Jr., a Democrat in a nonpartisan position, named Buckley as a charter member of the Laredo Commission for Women. Her service on the Webb County Commission on Higher Education led to the establishment of a four-year degree-granting public institution now known as Texas A&M International University, from which she received a Master of Science degree in 1975. She was a board member of her local Battered Women's Shelter.

Buckley's husband, Elmer Buckley (1932–2009), was a native of Maysville, Kentucky, whom she had met while living in Dallas, Texas. He was an aide to former Laredo Mayor Aldo Tatangelo during Tatangelo's first term in office from 1978 to 1982. Elmer Buckley served in the United States Marine Corps during the Korean War. During the administration of President Gerald R. Ford, Jr., he worked to organize the South Texas Economic Development Office and was vice-chairman of the South Texas Workforce Development Board. He was active in Republican political campaigns for Governor Clements, U.S. Senators John Tower, Phil Gramm, and Kay Bailey Hutchison, and U.S. Presidents Ford, Reagan, and the two Bushes. Elmer Buckley was preceded in death by his first wife, Barbara Buckley, and one son. When Aldo Tatangelo ran unsuccessfully for county judge in the 1990 general election as a write-in candidate, Esther Buckley sent letters to Republican voters urging them to support Tatangelo.

As Republican chairman in Laredo, Esther Buckley was an ex officio member of the Webb County Election Board through which she lobbied steadily for the sanctity of the ballot. According to Martha Cigarro de Llano of the Laredo law firm of Person, Whitworth, Borchers, and Morales, Buckley

was involved in local elections for decades in almost every capacity: a volunteer for candidates, the qualifying and counting of votes, numerous recounts petitioned by candidates or ordered by state district court judges, and in ensuring that every vote was counted in a transparent manner, giving effect to every voter's ballot. She worked very long, grueling hours alongside election officials, candidates, volunteers, and others in a patient yet firm, demanding manner.

To her, every vote mattered, every vote had to be counted, and every voter had to be assured that the time and effort taken to cast his/her vote was meaningful and most important that his/her vote was accurately counted. I can attest to her dedication and love towards the election process in this community in a matter which was always respectful and professional.

As a woman, Mrs. Buckley was a trailblazer and a transformational figure. Those who were lucky enough to work with her or to be taught by her know that this is true. She will always be remembered for her incredible, meaningful life and will be missed ....

== Death ==
Buckley was killed in a two-vehicle accident in Webb County fifteen miles north of Laredo. She was the passenger in a 2007 Dodge minivan driven by her son, James Joseph Buckley (born c. 1971), an English teacher at the Vidal M. Trevino School of Communication and Fine Arts within LISD in downtown Laredo. The Buckleys had been in Austin that day lobbying state legislators for the restoration of $5.4 billion in school funding earlier cut to balance the state budget. They had visited in the office of District 21 State Senator Judith Zaffirini, a Democrat who chairs the Senate Committee on Government Organization and as the former chairman of the Senate Higher Education Committee remains active in the education field.

On the return trip from Austin to Laredo at the intersection of Interstate 35 and the Columbia Toll Road they were struck by a 2007 Mack bobtail tractor headed east on Texas Highway 255. The truck driver, Rene Gutierrez Elizondo (born c. 1966) of Laredo, escaped the crash with minor lacerations and bruises. James Buckley sustained a broken forearm and bruising and was taken to Brooke Army Medical Center in San Antonio.

Services for Buckley were held at Holy Redeemer Catholic Church in Laredo. Like her husband, who preceded her in death by more than three years, she was cremated. In addition to her son, James Joseph Buckley, who underwent surgery for his wounds at the time of his mother's funeral, Buckley was survived by six other children, Trina Elaine Bratton and husband Nathan, Catherine Elizabeth Buckley, United States Army Staff Sgt. Christopher Edmund Buckley and wife Leah, Rebecca A. Buckley, D.V.M., George A. Buckley, and Jennifer Esther Buckley. Mrs. Buckley also had a brother, Hector Gonzalez-Arroyo, Jr., of Laredo.

== Legacy ==
In her obituary printed in the Laredo Morning Times, Buckley recalled, "From my earliest memories as a child, I have always been a teacher. I remember experiences in the second grade where I used to help other students with their assignments when they did not understand their lessons. I have been teaching for more than forty years. ... As long as I can, I will be useful to my community and its advancement."

Buckley said that her purpose in life was to teach with intensity and strength because it was God's will that she do so, even though she was well past eligibility for teacher retirement. Her connection to the Republican Party, she said was an outgrowth of her religious philosophies and family upbringing.

Days after her death, Texas A&M International University established a special memorial scholarship in Buckley's name. She earned her master's degree from the institution when it was known as Laredo State University. TAMIU President Ray Keck said, "We thought it would be a fitting way to honor a remarkable educator and, in turn, help to make an important difference in the lives of other students seeking to complete their higher education at TAMIU."

On March 28, 2014, Buckley was posthumously honored with inclusion into the Martin High School "Tiger Legends". The Association of Texas Professional Educators recognized Buckley with an honorary resolution during its 2013 House of Delegates meeting.

In 2025, Buckley was honored again when trustees of the Laredo Independent School District voted to name its Early College High School at Raymond and Tirza Martin High School in Buckley's honor.
