= Freddie Benavides =

American baseball player and coach (born 1966)

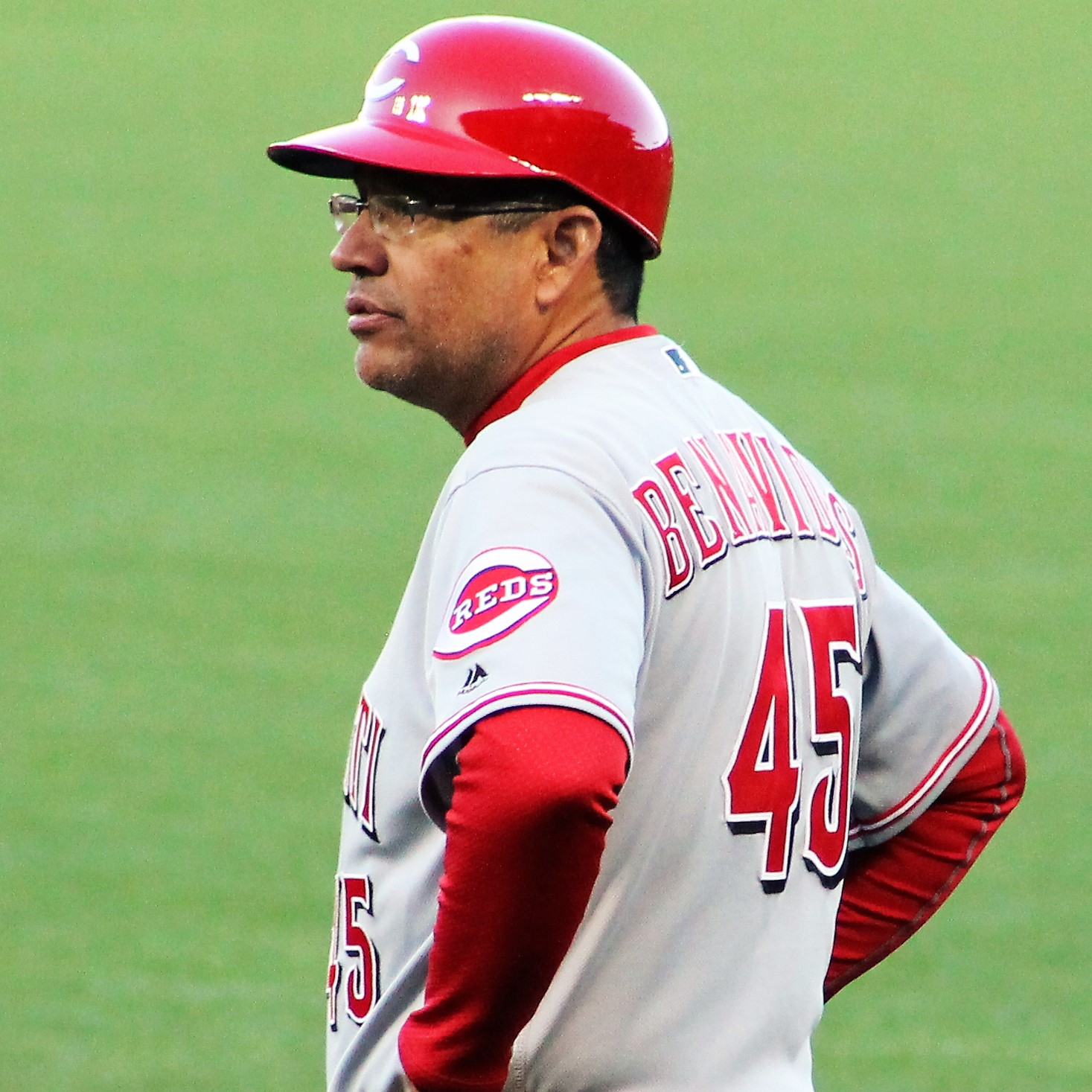
- Benavides with the Cincinnati Reds

Cincinnati Reds – No. 45
- Infielder / Coach / Manager
- Born: April 7, 1966 (age 59); Laredo, Texas, U.S.
- Batted: Right Threw: Right

MLB debut
- May 14, 1991, for the Cincinnati Reds

Last MLB appearance
- August 11, 1994, for the Montreal Expos

MLB statistics
- Batting average: .253
- Home runs: 4
- Runs batted in: 52
- Managerial record: 1–4
- Winning %: .200
- Stats at Baseball Reference

Teams
- As player: Cincinnati Reds (1991–1992); Colorado Rockies (1993); Montreal Expos (1994); As manager: Cincinnati Reds (2024); As coach: Cincinnati Reds (2016–present)

Alfredo Benavides (born April 7, 1966) is an American professional baseball player, coach, and manager who currently serves as the bench coach/field coordinator for the Cincinnati Reds of Major League Baseball (MLB). An infielder, Benavides played in MLB for the Cincinnati Reds, Colorado Rockies, and Montreal Expos from 1991 to 1994.

== Playing career ==
Benavides was born and raised in Laredo, Texas. He is of Mexican-American descent. He attended J. W. Nixon High School and Texas Christian University (TCU). He played college baseball for the TCU Horned Frogs. The Reds selected Benavides in the second round of the 1987 MLB draft and he made his MLB debut with Cincinnati on May 14, 1991.

The Colorado Rockies selected Benevides from the Reds in the MLB expansion draft, and he played for them during the 1993 season. After which, the Rockies traded Benevides to the Montreal Expos, where he played in 1994. His final big league game was on August 11, 1994.

== Coaching career ==
During the 2007 season he spent time as interim manager of the Cincinnati Reds' Rookie-Advanced affiliate, the Billings Mustangs.

He has also served as the infield coordinator of the Reds' minor league affiliates and is also head coach of the Freddie Benavides Baseball Academy, which takes place in Laredo from late November to mid January yearly.

In 2016, following Billy Hatcher's move to third-base coach, Benavides became the Reds first-base coach.

Following the 2018 season, Benavides was named the bench coach for the 2019 Reds under their new manager David Bell.

On April 9, 2019, Benavides managed the Reds while Bell was serving his one-game suspension after a bench-clearing incident against the Pittsburgh Pirates on April 7.

On September 22, 2024, the Reds fired Bell and named Benavides the interim manager for the remaining five games of the 2024 season.

=== Managerial record ===
| Team | Year | Regular season | | | | | Postseason | | | |
| Team | Year | Games | Won | Lost | Win % | Finish | Won | Lost | Win % | Result |
|---|---|---|---|---|---|---|---|---|---|---|
| CIN | 2024 | 5 | 1 | 4 | .200 | 4th in NL Central | | | | |
| Total | | 5 | 1 | 4 | .200 | | | | | |
