= Arturo Campos =

NASA engineer

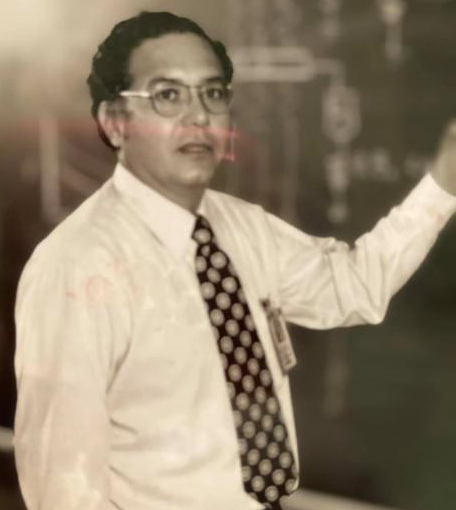

Arturo Campos (1934 – September 5, 2001) was an American electrical engineer who worked at NASA on the electrical systems for the Apollo and Space Shuttle programs. He played a major role in devising a solution to the emergency that arose during the Apollo 13 mission.

== Early life and education ==
Campos was born into a Mexican American family in Laredo, Texas; his father was a mechanic. He graduated in 1952 from Martin High School, attended Laredo Junior College, and in 1956 earned a degree in electrical engineering from the University of Texas.

== Career ==
He worked at Kelly Air Force Base as an aircraft maintenance supervisor before joining NASA in September 1963. At the Johnson Space Center, he played a major role in developing the electrical systems for both the Apollo spacecraft and the Space Shuttle. On April 13, 1970, he was the subsystem manager responsible for the lunar module power system when the Apollo 13 mission suffered a loss of power due to a fuel cell explosion, and led the way in devising a solution so that the three astronauts aboard could return to Earth safely. He retired from NASA in 1980 and became a consultant in electrical engineering in Houston.

While at the Johnson Space Center, Campos established its branch of the League of United Latin American Citizens and in 1974 became its first president, was a member of the employees' Hispanic Heritage Program, and served as Equal Employment Opportunity and Affirmative Action Program representative.

== Personal life and death ==
Campos and his wife, Petra T. Campos, had three daughters. He died of a heart attack at his home in Seabrook, Texas, at 66.

== Honors and legacy ==
Campos shared in the Presidential Medal of Freedom that was awarded to the Mission Control staff after the Apollo 13 incident.

He was inducted into the Martin High School Hall of Fame in 2002.

After a public contest, his name was used for the male mannequin Commander Moonikin Campos to be used to test radiation exposure and other hazards on the Artemis 1 lunar mission in 2022.
