= Beatrice Valdez Ximénez =

American sculptor

Beatrice Valdez Ximénez (November 5, 1904 – June 26, 1989) was an American folk sculptor. With Consuelo González Amezcua and Alicia Dickerson Montemayor, she was one of a handful of Texas women of Mexican descent to win fame as a folk artist.

Ximénez was a native of Graytown, Texas, the youngest of five children of Juan and Josefa (Caballero) Valdez; she grew up in San Antonio, receiving no formal education. In 1923 she married Pedro Ximénez, with whom she would go on to have six sons and one daughter. The family lived in Floresville. Pedro, a student of Dionicio Rodriguez and Sam Murray, produced faux-wooden cement furniture, and Beatrice learned to work with the material while helping him. The couple also produced buildings using the technique on their property. Pedro Ximénez died in 1956, and eleven years later Beatrice, inspired by children's books, science fiction films, and television nature shows, began creating animales feos, "ugly animals". Her first was a dinosaur, crafted at the request of a grandchild. Her grandson Johnny Verduzco often helped her with the more difficult portions of the process. Ximénez mixed the cement which she used in her art with sand and dyed it a bright color before ornamenting it with various objects. Over twenty-two years she completed some fifty life-sized figures, which she used to create a folk environment which has been called a "bizarre wild kingdom". Some of her pieces were included in a 1986 touring exhibition organized by Texas Flife Resources, and in 1987 she gave a workshop in working with cement at the Guadalupe Cultural Arts Center in San Antonio. Many sculptures by Ximénez have found their way into private collections; others remain at her former home in Floresville.

Ximénez's work was one of twenty artists featured in Artisans of Trabajo Rustico: The Legacy of Dionicio Rodríguez by Patsy Light and Kent Rush.
