= J. C. Martin (Texas politician) =

American politician

Joseph Claude "Pepe" Martin Jr.

Mayor of Laredo, Webb County, Texas, US
- In office 1954–1978
- Preceded by: Hugh S. Cluck
- Succeeded by: Aldo Tatangelo

Personal details
- Born: August 1, 1913 Laredo, Webb County; Texas, US
- Died: November 11, 1998 (aged 85) Laredo, Texas
- Resting place: Calvary Catholic Cemetery in Laredo
- Party: Democratic
- Spouse: Anita Ligarde Martin
- Relations: Honoré Ligarde (brother-in-law); Louis H. Bruni (nephew)
- Children: J. C. Martin, III) Patricia Martin "Patsy" Galo; Marialice Martin Cohen (later named Josephine Sacabo) Minnie Martin Daugherty
- Parent(s): Joseph C., Sr., and Minnie Bruni Martin
- Education: Laredo High School
- Occupation: Businessman

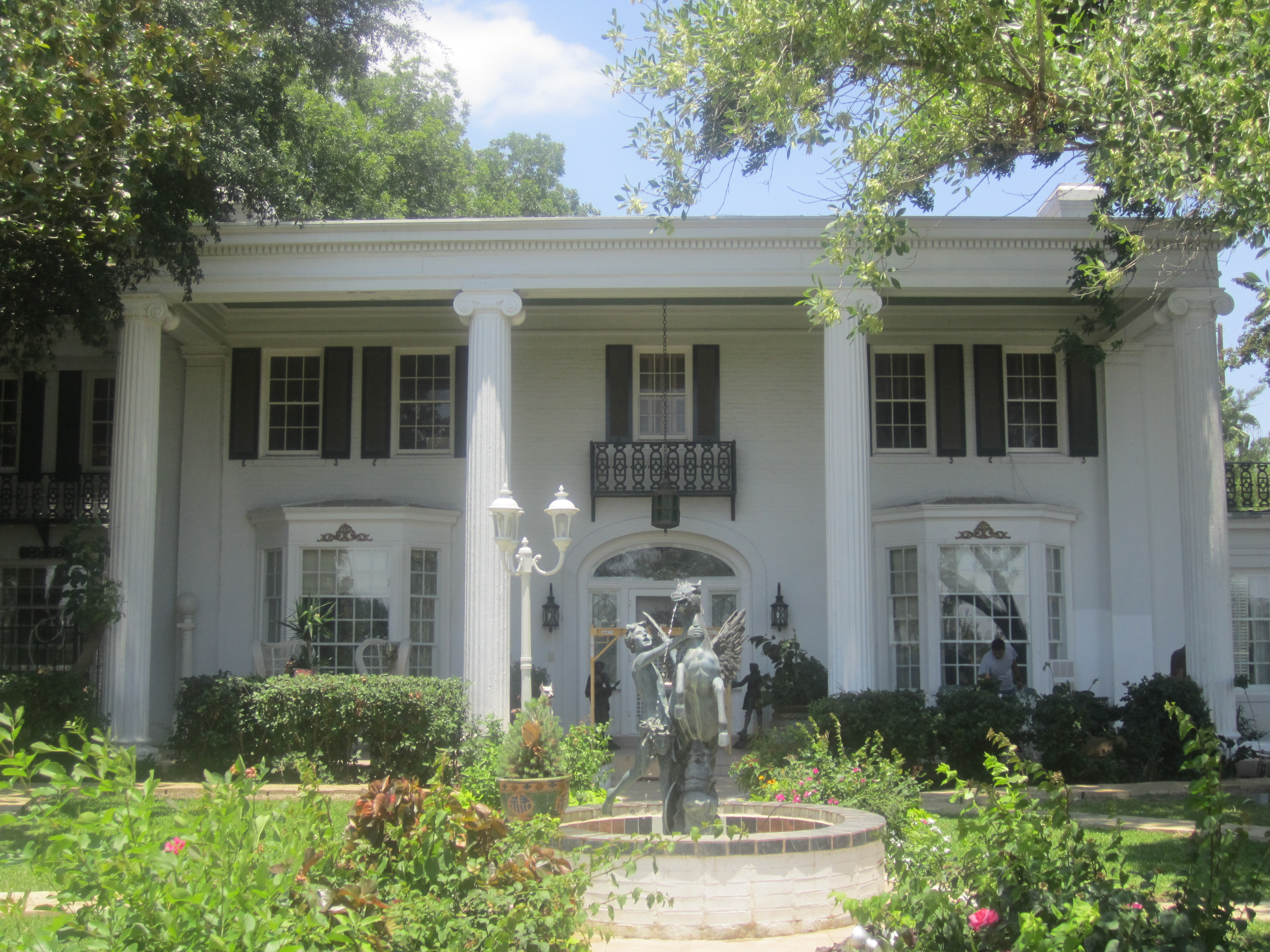
Ionic columned-residence of the late J. C. "Pepe" Martin at 1620 Clark Boulevard in Laredo, Texas

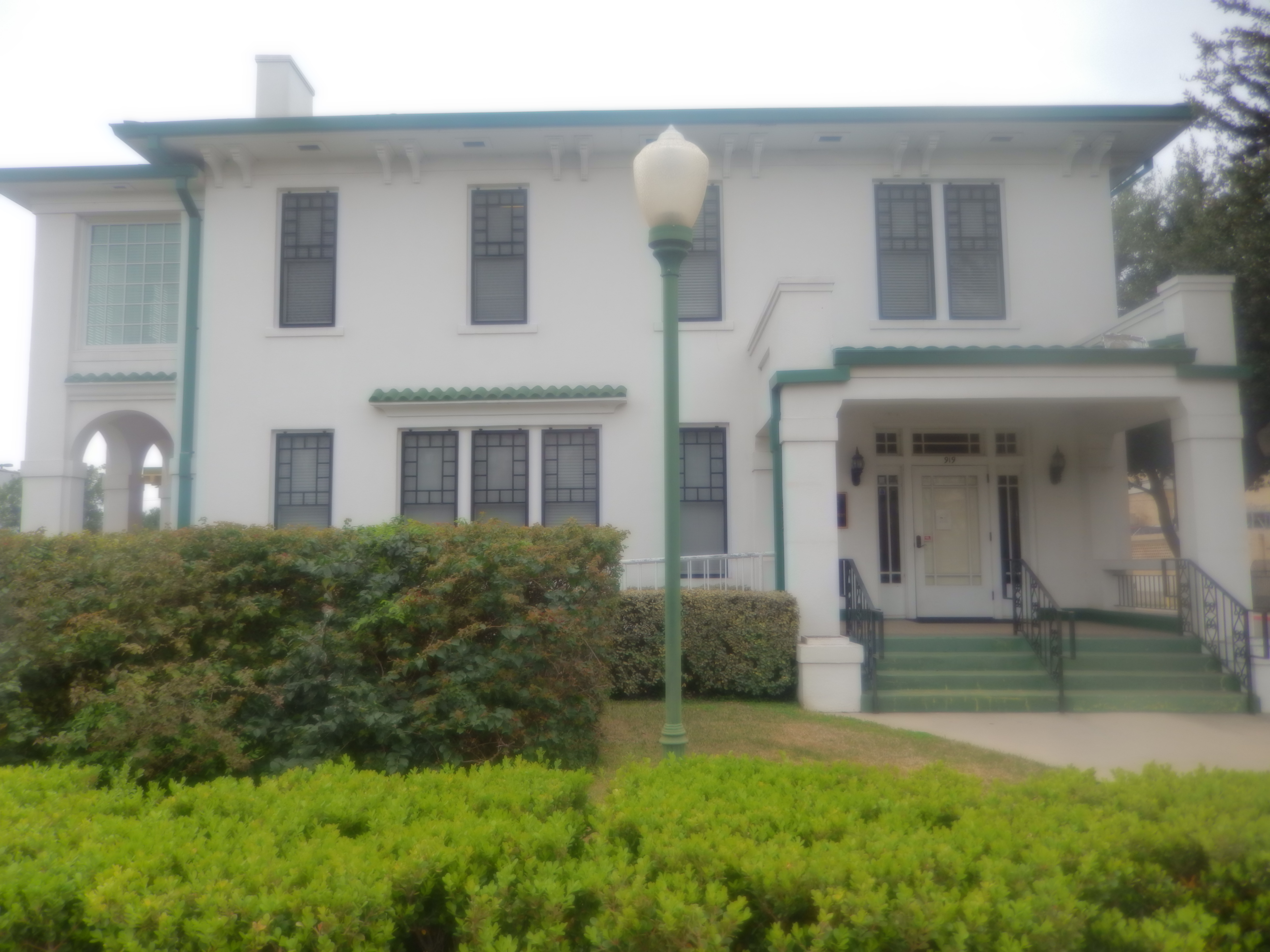
Historic home of J. C. Martin, Sr., and his wife, built on Washington Street in downtown Laredo in 1924 and restored in 2005 by Martin's great-granddaughter, Minnie Dora Haynes

Joseph Claude Martin Jr., known as Pepe Martin or Jose Martin or Joe Martin (August 1, 1913 – November 11, 1998), was from 1954 to 1978 the mayor of his native Laredo, Texas. He was known as el patron, a term which refers to a political boss in South Texas who performs perceived favors for the public in return for absolute political loyalty.

== Background ==
A Laredo native, Martin was the paternal grandson of Raymond Martin, a wealthy Laredo landowner. His parents were J. C. Martin, Sr. (1886–1957) and the former Minnie Bruni (1889–1973). The Martin Building, on the campus of Laredo Community College, dedicated in 1970 and renovated in 2016, is named in honor of the senior Joseph Martin. This Martin was the president of the Laredo independent school District board of trustees, which in 1947 spearheaded the opening of LCC, which was known until 1993 as Laredo Junior College. The Martin Building houses the LCC information technology department, which includes the offices of institutional effectiveness and institutional research and planning.

Martin was married to the former Anita Ligarde (1915–2004), a daughter of Amedee and Sara Ligarde. The couple had a son, J. C. "Pepito" Martin, III (1941-2023), and three daughters. Patricia "Patsy" Martin Galo (born c. 1942) is the wife of Dr. Michael V. Galo, who practiced medicine in Laredo from 1973 until his retirement in 2013. Marialice Martin Cohen (born 1944), later known as Josephine Sacabo, is a photographer in New Orleans, Louisiana. The third daughter is Minnie Dora Martin Daugherty (born c. 1945) of Laredo.

Anita Martin's brother was former State Representative Honoré Ligarde, whose legislative tenure after 1963 coincided with Martin's mayoralty period.

Martin graduated from the former Laredo High School, which was then located at the downtown site occupied by La Posada Hotel. The institution was moved northward on San Bernardo Avenue to become Martin High School, named for Martin's paternal grandparents, Raymond and Tirza Garcia Martin. Tirza Garcia Martin, Martin's grandmother, was the daughter of Bartolo Garcia, one of the towns leading economic and political figures, and descended from the original settlers of Laredo, Texas. Raymond Martin was an active businessman and politician in Laredo.

== Political life ==
The senior J. C. Martin was a businessman and rancher who was elected sheriff of Webb County. Martin was elected mayor on April 6, 1954, just prior to a natural disaster, the flooding of the Rio Grande, which caused extensive damage to both Laredo and its sister city, Nuevo Laredo in Mexico. Martin won six four-year terms until he declined to run again in 1978.

A month after the self-styled "reform" candidate Aldo Tatangelo was elected mayor in 1978, Martin was indicted by a federal grand jury on a single count of mail fraud. He pleaded guilty and paid a $1,000 fine and $201,118 to the city in restitution for use of city employees on his private properties. He was further sentenced to serve thirty weekends in the Webb County Jail.

As a result of the strong mayor-council system of government that had existed in Laredo for more than eighty years, the revised Laredo City Council in 1979 approved a new city charter which established the still existing City manager government. The transition was made in 1982–1983.

Martin resided in the older Heights neighborhood of Laredo in a large white house with Corinthian columns near the intersection of Clark Boulevard and Meadow Street. He and his wife are interred in his family plot at Calvary Catholic Cemetery in Laredo.

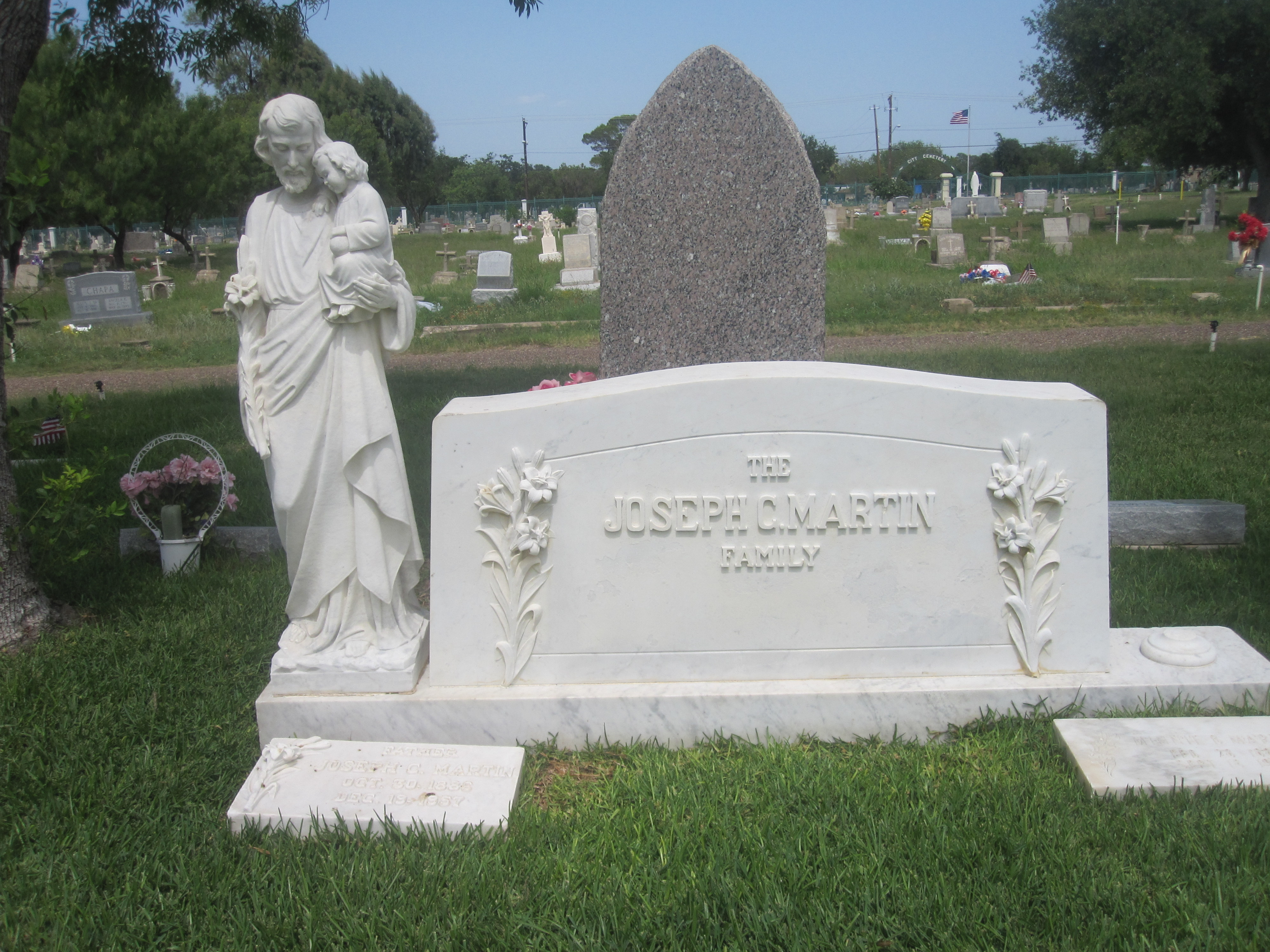
Martin family gravestone in Calvary Catholic Cemetery in Laredo

== See also ==
- Peter Arguindegui

Preceded by Hugh S. Cluck	Mayor of Laredo, Texas; 1954–1978	Succeeded by Aldo Tatangelo
