= Early College High School (Laredo, Texas) =

Héctor J. García Early College High School

Location
- 5241 University Blvd; Laredo, Texas 78041; United States; 27°34′10″N 99°26′17″W

Information
- Type: Public
- Motto: Educating the mind, without educating the heart, is no education at all.
- Established: 2006
- School district: Laredo Independent School District
- Principal: Margarita L. Taboada
- Teaching staff: 18.00 (FTE)
- Grades: 9 through 12
- Enrollment: 383 (2023–2024)
- Student to teacher ratio: 21.28
- Color: Maroon
- Mascot: Phoenix
- Accreditation: Blue Ribbon
- Website: earlycollege.elisd.org

The Héctor J. García Early College High School (formerly named Laredo Early College High School at Texas A&M International University) is located in Laredo, Texas. Its address is 5241 University Boulevard. It is one of the four high schools under the Laredo Independent School District. It was established in August 2006 and was first situated in portable buildings that shared grounds with Texas A&M International University. The first graduating class was the Class of 2010. In 2012, the portable buildings were replaced with a new edifice that is two stories tall with two sets of stairs and elevator accessibility on each floor. It has a student population of approximately 400 students. This school is currently ranked #72 in the nation by U.S. News & World Report. The school has won 2 blue ribbon awards, 2017 and 2023

== History ==
Established in August 2006 as Laredo Early College High School at Texas A&M International University and was first situated in portable buildings that shared grounds with Texas A&M International University. The first graduating class was the Class of 2010.

In 2012, the portable buildings were replaced with a new edifice that is two stories tall with three sets of stairs and elevator accessibility on each floor. It has a student population of approximately 400 students.

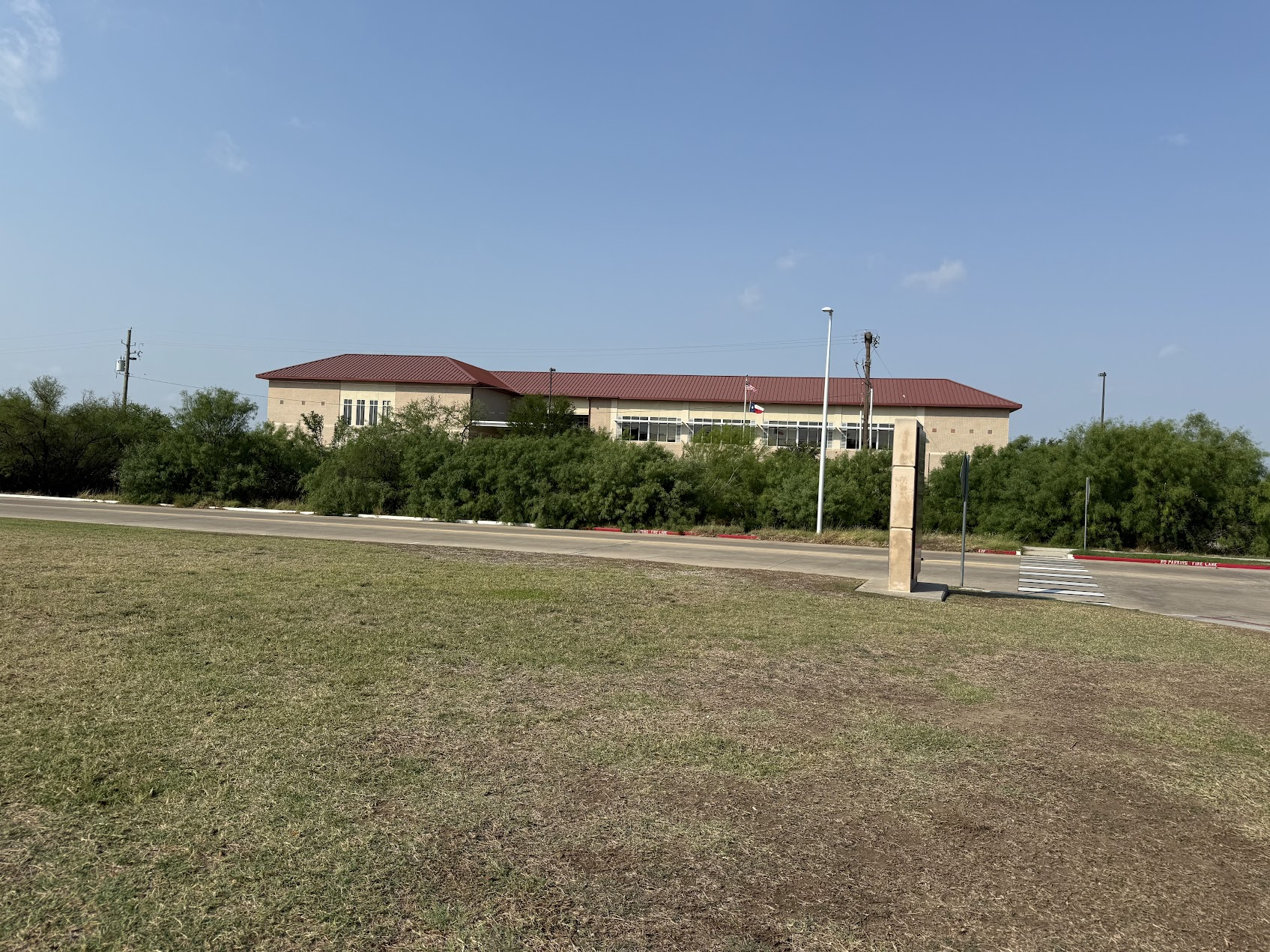
Héctor J. García Early College High School, viewed from TAMIU

On December 16, 2016, The LISD Board of Trustees officially named the Early College High School after Board Member Hector “Tito” Garcia during a dedication ceremony. The new name brought along some controversy among students, as some wanted to graduate with the original name.

On September 29, 2017, Hector J. Garcia Early College High School was named a National Blue Ribbon School. The school received the designation for a second time on September 22, 2023.

== Academics ==
Héctor J. García Early College High at TAMIU currently offers 3 AP courses:

- AP Calculus AB
- AP Spanish Language and Culture
- AP Spanish Literature and Culture

Most of the high school pupils in this school take pre-AP and college-level courses. This school is required to administer the STAAR EOCs to its students.

== See also ==
- Early entrance to college
