= Laredo Independent School District =

Public school district in Texas, United States

Address
- 2400 San Bernardo Avenue Laredo, Texas, 78040; United States

District information
- Grades: PK–12
- Schools: 30
- NCES District ID: 4826790

Students and staff
- Students: 20,592 (2023–2024)
- Teachers: 1,421.96 (on an FTE basis)
- Student–teacher ratio: 14.48:1

Other information
- Website: www.laredoisd.org

Laredo Independent School District is a public school district based in Laredo in Webb County, Texas, United States. The district serves the south central portion of Laredo. In 2009, LISD was rated "academically acceptable" by the Texas Education Agency.

== Schools ==
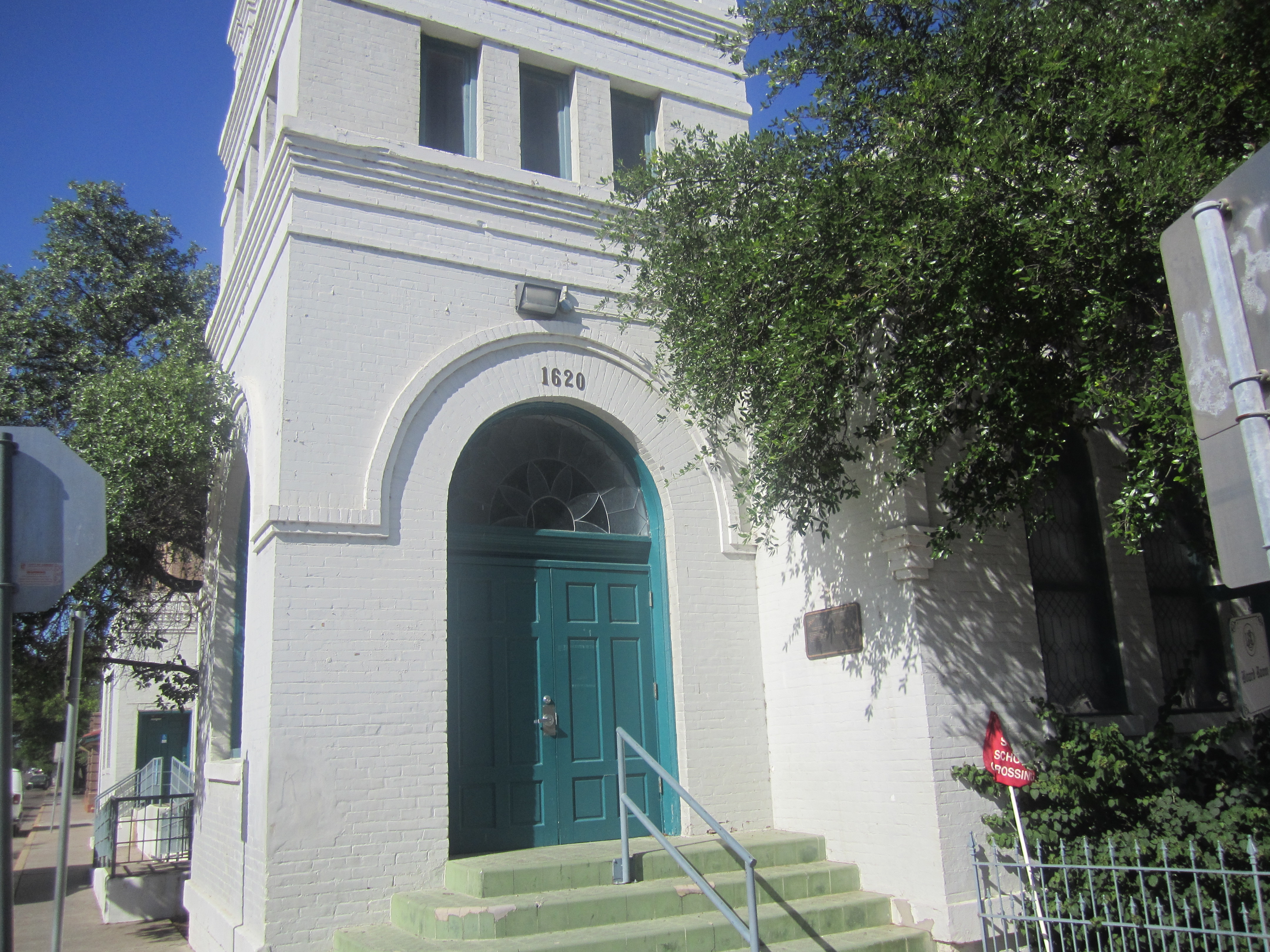
Prior to 1963, the LISD board room was the sanctuary of the First Baptist Church of Laredo.

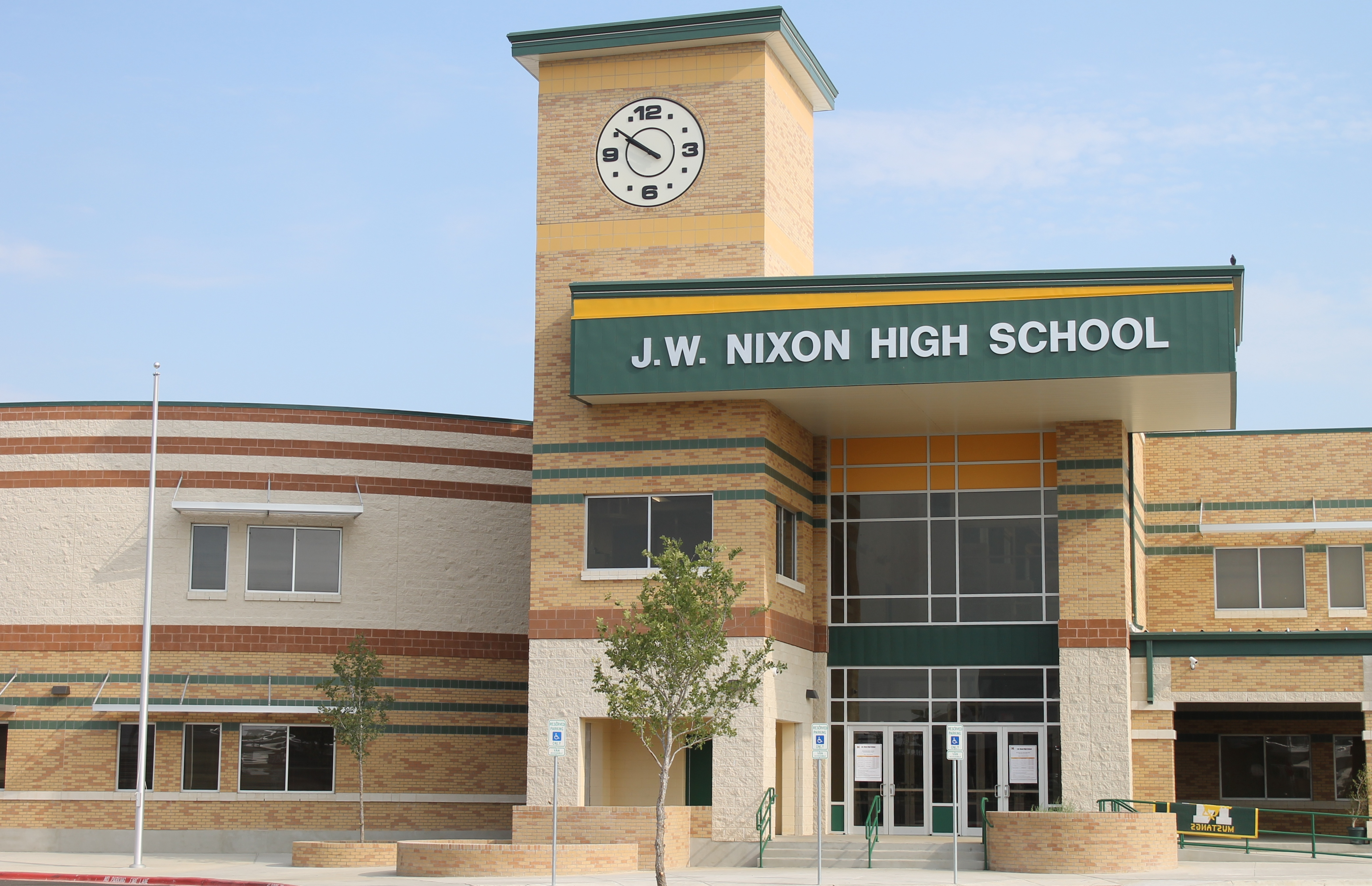
J. W. Nixon High School

=== Elementary schools (prekindergarten-grade 5) ===
- Alma A. Pierce Elementary School
- Anita T. Dovalina Elementary School, named for the mother of former Laredo Community College President Ramon H. Dovalina
- Antonio M. Bruni Elementary School
- Christopher M. Mcdonnell Elementary School
- Clarence L. Milton Elementary School
- Demetrio D. Hachar Elementary School
- Don Jose Gallego Elementary School
- Francisco Farias Elementary School
- Heights Elementary School
- Henry B. Zachry Elementary School
- Honore Ligarde Elementary School
- Jesus A. Kawas Elementary School
- John Z. Leyendecker Elementary School
- Joseph C. Martin Elementary School
- Katherine F. Tarver Elementary School
- Leon Daiches Elementary School
- Michael S. Ryan Elementary School
- Santa Maria Elementary School
- Santo Niño Elementary School
- Tomas Sanches/Hermelinda Ochoa Elementary School

=== Middle schools (grades 6–8) ===
- Dr. Joaquin G. Cigarroa Middle School
- Louis J. Christen Middle School
- Memorial Middle School
- Mirabeau B. Lamar Middle School

=== High schools (grades 9–12) ===
- Dr. Leonides G. Cigarroa High School
- Joseph W. Nixon High School
- Raymond & Tirza Martin High School
- Hector. J. Garcia Early College High School

=== Magnet schools ===
- Dr. Dennis D. Cantu Health Science Magnet School
- Sabas Perez School for Engineering and Technology Education
- Vidal M. Treviño School of Communications and Fine Arts, named for former Superintendent and State Representative Vidal M. Treviño

=== Other campuses ===
- Francisco S. Lara Academy
- Jose A. Valdez High School
