= Cigarroa High School =

Dr. Leonides Gonzalez Cigarroa High School

Location
- 2600 Zacatecas Street; Laredo, Texas 78046; United States; 27.473394°N 99.470092°W

Information
- Type: Public
- Motto: The Pride of South Laredo!
- Established: 1983
- School district: Laredo Independent School District
- Grades: 9-12
- Enrollment: 1,438 (2023-2024)
- Color
- Mascot: Toro
- Website: cigarroahs.elisd.org

Dr. Leonides Gonzalez Cigarroa High School is a public high school located in Laredo Independent School District in Laredo in Webb County in south Texas. Grades nine through twelve are taught there. It serves students living in south Laredo. It has a student population of about 1,300. The school's namesake is a late medical doctor.

In 2014, Cigarroa High School fell short of minimum state standards and was placed on the Public Education Grant list.

== Magnet school ==
Cigarroa High School also houses the L.I.S.D. Sabas Perez Engineering and Technology Magnet School, a magnet school focused on engineering and technology education. The students may choose three different paths (engineering, technology or oil and gas) while enrolled in the magnet. The instructors are Amanda Gonzalez for engineering, Christine Garza for oil, and gas, and Alexander Castro for technology pathways.

In 2007-2008 the robotics team competed and won the regional district competition in Edinburgh, Texas. After the regionals, the team went to the state competition. In 2009, Cigarroa students had the highest TAKS standardized test scores in Laredo.

== School history ==
Named after a renowned local physician, Dr. Leonides Gonzalez Cigarroa High School is located at 2600 Zacatecas Street in South Laredo, Texas. It opened its doors to a large group of freshmen and sophomores in August 1983. It graduated its first seniors in 1985 and its first true class (four years at Cigarroa High School) in 1987 under the direction of its first principal, Mr. Alfredo “El Toro Grande” Montemayor.

Since then other leaders have taken the helm of Cigarroa High School as did Mr. Pedro Lara, Mrs. Cynthia Conchas, Mr. Mario Guzman, "El Toro Chico", Dr. Sonia Sanchez, Mr. Oscar Perez, Mr. John Eric Salinas, Mrs. Laura M. Flores, and currently Mr. Jose E. Iznaola. With a Toro (bull) as a Mascot, a bullring-style courtyard, and a yearbook titled “La Fiesta Brava”, the school pays homage to the Mexican and Spanish roots of its community members. The theme was also a passion Dr. Leo G. Cigarroa as he frequently traveled to Mexico and Spain. The school colors are royal blue and silver as are the beautiful Texas skies and its clouds as Mr. Alfredo Montemayor once stated. During his eleven-year tenure, Mr. Mario Guzman gave the school the slogan: “The Pride of South Laredo” and since then Cigarroa High School has lived up to its motto.

A tradition, set by the first Toro family back in 1983, is a time capsule which was embedded in the front of the school and opened during the 25th anniversary festivities in 2008. It was quite an experience for the alumni and staff to travel back in time through the mementos that were uncovered. During the festivities, a bronze bull was uncovered and a commemorative monument and marble bench were also presented to the public. The Toro sculpture was dedicated to Mr. Alfredo Montemayor who was the guest of honor. A second capsule was assembled and embedded to be opened in 2033 during the 50th anniversary festivities. The campus currently houses approximately 1,311 students, 130 teachers and 75 staff members.
