= Martin High School (Laredo, Texas) =

Public school in Texas, United States

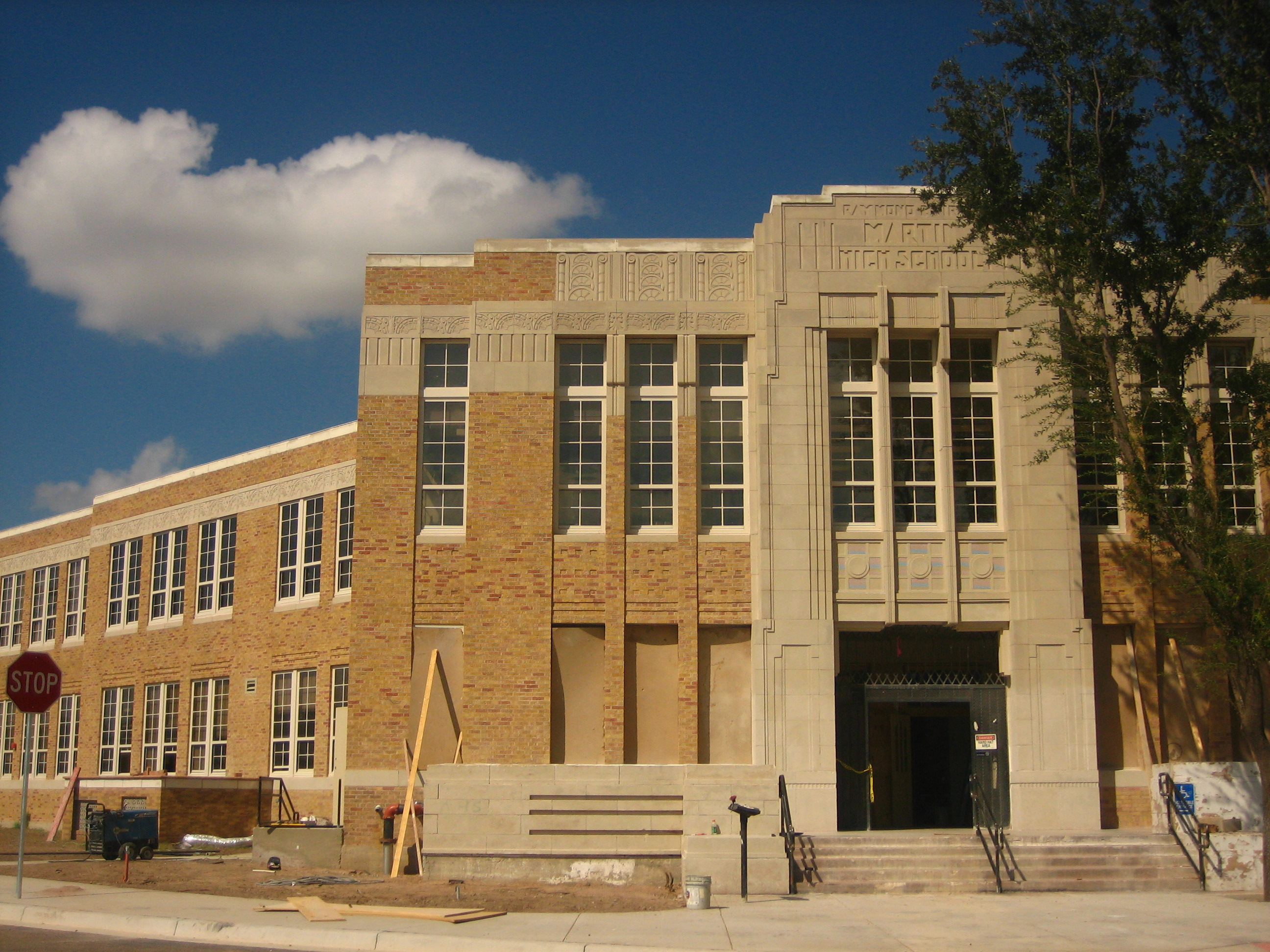

Location
- 2002 San Bernardo Avenue; Laredo, Texas, United States; 78040
- Coordinates: 27.5179°N 99.5063°W

Information
- Former name: Laredo High School (1916-1937)
- Type: Public
- Motto: Once A Tiger, Always A Tiger
- Established: 1937
- School district: Laredo Independent School District
- Principal: Mario Mireles
- Grades: 9–12
- Enrollment: 1,978 (2023–2024)
- Student to teacher ratio: 16.0:1
- Colors: Red and white
- Mascot: Tiger
- Website: martinhs.elisd.org

Raymond & Tirza Martin High School is a secondary school in the Laredo Independent School District in Laredo, Texas, United States. Grades 9–12 are taught there. It serves students living in central Laredo. The school is adjacent to the Laredo Civic Center.

== History ==
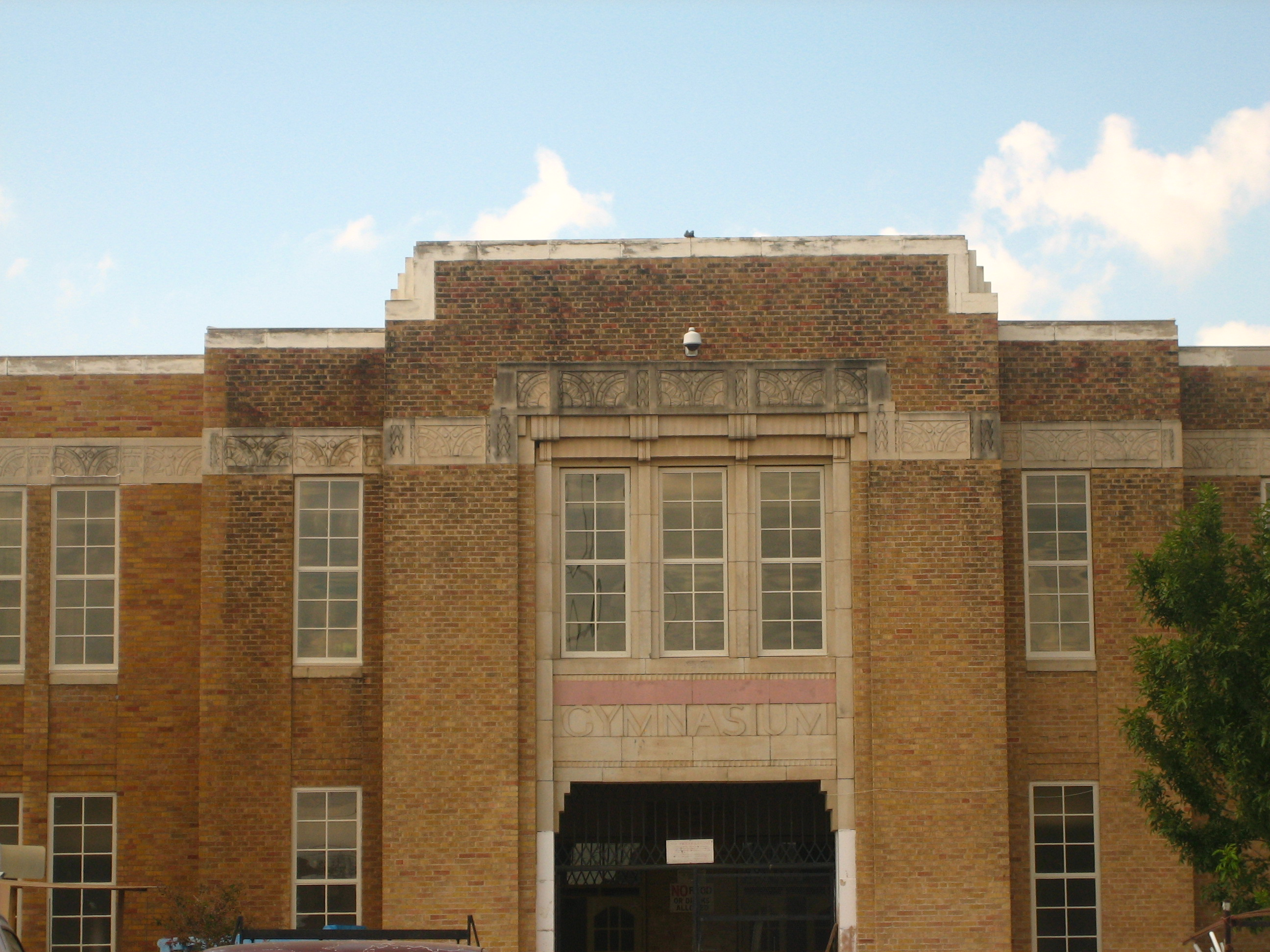
The former gymnasium at Martin High School

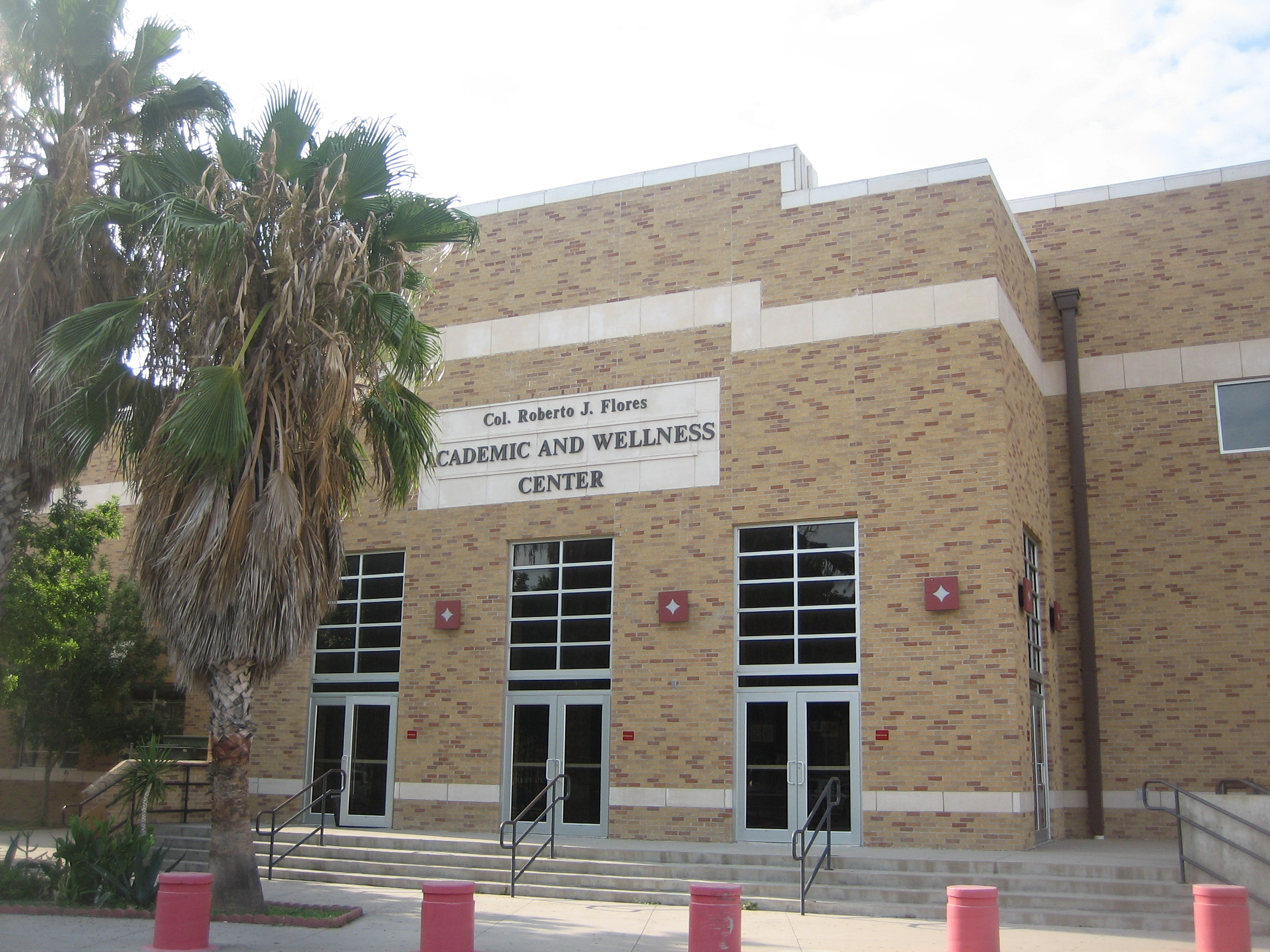
The Colonel Roberto Flores Academic and Wellness Center on the Martin High School campus

Laredo High School, the first public school in Laredo, was founded downtown in 1916 at the site of the present day La Posada Hotel. In 1937, Laredo High School was moved to San Bernardo Avenue and renamed Martin High School. It was the only public high school in Laredo from 1937 until 1964, when J. W. Nixon High School opened in The Heights neighborhood.

== Magnet school ==
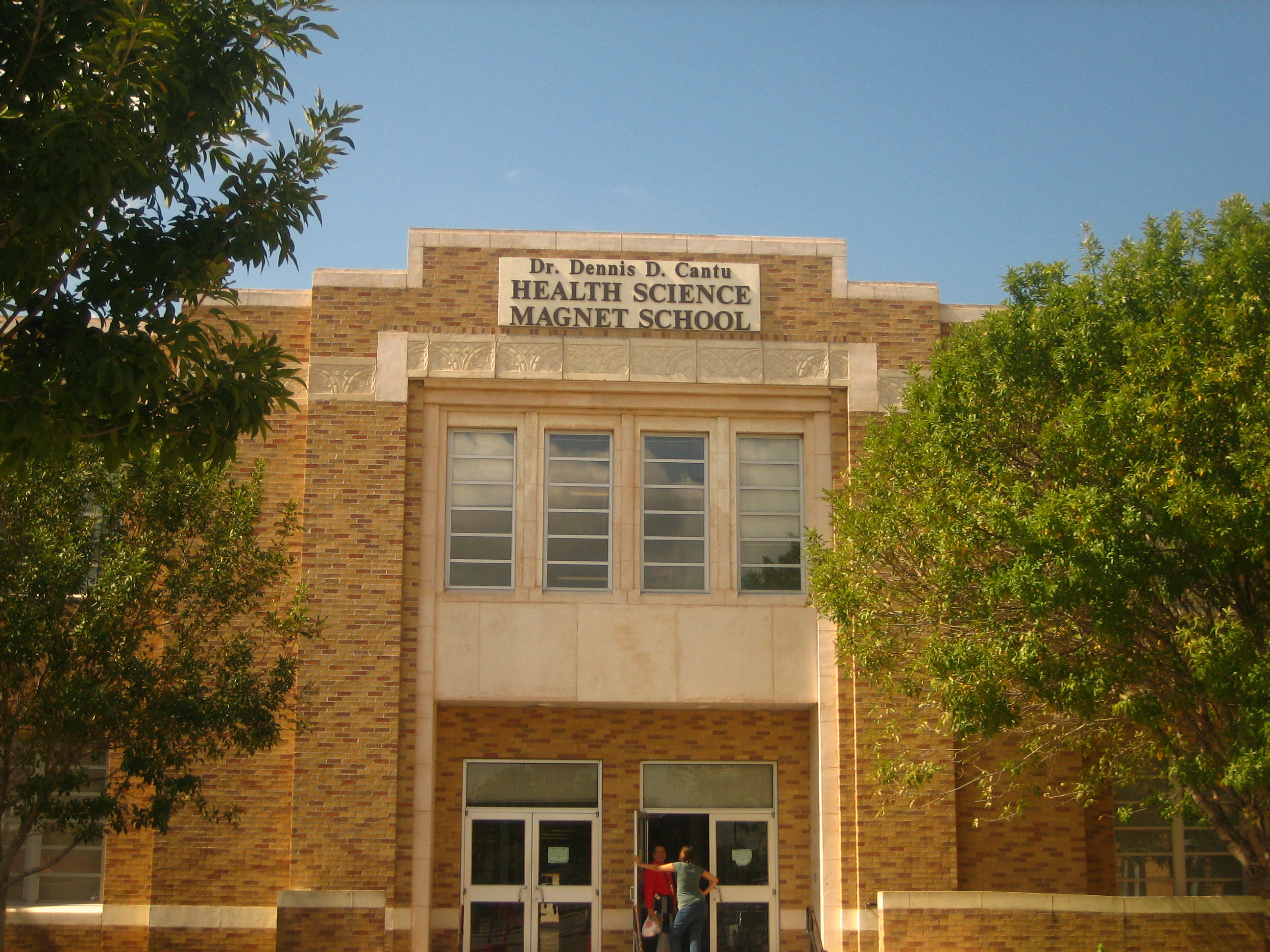
The Health Science Magnet School of Laredo ISD is named for physician Dennis D. Cantu, a member of the Laredo independent school District Board.

The Esther G. Buckley Early College High School focuses on health and science education, with two career paths available. Esther Buckley was a graduate of Martin High School and of the magnet school. Esther G. Buckley was a teacher the magnet school, before its name change. Along with being a member of the United States Commission on Civil Rights

== Notable alumni ==
- Esther Buckley (1948–2013), Class of 1963 – educator and politician.
- Arturo Campos (1943–2001), NASA engineer
- Ramón H. Dovalina (born 1943), Class of 1960 – president of Laredo Community College, 1995 to 2007
- Abraham Kazen (1919–1987) – U.S. representative from 1967 to 1983
- Juan L. Maldonado (born 1948), Class of 1967 – President of Laredo Community College since 2007
- J. C. "Pepe" Martin, Jr. (1913–1998), Class of 1930 – Mayor of Laredo, 1954 to 1978
- César A. Martínez (born 1944), artist, prominent in the Chicano world of art
- Alicia Dickerson Montemayor (1902–1989), Class of 1924 – Hispanic activist and community organizer
