= Interstate 35 =

Interstate Highway from Texas to Minnesota

Interstate 35
- Interstate 35, with eastern and western forks.

Route information
- Length: 1,569.06 mi (2,525.16 km)
- Existed: August 14, 1957–present
- History: Completed in 1982
- NHS: Entire route

Major junctions
- South end: US 83 in Laredo, TX
- I-69W in Laredo, TX; I-10 in San Antonio, TX; I-37 in San Antonio, TX; I-14 from Belton to Temple, TX; I-40 in Oklahoma City, OK; I-44 in Oklahoma City, OK; I-29 / I-70 in Kansas City, MO; I-80 from West Des Moines to Ankeny, IA; I-90 in Albert Lea, MN
- North end: MN 61 in Duluth, MN

Location
- Country: United States
- States: Texas, Oklahoma, Kansas, Missouri, Iowa, Minnesota

Highway system
- Interstate Highway System; Main; Auxiliary; Suffixed; Business; Future

Interstate 35 (I-35) is a major Interstate Highway in the central United States. As with most primary Interstates that end in a five, it is a major cross-country, north–south route. It stretches from Laredo, Texas, near the Mexican border to Duluth, Minnesota, at Minnesota State Highway 61 (MN 61, London Road) and 26th Avenue East. The highway splits into I-35E and I-35W in two separate places, the Dallas–Fort Worth metroplex in Texas and at the Minnesota twin cities of Minneapolis–Saint Paul.

At 1,568 miles (2,523 km), I-35 is the ninth-longest Interstate Highway following I-94, and it is the third-longest north–south Interstate Highway, following I-75 and I-95. Even though the route is generally considered to be a border-to-border highway, this highway does not directly connect to either international border. I-35's southern terminus is the traffic signal at Hidalgo Street in Laredo, Texas, just short of the Mexican border. Travelers going south can take one of two toll bridges across the Rio Grande and the border, either straight ahead onto the Juárez–Lincoln International Bridge, or via Business Interstate 35-A (Bus. I-35-A) through downtown Laredo into the Gateway to the Americas International Bridge. To the north, I-35 terminates in Duluth, Minnesota, with connections to Canada from the Interstate's terminus via MN 61 to Grand Portage, or north to the border at International Falls, Minnesota, via U.S. Route 53 (US 53) in Duluth.

In addition to the Dallas–Fort Worth and Minneapolis–Saint Paul areas, the major cities that I-35 also connects to include (from south to north) San Antonio, Texas; Austin, Texas; Oklahoma City, Oklahoma; Wichita, Kansas; Kansas City, Missouri; and Des Moines, Iowa.

== Route description ==
Lengths
	mi	km
TX	503.96	811.05
OK	235.96	379.74
KS	235.53	379.05
MO	114.74	184.66
IA	219.23	352.82
MN	259.64	417.85
Total	1,569.06	2,525.16

=== Texas ===
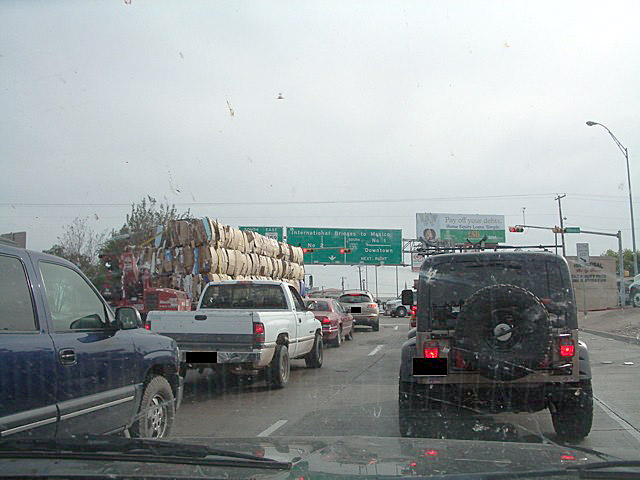
I-35 starts at this traffic signal in Laredo, Texas

I-35 northbound begins at a traffic-signaled intersection with Bus. I-35-A in Laredo, Texas, just north of the Rio Grande and the international border between Mexico and the US. It has a 17-mile (27 km) concurrency with US 83. Through Webb, La Salle, and Frio counties, it has a mostly north-northeastern course, turning more northeasterly around Moore. It then cuts across the corners of Medina and Atascosa counties before entering Bexar County and San Antonio.

I-35 is named the Pan Am Expressway in San Antonio. There, it has brief concurrencies with I-10 (with it US 87) and I-410, and it serves as the northern terminus of I-37. I-35 heads northeast out of the city toward the state capital, Austin.

In Austin, I-35 is the Interregional Highway and has a concurrency with US 290 through Downtown Austin. Throughout Austin, elevated express lanes were constructed on either side of the original freeway. Prior to this expansion, this section included an at-grade railroad crossing, which is extremely unusual for a freeway. From Austin, I-35 goes through Round Rock, Temple, Pflugerville, and Waco. In Belton, south of Temple, it serves as the current eastern terminus for I-14. In Waco, I-35 is known as the Jack Kultgen Freeway, and begins its concurrency with US 77. The campuses of both the University of Texas at Austin and Baylor University are located adjacent to I-35.

I-35 then heads to Hillsboro, where it splits into I-35W and I-35E and runs through the Dallas–Fort Worth area. The official milemarkers, along with the route of US 77, follow I-35E through Dallas—I-35W, which is 85 miles (137 km) in length, carries its own mileage from Hillsboro to Denton, as though it were an I-35 loop. In Dallas, I-35E is the R.L. Thornton Freeway south of I-30, which picks up the name heading east. North of I-30, it is the Stemmons Freeway.

After passing through Dallas and Fort Worth, I-35's two forks rejoin each other in Denton near the University of North Texas campus. The unified Interstate then continues north to Gainesville before crossing the Red River into Oklahoma.

=== Oklahoma ===
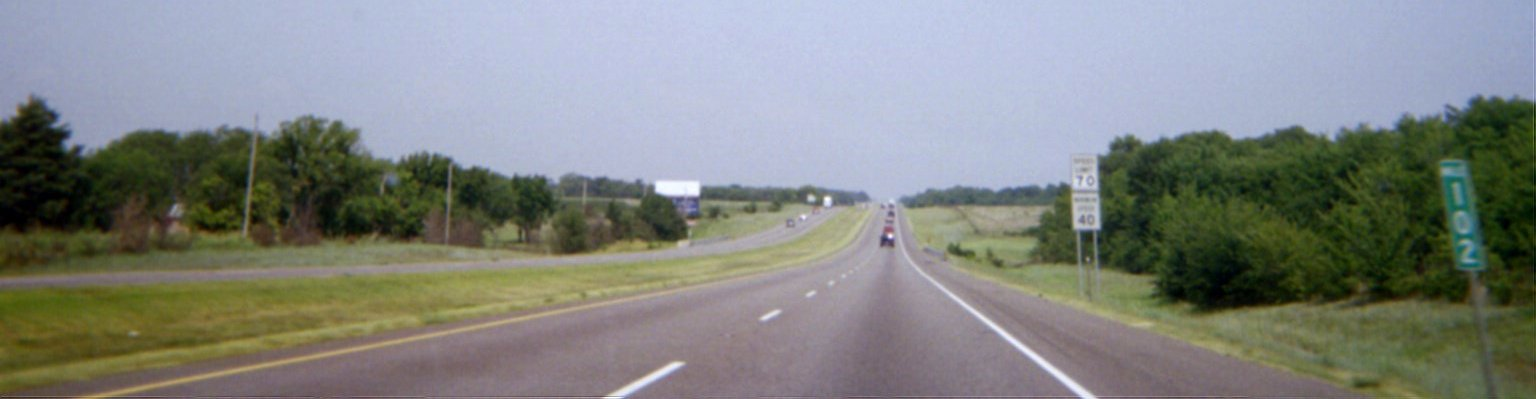
I-35 in Goldsby, Oklahoma, at milemarker 102

In Oklahoma, I-35 runs from the Red River at the Texas border to the Kansas state line near Braman. It passes through or adjacent to many of the state's major cities. From south to north, these cities include Ardmore, Pauls Valley, Purcell, Norman, Moore, Oklahoma City, and Edmond. In Downtown Oklahoma City, I-35 has a major junction with I-40 and spurs into I-235 through the north central inner city as heavy traffic follows through the city into the northern area of the state.

=== Kansas ===
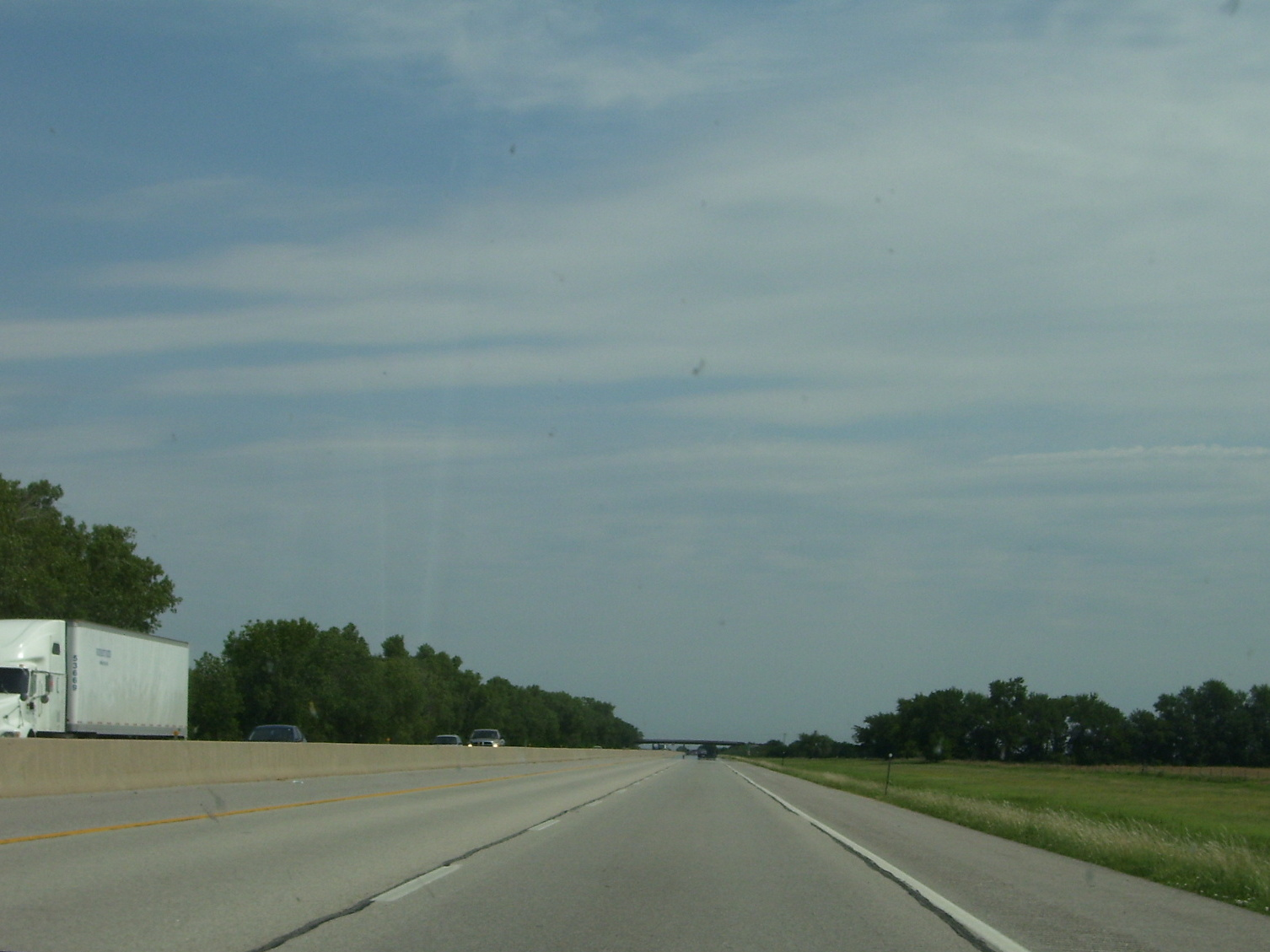
A view from the I-35 portion of the Kansas Turnpike, between mileposts 29 and 30

Between the Oklahoma state line and Emporia, I-35 is part of the Kansas Turnpike. This section of Interstate serves Wichita and passes through the Flint Hills area. At Emporia, I-35 branches off on its own alignment. This free section of I-35 provides access to Ottawa before entering the Kansas City Metropolitan Area, where it serves Johnson County and Kansas City, Kansas.

Of note on the route, at several points between Cassoday and Emporia in the Flint Hills, dirt driveways that provide direct access without a ramp for cattle trucks may be found in either direction along the highway.

BETO Junction is a highway intersection in Coffey County, Kansas, that is the intersection of US 75 and I-35. It derives its name from the four major cities nearest the intersection: Burlington, Emporia, Topeka, and Ottawa. It is located 16 miles (26 km) north of Burlington at exit 155. Historically, the intersection referred to as "BETO Junction" before I-35 was constructed was located on the old US 75 alignments two miles (3.2 km) south and two miles (3.2 km) east, near Waverly, Kansas.

=== Missouri ===
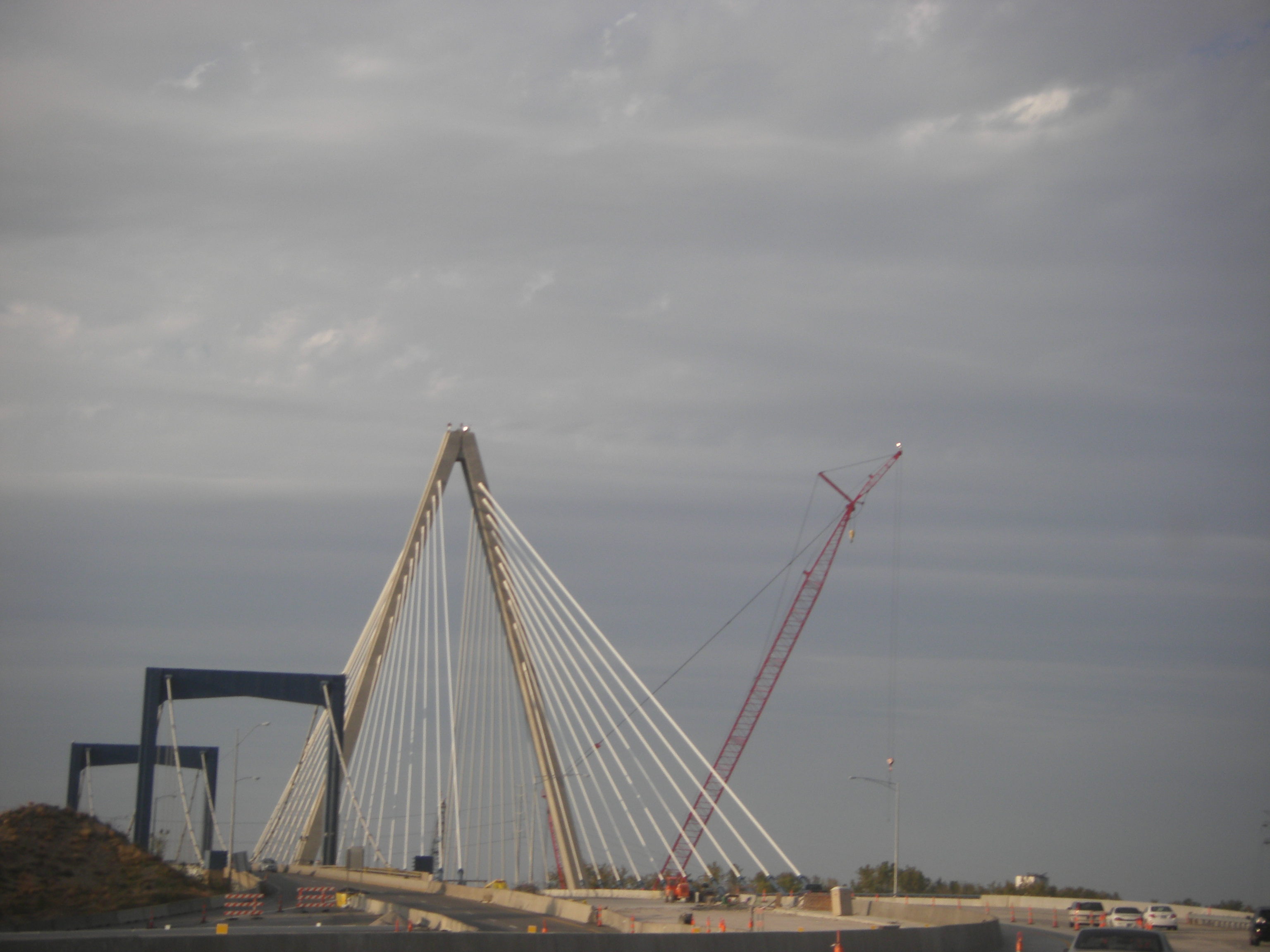
Bond Bridge carries I-35 in Kansas City

I-35 enters Missouri two miles (3.2 km) southwest of Kansas City's Central Business District as a six-lane highway. After merging with Southwest Trafficway and Broadway, it becomes eight lanes and continues north to downtown Kansas City, where it serves as the west and north legs of the downtown freeway loop. Along the north edge of the loop, I-35 joins with I-70 immediately west of Broadway and carries six lanes of traffic with a speed limit of 45 mph (72 km/h). Upon leaving the loop, I-29 begins, concurrent with I-35. The two Interstates cross the Missouri River together on the Bond Bridge.

After crossing the river, I-29 and I-35 split. I-35 heads north to Cameron, Missouri, and then continues northward to the Iowa state line.

=== Iowa ===
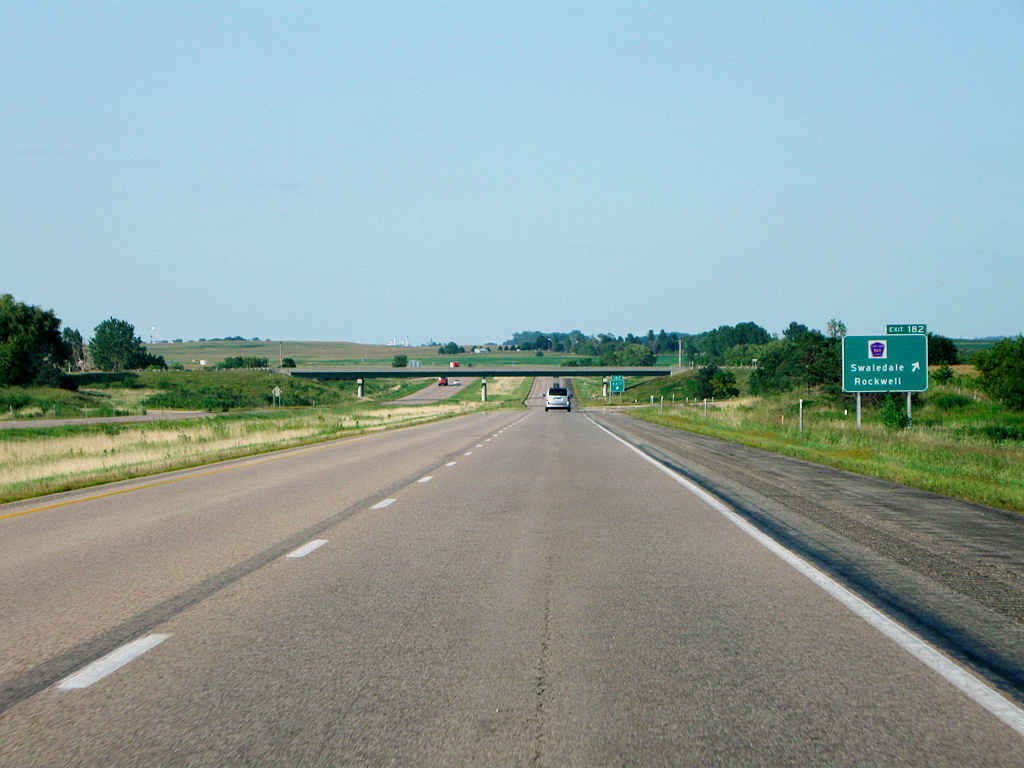
I-35 in Iowa, near exit 182. The town of Swaledale is about one mile (1.6 km) to the east.

In the southern sections of the state, I-35 is parallel to US 69 for much of its course.

In Des Moines, I-35 has a 12-mile (19 km) overlap with I-80. The concurrency takes place northwest of the downtown district of the city. At exit 127 of I-80, the overlap turns east and terminates at exit 137 via an interchange with I-235.

North of Des Moines, I-35 is mainly parallel with US 69, traversing a vast and rural area of Iowa.

I-35 is part of the Avenue of the Saints between Clear Lake and St. Paul, Minnesota. A four-lane link has been completed between Clear Lake and I-380 in Waterloo, Iowa.

=== Minnesota ===
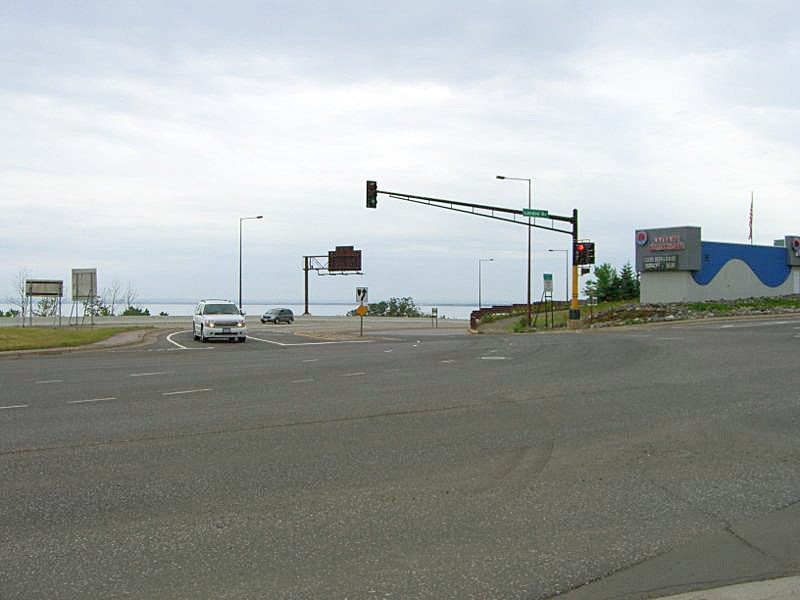
I-35's northern terminus is at this intersection with London Road (MN 61) in Duluth, Minnesota, with Lake Superior in the background.

At Medford, Minnesota, the on- and offramps lead to roundabouts rather than standard cross intersections. This is the first site in the state linked to a major highway to use roundabouts.

I-35 splits again into I-35W and I-35E in the Minneapolis–Saint Paul area. The mile- and exit-numbering sequence continues along I-35E. At one sharp turn in I-35W near the junction with I-94, drivers are advised to slow to 35 mph (56 km/h) (although many drivers are able to maintain the speed limit of 55 mph (89 km/h)). It is not possible to go from westbound I-94 to northbound I-35W, from southbound I-35W to eastbound I-94, and vice versa, without resorting to surface streets.

On I-35E in Minnesota between MN 5 and I-94, in both directions, trucks weighing more than 9,000 pounds (4,100 kg) are banned from the freeway, and the speed limit drops to 45 mph (72 km/h). This section was not completed until the late 1980s (although the route was cleared and graded earlier) due to opposition from the historic Crocus Hill neighborhood, which sits only a few hundred feet from the alignment. The four-lane alignment, "parkway" design was a compromise. The truck bypass for this section is signed on I-494 and I-694 to the east of Saint Paul.

I-35 has an interchange with I-535/US 53 in Duluth, Minnesota, known locally as the "Can of Worms". This junction features a pair of left exits from I-35, a stoplight, and lane drops over the I-35 bridge.

The national northern terminus of I-35 is at an intersection in eastern Duluth. Drivers' options include merging with London Road/MN 61 northbound, proceeding through the stop lights onto 26th Avenue East, or turning left onto London Road southbound.

== History ==
Some portions of I-35 in Oklahoma City were already built in 1953, before the Interstate system was created. Through Norman, Oklahoma, the Interstate opened in June 1959. In Moore, it opened in two parts: the northern half, connecting Moore to Oklahoma City, opened in January 1960. The southern half, linking it to Norman, was opened to traffic in June 1967.

I-35 through Oklahoma largely parallels US 77. This is in large part due to efforts of the towns of Wynnewood, Paoli, and Wayne, which fought to keep I-35 as close as possible to US 77. This was successful due to a threat from Governor Henry Bellmon to build a toll road rather than I-35, and legislation preventing state funds for the Interstate from being spent if it were more than one mile (1.6 km) from the U.S. Route.

I-35 was completed in Oklahoma in 1971, when parts of the Interstate running through Carter Co. and Murray Co. were opened to traffic.

The final segment of I-35 (as originally planned) to open was in north-central Iowa, between Mason City and US 20 near Iowa Falls. This segment was delayed due to some controversy. Originally, I-35 was to follow the alignment of US 69 from Des Moines to the Minnesota border, but Mason City's business community lobbied for the route to be moved closer to their city. On September 1, 1965, the alignment was changed to instead parallel US 65 through northern Iowa, which brought the highway much closer to Mason City. This created a long diagonal section through Wright and Franklin counties. Local farmers objected to their farms being bisected into triangular pieces, and resulting litigation delayed I-35 for several years. A November 1972 ruling rejected a lawsuit filed by the farmers, and the final segment of I-35 was allowed to proceed, eventually opening in 1975.

The Paseo Bridge over the Missouri River in Kansas City, Missouri, was replaced by the dual-span cable-stayed Christopher S. Bond Bridge in December 2010.

=== "NAFTA Superhighway" controversy ===
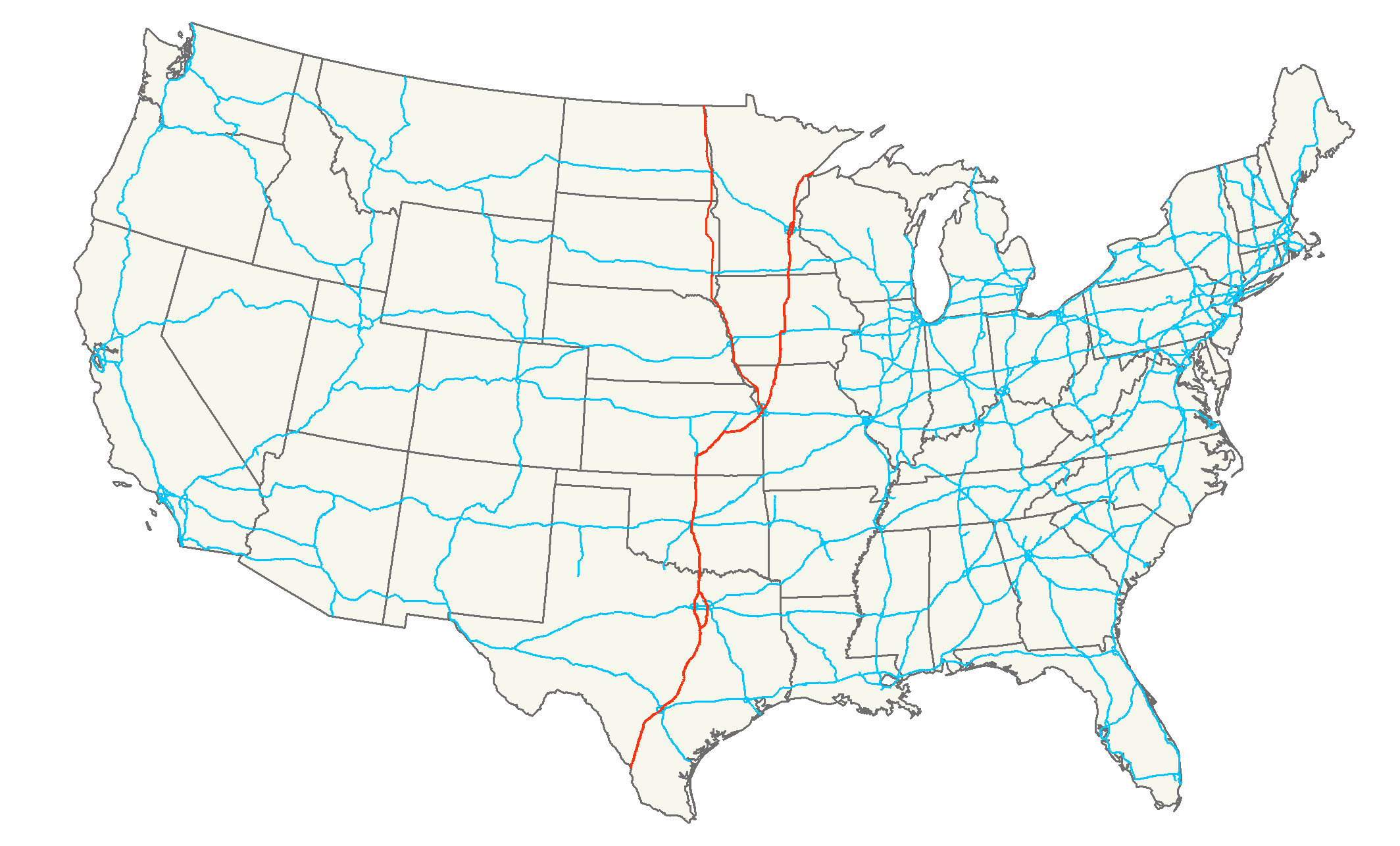
I-29 and I-35

The proposed Trans-Texas Corridor toll-road project included one proposal (TTC-35) to primarily parallel I-35 from the Mexican border up to the Oklahoma border. There are major disagreements as to what impact this parallel route would have on I-35 in terms of traffic, maintenance, and commerce.

The Trans-Texas Corridor was first proposed by Texas Governor Rick Perry in 2002. It consisted of a 1,200-foot (370 m) wide highway that also carried utilities such as electricity, petroleum, and water as well as railway track and fiberoptic cables. In July 2007, US Representative Duncan Hunter successfully offered an amendment to House Resolution 3074, the FY2008 Transportation Appropriations Act, prohibiting the use of federal funds for Department of Transportation participation in the activities of the Security and Prosperity Partnership of North America (SPP). Hunter stated that: "Unfortunately, very little is known about the NAFTA Super Highway. This amendment will provide Congress the opportunity to exercise oversight of the highway, which remains a subject of question and uncertainty, and ensure that our safety and security will not be compromised in order to promote the business interests of our neighbors." Fellow Republican Congressman and presidential candidate Ron Paul brought the issue to mainstream prominence during the December 2007 CNN–YouTube GOP debate, where he rejected the concept and also called it the NAFTA Superhighway after the North American Free Trade Agreement and, like Hunter, framed it within the ultimate goal of creating a North American Union.

In 2011, the Texas Legislature formally repealed its authority for the establishment and operation of the Trans-Texas Corridor with the passage of HB 1201.

== Junction list ==
Southern segment

Texas
US 83 in Laredo; the highways travel concurrently to Botines, approx. 18 miles (29 km) north.
I-69W / US 59 in Laredo
US 57 in Moore
I-410 in San Antonio
I-10 / US 87 / US 90 in San Antonio. I-10/I-35/US 87 travels concurrently through Downtown San Antonio.
I-37 / US 281 in San Antonio
I-410 on the San Antonio–Windcrest city line; concurrency for three miles (4.8 km).
US 290 in Austin; the highways travel concurrently through Austin.
US 183 in Austin
US 79 in Round Rock
I-14 / US 190 in Copperas Cove; US 190 travels concurrently to Belton.
US 77 in Waco; the highways travel concurrently to northeast of Hillsboro; follows route of I-35E afterward.
US 84 on the Waco–Bellmead city line
I-35E / I-35W north-northeast of Hillsboro

Central segment

Texas
I-35E / I-35W in Denton
US 380 in Denton
US 77 in Denton; the highways travel concurrently to south of Thackerville, Oklahoma.
US 82 in Gainesville
Oklahoma
US 70 in Ardmore; the highways travel concurrently through Ardmore.
US 77 north of Springer
US 77 in Davis
US 77 in Norman; the highways travel concurrently to Oklahoma City.
I-240 / US 62 in Oklahoma City; I-35/US 62 travels concurrently through Oklahoma City.
I-40 / I-235 / US 77 / US 270 in Oklahoma City; I-35/I-40/US 270 travels concurrently through Oklahoma City.
I-44 in Oklahoma City; the highways travel concurrently through Oklahoma City.
US 77 in Edmond; the highways travel concurrently to Guthrie.
US 77 in Perry
US 64 in Perry; the highways travel concurrently to north-northwest of Perry.
US 64 / US 412 north-northwest of Perry
US 60 in Tonkawa
US 177 north-northwest of Braman
Kansas
US 166 east-northeast of South Haven
Kansas Turnpike southern terminus in rural Sumner County
US 160 east of Wellington
I-135 in Wichita
US 54 / US 400 in Wichita
US 77 north of El Dorado
I-335 / Kansas Turnpike in Emporia
US 50 in Emporia
US 50 east of Emporia; the highways travel concurrently to Lenexa.
US 75 south-southeast of Olivet
US 59 in Ottawa; the highways travel concurrently to east-northeast of Ottawa.
US 56 in Gardner; the highways travel concurrently to Merriam.
US 169 in Olathe; the highways travel concurrently to Merriam.
I-435 / US 50 in Lenexa
US 69 in Lenexa; the highways travel concurrently to Merriam.
I-635 / US 69 in Mission; I-35/US 69 travels concurrently to Kansas City.
US 169 in Kansas City
Missouri
I-670 in Kansas City
I-70 / US 24 / US 40 / US 169 in Kansas City; the highways travel concurrently through Kansas City.
I-29 / I-70 / US 40 / US 71 in Kansas City; I-29/I-35/US 71 travels concurrently through Kansas City.
US 69 in Kansas City
I-435 in Claycomo
US 69 in Pleasant Valley; the highways travel concurrently to Liberty.
US 69 south of Cameron
US 36 in Cameron
US 69 southwest of Winston
US 69 north-northwest of Altamont
US 136 in Bethany
Iowa
US 69 on the Iowa state line south of Lamoni
US 34 in Osceola
I-80 / I-235 in West Des Moines; I-35/I-80 travels concurrently to Ankeny.
US 6 on the Clive–Urbandale city line
US 69 in Des Moines
I-80 / I-235 in Ankeny
US 30 southeast of Ames
US 20 southeast of Blairsburg
US 18 south-southeast of Clear Lake; the highways travel concurrently to Clear Lake.
Minnesota
US 65 southeast of Albert Lea
US 65 in Albert Lea
I-90 northeast of Albert Lea
US 14 / US 218 in Owatonna
I-35E / I-35W in Burnsville

Northern segment

Minnesota
I-35E / I-35W in Columbus
US 8 in Forest Lake
US 61 in Wyoming
US 2 in Duluth; the highways travel concurrently through Duluth.
I-535 / US 53 in Duluth
MN 61 in Duluth
