= Farm to Market Road 1472 =

State road in Webb County, Texas, United States

Farm to Market Road 1472
- Mines Road

Route information
- Maintained by TxDOT
- Length: 33.4 mi (53.8 km)
- Existed: 1955–present

Major junctions
- South end: I-35 / US 83 in Laredo
- I-69W / US 59 / Loop 20; SH 255
- North end: A point 14.7 miles (23.7 km) northwest of SH 255

Location
- Country: United States
- State: Texas
- Counties: Webb

Highway system
- Highways in Texas; Interstate; US; State; Former; Toll; Loops; Spurs; FM/RM; Park; Rec
← FM 1471	→ FM 1473

Farm to Market Road 1472 (FM 1472) is a farm-to-market road in the U.S. state of Texas that connects the industrial area of Laredo to the Laredo–Colombia Solidarity International Bridge, and then runs roughly parallel to the Rio Grande into rural Webb County. In the urban sections of Laredo, it is a six-lane route known locally as Mines Road.

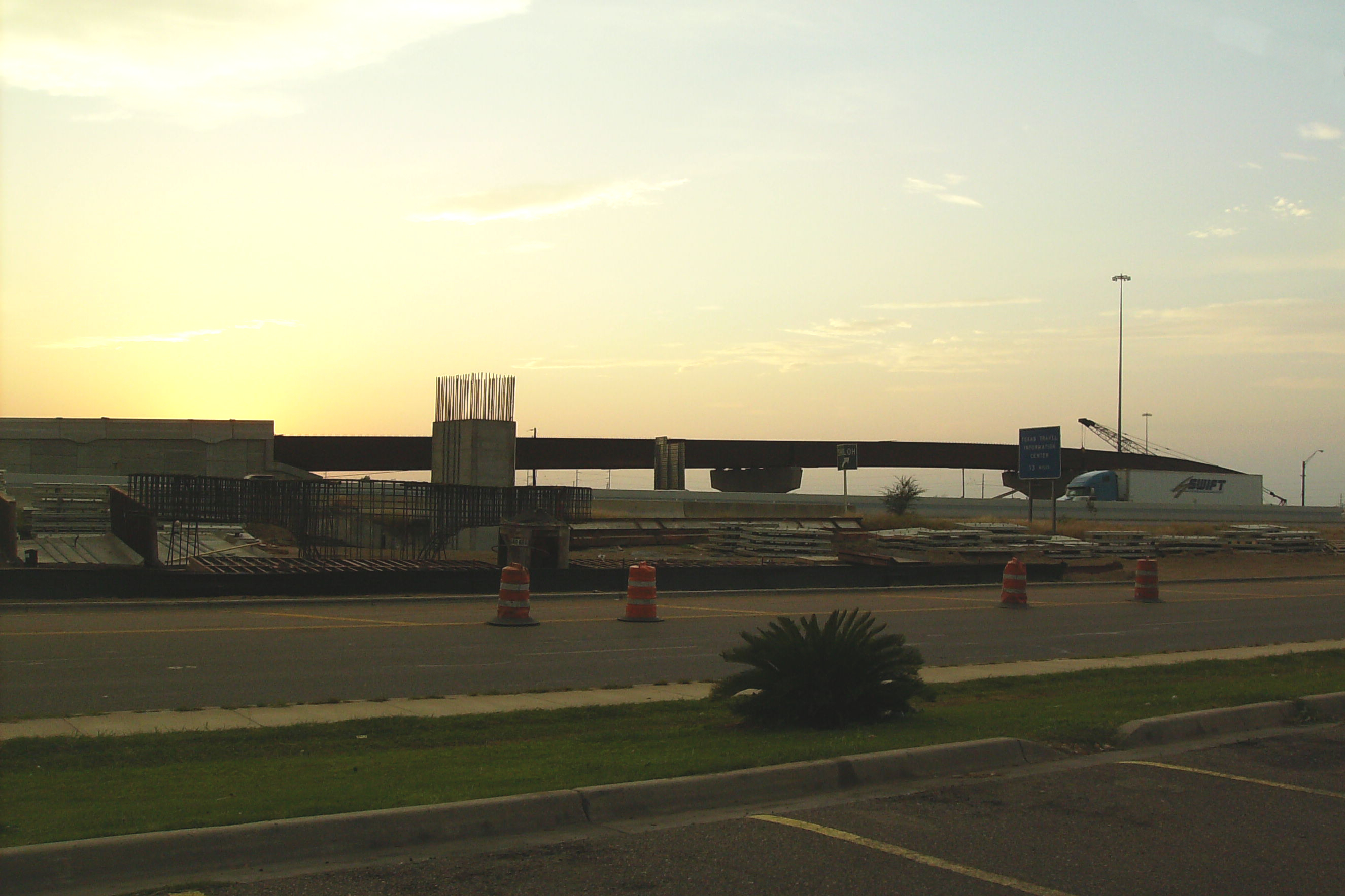
Construction of the I-35/US 83 and FM 1472 intersection

== Route description ==
The southern terminus of FM 1472 is in Laredo, at I-35 exit 4. The route travels to the north and crosses I-69W/US 59/Loop 20 just east of the World Trade International Bridge. It then takes a northwesterly route, paralleling the Rio Grande. It has a junction with SH 255, the former Camino Colombia Toll Road, near the Laredo city limits. The route continues through unincorporated Webb County before reaching the end of its designation north of Carricitos Creek. The unimproved roadway continues as Eagle Pass Road, which becomes the paved FM 1021 after crossing into Maverick County.

== History ==
A previous route numbered FM 1472 was designated on July 20, 1948 from US 82 in Crosbyton to Wake School in Crosby County. This route was cancelled and combined with FM 28 on November 1, 1954.

The current FM 1472 was designated on April 1, 1955 from the junction of what was then US 81 to the community of Dolores, a distance of 17.8 miles (28.6 km). The designation was extended four times: by 6.1 miles (9.8 km) on May 2, 1962, by 4.0 miles (6.4 km) on November 26, 1969, by another 4.0 miles (6.4 km) on November 5, 1971, and an additional 2.0 miles (3.2 km) on October 21, 1981 to its current length. The portion of the route between I-35 and SH 255 was officially redesignated Urban Road 1472 (UR 1472) on June 27, 1995 due to the growth of the Laredo urban area and the construction of the Laredo–Colombia Solidarity International Bridge northwest of the city. The designation of this segment reverted to FM 1472 with the elimination of the Urban Road system on November 15, 2018.

== Major intersections ==
The entire route is in Webb County.

Location	mi	km	Destinations	Notes
Laredo	0.0	0.0	I-35 / US 83 – San Antonio, McAllen	I-35 exit 4A; southern terminus
Laredo	2.2	3.5	I-69W / US 59 / Loop 20 (Bob Bullock Loop) – World Trade Bridge	I-69W exit 1
Laredo	7.4	11.9	FM 3338 (Las Tiendas Road)	
Laredo	18.8	30.3	SH 255 (Camino Colombia Road) – Colombia Solidarity Bridge	
	33.4	53.8	Eagle Pass Road	Northern terminus and continuation
1.000 mi = 1.609 km; 1.000 km = 0.621 mi
