= Texas State Highway 255 =

State highway in Texas

State Highway 255
- Camino Colombia Road
- SH 255, highlighted in red

Route information
- Maintained by TxDOT
- Length: 22.451 mi (36.131 km)
- Existed: 2004–present

Major junctions
- West end: Colombia Solidarity International Bridge at the Mexican border
- US 83 near Laredo
- East end: I-35 near Laredo

Location
- Country: United States
- State: Texas
- Counties: Webb

Highway system
- Highways in Texas; Interstate; US; State; Former; Toll; Loops; Spurs; FM/RM; Park; Rec
← SH 254	→ SH 256

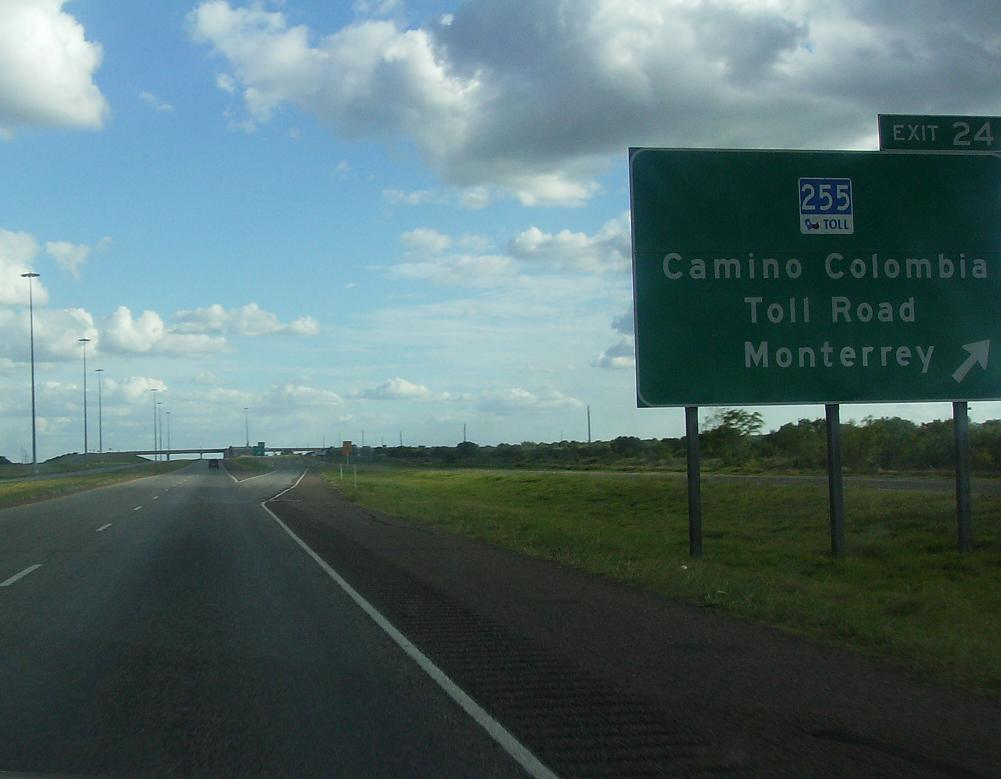
I-35 Interchange

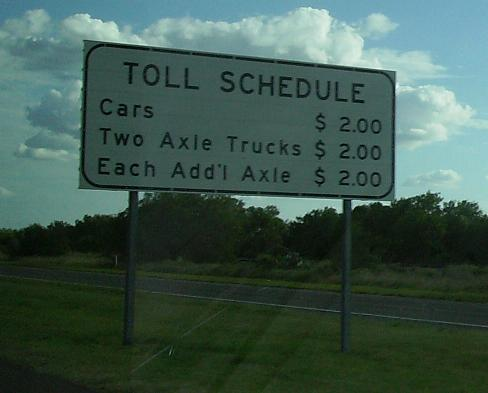
Toll rates as seen on I-35 south in 2008

State Highway 255 (SH 255) is state highway in the U.S. state of Texas that allows international traffic to bypass Laredo. Located in Webb County, the highway provides a connection between the Laredo–Colombia Solidarity International Bridge to Interstate 35 (I-35). The route opened in 2000 as the Camino Colombia Toll Road, and was one of the few operating toll roads in the United States to have gone through the legal process of foreclosure. The toll designation was removed from the route in 2017.

== Route description ==
SH 255 begins at the Laredo–Colombia Solidarity International Bridge on the Mexico–United States border. From the Laredo Colombia Solidarity Port of Entry, SH 255 heads northeast as a four-lane divided highway and crosses FM 1472 (Mines Road). It then merges down to a two-lane road just west of the former toll barrier. SH 255 continues northeast to an intersection at FM 3338 (Las Tiendas Road) and a diamond interchange with US 83. It continues to the northeast to its eastern terminus at I-35 exit 24. Although the portion from the Mexican border to FM 1472 is officially part of SH 255, it is still signed as FM 255.

== History ==
=== Previous route ===
A previous route numbered SH 255 was designated on October 26, 1937, beginning in Bremond and traveling southeast via Franklin and Wheelock to SH OSR. This route was cancelled on April 29, 1942, and the section south of one mile north of Wheelock became FM 46.

=== Current route ===
The route was originally approved in 1997 as a privately owned toll route for mainly truck traffic to bypass the city of Laredo for traffic congestion. The route was opened as the Camino Colombia Toll Road in October 2000, at a cost of approximately $90 million. SH 255 inherited its number from FM 255, which was designated on the route between the border crossing and FM 1472 on January 30, 1989. The SH 255 designation was extended over this segment on June 30, 2005.

In August 2001, landowners that were shareholders of the route filed a lawsuit, claiming that profits and traffic usage were less than expected. The failure of the route was attributed to the price for truck traffic ($16), the continuation of U.S. government policies banning Mexican trucks from the interior of the United States (which had been expected to be abolished under the North American Free Trade Agreement), and the approval of a new freeway connecting route from the World Trade International Bridge crossing along Loop 20 to Interstate 35.

The toll road was foreclosed on late in 2003 and was purchased at auction on January 6, 2004, by its main creditor, the John Hancock Life Insurance Company, for the minimum $12 million, one-sixth of the construction value. The only other bidder was the Texas Department of Transportation at $11.1 million. The route was subsequently closed to all traffic. On May 27, 2004, TxDOT purchased the route from John Hancock for a negotiated $20 million, and reopened the route in September, dropping the toll to $2.00 for cars and $2.00 per additional axle.

Signage used when SH 255 was tolled from 2004 to 2017.

On June 1, 2009, cash collection was discontinued and the use of the TxTag electronic toll collection system (or the interoperable EZ TAG and TollTag system) became mandatory. Unlike other TxDOT-operated toll roads, there was no pay-by-mail option, although the option to set up a prepaid day pass account was provided. Motorists were also able to use Laredo Trade Tags if they were connected to a TxTag account.

During the 2017 Texas legislative session, language was added to Senate Bill 312 that disallowed TxDOT from continuing to operate the route as a toll project. The bill was passed by both the Texas Senate and Texas House of Representatives on May 30, 2017, was signed by the governor on June 9, 2017, and took effect September 1, 2017.

== Major intersections ==
The entire route is in Webb County.

Location	mi	km	Destinations	Notes
Rio Grande	0.0	0.0	Laredo–Colombia Solidarity International Bridge – Mexico Border	Western terminus; continues as Nuevo Leon State Highway Spur 1
Laredo	0.2	0.32	Laredo Colombia Solidarity Port of Entry	
Laredo	1.3	2.1	FM 1472 – Laredo, San Antonio	At-grade intersection
Laredo	1.9	3.1	Las Minas Boulevard	At-grade intersection
	3.7	6.0	Port Industrial Boulevard	At-grade intersection
	4.7	7.6	CCTR Admin Building	
	8.2	13.2	FM 3338 south	At-grade intersection; northern terminus of FM 3338
	8.7	14.0	Camino Colombia Automated Gantry (18 feet (5.5 m) clearance, no longer tolled as of September 1, 2017)	
	17.9	28.8	Jefferies Road	At-grade intersection
	19.3	31.1	US 83 – Laredo, Carrizo Springs	Interchange
	22.7	36.5	I-35 – Laredo, San Antonio	Eastern terminus; exit 24 on I-35
1.000 mi = 1.609 km; 1.000 km = 0.621 mi: Closed/former; Tolled
