= Colombia, Nuevo León =

Planned community in Nuevo León, Mexico

Colombia
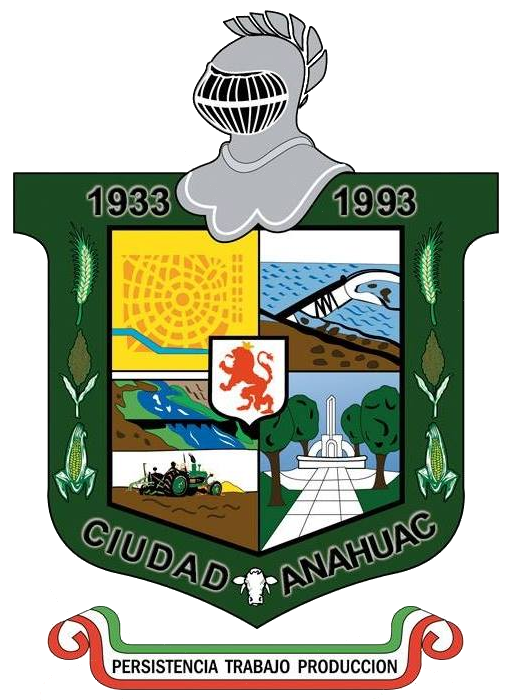
- Coat of arms
- Motto: Produccion y Progreso
- Interactive map of Colombia
- Coordinates: 27°42′12″N 99°45′34″W
- Country: Mexico
- State: Nuevo León
- Municipality: Anáhuac Municipality
- Founded: 1992

Government
  - Federal electoral district: Nuevo León's 13th
- Elevation: 150 m (490 ft)

Population (2010 census)
  - Total: 514
- Time zone: UTC–06:00 (Zona Centro)
  - Summer (DST): UTC–05:00 (DST)
- Postal code: 65000
- Area code: 867

Colombia is a planned community founded in 1992 by the Mexican state of Nuevo León in the Anáhuac Municipality, situated on the southern bank of the Río Grande across from Laredo, Texas, United States. The community is connected to Laredo via the Laredo–Colombia Solidarity International Bridge. According to the 2010 census, the community had a population of 514.

== History ==
It was founded on the Nuevo León-Texas border to compete with the neighboring Mexican states of Coahuila and Tamaulipas in the import-export market. One year after its founding the Laredo–Colombia Solidarity International Bridge was opened. Colombia was named in honor of Christopher Columbus, since it was founded 500 years after he first came into contact with the Americas.
