= Texas State Highway Spur 260 =

State highway spur in Laredo, Texas, United States

State Highway Spur 260
- Jaime Zapata Memorial Highway

Route information
- Maintained by TxDOT
- Length: 1.61 mi (2.59 km)
- Existed: May 25, 2008–present

Major junctions
- South end: US 83 in Laredo
- North end: SH 359 / Loop 20 in Laredo

Location
- Country: United States
- State: Texas
- Counties: Webb

Highway system
- Highways in Texas; Interstate; US; State; Former; Toll; Loops; Spurs; FM/RM; Park; Rec
| ← Spur 259 | → Spur 261 |

State Highway Spur 260 (Spur 260), also known as Jaime Zapata Memorial Highway, is a state highway in southeastern Laredo, Texas, United States, that connect U.S. Route 83 (US 83) with Texas State Highway 359 (SH 359) and northbound Texas State Highway Loop 20 (Loop 20). The route was designated in 2008 but continued to be signed as part of Loop 20 until the opening of Cuatro Vientos Road in July 2011, when the Loop 20 designation was shifted to the new route. The contemporary Spur 260 constitutes the original extent of Loop 20, as originally designated in 1939.

== Route description ==
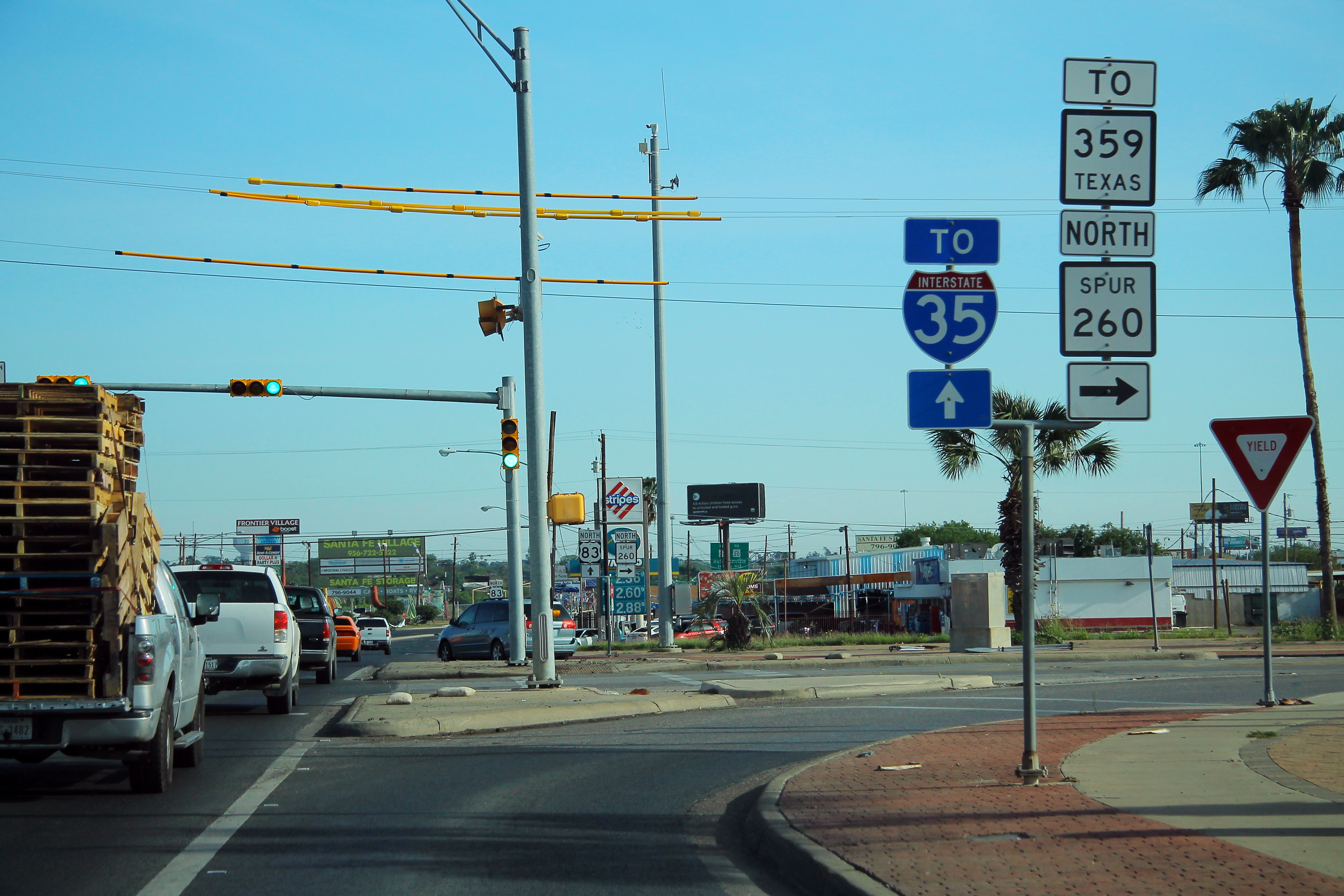
Northbound on US 83 at the southern end of Spur 260, April 2019

Spur 260 begins at an intersection with US 83 and Ross Street. The route continues east-northeast to Ejido Avenue with commercial development on both sides. Past Ejido Avenue, commercial businesses continue to flank the south side of the road, while the north side is undeveloped until the intersection with Los Presidentes Avenue. From there, the north side of the highway becomes more industrial, while the south side continues to serve commercial buildings. Spur 260 turns north before reaching its eastern terminus at SH 359 and the Loop 20 frontage road, with the main lanes of Loop 20 passing overhead.

== History ==
The number originally belonged to Loop 260, designated on August 20, 1952, from US 80 via Fort Worth Avenue and Commerce Street to US 80. On June 25, 1991, Loop 260 was cancelled and removed from the state highway system. On August 28, 1991, the section of US 80 along Davis Street and Zang Boulevard was removed from the state highway system.

== Junction list ==
The entire route is in Laredo, Webb County.

| mi | km | Destinations | Notes |
|---|---|---|---|
| 0.00 | 0.00 | Ross Street west | Continuation west from southern terminus |
| 0.00 | 0.00 | US 83 north (Zapata Highway) – Encinal, San Antonio US 83 south (Zapata Highway) – Zapata, Rio Grande City | Southern terminus |
| 1.61 | 2.59 | SH 359 east – US 83 SH 359 west – Hebbronville | Northern terminus |
| 1.61 | 2.59 | Loop 20 north (Bob Bullock Loop) | Partial interchange, northbound only |
1.000 mi = 1.609 km; 1.000 km = 0.621 mi: Incomplete access

== See also ==
- List of state highway spurs in Texas
