= Gateway to the Americas International Bridge =

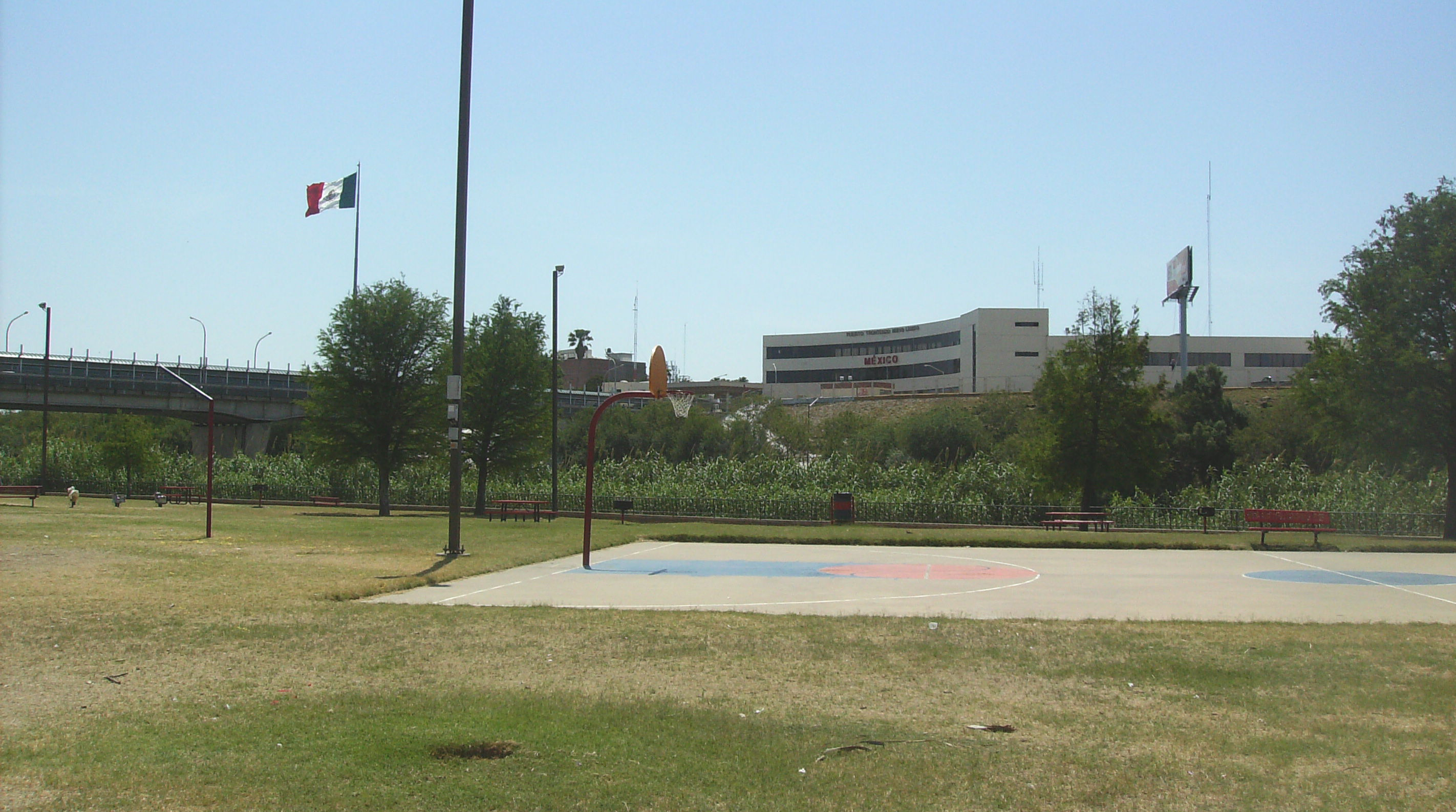
- View of the Gateway to the Americas International Bridge Mexican side
- Coordinates: 27°29′58″N 99°30′27″W
- Carries: Pedestrian; Non-commercial Vehicles
- Crosses: Rio Grande
- Locale: Laredo, Texas – Nuevo Laredo, Tamaulipas
- Official name: Gateway to the Americas International Bridge
- Other name: Laredo International Bridge 1
- Maintained by: City of Laredo; Secretariat of Communication and Transportation

Characteristics
- Design: Box Girder Bridge
- Total length: 1050 ft (309 m)
- Width: 42 ft (12.8 m)

History
- Opened: 1954

Statistics
- Daily traffic: Pedestrians: 11,398; Non-commercial: 2,311
- Toll: Non-Commercial Vehicles $1.75/axle (southbound); 30 pesos (northbound) Pedestrians $1.00 (southbound); 5 pesos (northbound)
- U.S. Inspection Station – Laredo, Texas
- U.S. National Register of Historic Places
- Location within Texas Location within the United States
- MPS: U.S. Border Inspection Stations MPS
- NRHP reference No.: 14000600
- Added to NRHP: September 10, 2014

Location
- Interactive map of Gateway to the Americas International Bridge

The Gateway to the Americas International Bridge is one of four vehicular international bridges located in the cities of Laredo, Texas, and Nuevo Laredo, Tamaulipas, that connect the United States and Mexico over the Rio Grande (Río Bravo). It is owned and operated by the City of Laredo and the Secretaría de Comunicaciones y Transportes (Mexico's federal Secretariat of Communication and Transportation). It is also known as Laredo International Bridge 1.

== Description ==
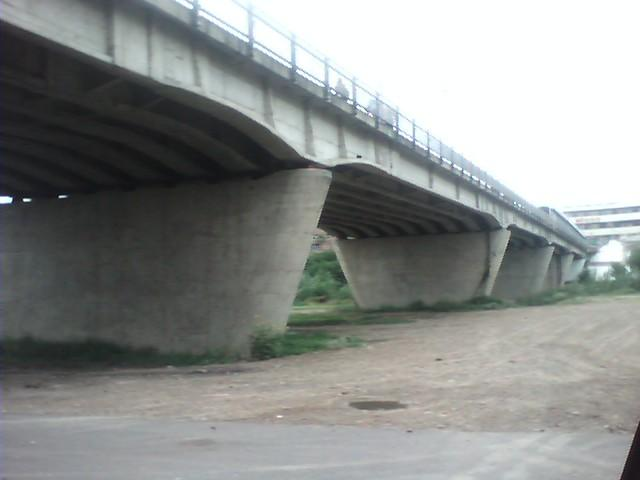
View of the bridge from below

The Gateway to the Americas International Bridge is a four-lane bridge with two pedestrian walkways and is 1,050 feet (320 m) long and 42 feet (13 m) wide. The bridge is also known as the Convent Street Bridge, Laredo International Bridge, Bridge Number One, Old Bridge, Laredo-Nuevo Laredo Bridge 1, Puente Nuevo Laredo, Puente Laredo I, and Puente Viejo.

== Location ==
This bridge is located in the San Agustin Historical District in Downtown Laredo on the United States Side and on the northern terminus of Mexican Federal Highway 85 in downtown Nuevo Laredo, Tamaulipas. It operates 24 hours a day for pedestrian traffic from and to Mexico. Renovations at the bridge lasting from April 2016 to October 2017 are finished and vehicular transit is resumed.

== Border crossing ==
The Laredo Convent Avenue Port of Entry is located at the Gateway to the Americas International Bridge. Since 1889, a bridge connected Laredo, Texas with Nuevo Laredo, Tamaulipas at this location. For many years, this was the only crossing for vehicular and pedestrian traffic between the two cities.

The U.S. Inspection Station building that was built in 1943 was listed on the U.S. National Register of Historic Places in 1992.

Since 2018, all vehicles crossing from Mexico to the U.S. through this bridge is now for SENTRI holders only. All other vehicles have to cross through the Juárez–Lincoln International Bridge or through the Laredo–Colombia Solidarity International Bridge. Pedestrial crossing remains unchanged.

== History ==
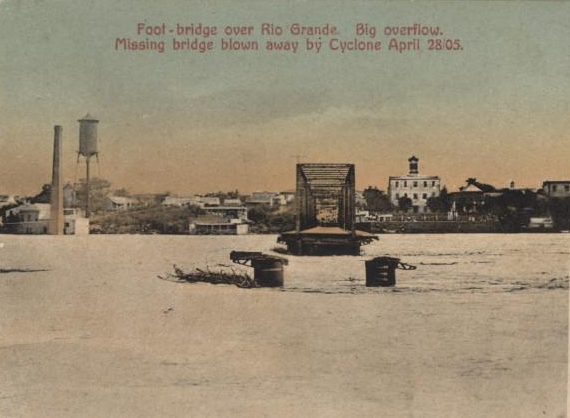
Laredo Foot Bridge Destroyed in 1905

In 1889, eight years after the first railroad bridge was constructed connecting two cities, the "Foot and Wagon Bridge" was built, enabling pedestrians and horse-drawn carriages to cross the border. The bridge used a through truss design.

This bridge was destroyed by a tornado and subsequent flood in 1905, and again by a mysterious fire in 1920. It was destroyed again by a flood in 1932.. ring each reconstruction, temporary pontoon bridges were built to accommodate traffic.

The city of Laredo and the Mexican government rebuilt the bridge to accommodate vehicles in 1932, surviving 22 years before it was destroyed again by flood in 1954. The current bridge was constructed in 1954 and operational in 1956, has survived flooding with no damage and remains operational. The construction of the [[[Amistad Dam]] in 1969 has mitigated the effect of subsequent flooding conditions. The city of Laredo purchased the American side of the international bridge for $695,000 in 1946 from a private owner.

== See also ==
- List of international bridges in North America
