= Christopher S. Bond Bridge (Kansas City, Missouri) =

Cable-stayed bridge across the Missouri River in Missouri

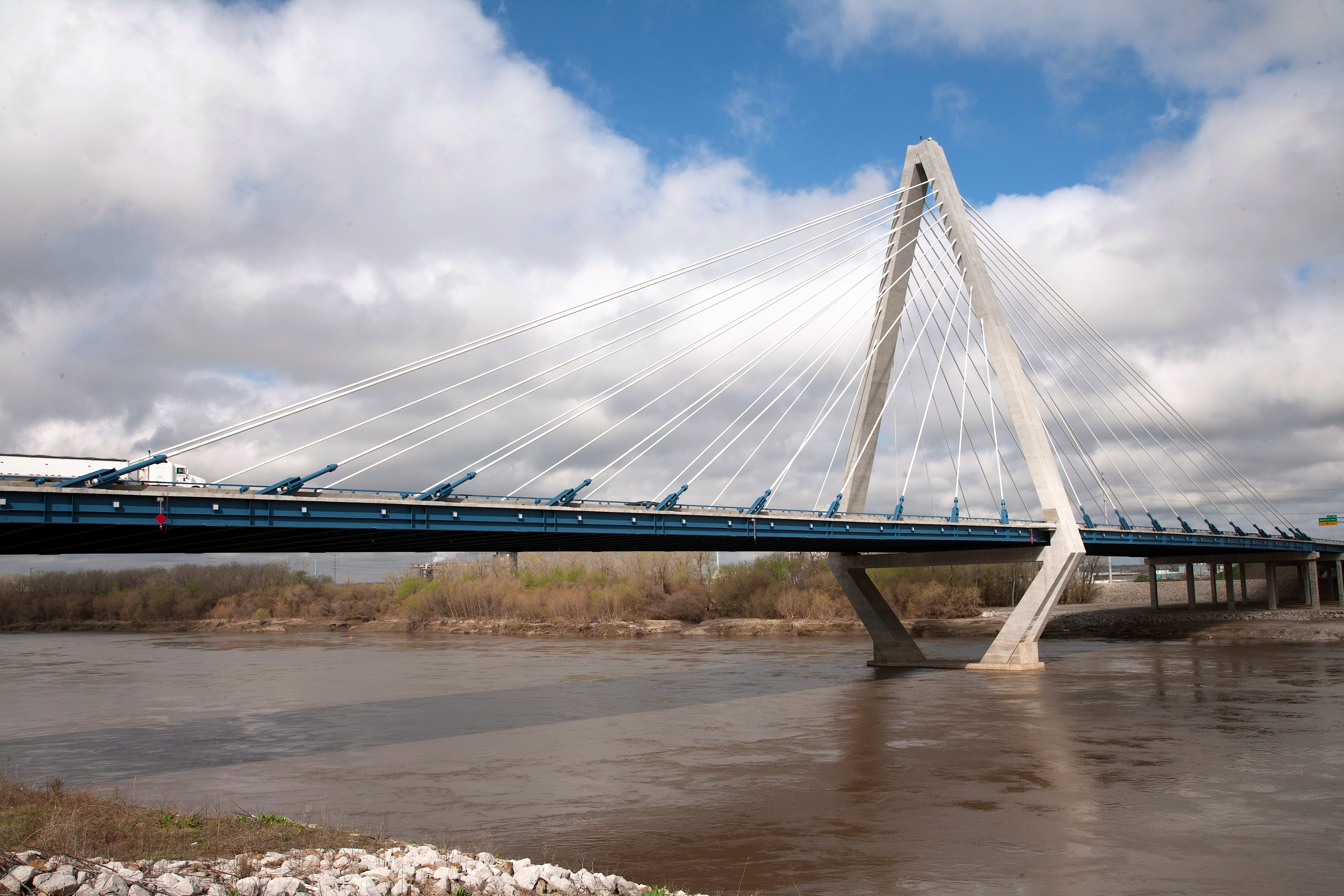
- The bridge in 2012
- Coordinates: 39°07′29.70″N 94°34′03.30″W
- Carries: 6 lanes of I-29 / I-35 / US 71 + 1 auxiliary lane for northbound vehicle traffic.
- Crosses: Missouri River
- Locale: Kansas City, Missouri
- Official name: Christopher S. Bond Bridge
- Maintained by: MoDOT

Characteristics
- Design: Single tower cable-stay

History
- Opened: September 27, 2010; 15 years ago

Location
- Interactive map of Christopher S. Bond Bridge

The Christopher S. Bond Bridge in Kansas City, Missouri (often referred to as the New Paseo Bridge) is a cable-stayed bridge across the Missouri River. It carries Interstates 29 and 35, and U.S. Route 71. The bridge opened in 2010, replacing the Paseo Bridge.

The bridge is named for Christopher "Kit" Bond, the former Missouri Governor and United States Senator.

== Overview ==
The new Christopher S. Bond Missouri River Bridge is a dual-span cable-stayed bridge, anchored by a 260-foot (79 m) tall delta-shaped pylon. The pylon rises 316 feet (96 m) above the Missouri River.

== History ==
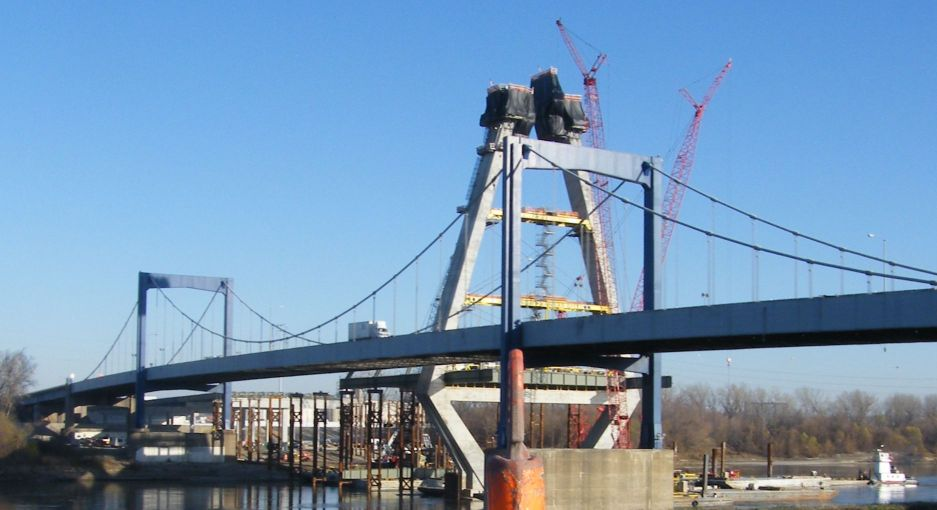
The bridge was under construction in 2009, behind the now-demolished Paseo Bridge.

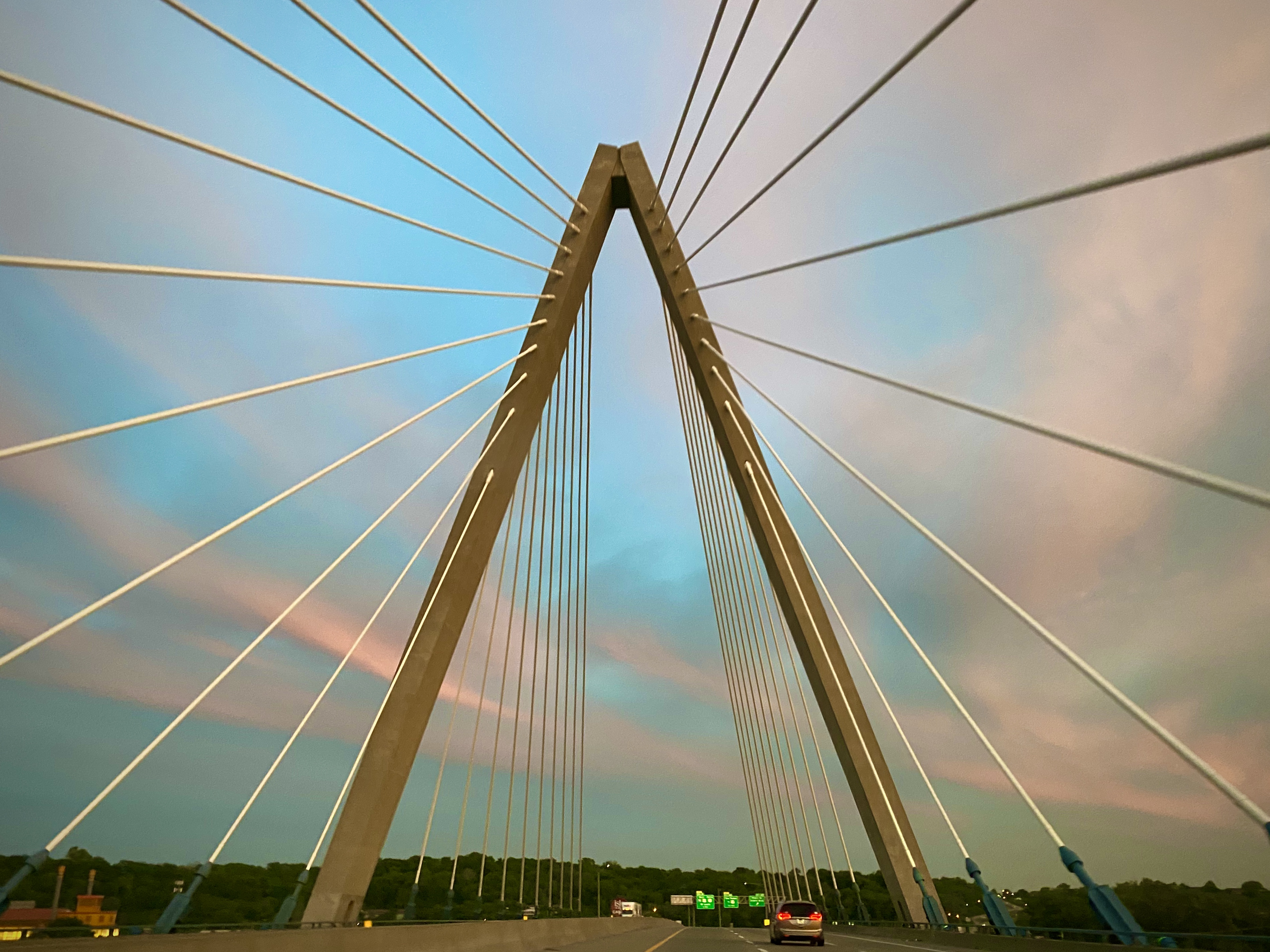
Deck of the bridge in 2020

On November 14, 2007, MoDOT announced plans for a complete replacement of the Paseo Bridge. The new bridge increased the roadway capacity from two lanes each direction to three lanes southbound on the bridge and 4 lanes northbound on the bridge, one northbound lane being an auxiliary lane. The bridge is designed to have four through lanes each way at a future date without needing to widen the bridge.

In December 2007, the Federal Aviation Administration warned that the pylon might interfere with traffic at Kansas City Downtown Airport, 1 mile (1.6 km) to the west. In August 2008, the FAA altered flight procedures at the airport to give planes more than 700 feet (210 m) of clearance above the pylon. Construction on the Bond bridge began in April 2008, just downstream of the Paseo bridge. This allowed the Paseo bridge to remain open to traffic during construction. With the opening of the Bond bridge, demolition of the Paseo bridge started, and was completed on July 1, 2011.

The bridge is part of a $245 million project that upgraded an approximately 2-mile (3.2 km) section of the I-29/I-35 corridor to six lanes. The contractor is Paseo Corridor Constructors (PCC), a joint venture team composed of Clarkson Construction Company, Massman Construction Co., and Kiewit Construction Co. The bridge was designed by Parsons Corporation and Bradley Touchstone of the DodStone Group of Tallahassee, Florida was the bridge architect. The firm also designed the John James Audubon Bridge in Louisiana, which is the longest cable-stayed bridge in North America.

The bridge opened to limited traffic on September 27, 2010, and all lanes opened on December 18, 2010.

== See also ==
- List of crossings of the Missouri River
