= World Trade International Bridge =

Bridge linking the US and Mexico

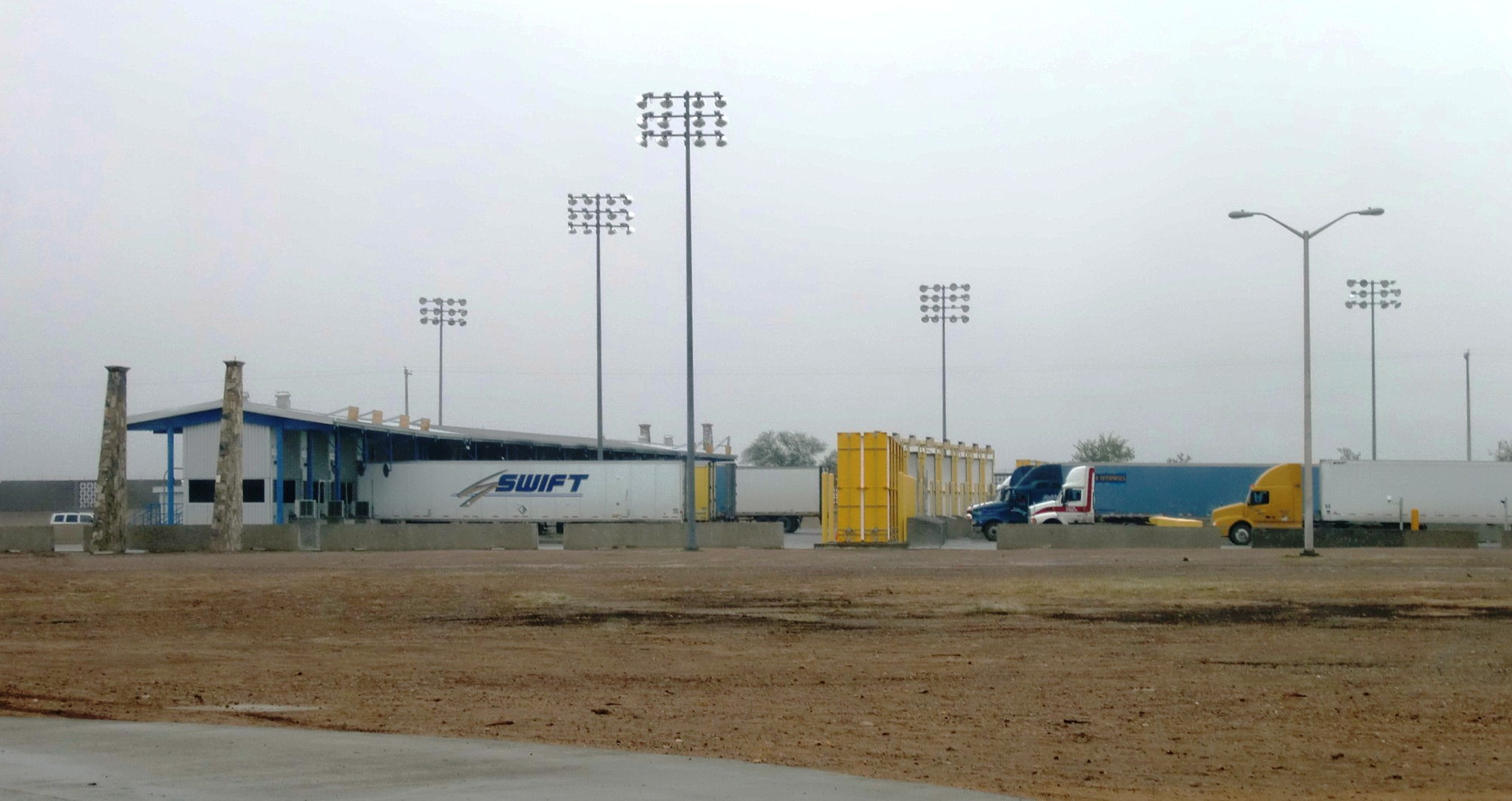
- Laredo International Bridge 4
- Coordinates: 27.597291°N 99.537119°W
- Carries: Commercial Vehicles Only; Highways: Loop 20; I-69W; US 59; Fed. 85D
- Crosses: Rio Grande
- Locale: Laredo, Texas – Nuevo Laredo, Tamaulipas
- Official name: World Trade International Bridge
- Other name: Laredo International Bridge 4
- Maintained by: City of Laredo; Secretariat of Communication and Transportation
- Website: www.cbp.gov/contact/ports/laredo-texas-2304

Characteristics
- Design: Box Girder Bridge
- Total length: 977 ft (343 m)
- Width: 262 ft (80 m)

History
- Opened: 2000

Statistics
- Daily traffic: Commercial: 3,579
- Toll: Commercial Vehicles $4.75/axle (southbound); 60 pesos (northbound)

Location
- Interactive map of World Trade International Bridge

The World Trade International Bridge is one of four international bridges located in the cities of Laredo, Texas, and Nuevo Laredo, Tamaulipas, that connect the United States and Mexico over the Rio Grande (Río Bravo). It is owned and operated by City of Laredo and the Secretaría de Comunicaciones y Transportes (Mexico's federal Secretariat of Communication and Transportation). It is also known as Laredo International Bridge 4.

== History ==
The World Trade International Bridge's construction started on September 30, 1998, and the bridge was completed on April 15, 2000. The international bridge was named in honor of a free World Trade market, because international trade is one of the key components to the Laredo / Nuevo Laredo economies. The World Trade International Bridge was built to alleviate traffic congestion in Interstate 35 south through Laredo, Texas since most commercial traffic could only cross through the one lane dedicated to commercial vehicles at Juarez-Lincoln International Bridge or the further north Colombia-Solidarity International Bridge in Nuevo León.

In 2023, the Port of Laredo was the top international trade port in the U.S.

== Description ==
The World Trade International Bridge is a fourteen-lane bridge. The bridge is 977 feet (298 m) long and 262 feet (80 m) wide. The international bridge is for commercial traffic only. The bridge is also known as Laredo North, Bridge 4, Laredo IV, Puente Internacional Nuevo Laredo III and Puente del Comercio Mundial Nuevo Laredo III.
The World Trade International Bridge is Nuevo Laredo's third international bridge and Laredo's fourth since Laredo's third (Laredo International Bridge 3) is located at the Nuevo León/Texas border.

== Plans ==
The City of Laredo was talking to the Mexican Government about expanding the World Trade International Bridge by adding nine more lanes by 2012, in order to cut down delays of the movement of goods.

== Location ==
This bridge is located at the western termini of Interstate 69W, U.S. Route 59, and Loop 20 in Laredo, Texas. It is also in north Nuevo Laredo, Tamaulipas at the Mexican Federal Highway 85D's northern terminus.

== Border crossing ==
The Laredo World Trade Port of Entry was built in 2000 in an effort to relieve traffic from the congested downtown Laredo bridges. All of Laredo's cross-border commercial vehicle traffic uses this Port of Entry, as the other Laredo bridges prohibit trucks. Passenger vehicles and pedestrians are not permitted to use this crossing.

== See also ==
- List of international bridges in North America
