= Paseo Bridge =

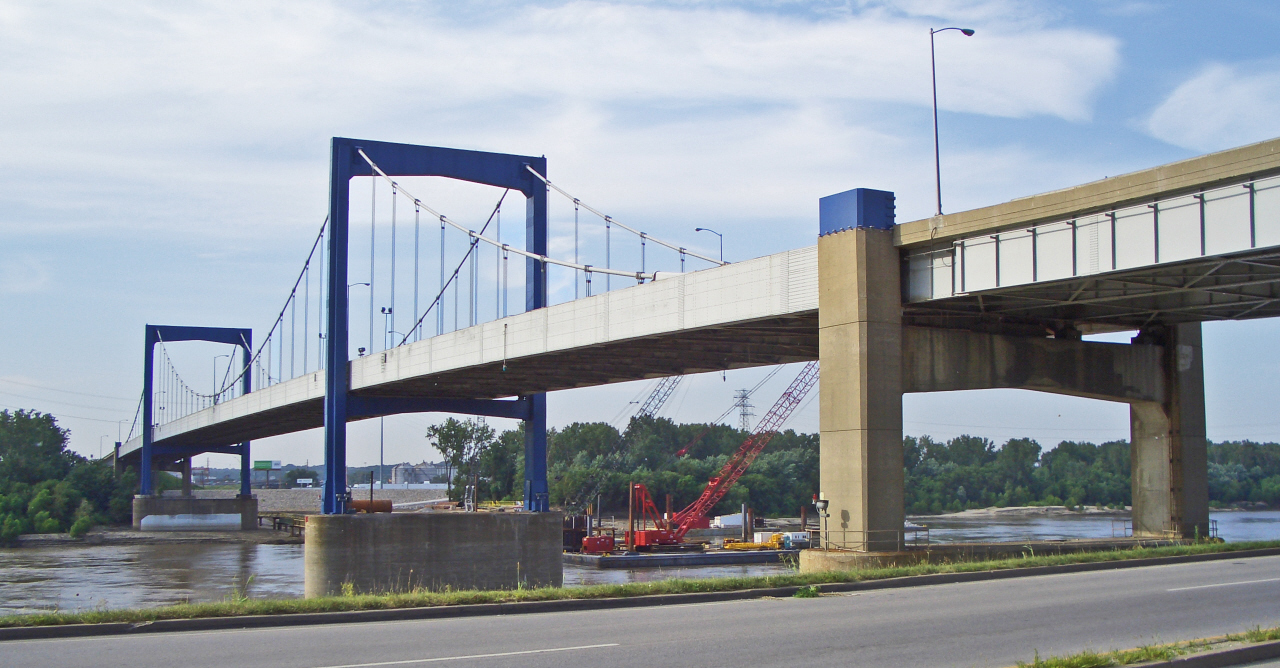
- The bridge in 2008
- Coordinates: 39°07′22″N 94°33′57″W
- Carries: 4 lanes of I-29 / I-35 / US 71
- Crosses: Missouri River
- Locale: Kansas City, Missouri
- Official name: Paseo Bridge
- Maintained by: MoDOT
- ID number: 6674

Characteristics
- Design: Suspension
- Longest span: 616.0 feet

History
- Opened: August 13, 1954; 70 years ago
- Closed: November 19, 2010; 14 years ago

The Paseo Bridge was a suspension bridge over the Missouri River in Kansas City, Missouri. Before being replaced by the Christopher S. Bond Bridge, it carried Interstates 29 and 35 and U.S. Route 71 over the river. It was named for The Paseo, a boulevard that connected with the bridge to the south, and continues to do so with the Bond Bridge.

== History ==
The bridge was built in 1954 and was rehabilitated in 1984 and 2005. According to the Missouri Department of Transportation, the bridge handled 95,000 vehicles a day before its retirement, making it the most used bridge in Kansas City. The Paseo Bridge also served as the main connection between Kansas City and the Northland (the area of Kansas City north of the Missouri River). In its early history it was a toll bridge and the toll was 10 cents per trip.

At the time it was built, it was the longest self anchored suspension bridge ever constructed worldwide and one of a small number of such bridges.

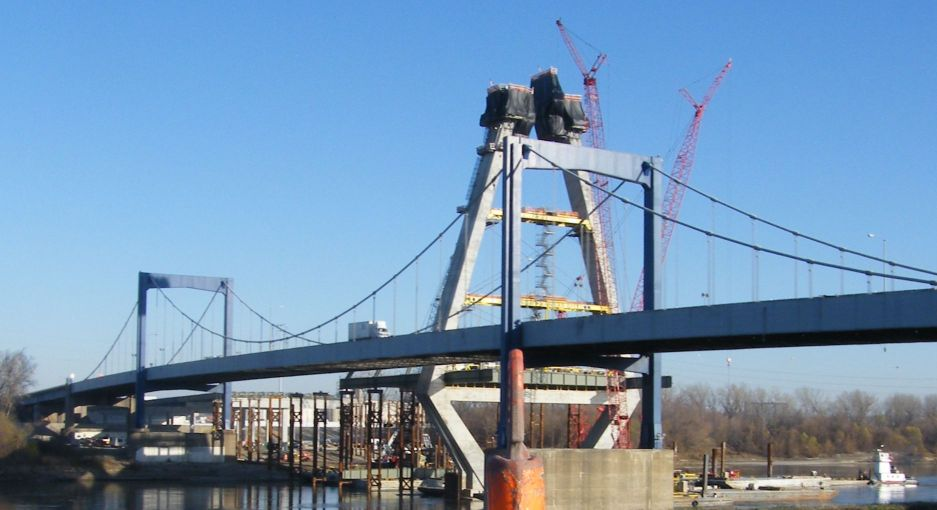
The bridge and its downstream replacement in December 2009

MoDOT replaced the bridge in 2010 with the Christopher S. Bond Bridge. Construction of the new cable-stayed bridge began in April 2008 and was completed several months ahead of schedule. The Paseo Bridge was open to traffic during the construction, gradually shifting the flow onto the new Bond Bridge until all lanes of the new bridge were open. Vehicle traffic across the Paseo Bridge ceased on November 19, 2010, and demolition work on the bridge began shortly thereafter.

== See also ==
- List of bridges documented by the Historic American Engineering Record in Missouri
- List of crossings of the Missouri River
