= Interstate 69W =

Interstate Highway in South Texas

Interstate 69W
- I-69W Future or proposed segments

Route information
- Auxiliary route of I-69
- Maintained by TxDOT
- Length: 1.436 mi (2.311 km)
- Existed: June 26, 2014–present
- NHS: Entire route

Major junctions
- South end: World Trade Bridge Port of Entry in Laredo
- I-35 / US 83 in Laredo
- North end: US 59 / Loop 20 in Laredo

Location
- Country: United States
- State: Texas
- Counties: Webb

Highway system
- Interstate Highway System; Main; Auxiliary; Suffixed; Business; Future; Highways in Texas; Interstate; US; State; Former; Toll; Loops; Spurs; FM/RM; Park; Rec
| ← I-69E | → US 69 |

Interstate 69W (I-69W (Note: Some sources use "IH-69W", as "IH" is an abbreviation used by TxDOT for Interstate Highways.)) is a relatively short north–south Interstate Highway running through South Texas in the United States. The freeway begins northeast of the middle of the World Trade International Bridge in Laredo and ends just east of I-35. In the future, I-69W will head northeast for 180 miles (290 km) before terminating near Victoria as both I-69E and I-69W merge to form I-69. For its entire length, I-69W runs concurrently with U.S. Highway 59 (US 59).

== Route description ==
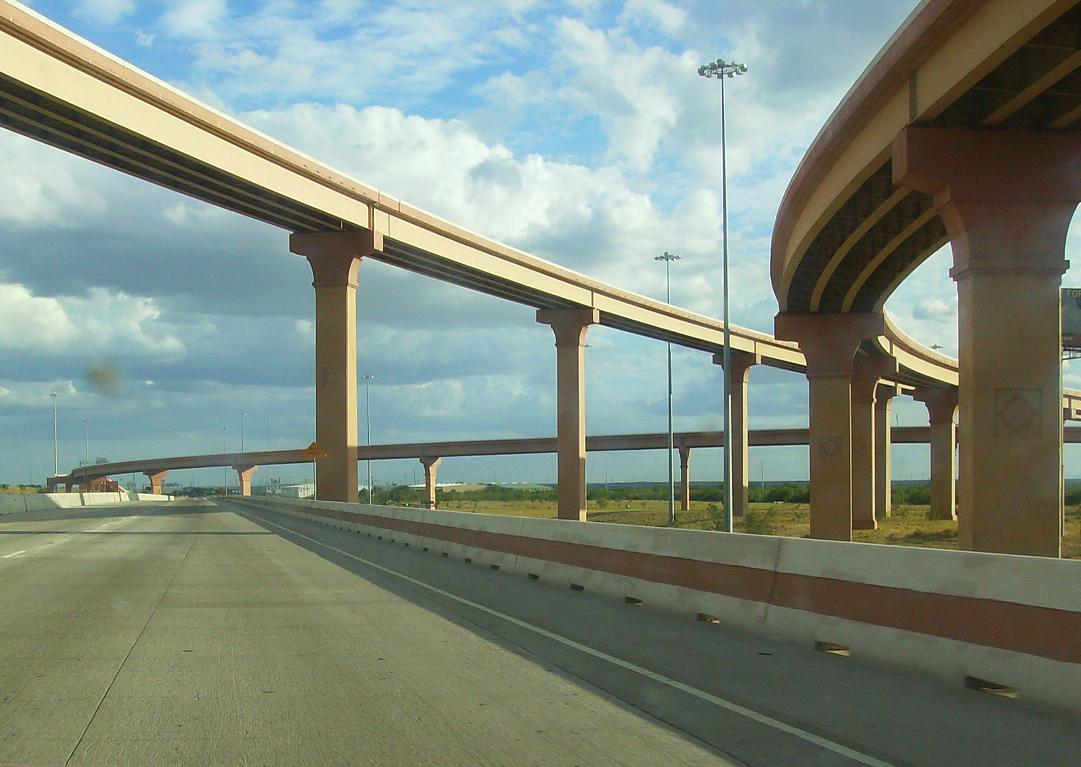
The stack interchange between I-35 (along with US 83) and I-69W, US 59 and Loop 20 in 2008

The Federal Highway Administration (FHWA) approved the designation of a 1.4-mile (2.3 km) section of freeway in Laredo as part of I-69W. The congressionally designated I-69W corridor begins at the Mexico–U.S. border on the World Trade International Bridge, which connects to Federal Highway 85D (Fed. 85D), at the border in Laredo. It is cosigned with both US 59 and Loop 20 (Bob Bullock Loop) and extends 1.4 miles (2.3 km) to I-35 (which connects to Fed. 85 south of the border).

When extended, I-69W will follow US 59 serving Freer, George West, and Beeville before terminating with I-69E and both interstates meeting I-69 in Victoria. In George West, I-69W will eventually intersect I-69C, then I-69W will intersect I-37 east of George West.

== History ==
The Intermodal Surface Transportation Efficiency Act of 1991 included two High Priority Corridors that would later become parts of a proposed cross-country extension of I-69:

- (18) Corridor from Indianapolis, Indiana, to Memphis, Tennessee, via Evansville, Indiana.
- (20) US 59 Corridor from Laredo, Texas, through Houston, Texas, to the vicinity of Texarkana, Texas.

The National Highway System Designation Act of 1995 made further amendments to the description of Corridor 18, specifying that it would serve Mississippi and Arkansas, extending it south to the Mexico–U.S. border in the Lower Rio Grande Valley, and adding a short connection at Brownsville. This act also specified that corridors 18 and 20 were "future parts of the Interstate System", to become actual Interstates when built to Interstate standards and connected to other Interstates.

The Transportation Equity Act for the 21st Century (TEA-21), enacted in 1998, greatly expanded the extension to the Lower Rio Grande Valley was detailed as splitting into two routes just south of Victoria, one following US 77 and the other following US 59 and US 281 to the Rio Grande. This act also assigned the I-69 designation to corridors 18 and 20, with the branches on US 77, US 281, and US 59 to the Rio Grande being "Interstate 69 East", "Interstate 69 Central", and "Interstate 69 West", respectively. With TEA-21, the I-69 extension took shape and remains today as those segments.

I-69W was designated in June 2014. Before January 2020, traffic at Loop 20/US 59 at the I-35 junction had to continue through the frontage roads before overpasses opened. The construction project to extend I-69W to where US 59 splits from Loop 20 was let in 2023.

== Future ==
In the future, I-69W will continue along US 59 east to George West, where it will intersect I-69C. It will then intersect I-37 east of George West and continue east to Victoria, where it will meet with I-69E and continue toward Houston as I-69. The completed I-69W will measure 180 miles (290 km). There are also plans to turn State Highway 44 (SH 44) into an Interstate Highway between Freer, where it will intersect I-69W, and Corpus Christi for about 73 miles (117 km) to have a network of Interstate Highways connecting Laredo, the largest inland port on the Mexico–U.S. border, with Corpus Christi, a major seaport and manufacturing center. Construction to extend I-69W to Laredo International Airport began in early 2024 and will be completed by early 2030. Projects to extend the Interstate to the Duval–McMullen county line are currently in the planning stage but not completely funded. Much of the existing US 59 will be upgraded. The US 59 bridge over the San Antonio River is planned to be replaced, it was funded by the Infrastructure Investment and Jobs Act. Upgrades at the I-37 junction and upgrades of US 59 from I-37 to Beeville are planned.

== Exit list ==
| County | Location | mi | km | Exit | Destinations | Notes |
|---|---|---|---|---|---|---|
| Webb | Laredo | 0.000 | 0.000 | — | International Bridge IV – Mexico | Laredo World Trade Port of Entry; western (southern) end of US 59 overlap / western (northern) end of Loop 20 overlap; road continues into Mexico as Camino al Puente Internacional Comercio Mundial |
| Webb | Laredo | 0.000 | 0.000 | 0 | Back to USA | Southbound exit only |
| Webb | Laredo | 0.245– 1.169 | 0.394– 1.881 | 1 | FM 1472 (Mines Road) | |
| Webb | Laredo | 1.368– 1.436 | 2.202– 2.311 | 2 | I-35 (US 83) – Laredo, San Antonio | Signed as exits 2A (north) and 2B (south) northbound; exit 8A on I-35 |
| Webb | Laredo | 1.368– 1.436 | 2.202– 2.311 | — | US 59 east (Loop 20 east) | Eastern end of US 59/Loop 20 overlap; US 59/Loop 20 continues east as Bob Bullock Loop; current eastern terminus of I-69W |
| Webb | Laredo | 3.7 | 6.0 | 3 | McPherson Road | Interchange; westbound exit via the International Boulevard exit; access to Doctors Hospital of Laredo |
| Webb | Laredo | 4.7 | 7.6 | 4 | International Boulevard | Interchange |
| Webb | Laredo | 6.2 | 10.0 | 6 | Shiloh Drive | Interchange under construction |
| Webb | Laredo | 7.3 | 11.7 | 7 | Del Mar Boulevard | Interchange under construction |
| Webb | Laredo | 8.1 | 13.0 | 8 | University Boulevard – Texas A&M International University | Interchange under construction |
| Webb | Laredo | 9.3 | 15.0 | 9 | Jacaman Road | Interchange under construction |
| Webb | Laredo | 10.5 | 16.9 | 10 | Laredo International Airport | Future interchange |
| Webb | Laredo | 11.5 | 18.5 | 11 | Loop 20 south (Bob Bullock Loop) / US 59 north (Lloyd Bentsen Highway) / Bus. US 59-Z west (Saunders Street) | Interchange; eastern end of Loop 20 overlap, I-69W will continue north along US 59 to Victoria, access to Laredo Medical Center |
| Victoria | Victoria | 176.6 | 284.2 | 176 | US 77 north / Bus. US 59-T north – Cuero, Hallettsville | Interchange; future north end of US 77 concurrency. |
| Victoria | Victoria | 177.2 | 285.2 | 177 | FM 446 | Future interchange |
| Victoria | Victoria | 180.0 | 289.7 | 180 | US 77 south / Bus. US 77 north (Refugio Highway) to I-69E south – Refugio, Victoria, Corpus Christi | Interchange; I-69E will go south along US 77 to Brownsville; future east end of US 77 concurrency. |
| Victoria | Victoria | 180.2 | 290.0 | – | I-69 north / US 59 north – Houston | Future eastern terminus. I-69W and I-69E merge with I-69 to continue to Houston. |
1.000 mi = 1.609 km; 1.000 km = 0.621 mi: Concurrency terminus; Incomplete access; Route transition; Unopened
