= Dolores, Texas =

- unincorporated community
- Interactive map of Dolores, Texas
- Coordinates: 27°41′19″N 99°43′57″W
- Established: 1860

Population (1990)
  - Total: 20
- Time zone: UTC-6 (CST)
  - Summer (DST): UTC-5 (CST)
- Area code: +1-956
- Nearest Airports: Laredo: Laredo International Airport KLRD LRD Nuevo Laredo: Quetzalcoatl International Airport MMNL NLD

Dolores is a community near the Rio Grande in western Webb County, Texas, United States, near Laredo.

== History ==
Dolores was established as a Mexican village called San José in 1860. In 1882, the Cannel Coal Company opened mines along the Rio Grande. Cannel Coal Company built the Rio Grande and Eagle Pass Railroad to ship coal from the town and renamed the San José village after its company president's daughter Dolores. In 1914, Dolores reportedly had a population of 1,000. The mines were closed in 1939. Its population declined to 20 in 1936. The population remained 20 according to the 1990 census.
