= Texas State Highway Loop 20 =

State highway loop around Laredo, Texas, United States

State Highway Loop 20
- Bob Bullock Loop; Cuatro Vientos Road

Route information
- Maintained by TxDOT
- Length: 14.869 mi (Note: The certified mileage given is shorter than the actual mileage as TxDOT considers Loop 20 to be discontinuous at rather than concurrent with I-69W/US 59.) (23.929 km)
- Existed: 1939–present

Major junctions
- CCW (North) end: I-69W / US 59 / Fed. 85D at the Mexican border on the World Trade International Bridge
- I-35 / US 83; Future I-69W / US 59
- CW (South) end: Mangana-Hein Road

Location
- Country: United States
- State: Texas

Highway system
- Highways in Texas; Interstate; US; State; Former; Toll; Loops; Spurs; FM/RM; Park; Rec
← SH 20	→ PR 20

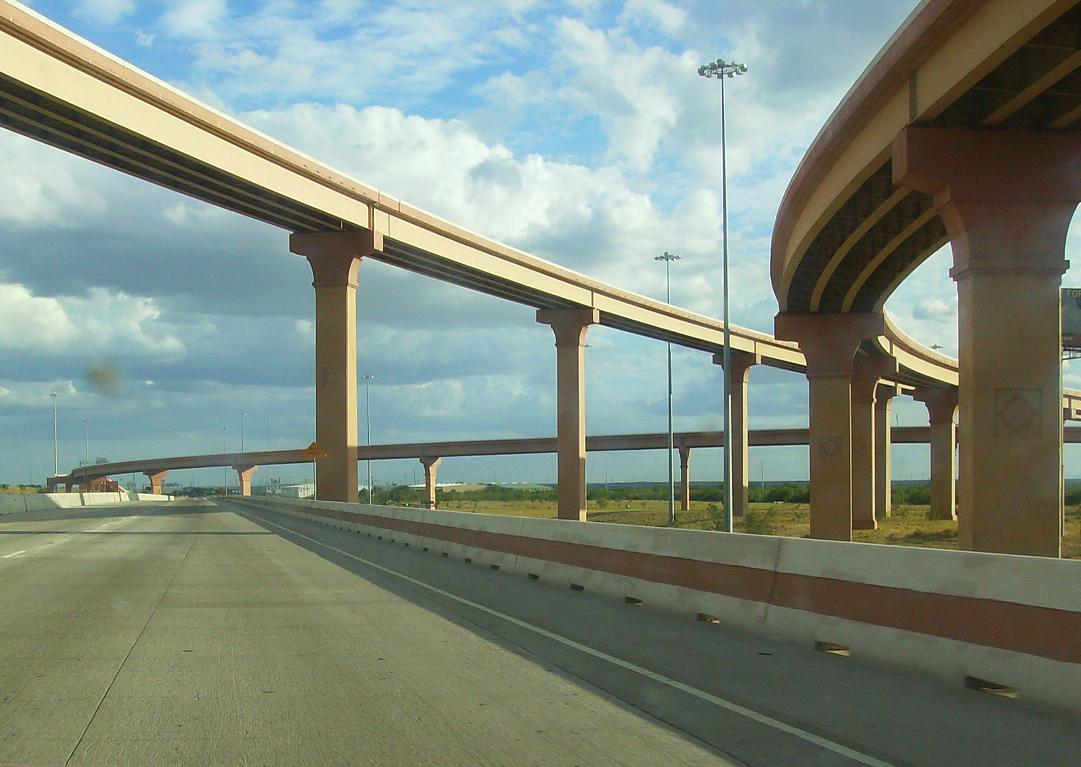
Interstate 35 - Loop 20 (and Interstate 69W - U.S. 59 - U.S. 83) stacked interchange under construction

Loop 20, also known as the Bob Bullock Loop and Cuatro Vientos Road, is a highway loop that runs to the north and east of the city of Laredo, Texas. Loop 20 extends from the World Trade International Bridge at its northern point to Mangana-Hein Road at its southern point. The current route varies in construction from a two-lane road (at its southernmost end) to a freeway with frontage roads (near the World Trade Bridge).

In recent years, much of Laredo's growth has been along Loop 20, with the construction of a new passenger terminal at Laredo International Airport, the Sames Auto Arena, the Uni-Trade Stadium, the new campus of Texas A&M International University, and Doctors Hospital being the most prominent projects.

== History ==
Loop 20 was designated on September 26, 1939 from US Highway 96 (US 96, later US 59, and now SH 359) to US 83 in Laredo as a renumbering of SH 12 Loop. On September 27, 1985, Loop 20 was extended from SH 359 to US 59. On August 29, 1996, it was extended north to FM 3464 two miles (3.2 km) east of I-35. On May 28, 1998, Loop 20 was extended west and southwest to the Mexico border, concurrently with part of FM 3464. On May 29, 2008, Loop 20 was to be rerouted south of SH 359 to US 83, with the old route (the original portion) to become Spur 260. The section from SH 359 to Mangana-Hein Road (seven miles [11 km]) opened in 2011, and as a result, the old route was officially signed as Spur 260. On August 29, 2013, a shortcut opened south of SH 359, with the old route becoming Spur 259. On February 27, 2014 the section from the entrance to the World Trade Bridge (0.6 miles west of FM 1472) to the intersection with US 59 was redesignated as US 59, but on July 31, 2014 the Loop 20 designation was restored on this section as a concurrency with US 59.

== Future expansion ==
The Texas Department of Transportation's Laredo District is preparing for future growth with plans to upgrade Loop 20 into a freeway by building overpasses at major intersections and constructing frontage roads. A short freeway section, which is co-signed with both Interstate 69W (I-69W) and US 59, currently exists from the World Trade International Bridge east to I-35 and TxDOT recently constructed a diamond interchange at Loop 20's intersection with US 59 in eastern Laredo; the stack interchange with I-35, locally known as the Milo Interchange, is partially complete. As of 2008, TxDOT planned to complete interchanges and overpasses at all of Loop 20's major intersections within the next ten years.

As of 2011, TxDOT is currently constructing an interchange at SH 359. An additional interchange at Clark Boulevard, Spur 400, has been announced by the City of Laredo.

The Cuatro Vientos Road portion of the route is designed for future expansion to a freeway throughout, as well as an extension to the south to US 83 in the vicinity of Rio Bravo, possibly connecting to a future international bridge.

Loop 20 may be part of I-2 extension. It would terminate at US 59.

== Previous routes ==
The northwest section of Loop 20 west of I-35 to FM 1472 was originally part of FM 3464, a 1.15-mile (1.85 km) road designated on October 26, 1983, to connect I-35 to FM 1472 in northern Laredo. On April 1, 1988, the route was extended east 2.0 miles (3.2 km) over FM 3488, which was cancelled. On June 27, 1995, FM 3464 became Urban Road 3464. On June 29, 2000, FM 3464 was cancelled, as the section west of I-35 was removed from the state highway system, and the section east of I-35 was already part of Loop 20.

== Junction list ==
The entire route is in Laredo, Webb County.

mi	km	Destinations	Notes
0.0	0.0	World Trade International Bridge; southern terminus of I-69W/US 59	
0.1	0.16	U.S. Customs	
1.1	1.8	FM 1472 (Mines Road)	
2.3	3.7	I-35 (US 83) – Laredo, San Antonio I-69W ends	Current east end of I-69W overlap; 5 of 8 direct connectors open to traffic
3.7	6.0	McPherson Road	Westbound exit via the International Boulevard exit; access to Doctors Hospital of Laredo
4.7	7.6	International Boulevard	Interchange; current east end of freeway
6.2	10.0	Shiloh Drive	Interchange under construction
7.3	11.7	Del Mar Boulevard	Interchange under construction
8.1	13.0	University Boulevard – Texas A&M International University	Interchange under construction
9.3	15.0	Jacaman Road	Interchange under construction
10.5	16.9	Laredo International Airport	Future interchange
11.5	18.5	Future I-69W north / US 59 north (Lloyd Bentsen Highway) / Saunders Street west	Interchange; east end of US 59 overlap; future east end of I-69W overlap; north end of freeway; access to Laredo Medical Center
12.5	20.1	Spur 400 (Clark Boulevard)	
13.1	21.1	SH 359 / Spur 260 – Hebbronville	Interchange; south end of freeway
15.1	24.3	Jalapa Street	Southbound access only
16.5	26.6	Lomas Del Sur Boulevard	Interchange under construction
17.2	27.7	La Pita Mangana Road	Southbound access only
17.7	28.5	Sierra Vista Boulevard	Future interchange
18.5	29.8	Cielito Lindo Boulevard	Future interchange
21.0	33.8	Mangana-Hein Road to US 83	Current southern terminus; access to US 83 via westbound Mangana-Hein Road
1.000 mi = 1.609 km; 1.000 km = 0.621 mi: Concurrency terminus; Incomplete access

== See also ==
- List of state highway loops in Texas
