= Juárez–Lincoln International Bridge =

International bridge on the US–Mexico border

Juarez-Lincoln International Bridge
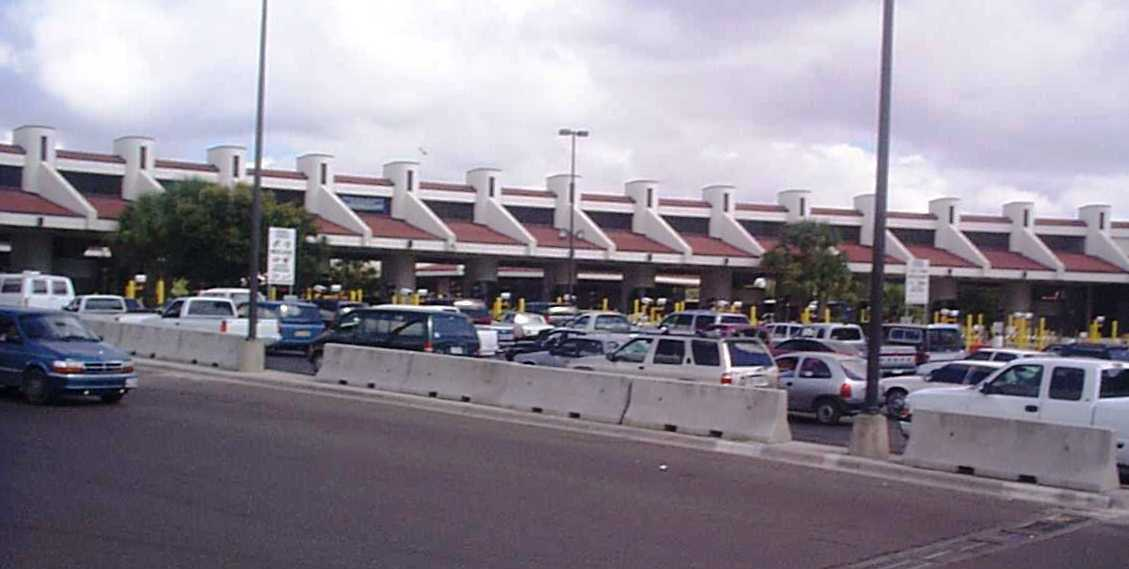
- Laredo Port of Entry
- Coordinates: 27.500216°N 99.502814°W
- Carries: Buses; Non-commercial Vehicles
- Crosses: Rio Grande
- Locale: Laredo, Texas – Nuevo Laredo, Tamaulipas
- Official name: Juarez-Lincoln International Bridge
- Other name: Laredo International Bridge 2
- Maintained by: City of Laredo; CAPUFE
- Website: www.cbp.gov/contact/ports/laredo-texas-2304

Characteristics
- Design: Box Girder Bridge
- Total length: 1008 ft (481 m)
- Width: 72 ft (22 m)

History
- Opened: 1976

Statistics
- Daily traffic: Non-commercial: 13,133; Commercial: 103
- Toll: Non-Commercial Vehicles $1.75/axle (southbound); 30 pesos (northbound) Buses $4.75/axle (southbound); 65 pesos (northbound)

Location
- Interactive map of Juarez-Lincoln International Bridge

The Juárez–Lincoln International Bridge (also known as Laredo International Bridge 2) is one of four vehicular international bridges located in the cities of Laredo, Texas, and Nuevo Laredo, Tamaulipas, that connect the United States and Mexico over the Rio Grande (Río Bravo). It is owned and operated by City of Laredo and the Secretaria de Comunicaciones y Transportes (Mexico's federal Secretariat of Communication and Transportation).

== History ==
The Juarez-Lincoln International Bridge was named in honor of the Mexican President Benito Juárez and U.S. President Abraham Lincoln. It was built in 1976 to alleviate traffic on the Gateway to the Americas International Bridge and to accommodate the fast-growing cities of Laredo and Nuevo Laredo.

== Description ==
The Juárez–Lincoln International Bridge is an eight-lane bridge with and is 1,008 feet (307 m) long and 72 feet (22 m) wide. The international bridge is for buses and non-commercial traffic only. The bridge is also known as Bridge Number Two, Laredo-Nuevo Laredo Bridge 2, New Bridge, Puente Juárez-Lincoln, Laredo II and Puente Nuevo. It had a dedicated lane for SENTRI program users until 2018. SENTRI users now have to cross through the Gateway to the Americas International Bridge. The change was made to accommodate SENTRI users from long lines and long waiting.

== Location ==
This bridge is located in the southern terminus of Interstate 35 east of downtown Laredo, Texas and on the northern terminus of Luis Donaldo Colosio Loop in Nuevo Laredo, Tamaulipas. It operates 24 hours a day.

== Border crossing ==
U.S. border station at Juarez-Lincoln Bridge

The Laredo Juarez-Lincoln Port of Entry is the international port of entry inspection station at the Juarez-Lincoln International Bridge.

The station was built in 1976, primarily to divert truck traffic from the congested Gateway to the Americas International Bridge. However, it too was soon overwhelmed with traffic. Currently, all trucks are inspected at the other bridge crossings, leaving only passenger vehicles and buses crossing at this location.
