= Laredo–Colombia Solidarity International Bridge =

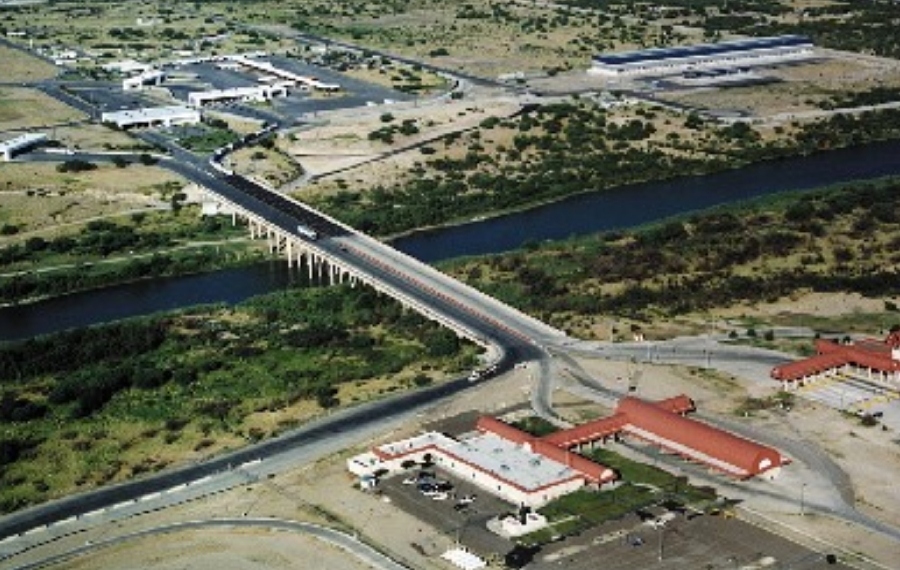
- Laredo International Bridge 3
- Coordinates: 27°41′59″N 99°44′44″W
- Carries: Commercial Vehicles; Non-commercial Vehicles
- Crosses: Rio Grande
- Locale: Laredo, Texas, U.S.A. and Colombia, Nuevo Leon, Mexico
- Official name: Laredo–Colombia Solidarity International Bridge
- Other name: Laredo International Bridge 3
- Maintained by: City of Laredo; Secretariat of Communications and Transportation
- Website: www.cbp.gov/contact/ports/laredo-texas-2304

Characteristics
- Design: Box Girder Bridge
- Total length: 1216 ft (371 m)

History
- Opened: April 23, 1992

Statistics
- Daily traffic: Non-commercial: 294; Commercial: 924
- Toll: Non-Commercial Vehicles $1.75/axle (southbound); 30 pesos (northbound) Commercial Vehicles $4.75/axle (southbound); 60 pesos (northbound)

Location
- Interactive map of Laredo–Colombia Solidarity International Bridge

The Laredo–Colombia Solidarity International Bridge is one of four vehicular international bridges located on the U.S.–Mexico border in the city of Laredo, Texas; it connects Laredo over the Rio Grande (Rio Bravo) with Colombia, Nuevo León. It is owned and operated by the City of Laredo and the Secretaría de Comunicaciones y Transportes (Mexico's Federal Ministry of Communications and Transportation).

== History ==
The Laredo–Colombia Solidarity International Bridge was named in honor of the Mexican planned community of Colombia, Nuevo León. The community and the international bridge were built because the Mexican state of Nuevo León, which has a very small border with the United States, wanted an international port to compete with the bordering states of Coahuila and Tamaulipas in the international trade market. Access to the Rio Grande and an international crossing secure that port. Indeed, the Laredo–Colombia Solidarity International Bridge is the only border crossing between Nuevo León and Texas.

== Description ==
The Laredo–Colombia Solidarity International Bridge is an eight-lane bridge with two walkways for pedestrians. The bridge is 1,216 feet (371 m) long. The international bridge is for all traffic, including pedestrians. The bridge is also known as Laredo International Bridge 3, Colombia Bridge, Puente Solidaridad, Puente Colombia and Puente Internacional Solidaridad Colombia.

On the United States side, the bridge connects to Texas State Highway 255, a road that bypasses downtown Laredo and connects to Interstate 35. On the Mexico side, the bridge connects to Nuevo Leon State Highway 1 Spur which in turn connects it to Highway 1 proper.

== Location ==
This bridge is located at the western terminus of State Highway 255, near its intersection with FM 1472, in Laredo, Texas and the northern terminus of Nuevo León State Highway Spur 1 in Colombia, Anáhuac Municipality.

== Border crossing ==
The Laredo Columbia Solidarity Port of Entry was built on January 6, 1991, in an effort to relieve traffic from the congested downtown Laredo bridges.

== Operational hours ==
Commercial Vehicles

- Sunday: 10:00 AM–2:00 PM
- Weekdays: 8:00 AM–10:30 PM
- Saturday: 9:00 AM–4:00 PM

Non-commercial Vehicles

- All Days: 8:00 AM–12:00 AM

All times Central Time Zone

== See also ==
- List of international bridges in North America
