= WCCN =

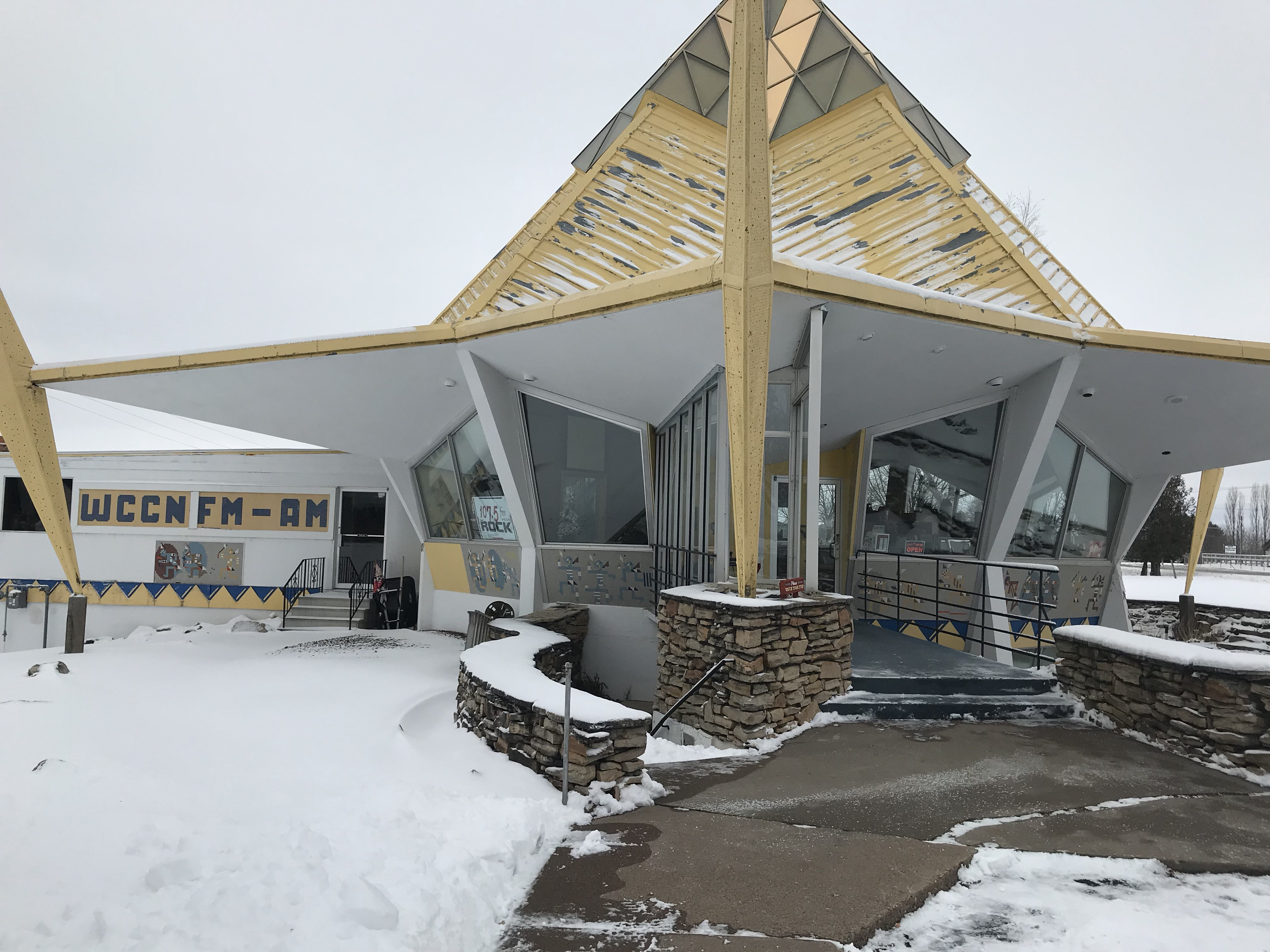
- The Central Wisconsin Broadcasting radio facility in the Wisconsin Pavilion in Neillsville
- Neillsville, Wisconsin; United States
- Frequency: 1370 kHz
- Branding: Memories 1370 AM/98.5 FM

Programming
- Format: Soft adult contemporary
- Affiliations: Premiere Networks

Ownership
- Owner: Central Wisconsin Broadcasting, Inc.
- Sister stations: WCCN-FM, WDLB, WOSQ, WPKG

History
- First air date: September 23, 1957
- Call sign meaning: Wisconsin, Clark County, Neillsville

Technical information
- Licensing authority: FCC
- Facility ID: 10027
- Class: D
- Power: 5,000 watts day; 42 watts night
- Transmitter coordinates: 44°34′18.7″N 90°35′8.5″W
- Translator: 98.5 W253CN (Neillsville)

Links
- Public license information: Public file; LMS
- Website: cwbradio.com/stations/memories-1370-985/

WCCN-FM
- Neillsville, Wisconsin; United States
- Frequency: 107.5 MHz
- Branding: 107.5 The Rock

Programming
- Format: Active rock
- Affiliations: Packers Radio Network

Ownership
- Owner: Central Wisconsin Broadcasting, Inc.

History
- First air date: July 11, 1964
- Former call signs: WZZN (4/1/1991-4/2/1991)

Technical information
- Licensing authority: FCC
- Facility ID: 10029
- Class: C1
- ERP: 100,000 watts
- HAAT: 176 meters
- Transmitter coordinates: 44°35′30.4″N 90°37′9.9″W

Links
- Public license information: Public file; LMS
- Webcast: Listen live
- Website: cwbradio.com/stations/1075-the-rock/

WCCN (1370 AM) and WCCN-FM (107.5 FM) are radio stations in Neillsville, Wisconsin, United States. The stations are owned by Central Wisconsin Broadcasting, Inc., and broadcast soft adult contemporary and active rock formats, respectively, from studios in the Wisconsin Pavilion and transmitter sites north of the city. WCCN AM's signal is additionally relayed full-time over low-power translator W253CN (98.5 FM), also licensed to Neillsville.

WCCN went on the air in 1957 as the first local radio station for Clark County, followed by the FM counterpart in 1964. Central Wisconsin Broadcasting purchased the Wisconsin Pavilion from the 1964 New York World's Fair, which had already been disassembled and moved to Wisconsin, and reassembled it as the studios for the WCCN stations in 1967. The Grap family, the current owners, bought the stations in 1976. The stations operated as one program service airing country music until 1992, when the FM flipped to a rock format and the AM to adult standards.

== History ==
=== Early years ===
On December 15, 1956, Central Wisconsin Broadcasting, Inc., filed with the Federal Communications Commission (FCC) to establish a new radio station in Neillsville. Initially proposing a 1,000-watt daytime-only operation on 1260 kHz, the application was amended to 1370 kHz in April 1957, and the FCC granted the construction permit on June 27. WCCN debuted September 23, 1957, as the first local radio station for Clark County; 2,000 people toured the station at a dedication ceremony days later. Seeking to increase the population served by more than 42,000, WCCN filed to increase power to 5,000 watts in July 1958; the FCC approved the application a year later, and the increase was carried out on July 20, 1959.

Four years later, Central Wisconsin Broadcasting applied for an FM station on 105.5 MHz. WCCN-FM received a construction permit on March 20, 1964, and began broadcasting on July 11. It allowed WCCN to extend broadcasting into the evening hours, beyond the AM station's sunset sign-off. A year later, the station was approved to move to 107.5 MHz, where its effective radiated power was raised from 3 to 100 kW. The stations, having tried several formats, settled on a simulcast full-service country music format incorporating local news and community programming.

=== Wisconsin Pavilion ===
In November 1965, Central Wisconsin Broadcasting acquired the dismantled Wisconsin Pavilion, previously erected at the 1964 New York World's Fair, for $41,000. It had been acquired by a Boscobel man, Ivan Wilcox; with no local interest in funding its reconstruction, Wilcox put it up for sale again with the stipulation that it remain in the state. Central Wisconsin Broadcasting planned to locate the WCCN stations inside the pavilion and add a basement as part of reassembly. Architect John Steinmann provided assistance in the reassembly of the structure. When the building was rededicated in July 1967, it housed the radio station, other companies, and a gift shop.

Over the years, other roadside attractions were added. In 1966, a 16-foot (4.9 m)-tall replica of a Holstein cow, named "Chatty Belle", was erected by Central Wisconsin Broadcasting for the Clark County Fair and then moved near the pavilion. Also added was the semi-truck that carried a world-record wheel of cheese to the World's Fair, as well as a replica of the cheese itself.

=== Grap family ownership ===
Howard Sturtz Jr. sold his remaining interest in the WCCN stations and Central Wisconsin Broadcasting to J. Wayne Grap in 1976; the sale allowed Stultz to focus on his orchestra. Wayne's son, Keith Grap, bought the company—as well as the Pavilion and the gift shop inside—from his father a decade later. (Note: They owned 49 percent by 1991, when they acquired the remainder from Wayne Grap.) During this time, WCCN struggled as country music stations in larger city markets took away listenership. With a high debt load from overpaying for the business, Grap split the stations into separate program services in 1992. WCCN AM became an adult standards–formatted station known as Memories and continued to broadcast all of the local service programming, while WCCN-FM became The Rock with a classic rock format.

AM former logo

Central Wisconsin Broadcasting has since expanded its cluster beyond the WCCN stations. In 2004, WPKG (92.7 FM) debuted with an adult contemporary format. Into the 2010s, WCCN kept its standards format with weekend polka music. The firm acquired two more radio stations—WOSQ, licensed to Spencer, and Marshfield-licensed WDLB—from Seehafer Broadcasting in 2021. By this time, WCCN AM was airing a soft adult contemporary format.
