= Wisconsin Pavilion =

Structure in Neillsville, Wisconsin

- U.S. National Register of Historic Places
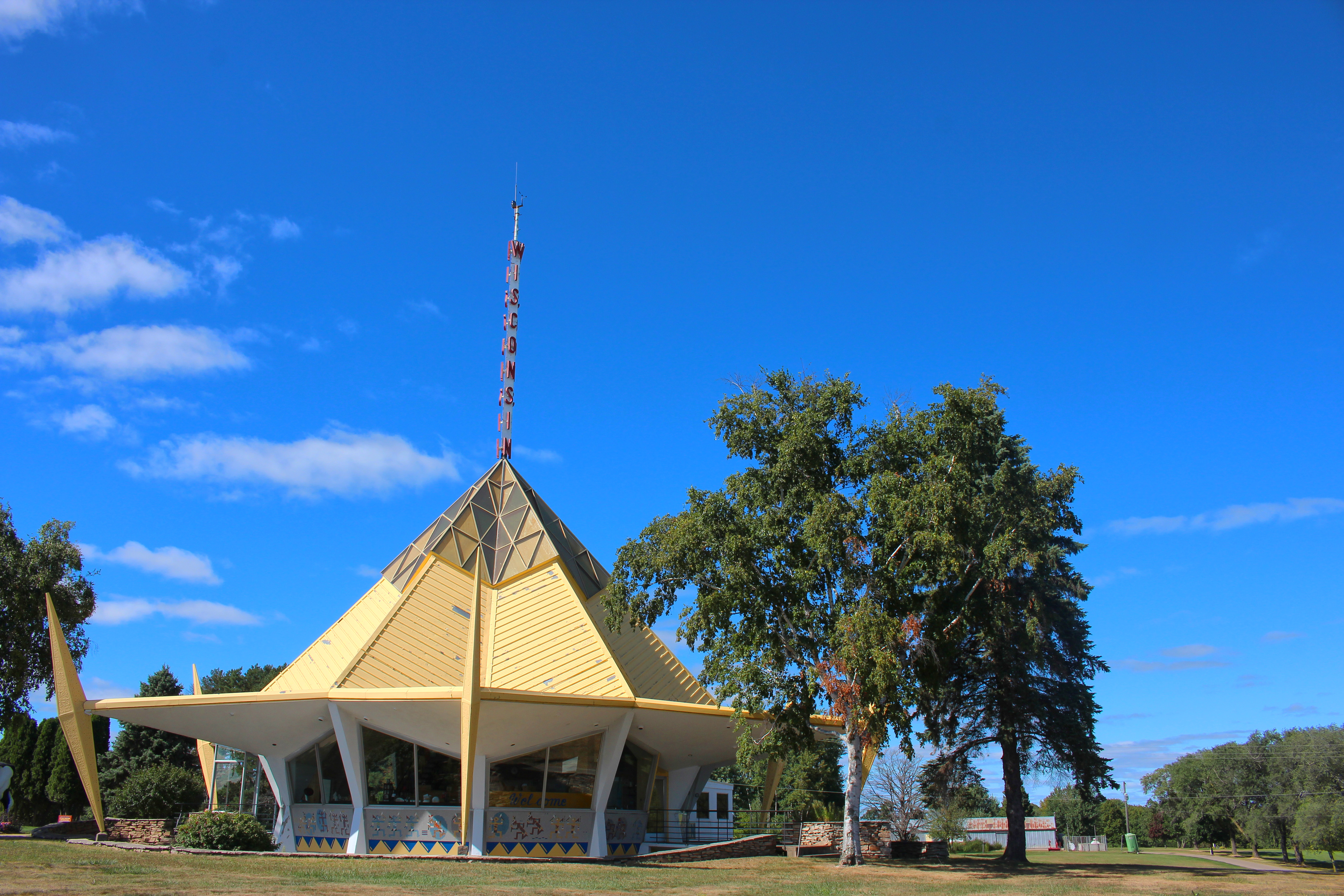
- The Wisconsin Pavilion as seen from East Division Street

- Location within Wisconsin Location within the United States
- Interactive map showing the location of the Wisconsin Pavilion
- Location: 1201 East Division Street; Neillsville, Wisconsin, U.S.
- Coordinates: 44°33′11″N 90°34′48″W
- Built: 1964
- Architect: John Steinmann
- Architectural style: Mid-Century Modern
- NRHP reference No.: 12000021
- Added to NRHP: February 14, 2012

The Wisconsin Pavilion is a modernist-style building at 1201 East Division Street in Neillsville, Wisconsin, United States. Designed by John Steinmann, it was erected for the 1964 New York World's Fair at Flushing Meadows–Corona Park in Queens, New York, serving as the rotunda for the fair's Wisconsin exhibit. It was moved to Wisconsin in 1965, and has since functioned as a tourist center and as a broadcast studio for radio stations WCCN AM and FM since 1967. It is listed on the National Register of Historic Places.

The New York World's Fair Corporation invited the Wisconsin government to host an exhibit at the fair in 1961. Due to political disputes, the Wisconsin World's Fair Commission (WFC), which was tasked with organizing the state's world's fair exhibit, was not established until July 1963. After the WFC was unable to secure funding for the pavilion, two Wisconsin businessmen, Charles Sanders and Clark Prudhon, developed the structure with private funds. The pavilion opened behind schedule in 1964 and operated as a World's Fair exhibit for two years. Ivan Wilcox, a blacksmith from Boscobel, Wisconsin, bought the rotunda and shipped it back to Wisconsin. Howard Sturtz bought the building in 1966 and reassembled it in Neillsville; it was rededicated on July 13, 1967. The structure has been owned since the 1970s by the Grap family, who continue to operate the pavilion and radio stations in the 21st century.

The pavilion is a twelve-sided structure with six canopies, with a metal roof supported by slanted concrete piers. It is topped with a glass spire with letters spelling out the state's name. The interior contains offices, broadcast studios, and a gift shop and tourist center. It is surrounded by a landscaped lawn with a sunken rock garden. Located next to it is a fiberglass model of a talking cow named Chatty Belle, which measures 16 feet (4.9 m) tall and 20 feet (6.1 m) long.

== Development ==
Flushing Meadows–Corona Park in Queens, New York, United States, hosted the 1964 New York World's Fair. New York City parks commissioner Robert Moses was president of the New York World's Fair Corporation, which leased the park from the government of New York City. Meanwhile, the state of Wisconsin had participated in multiple world's fairs in the U.S., beginning with the Centennial Exposition in Philadelphia in 1876. However, the Wisconsin government had not participated in the 1939 New York World's Fair, and it would not host a major world's fair exhibit until the 1964 fair.

=== Initial plans and funding issues ===
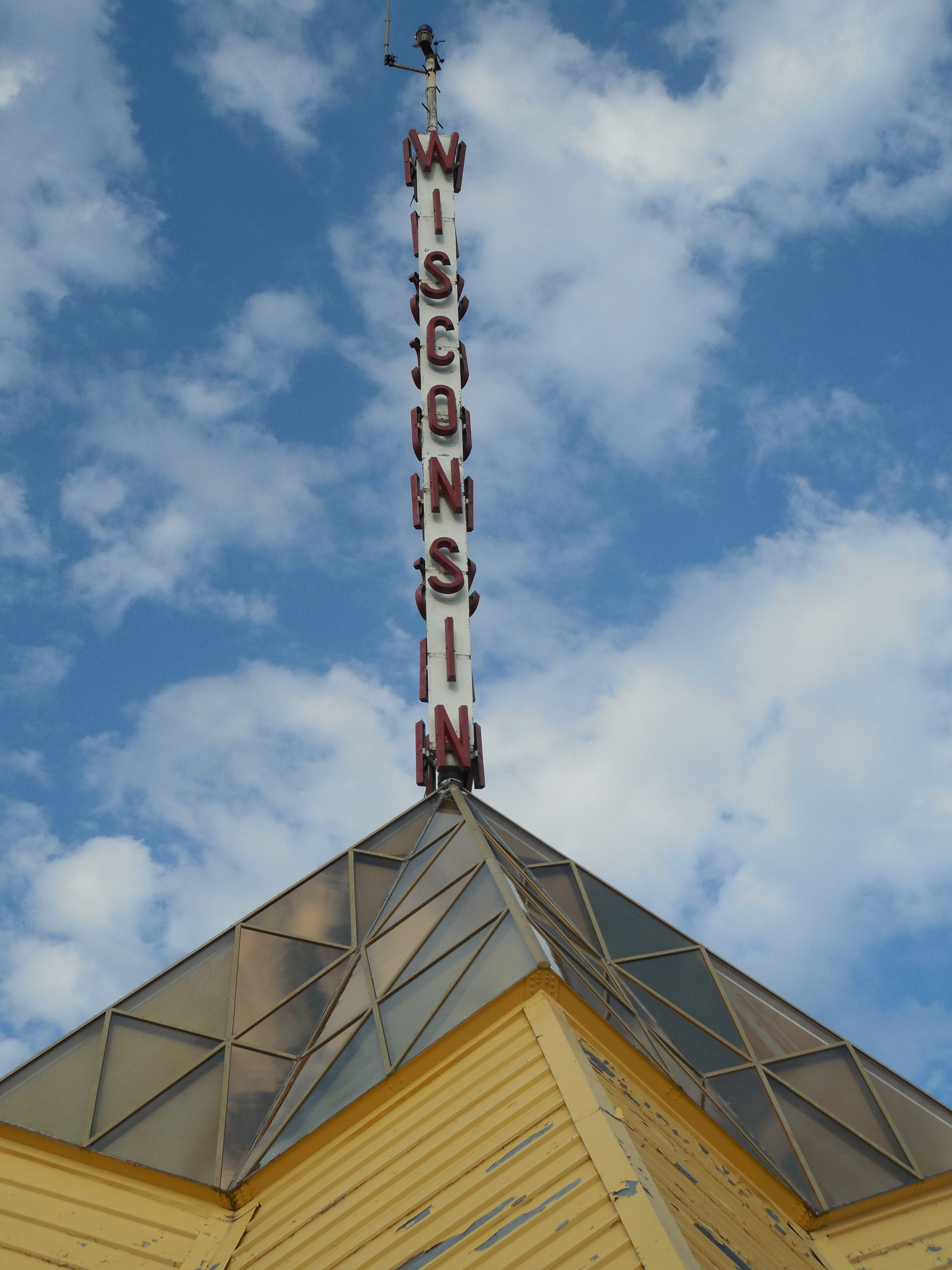
The pinnacle

The Wisconsin government was invited to join the 1964 World's Fair in 1961, and the Wisconsin Department of Resource Development's director David Carley brought up the idea of a Wisconsin exhibit at a meeting with officials from the New York World's Fair Corporation that October. By late 1961, officials from Michigan and Wisconsin proposed a joint exhibit at the fair, which would have been themed to the Great Lakes states. In November 1962, the New York World's Fair Corporation sent a telegram inviting John W. Reynolds Jr., the newly elected governor of Wisconsin, to participate in the 1964 New York World's Fair. Reynolds did not respond to the telegram, but Jack B. Olson, the state's lieutenant governor, did.

The Wisconsin Legislature's upper house, the Wisconsin Senate, voted in April 1963 to create the World's Fair Participation Committee, a 16-person commission led by Olson, to oversee the development of an exhibit. The commission included representatives of several of Wisconsin's industries, and Reynolds was added as an honorary member. That May, the Wisconsin State Assembly (the state legislature's lower house) approved the participation-committee bill, but Reynolds vetoed the bill because Olson, who was from a rival political party, led the committee. The Senate overrode Reynolds's veto, but the Assembly did not. Both houses approved a compromise solution in June 1963. As part of the compromise, Olson would lead the committee, but Reynolds would serve as an honorary chairman. Reynolds approved the compromise the next month, and the Wisconsin World's Fair Commission (WFC) was formally established on July 11, 1963. The committee had until September 3 to decide whether to build the pavilion, and a 38,000-square-foot (3,500 m^{2}) site next to the United States Pavilion was set aside for the Wisconsin exhibit.

Both houses of the state legislature voted in May 1963 to allocate $35,000 (equivalent to $368,000 in 2025) for a 12-short-ton (11-long-ton; 11 t) block of cheese, and Reynolds approved the funding that June. Some of the cheese funding was taken from the state's department of conservation. The Wisconsin Cheese Foundation agreed to pay for the cheese and hired Steve Suidzinski of Denmark, Wisconsin, to manufacture the cheese. The piece of cheese was to be displayed on the pavilion's third floor, but the WFC discovered that the cheese was too heavy for the pavilion. That August, the Wisconsin WFC formed a nonprofit organization to sell space in the pavilion to Wisconsin businesses. The WFC approved a design by the architect Herbert Fritz. The initial design called for an 18,000-square-foot (1,700 m^{2}) domed structure with indoor and outdoor exhibition space and a cafe. At the end of the month, Olson reached out to several businesspeople to provide $1.2 million (equivalent to $12,600,000 in 2025) for the pavilion; the Department of Resource Development had not even contacted anyone for funding. Frank Zeidler, who led the Wisconsin Department of Resource Development, did not want the state government to sponsor the fair, saying the funds should be reallocated to the Wisconsin State Fair.

=== Prudhon and Sanders plans ===
The WFC downscaled its plans in September 1963 after failing to raise $1 million. By then, several companies from Wisconsin had leased space in the fair's other pavilions; According to Olson, these companies had decided not to move into a potential Wisconsin exhibit because of Reynolds's indecision. The WFC had considered canceling the pavilion outright, but an official from the Wisconsin Agriculture Department said the legislature had already allocated $35,000 for cheese. Despite the uncertainty, Olson signed an agreement that month, securing Wisconsin's participation in the fair. Fritz initially suggested that a tarp be erected above the block of cheese. Clark Prudhon, the president of Pruden Steel in Evansville, Wisconsin, agreed to develop the state's pavilion. Prudhon's plan called for a building of no more than 15,000 square feet (1,400 m^{2}), and Prudhon offered to pay for the structural frame, which would cost around $15,000. Prudhon hired John Steinmann, who had designed Pruden's offices, to design a Wisconsin pavilion.

Amid the uncertainty, the WFC received at least a hundred offers for the pavilion's block of cheese, but Olson believed the cheese was a necessary part of the exhibit. Furthermore, although all structures at the World's Fair site were supposed to have been under construction by April 1963, the Wisconsin World's Fair Commission did not approve Steinmann's proposal until after this deadline. Despite the missed deadline, WFC officials convinced the New York World's Fair Corporation to approve the plans, saying that, since it used prefabricated materials, the Wisconsin Pavilion could be built much more quickly than other structures. The WFC continued to seek funding, having estimated that the pavilion needed another $300,000. Olson met with American Motors Corporation and Pabst Brewing Company officials in mid-September 1963 to ask for funds.

Charles Sanders, a manufacturing distributor from Lake Geneva, Wisconsin, received the WFC's permission that October to reach out to potential investors. Sanders claimed he could build a 20,000-square-foot (1,900 m^{2}) building for $200,000. If the WFC approved Sanders's plan, Prudhon would donate the amount of steel that he would have originally used, while Sanders would pay for the rest of the pavilion's cost. That November, the WFC reorganized itself as the World's Fair Authority. The agency tentatively agreed to allow Sanders's group, Wisconsin Pavilions Inc., to develop the pavilion. Pruden Steel agreed to donate the structural forms for the pavilion, and the developers retained Steinman as the architect. Wisconsin Pavilions Inc. agreed to provide space for state agencies. Wisconsin Pavilions Inc. filed articles of incorporation on November 29, 1963, and Reynolds and Olson agreed the next month to transfer control of the project to Wisconsin Pavilions Inc. and allow construction to begin. The project was to financed entirely with private funding. In addition, companies from across Wisconsin sold construction materials and mechanical systems to Wisconsin Pavilions Inc. at a discount.

=== Construction ===
The Wisconsin exhibit's cheese, nicknamed the Golden Giant, was produced at Suidzinski's company in January 1964. After the cheese was completed, it was covered with paraffin wax. The Golden Giant was displayed in a "cheesemobile", consisting of a truck donated by the Ford Motor Company and a glass-walled trailer donated by the Highway Trailer Company. Thermo King supplied a refrigerator to keep the cheese cool. A state legislator introduced a bill to provide a property tax exemption for the cheese. Two semi-trailer trucks transported the construction materials from Wisconsin to New York. To promote the pavilion, a banner was displayed on the trucks outside the Wisconsin State Capitol in Madison.

The site of the pavilion in New York was characterized in February 1964 as still being a "bare piece of ground". Olson indicated that the pavilion's rotunda would be moved to the Wisconsin State Fair after the World's Fair ended. Hartwig Displays completed a scale model of the pavilion that month, and Steinmann Associates created another scale model of the rotunda, which was displayed at two banks in Madison. Steel framing was being constructed by that March. The same month, Oscar Mayer became the first company from Wisconsin to agree to host an exhibit at the pavilion. The Golden Giant was supposed to have been transported to New York around April 8, but there were delays in constructing a concrete podium for the cheese. The Golden Giant had arrived in New York by April 21, shortly before the fair's opening. The building was ultimately finished 96 days after the materials arrived in New York. The original cost of the pavilion has been cited at around $100,000 (equivalent to $1,038,000 in 2025). (Note: Various sources give estimates of either $96,000, $98,000, $100,000, or $125,000.) The Boston Globe reported that the Wisconsin Pavilion's final cost was three times the original estimate.

== World's Fair use ==
=== Location and exhibits ===
==== Site and layout ====
1964 New York World's Fair grounds
Location of the Wisconsin Pavilion and selected other structures in the Federal and State Area during the 1964 World's Fair
Coordinate location: 40°44′40″N 73°50′46″W
1 Wisconsin Pavilion
2 New York State Pavilion
3 New York City Pavilion
4 Unisphere
5 United States Pavilion

The Wisconsin Pavilion was located in the fairground's federal and state area. The site was bounded by the Grand Central Parkway to the west, the New York City Pavilion to the north, the New Jersey Pavilion to the northeast, the New York State Pavilion to the southeast, and the Alaska and Missouri pavilions to the south. The site was close to the Unisphere, the fair's symbol and the center of the fairground, and it was near a footbridge leading to the fair's transportation zone and General Motors Pavilion.

The pavilion consisted of a central star-shaped rotunda surrounded by a "U"-shaped hall, both of which were made with materials supplied by Pruden Steel. The two structures totaled 19,000 square feet (1,800 m^{2}) or 20,000 square feet (1,900 m^{2}). The "U"-shaped structure included a bar with 250 seats and a steakhouse with 400 seats. All the exhibits were to the right or north of the rotunda, while the steakhouse was to the left or south. There was another 5,000 square feet (460 m^{2}) of terraces around the pavilion, along with plants from Wisconsin. During the 1964 season, there was a fishing pond measuring 24 by 60 feet (7.3 by 18.3 m), covered by translucent sheets of plastic. For the 1965 season, a beer garden replaced the pond, and sandwich and chicken-frying concessions were operated at the pavilion.

==== Exhibits ====
The Wisconsin Pavilion contained displays of products from Wisconsin and exhibits about the state's features. Several firms from Wisconsin provided funds for the pavilion and hosted exhibits there. Miller Brewing Company was one of the major sponsors. Oscar Mayer's exhibit at the pavilion had a theater with a short film, and the company was given an exclusive contract to sell meat products at the pavilion. Morris Lillethun created a stained glass artwork called Faith as the exhibit of the city of La Crosse, Wisconsin. The state's conservation, agriculture, and resource development departments had an exhibit in the rotunda. The exhibit was a replica of a wooded bluff in Wisconsin, designed by landscape architects Homer Fieldhouse and Alex Jordan Jr. There were displays about sports such as archery and fly casting.

The Golden Giant cheese weighed 34,591 pounds (15,690 kg) and measured 6 by 6.5 by 14.5 feet (1.8 by 2.0 by 4.4 m) across. Marketed as the world's largest piece of cheese, it used 92 pounds (42 kg) of rennet, 1/3 short ton (0.30 long tons; 0.30 t) of salt, and 367,000 U.S. gallons (1,390,000 L) of milk. The Golden Giant was displayed in a glass-walled trailer near the New York City Pavilion and Grand Central Parkway. The trailer, manufactured by the Milwaukee-based Louis Hoffman Company, was 35 feet (11 m) long and included 8,000 pounds (3,600 kg) of glass. The Golden Giant was surrounded by a wood-planked container, and 9-inch-wide (23 cm) fir cylinders were placed within the cheese to allow it to ripen. The paraffin wax covering prevented mold from growing and kept the Golden Giant from drying out. A documentary on the cheese's history, The Golden Giant, was filmed in conjunction with the cheese's production. The Wisconsin Cheese Foundation asked three cheese graders to review the cheese. They rated the slab among the highest grades of cheese.

=== Operation ===
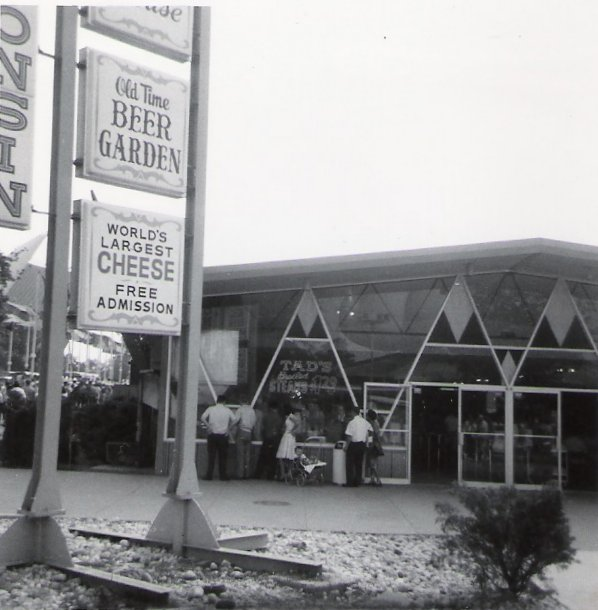
The pavilion during the fair

When the World's Fair formally opened on April 22, 1964, the Wisconsin Pavilion was not complete. Many of the exhibits were ready in time for the fair's opening, including the cheese, but some of the industry exhibits were still under construction. The New York Daily News estimated that the remaining exhibits would not be completed for a week after the fair opened. William Dyke was appointed as the pavilion's project coordinator. The Wisconsin Pavilion was formally dedicated on June 18, 1964, nearly two months after the fair opened. During that month, a scale model of the rotunda was showcased in Madison and Egg Harbor, Wisconsin. The Wisconsin government allocated almost $35,000 to the pavilion's operators during the 1964 season. The pavilion closed when the first season ended on October 18, 1964. During the first season, the pavilion recorded at least 5.5 million visitors, (Note: The Wisconsin State Journal gives a figure of 6 million visitors during 1964.) making it one of the most popular U.S. state pavilions at the fair. Visitors to the Wisconsin Pavilion had consumed 1 million steins of beer, 34 tons of hot dogs, and 125 tons of beef. Olson estimated that visitors had spent $423,000 on merchandise.

In between seasons, the Golden Giant cheese was loaded into the cheesemobile and driven across the United States, where it was displayed in several towns and cities. Although Olson lost reelection as Wisconsin's lieutenant governor in 1964, he remained the chairman of the Wisconsin World's Fair Commission, and he contemplated upgrading the pavilion for the fair's 1965 season. Wisconsin Pavilion Inc. requested in December 1964 that the state government provide $50,000 for the pavilion's operation. Some of these funds would be used to expand an observation area around the pavilion's cheese. Democratic Party legislators in the Wisconsin Senate saw the appropriation as excessive, and the state's lieutenant governor Patrick Lucey saw the building as a "shameful bungle". Nonetheless, in March 1965, the Wisconsin Legislature voted to allocate another $50,000 (equivalent to $526,000 in 2025) to the pavilion; this included $20,000 for an information booth and $10,000 to hire a manager to live at the site. Governor Warren P. Knowles signed the appropriation into law the next month. The Wisconsin Pavilion's operators planned to double the amount of space at the pavilion by adding a picnic area and bandshell.

The pavilion reopened at the beginning of the fair's second season on April 21, 1965. Although a new beer garden and food concessions had been completed, the exhibit in the rotunda was not finished at the time of the fair's reopening. During the second season, a 180-pound (82 kg) Swiss cheese wheel was displayed next to the 35,000-pound cheddar cheese. The New York World's Fair Corporation formally acknowledged July 9, 1965, as Wisconsin Day, and Knowles and Olson attended a celebration at the pavilion on that day. The second season ended on October 17, 1965. In total, the pavilion had accommodated around 13 million visitors during the two seasons; this made it the fair's eighth-most-popular attraction. The pavilion was the third-most-visited structure in the fair's federal and state zone. The Wisconsin Legislature had provided $199,000 (equivalent to $2,033,000 in 2025) for the pavilion's operation over the course of the fair.

== After the fair ==
=== Sale of pavilion and contents ===
All temporary structures on the fairground had to be demolished within 90 days of the fair's closure. Olson began soliciting offers for the Wisconsin Pavilion in July 1965, and he contacted several Wisconsin government agencies to gauge their interest in the pavilion. Although Olson preferred that a state agency take over the pavilion, anyone could submit an offer if they could pay for the pavilion's relocation, which Olson estimated would cost $20,000. One attendee—Ivan Wilcox, a blacksmith from Boscobel, Wisconsin—offered to buy the pavilion for $5,000 (equivalent to $51,082 in 2025). Wilcox had contacted Knowles in an attempt to obtain one of the industrial pavilions, but the structure Wilcox wanted was sold to someone else. Wilcox bought the pavilion shortly after the fair ended. He did not acquire the exhibition wings, which would have been too complicated to relocate. A resort owner from New York offered $22,000 for the pavilion, but Wilcox declined because he wanted to bring the building back to Wisconsin. A group of businessmen from Janesville, Wisconsin, also unsuccessfully tried to buy the building after reading about Wilcox's purchase in a newspaper.

On October 18, Wilcox, his sons, and several Pruden Steel workers went to Flushing Meadows to disassemble the structure, which took five days. Some pieces of the pavilion, including public-announcement systems and lights, had been removed or stolen before the pavilion was disassembled. New York state law required Wilcox to hire a steelworkers union to dismantle the pavilion, but Wilcox instead hired a contractor, even as the New York World's Fair Corporation threatened to fine him for not using union labor. The glass, steelwork, and other design elements were loaded separately into three trucks. (Note: A Boscobel Dial article from October 28, 1965, said Wilcox used four trucks. The Oshkosh Northwestern says that three trucks were used and that one truck returned to collect the rest of the pavilion.) Wilcox's team drove away before union contractors could prevent him from leaving. Most of the rotunda survived intact, but the glass in the pinnacle was damaged after the truck carrying the glass hit a highway overpass in Madison. Wilcox's insurance was for $1,000, less than half the cost of the broken glass. Wilcox had to spend another $2,000 to bring the rest of the rotunda to Boscobel, plus another $6,000 for new glass; he planned to sell the broken glass pieces as souvenirs. By the beginning of November, the pieces of the pavilion had arrived in Boscobel. In total, Wilcox had spent $12,000 relocating the rotunda.

Other pieces of the pavilion were also sold off. Borden Dairy had offered to buy the Golden Giant even before the fair had begun. Borden never received the Golden Giant because of disagreements between local Borden distributors, so the cheese was instead sold to the Wisconsin Cheese Foundation, who began selling sliced-up pieces in October 1965. The Golden Giant was displayed at a convention in Eau Claire, Wisconsin, later that year, and more than 2,000 people bought pieces of the cheese that December at about $2.50 per pound ($5.5/kg). A beer distributor in Hewett, Wisconsin, bought the cheesemobile's truck. Another section of the pavilion became a ski lodge in the Pocono Mountains in Northeastern Pennsylvania, and a playground slide from the pavilion ended up in Weyauwega, Wisconsin. Following the relocation of the pavilion and its contents, the Wisconsin World's Fair Commission was dissolved in December 1965.

=== Resale and relocation to Neillsville ===
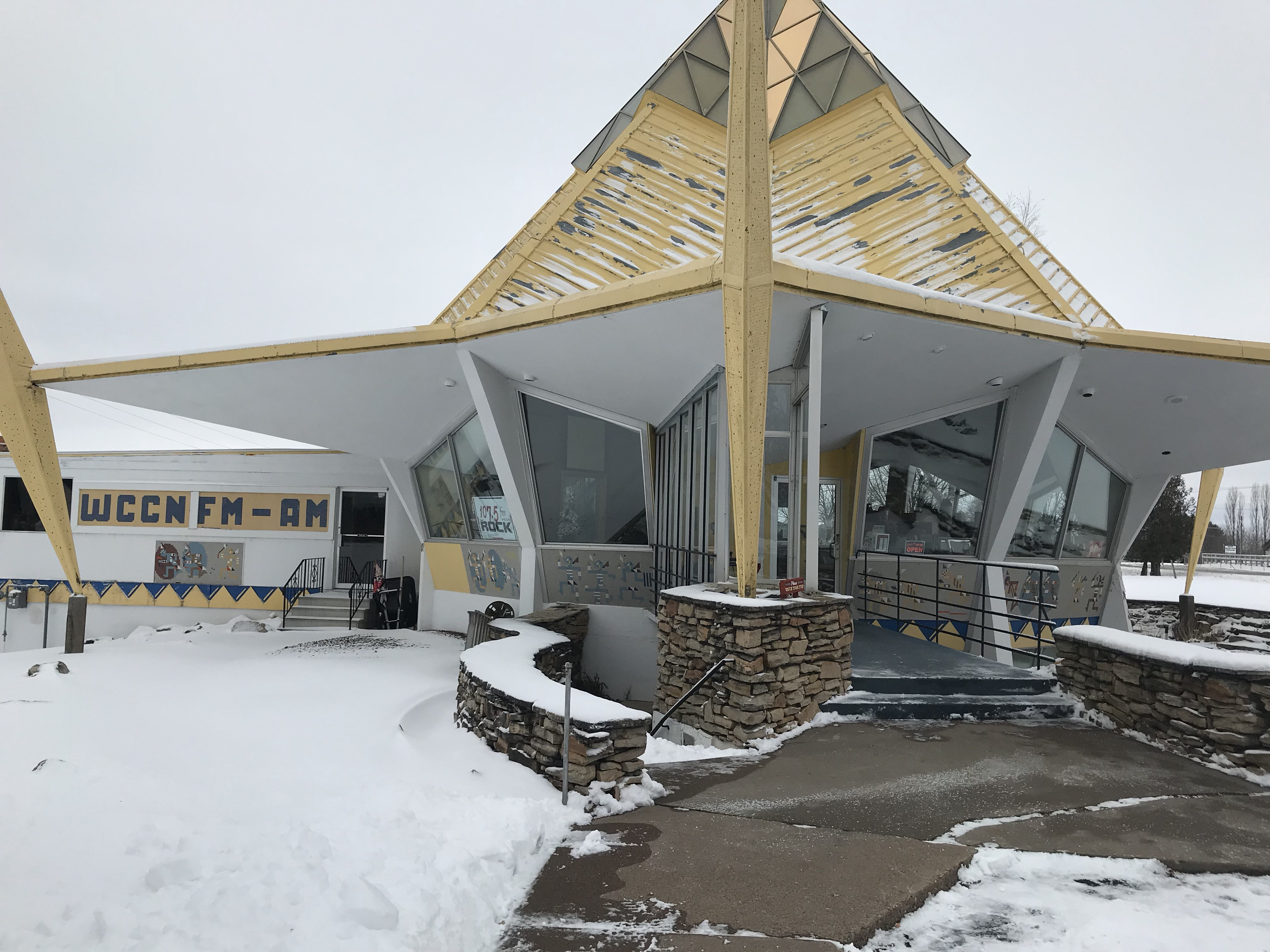
The pavilion's western entrance

Wilcox initially wanted to obtain local support to reassemble the rotunda in Boscobel. However, there was little interest in converting the building to a tourist center or an event venue. Wilcox decided to place the rotunda for sale. Under the conditions that he laid out, the buyer had to keep the pavilion in Wisconsin, and the buyer needed to allow Wilcox to help reassemble the structure. Wilcox rejected several offers for the pavilion, including one offer of $8,000 for the mosaic-tile murals at the rotunda's base. Thirty people submitted bids for the rotunda, though Wilcox recalled that most of the offers came from out of state. Howard Sturtz (the head of Central Wisconsin Broadcasting), along with his partner J. Wayne Grap, bought the structure in November 1965 for $41,000 (equivalent to $418,875 in 2025). (Note: A 1984 article from The Country Today cites the sale price as $43,000.) Central Wisconsin Broadcasting bought a 600-foot (180 m) site along U.S. Route 10 from Harold Trewarhta, with plans to reconstruct the pavilion there. The site, opposite the Clark County Fairground in Neillsville, was selected because of its proximity to a dance hall that Sturtz ran. The site was also higher than the surrounding land.

The first pieces of the rotunda arrived in Neillsville in December 1965, where they were temporarily stored. Wilcox and five other contractors were hired to rebuild the rotunda, which was erected next to the Clark County Fairground. The project involved constructing a rock garden around the structure, as well as a basement underneath, and replacing the original plate glass with insulated glass. Pruden Steel provided additional steel for the rebuilt pavilion, and three other firms worked on the structure. (Note: Excavation firm Boon Brothers, foundation contractor Velousek, and general construction contractor Tesmer Construction) By the end of April 1966, workers were about to begin excavating the basement. After Wisconsin's Industrial Commission approved the building plans that June, reconstruction of the above-ground structure began that summer. The same year, a 16-foot (4.9 m) replica of a Holstein cow was erected in Sparta, Wisconsin, by Sculptured Advertising. The cow, built for Central Wisconsin Broadcasting, was displayed at the Clark County Fair before being moved near the pavilion.

Local media outlets reached out to Sturtz about the building's reconstruction before it was finished, and Governor Knowles visited the pavilion while it was under construction. The cost of reassembling and winterizing the building came to $150,000 (equivalent to $1,448,000 in 2025) and left Sturtz with significant amounts of debt. The pavilion was completed in May 1967. Knowles dedicated the pavilion on July 13, 1967, and five thousand people attended over the next three days. WCCN hosted a naming competition for the talking cow outside the pavilion. A first-grade student from Loyal, Wisconsin, suggested the winning name, "Chatty Belle". Wilcox began selling broken pieces of the pavilion's original glass pinnacle in mid-1967.

=== Later operation ===
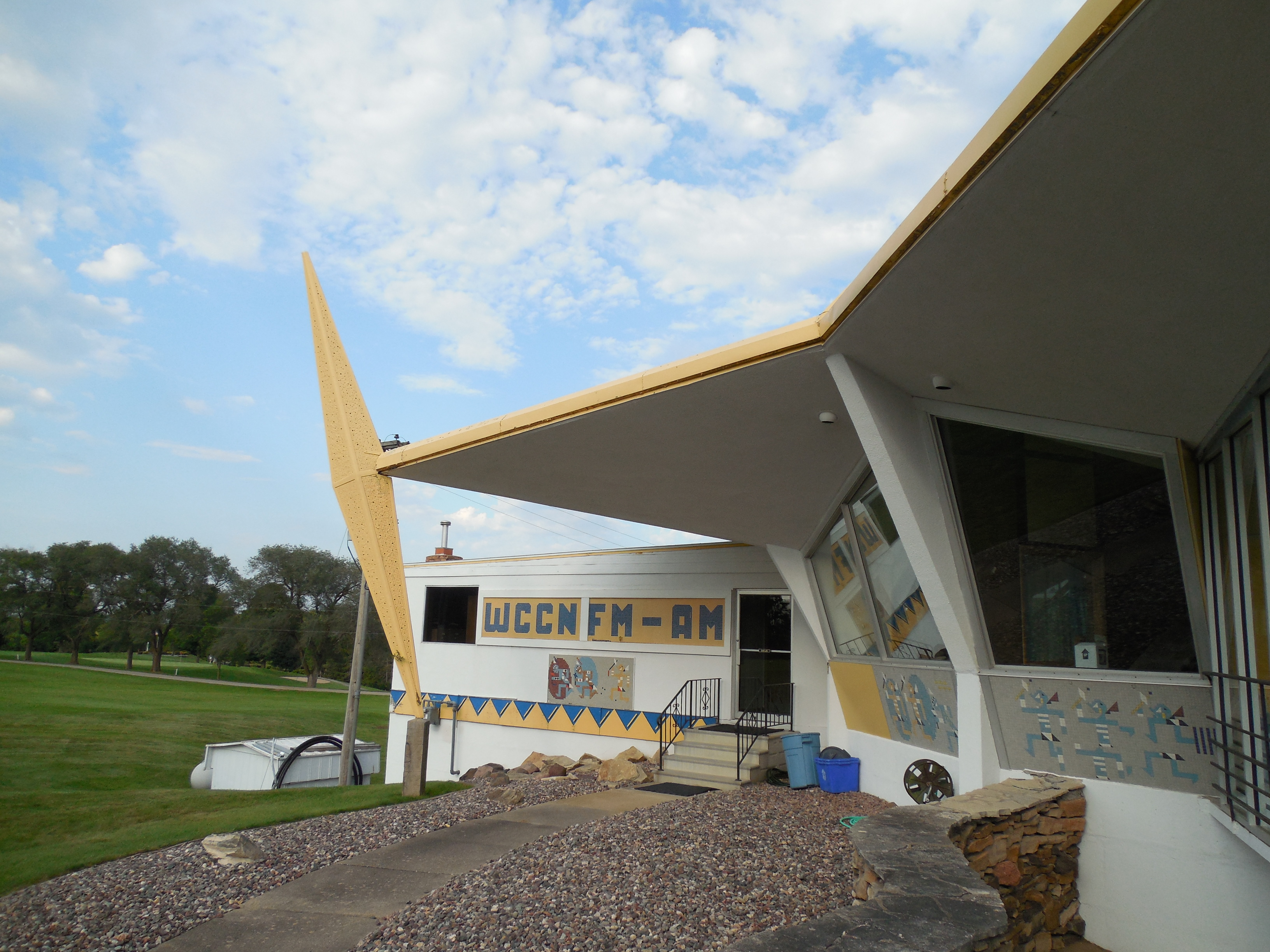
The pavilion's rear annex

When the building reopened, radio stations WCCN AM and FM used it as an office and broadcasting studio. The two radio stations' offices were located in the basement, while their studios were located on a portion of the first floor. The rest of the first floor was used as a tourist center and a gift shop, and two offices in the basement were leased out. Eighty-nine types of cheese were sold at the pavilion. In the pavilion's first nine weeks, it recorded 15,000 visitors from around the world. Two local dairy owners, Bill and Beverly Schwantes, bought a replica of the Golden Giant. The Schwantes family also bought back the cheesemobile's trailer from the Borden Company and renovated the trailer, which was moved next to the pavilion in early July 1967. The fake cheese was displayed in the cheesemobile. In 1968, WCCN, the Wisconsin Cheese Foundation, and local cheese manufacturers raised money to buy the cheesemobile's truck, which was refurbished and moved next to the pavilion.

For four decades after Wilcox sold the pavilion, he continued to visit it sporadically. Sturtz owned the Wisconsin Pavilion until 1976, when he transferred ownership of the pavilion, along with his stake in the WCCN stations and Central Wisconsin Broadcasting, to J. Wayne Grap. The following year, to celebrate WCCN-AM's 20th anniversary, an annex with an AM broadcast studio and three offices was completed. Wayne's son Kevin, along with Kevin's wife Margaret (Peggy), bought the pavilion in either 1985 or 1986. During that decade, the cheesemobile trailer remained parked outside the pavilion, but it was empty. Chatty Belle continued to stand next to the pavilion, and a steam tractor was displayed nearby. The pavilion was still used as a broadcasting studio, and it also included a local chamber of commerce, offices, and a beauty salon. Among its tenants was a company named the Highground, which occupied one of the offices until 1990.

The building remained a tourist attraction in the 1990s and 2000s, and it became a well-known symbol of Neillsville. During the early 21st century, Kevin and Peggy Grap continually maintained the grounds and repainted the roof regularly. Radio station WPKG FM started broadcasting from the building in 2004. The structure was added to the Wisconsin Register of Historic Places in 2010. It was listed on the National Register of Historic Places two years later, following an effort by local historian Pat Lacey. As of 2026, the Grap family still owned the pavilion; Kevin Grap said that 10,000 people annually came to see Chatty Belle.

== Description ==
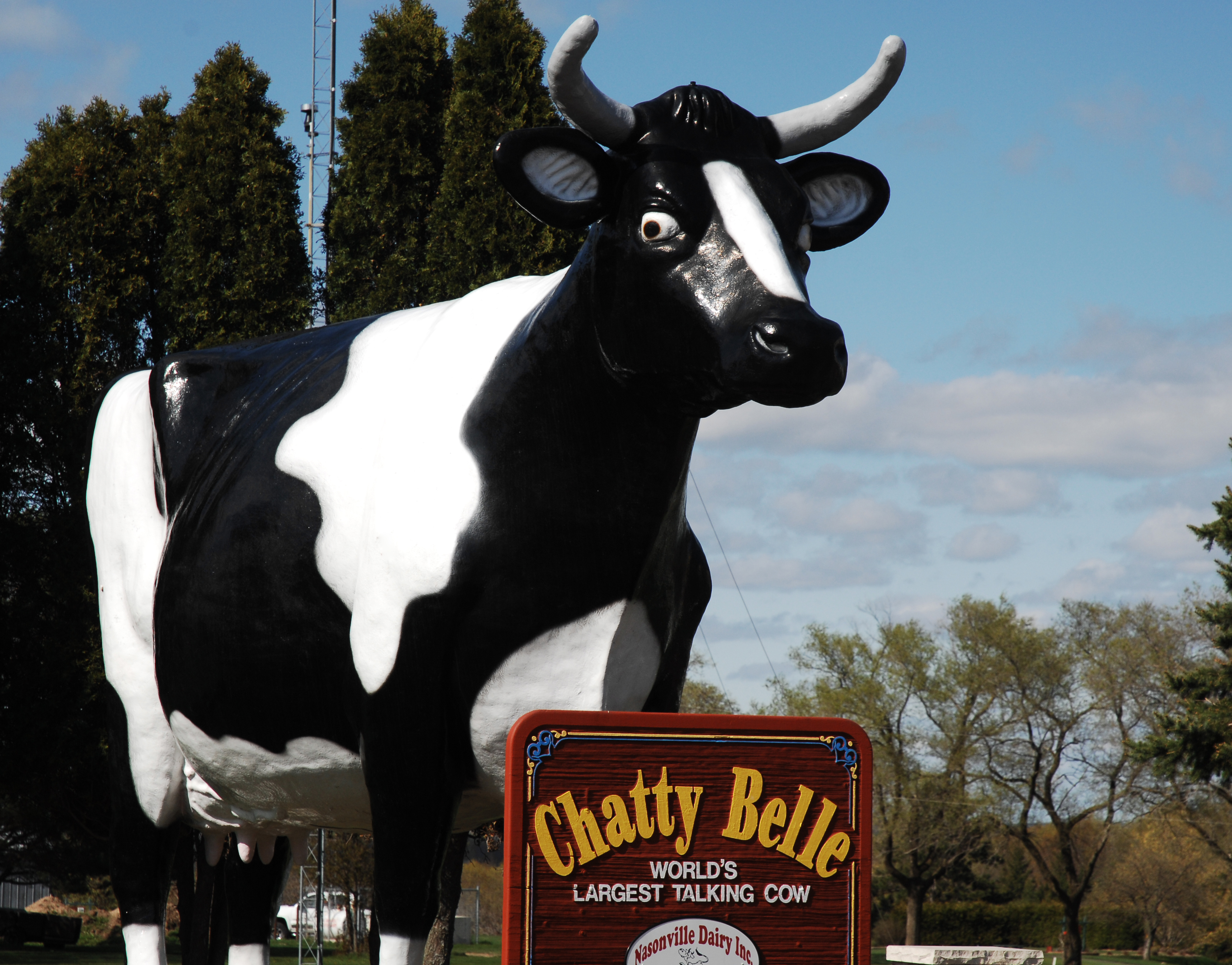
Chatty Belle

The Wisconsin Pavilion is located at 1201 East Division Street (U.S. Route 10) in Neillsville, Wisconsin, United States. The radio stations WCCN AM and FM broadcast out of the pavilion, as does the FM radio station WPKG. The building also houses a gift shop. The modernist–style structure was designed by John Steinmann, an architect from Wisconsin. It incorporates pieces of prefabricated steel sheds, which were donated by Pruden Products of Evansville.

=== Site ===
The Wisconsin Pavilion is located on a 5-acre (2.0 ha) plot of land in southeastern Neillsville. There are fountains outside the pavilion; news articles from 1967 described the grounds as having three pools, each with its own fountain. When the structure was moved from New York City to Neillsville, Steinmann re-landscaped the site, adding a lawn to complement the design of the golf course that abutted the property. Around the southern half of the pavilion is a sunken areaway with a rock garden, which is spanned by two small concrete bridges. As built, the rock garden included water pools. Stairways under the bridges lead to a path made of flagstone. In addition, a parking lot was added outside the pavilion. Near the building is a truck trailer, which displays a replica of the cheddar cheese that was exhibited at the pavilion during the World's Fair. The cheese replica has been described as being made out of either plywood or cardboard. There is also a steam tractor displayed next to the pavilion.

The grounds include a model of a talking cow named Chatty Belle. The cow measures 16 feet (4.9 m) tall and 20 feet (6.1 m) long and is made of fiberglass. (Note: A Marshfield News-Herald article gives a different height of 14 feet (4.3 m).) There is a voice box under Chatty Belle's chin. When visitors insert 25 cents into a coin-operated machine next to the cow, the voice box plays a recording. The recordings are narrated by gift shop's employees and are swapped out throughout the year. Originally, there was also a fiberglass model of a heifer named Bullet, but it was vandalized. The heifer was either thrown away or placed in storage. A Marshfield News-Herald article from 2014 reported that Chatty Belle had become a local tourist attraction.

=== Form and facade ===
The building is a twelve-sided structure. According to Steinmann, the central rotunda's massing "was prompted by the shape of an Indian tepee", which was intended to attract visitors at the 1964 fair. The history writers Jim Draeger and Daina Penkunias said the design reflected "a naive and stereotypical view of Indian culture" that was influenced significantly by the popular media. News sources from 1964 describe the pavilion as being clad with bronze-gold metal, though a National Park Service report from 2012 described the exterior as yellow. The basement was constructed when the building was moved to Neillsville, but everything above the basement was part of the original rotunda in Flushing Meadows. At the rear of the rotunda is a one-story, flat-roofed wing measuring 18 by 36 feet (5.5 by 11.0 m).

==== Basement ====
When the building was situated in Flushing Meadows–Corona Park, it was placed on a concrete foundation slab, with piers made of concrete. These concrete piers concealed the steel trusses inside. After the structure was relocated to Neillsville, the contractors built a basement with twelve concrete foundation piers, which are much larger than the original piers that held up the building in Flushing Meadows. The basement piers are shaped like wedges, which narrow at a 15-degree angle as they ascend toward ground level. The piers divide the facade into twelve bays. The southern elevation of the basement facade faces the rock garden, while the northern elevation of the basement is surrounded by concrete blocks. There are window openings in the basement, with yellow panels below them and sculpted panels with chevron patterns above, in addition to two doors leading from the rock garden into the basement.

==== Ground story and roof ====
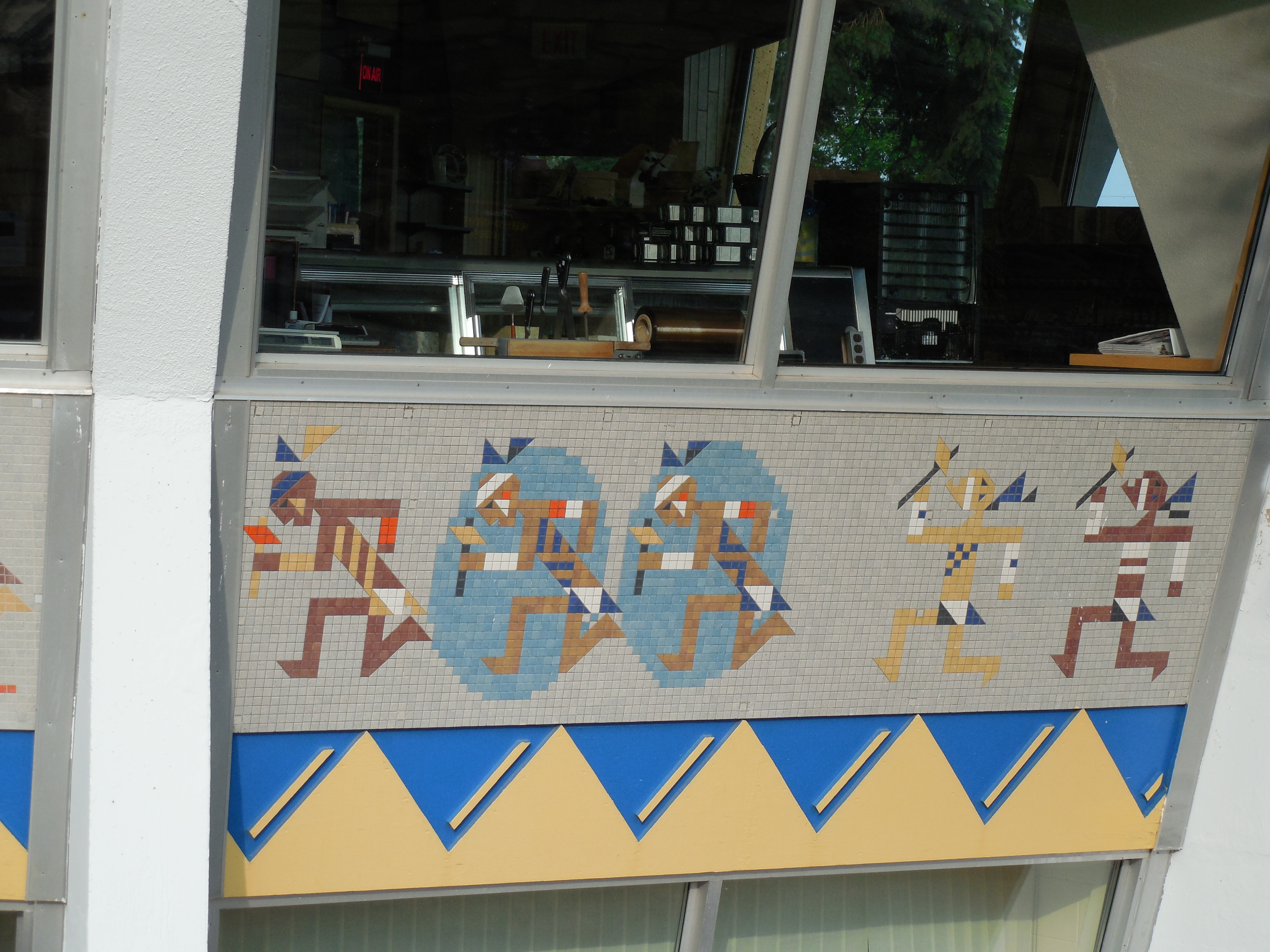
Multicolored mosaic tiles on the first floor, depicting Native Americans

At the ground story, above the basement piers, there are additional piers shaped like inverted wedges, which widen at a 15-degree angle as they ascend. At the tops of these piers, open-web steel trusses support the ceiling. The trusses were manufactured at the Pruden factory in Evansville; these trusses were used because they were lighter than solid beams. Near the bottom of the ground-story facade is a 36-inch-high (91 cm) band of multicolored mosaic tiles depicting Native Americans. Above these mosaics, each bay has two trapezoidal windows; the tops of each window are slanted because there are sloped canopies above it. During the World's Fair, the building had plate-glass windows, but these were replaced with insulated glass when the pavilion was moved to Neillsville. The concrete bridges across the rock garden lead to glass doorways on the western and eastern elevations. The rest of the ground-story facade is covered in white paint.

Six triangular canopies protrude from the facade above the windows. The central portion of each canopy's underside is low to the ground, with the ceiling sloping upward to the right and left. Each canopy's underside is painted white and contains spotlights, while the rooftop of each canopy is painted yellow. The canopies extend outward to yellow rhombus-shaped pylons with tiny holes. The pylons are slanted outward at 15-degree angles and are about twice as high as the canopies. The tops of the pylons are tapered. The roof, including the canopies, measures about 94 feet (29 m) wide when measured from pylon to pylon.

The trusses above the first story are concealed by folded-plate steel roof panels, which were also manufactured at the Pruden factory. There are twelve roof panels, which contain ribbed patterns and are tapered toward their tops. At the center of the roof is a skylight with 120 pieces of glass, which were originally laminated in shades of gold and blue. These colors were used because they were the state's official colors; by the 2010s, these had been replaced with green and gold glass. The center of the roof originally measured 30 feet (9.1 m) high, though a National Park Service report from 2012 cites the roof as measuring 46 feet (14 m) high. The skylight is surmounted by a triangular spire measuring 50 feet (15 m) high. Each side of the spire is decorated with letters spelling out the name "Wisconsin"; the letters each measure 2 feet (0.61 m) tall and consist of cast metal. When the building was relocated to Neillsville, the structure was outfitted with 57 spotlights, while the spire was retrofitted with a blue beacon.

=== Interior ===
At the World's Fair, the rotunda had about 2,000 square feet (190 m^{2}) of exhibit space for Wisconsin governmental departments. Although the building was air-conditioned during the fair, it did not have any heating until it was relocated to Neillsville. A new air-conditioning system was also added after the structure was relocated. Aluminum, glass, and wrought iron finishes, as well as wood panels and red carpets, were added to the interior when the pavilion was moved to Neillsville.

The current main level contains about 1,969 square feet (182.9 m^{2}) and is 48 feet (15 m) wide. (Note: Contemporary sources cited a diameter of about 50 feet (15 m).) Following various modifications over the years, it has been divided into four sections. The southern half of the main level contains a store, which, by the 2010s, contained a scale model of the building, in addition to items from the 1964 fair. The northern half includes radio broadcasting studios and a mezzanine. Within the studio portion of the building is a staircase leading up to the mezzanine and down to the basement; this staircase has open stair risers and a metal balustrade. There is also a skylight at the center of the building, underneath the pinnacle of the roof.

The mezzanine level has three offices, which are immediately above the main level's broadcasting studios. The offices, extending outward from the pavilion's core, have wooden walls and are accessed by balconies on the mezzanine level. The basement has five offices in addition to a pair of restrooms. At the rear of the building is a basement space with heating equipment, as well as a one-story annex above the wing.

== Reception and impact ==
When the building was under construction, the Two Rivers Reporter described it as a "Frank Lloyd Wright–style building", while the Iron County Miner said it "has already been acclaimed as one of the best-looking buildings at the fair". According to the Miner, the structure had been variously called a "handsome twentieth century tepee" and a "modern jewel". William Everett Potter, the executive vice president of the New York World's Fair Corporation, praised the pavilion as one of the best-run exhibits at the fair. Conversely, the Waukesha County Freeman wrote that the pavilion had few draws beside the large cheese and that the exhibits glossed over important aspects of Wisconsin's industry, such as machine tools. Following the first season, the Boscobel Dial wrote that the success of Wisconsin's pavilion was worth having "a few thousand tourists bypassing Wisconsin to attend the fair". The Capital Times of Madison, on the other hand, regarded the pavilion as a waste of money, preferring that visitors to the exhibit instead spend their money in Wisconsin.

After the fair ended, the Wisconsin Dells Events wrote that the pavilion "was not the fanciest, of course, but an excellent job of promotion was done for the funds available", predicting that the pavilion would have a positive impact on the state. The Beaver Dam Daily Citizen described the structure as "a pinnacle of man's ingenuity for the nation's dairylanders". A Country Today article from 2013 described the building as resembling a Space Age structure and characterized it as "a favorite in all of Neillsville's tour guides". In 2014, Jim Draeger and Daina Penkunias wrote for the Wisconsin Magazine of History that the design reflected the improvements in construction materials and methods that had taken place during and after World War II.

When the building was reconstructed in Neillsville in 1966, a local group called the Black River Country Association adopted a depiction of the building as its symbol. Images of Chatty Belle were used in advertising campaigns in the late 20th century, and footage of the cow was used in the 2000 comedy Chump Change. Kevin Grap said the cow's presence had brought attention both to Neillsville and to the dairy industry.

== See also ==
- 1964 New York World's Fair pavilions
- National Register of Historic Places listings in Clark County, Wisconsin
