= 1964 New York World's Fair pavilions =

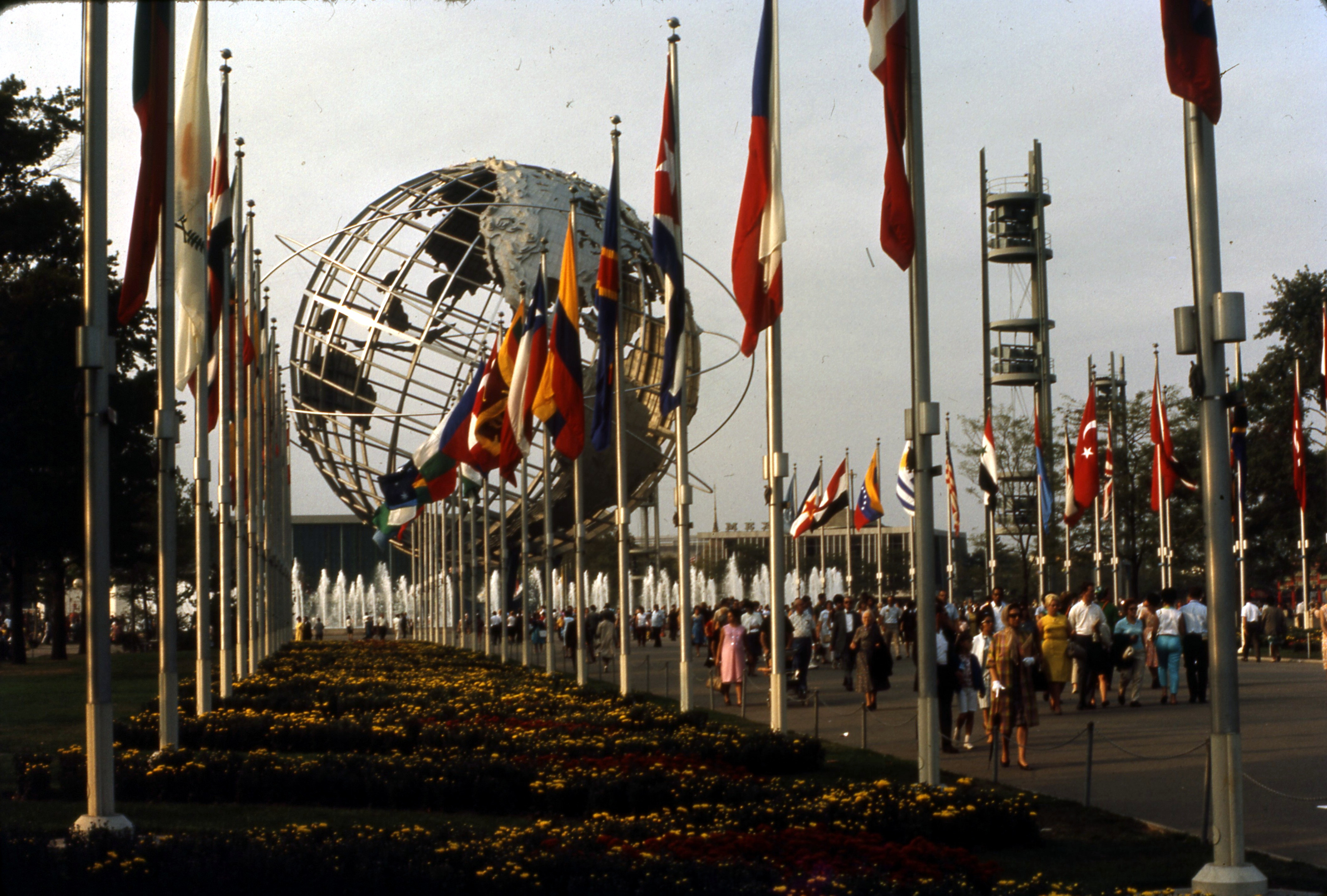
The Unisphere at the fair

The 1964 New York World's Fair took place at Flushing Meadows–Corona Park in Queens, New York, United States, during 1964 and 1965. The fair included 139 pavilions with exhibits by 80 nations, 24 U.S. states, and 350 corporations. The exhibits were split across five regions—the Federal and State, International, Transportation, Amusement, and Industrial areas—which in turn were centered around the Unisphere.

The New York World's Fair 1964 Corporation (WFC) oversaw the 1964 fair and leased out the land to exhibitors, who developed their own pavilions. The different sections were designed in various architectural styles. Anyone could rent exhibition space as long as they could afford to rent the land and pay for their pavilion, though U.S. state pavilions could rent land for free. Many nations from Asia, Africa, and Central and South America, though relatively few from Europe, exhibited at the fair. The fairground also hosted many large corporations, in addition to eight religious pavilions, a fraternal order pavilion, and other exhibits. After the fair, some pavilions were preserved or relocated, but the vast majority of structures were demolished.

== Background ==
=== Fair ===
The New York World's Fair 1964 Corporation (WFC) was formed in 1959 to organize a world's fair in New York City during 1964. The Bureau International des Expositions (BIE) refused to formally approve the 1964 New York World's Fair, despite advocacy from WFC president Robert Moses. Moses wanted to save the WFC money by having exhibitors erect most of their own pavilions. Nearly all buildings were to be temporary structures. Exhibitors designed their own pavilions, and the construction contractors hired members of local labor unions to build the structures. William Everett Potter, who was hired to organize the exhibits, predicted that the pavilions would use relatively novel construction methods such as structural plastics, thin-shell structures, and prestressed concrete. Construction of the first building began in 1960. The World's Fair officially opened on April 22, 1964, and its first season ended on October 18, 1964. The fair reopened for a second and final season on April 21, 1965, closing on October 18, 1965.

The fairground was divided into five regions, centered around the Unisphere, a representation of the Earth designed by Gilmore D. Clarke and constructed by the American Bridge Company. Exhibits for individual U.S. states and the U.S. federal government were concentrated in the Federal & State Area at the center of the fairground near the Unisphere. The international exhibits were concentrated in the International Area—a group of pavilions surrounding the Unisphere. Industry pavilions were concentrated around the Industrial Area on the eastern end near the Van Wyck Expressway. The Transportation Area was on the western side of the fairground. South of the Long Island Expressway, connected with the rest of the fair only via one overpass, was the Lake Amusement Area. The 1964 World's Fair had 139 pavilions and 34 other attractions on its opening day. (Note: This is sometimes cited as more than 200 exhibits and pavilions.) Either 121 or 124 pavilions and attractions were free; the rest required an additional payment. The last pavilion to be completed was the Belgian Village, which was not finished until the end of the 1964 season.

No new pavilions were planned for the 1965 season because it would be costly and time-consuming to add any such pavilions. Between the 1964 and 1965 seasons, several exhibitors renovated and modified their pavilions. At least fifty exhibits were upgraded, and five major attractions were added. Some exhibitors increased the capacity of their attractions, while other pavilions received new exhibits or interior renovations. The Florida pavilion took over much of the Lake Amusement Area, which became known as the Lake Area.

=== Pavilions ===
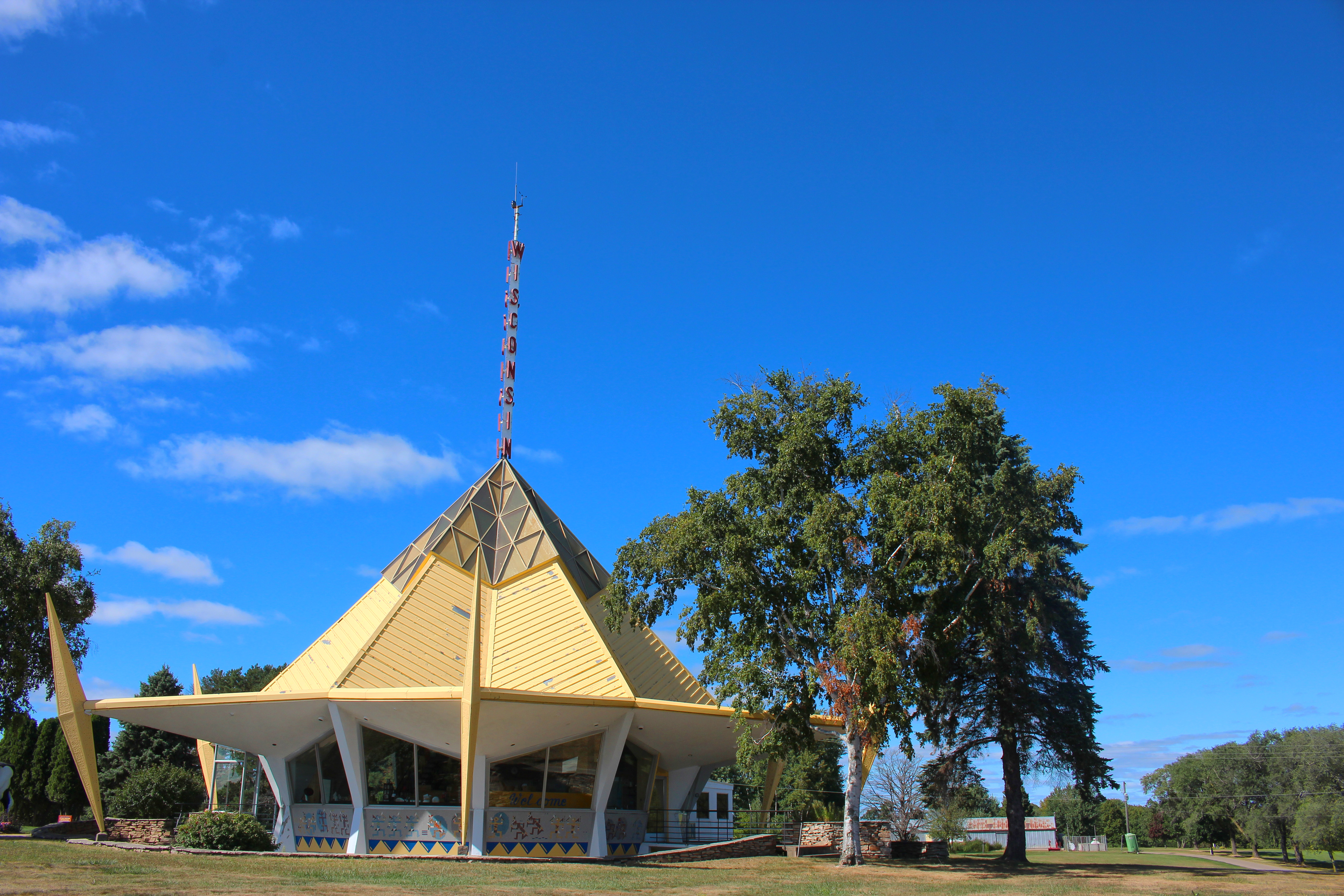
The Wisconsin Pavilion, which has since been relocated to Neillsville, Wisconsin

The different sections were designed in various architectural styles, and many of the pavilions were designed in a Space Age style. The New York Times described the buildings as a collection of "domes, disks, cubes, spires, pylons, ovoids, arches, triangles, curves and soaring free forms." Elliptical forms and disks were used extensively throughout the fair, and several pavilions used experimental designs, such as the Bell System, GE, IBM, Kodak, and Port Authority pavilions. Most structures were designed so they could be demolished easily after the fair and rebuilt elsewhere. Some of these pavilions, such as the Schaefer Brewing Company Pavilion, were inflatable structures. Most of the state pavilions, and many of the industrial and transportation pavilions, were wheelchair-accessible. However, many of the international pavilions were not fully accessible because these pavilions were often designed in traditional architectural styles.

Anyone could rent exhibition space as long as they could afford to rent the land, and pay for their pavilion. Thus, the space was dominated by large corporations. Private companies spent a combined $300 million on their pavilions, and companies such as General Motors and Ford Motor Company spent tens of millions of dollars apiece. Several companies funded their pavilions by reducing promotional spending elsewhere. The Walt Disney Company manufactured several exhibits but did not itself have a pavilion. There were several religious pavilions scattered across the fairground, in addition to one fraternal order pavilion (the Masonic pavilion). Initially, Moses refused to construct structures for the arts, education, or sciences. The General Motors and Vatican City pavilions were the fair's most popular exhibits.

WFC rules officially prevented the fair's officials from influencing the design or contents of any exhibits, although in practice, WFC officials had a significant impact on the contents of exhibits. For example, developing nations were encouraged to showcase their art and culture, rather than technology, and WFC officials pressured Islamic nations to emphasize their religion.

== U.S. state and territory pavilions ==
Twenty-three state pavilions were built. The fair included exhibits from 24 states, including Alaska, Florida, Hawaii, Illinois, Louisiana, Maryland, Minnesota, Missouri, Montana, New Jersey, New York, Oklahoma, Tennessee, Texas, West Virginia, Wisconsin, and the six states in New England. In addition, New York City had its own pavilion, as did the neighborhood of Hollywood, Los Angeles. Nineteen of the state pavilions were in the federal and state section, and three of the other four state pavilions were clustered around Meadow Lake at the southern end of the fair. None of the state governments had to pay rent for the pavilion. State governments still had to pay for their own pavilions, and about half the states and Washington, D.C., did not pay for exhibits at the fair. Pavilions for the states of Alabama, Georgia, and Arkansas, as well as the commonwealth of Puerto Rico, were canceled before the fair formally opened.

Notable pavilions
Pavilion	Section	Architects	Description	Refs.
Alaska	Federal and State	Olson & Sands, Mandeville & Berge, and Walter Stengel	A replica of an igloo, with three totem poles originally carved for the Louisiana Purchase Exposition in 1904. It included Native Alaskan dances, native crafts, modern items, and exhibits of animal heads. A diorama of Alaska from the Century 21 Exposition was also displayed.	
Florida	Lake Amusement	Pancoast, Ferendino, Crafton, Keels & Burnham	Included a 110-foot tower, 1,600-seat stadium, boardwalk, and exhibit hall. A model of a two-bedroom colonial house was also displayed at the Florida pavilion. During the 1965 season, the Florida pavilion took over an adjacent 8,000-seat amphitheater, where it hosted a water-ski show.	
Hawaii	Lake Amusement	Reino Aarnio	Included an 80-foot-tall (24 m) tower, a hexagonal pavilion, a 500-seat restaurant, an exhibit building, a shopping arcade, a theater, and a replica of an ancient village.	
Hollywood	Federal and State	Randall Duell Inc., Donald Schwenn, and Oppenheimer, Brady & Lehrecke Associates	A replica of the Chinese Theatre with movie sets, a film museum, and cutouts of celebrities.	
Illinois	Federal and State	SOM	A brick building with curved walls and a courtyard. It included an Audio-Animatronic figure of Abraham Lincoln.	
Louisiana (Bourbon Street)	Federal and State	Albert C. Ledner, Saputo & Rowe, and Furman & Furman	A replica of Bourbon Street in New Orleans, with restaurants and dancing.	
Maryland	Federal and State	Tatar & Kelly, and Van Rosen Schwab Associates (architects); Paul Carreiro (designer)	A fisherman's wharf with a restaurant and a short film.	
Minnesota	Federal and State	Edgar Tafel & Associates (architect); James R. Dresser & Associates (designer)	A polygonal structure with a moat around it. The pavilion included a restaurant with over 100 dishes. The Kensington Runestone, a purported Viking artifact that most scholars consider to be fake or a hoax, was brought in as a featured exhibit partway through the fair.	
Missouri	Federal and State	Kivett & Myers and Daniel Schwartzman	A rectangular glass structure with a snack bar, souvenir shop, and replicas of the Spirit of St. Louis plane and the Friendship 7 space capsule.	
Montana	Federal and State	Oswald, Berg & Associates	A replica frontier town. It included a "museum on wheels" with artwork by Frederic Remington and Charles Marion Russell, as well as Native American dance performances and a replica of gold nuggets.	
New England	Federal and State	Campbell & Aldrich	A replica of a New England town square with stores, and exhibits about each of the six New England states. The structure consisted of glass, wood, and marble hexagonal modules. There was a country store, village green, and a restaurant.	
New Jersey	Federal and State	Philip Sheridan Collins (architect); Yang Gardiner Associates (designer)	A set of 21 vinyl-roofed structures, representing the counties in New Jersey, supported by pylons and placed around a reflecting pool. Inside each structure were films, live performances, and historic displays about New Jersey.	
New Mexico	Federal and State	William Leftwich	A structure designed to resemble a pueblo, with Native American crafts showcased across five buildings.	
New York City	Federal and State	Aymar Embury II (original architect); Daniel Chait (renovation architect); Lester Associates (designer)	A building with a scale model of New York City (Panorama of the City of New York), an ice-skating rink, a short film about the Triborough Bridge and Tunnel Authority, and exhibits about the city's history. The structure was preserved from the 1939 fair.	
New York State	Federal and State	Philip Johnson Associates	Consisted of the Tent of Tomorrow exhibition space; three observation towers; and the Theaterama, with art exhibits and a 360-degree film about the state. The state exhibit was the tallest structure in the fair, at 226 feet (69 m).	
Oklahoma	Federal and State	Howard-Samis-Davies	A park containing a music bandshell, an enlarged state seal of Oklahoma, and a map of Oklahoma.	
Oregon	Industrial	—N/a	A live performance area on the shore of the Flushing River, surrounded by a 1,250-seat bleacher. Included activities such as jousting, wrestling, axe-throwing, log-rolling, and tree-chopping.	
Pennsylvania	Federal and State	—N/a	A Liberty Bell replica that operated only during the 1965 season.	
Texas	Lake Amusement	Randall Duell	A 2,400-seat music hall that presented various musicals, along with a 650-seat nightclub-bar. Operated only during the 1964 season, as it filed for bankruptcy in July 1964.	
United States	Federal and State	Charles Luckman Associates	A boxy structure with a translucent facade, surrounded by a moat. Inside was a 600-seat theater with a short film; a dark ride-style attraction with scenes from American history; four exhibit spaces; and a museum area. A hall of presidents was added for the 1965 season, along with an exhibit called Challenge to Greatness.	
West Virginia	Federal and State	Irving Bowman & Associates and Frederic P. Wiedersum Associates	A mountain lodge. It included glass-blowing and coal exhibits, and raffles for a mountaintop and race horse. In addition, the West Virginia Department of Commerce had staff in the pavilion, who invited businesspeople to invest in the state's industries.	
Wisconsin	Federal and State	John Steinmann	A teepee-shaped structure. It included a huge slice of cheese, a trout fishing exhibit, and fly casting demonstrations.	

== International pavilions ==
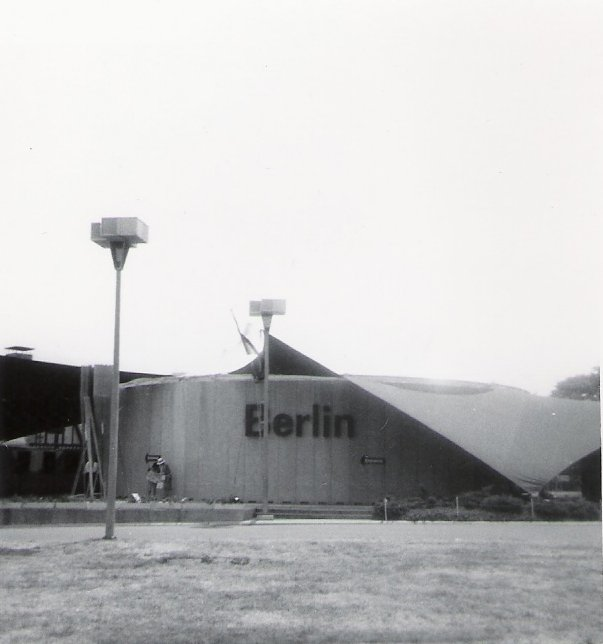
West Berlin pavilion

There were 45 pavilions in the International Area, most of which featured foreign countries' exhibits. Individual exhibits were presented by 66 nations, including the United States. If nations that were represented only by one city or region are included, (Note: For example, West Germany, which was represented by West Berlin) the fair featured attractions from 80 countries. Many nations from Asia, Africa, and Central and South America, though relatively few from Europe, exhibited at the fair. Among the countries with official exhibits were Guinea, India, Indonesia, Ireland, Jordan, Lebanon, Malaysia, Mexico, Pakistan, the Philippines, Sierra Leone, South Korea, Spain, Sudan, Taiwan, Thailand, the United Arab Republic, and Venezuela. Other nations set up unofficial exhibits, including Austria, Denmark, Greece, Sweden, and Switzerland, as well as the colony of Hong Kong and the enclave of West Berlin. Japan set up both an official and an unofficial exhibit. Foreign nations rented the land from the WFC, and they also paid for lodging, food, and other expenses for their staff.

Numerous BIE members did not participate in the fair. These included members of the Commonwealth of Nations, like the United Kingdom, as well as many nations from western Europe. Communist countries boycotted or were disinvited from the fair. Lebanon was the only BIE member with an official exhibit, though some BIE members did host unofficial exhibits or were represented by private companies' exhibits. The privately sponsored pavilions generally showcased commercial products instead of exhibits about their respective nations' cultures. The WFC encouraged BIE members' governments to lend art to their countries' unofficial exhibits, and several BIE members (including Italy and France) even tried to subsidize their respective unofficial exhibits. Other countries were represented by regional pavilions, such as the Caribbean and African pavilions. The fair also attracted many countries that were not BIE members.

Fifty countries displayed craftwork or items manufactured in their respective nations. Many of the international pavilions also sold merchandise, as did the International Plaza.

Notable pavilions (Note: The Vatican City pavilion is detailed in § Religious pavilions.)
Pavilion	Section	Architects	Description	Refs.
African	International	Kahn & Jacobs (architect); Tom John (designer)	A group of 24 huts, each depicting a Sub-Saharan African nation. The huts included shops, exhibits, entertainment, and a movie theater, as well as a faux banyan tree at the center. The structure also contained a restaurant decorated with items from Africa. For 1965, an electronic big-game hunting activity was added.	
American-Israel	International	Ira Kessler & Associates	A helical structure with mahogany cladding. Inside was a hall with three sections focusing on ancient Israel, modern Israel, and Jewish diaspora. It also contained a mural and a poem calling for world peace, installed in response to another mural in the Jordan pavilion.	
Austria	International	Gustav Peichl and Pisani & Carlos	A timber structure supported by "A"-shaped frames. There was an abstract sculpture next to the pavilion and an exhibit of sculptures and photographs under the pavilion. Inside was a music hall and color transparencies.	
Belgian Village	International	Alfons de Ridjt and Hooks & Wax	A group of 124 buildings (including houses and a church), surrounding cobblestone streets and a town square. Inside were restaurants and exhibit spaces.	
Caribbean	International	Emery Roth & Sons (architect); J. Amable Frometa Pereyra, Edgardo Vega Malagon, and Morris Lapidus Associates (designers)	A pair of Spanish-tile structures with shops and a restaurant-bar, flanking a flagstone terrace.	
Centralamerica and Panama	International	Frederico Morales and Hooks & Wax	A structure made of white stone, with exhibits and events from six Central American countries. The pavilion mostly exhibited art from Central America and a film about tourist attractions in the region, and there was also a cafe. In 1965, Panama did not exhibit at the pavilion, which was renamed the Central America pavilion.	
Denmark	International	Erik Møller (architect); Werner, Jensen & Korst (designer)	A wood-and-glass structure with a miniature version of the Tivoli Gardens park. There were also exhibits, stores, and two eateries.	
Greece	International	Anthony Kitsikis, Athanase Makris, and John James Carlos	A modern-style structure with a classical Greek doorway and a mural above. Inside were murals and other displays about Greece's history and economy, in addition to a restaurant.	
Guinea	International	—N/a	A group of three structures, accessed by a bridge over a stream. The largest structure is a round glass-walled building with ballet performances. The two smaller buildings had a store, exhibits, and tourist information center.	
Hong Kong	International	Eldredge Snyder	A building with exhibit spaces, a restaurant, shops, a garden, and replicas of three Chinese junks. The garden also included a replica of a Forbidden City bridge and a lagoon. There was a store where visitors could order custom clothing.	
India	International	Mansinh Rana (architect); Stonorov & Haws (designers)	A pair of buildings connected by a courtyard. One of the buildings was a glass-and-stone structure with exhibits and shops, while the other was a restaurant.	
Indonesia	International	R. M. Sudarsono (architect); Max O. Urbahn and Abel Sorensen (designers)	An exhibition building with a pagoda in front of it. Inside were exhibits relating to Indonesian culture, tourism, trade, and politics. The Indonesian pavilion operated only during the 1964 season; it withdrew in 1965 due to the United States' support for Malaysia.	
International Plaza	International	Ira Kessler & Associates	A 2-acre (0.81 ha) plaza, where items from various countries were sold. There were displays, restaurants, snack bars, and stores sponsored by countries, trade organizations, and the United Nations.	
Ireland	International	Andrew Devane (architect); George Nelson & Co. (designer)	A two-story stone-and-concrete building with a courtyard. Inside was a cafe, displays about Irish culture, dance performances, and a film screening. The displays included a replica of an Irish watchtower and artifacts like glass products, manuscripts, harps, and tweeds.	
Japan	International	Kunio Maekawa	A set of three structures designed in contemporary and ancient Japanese styles. The main building was a replica of a castle carved by Masayuki Nagare, which was made of lava rock and surrounded by a moat. Inside were displays of Japanese inventions, judo and kendo martial-art demonstrations, dance performances, and restaurants.	
Jordan	International	Victor Bisharat and James A. Evans	A structure with an undulating concrete roof. Inside were dance performances, a movie, exhibits about Jordan's economy, and a bazaar. The pavilion had a poem and a mural about the oppression of the Palestinian people, which was highly controversial.	
Lebanon	International	Assem Salam, Pierre el-Khoury, Justin Henshell, and Edward A. Weed Associates	A group of rectangular buildings surrounding a courtyard. Inside were objects such as fossils and Lebanese artifacts, as well as a bazaar and restaurant.	
Malaysia	International	Tippetts-Abbett-McCarthy-Stratton (architect); Paul Leung (designer)	A two-story building with displays about the states of Malaysia. The ground floor included scale models and a lily pond, while the second floor had exhibits about the Malaysian economy and a movie theater. There was also a restaurant with Malaysian art.	
Mexico	International	Pedro Ramírez Vázquez, Rafael Mijares A. de la Pena, and Eduardo Terrazas de la Pena	A main pavilion and a standalone restaurant building. The main building was a concrete-and-steel structure above an open-air plaza with a reflecting pool. On the first floor was an exhibit space with maps, scale models, photographs, and exhibits of art and architecture; there was also a mezzanine with Mexican crafts and products. Some exhibits were replaced with artwork during 1965.	
Morocco	International	Charles James Koulbanis (architect); Franz Schwenk (designer)	A Moorish-style structure with a bazaar, restaurant, nightclub, information booth, and exhibits with Moroccan art and objects.	
Pakistan	International	Oppenheimer, Brady & Lehrecke	A structure with a petal-shaped pinnacle. Inside were displays that included both ancient artifacts and a model of Pakistan's new capital, Islamabad. There was also a restaurant under the dome.	
Paris	International	—N/a	A re-creation of a Parisian street with several shops. The structure included exhibits on sectors of the French economy, such as tourism, arts, industry, and science. There was also a restaurant and wine cellar.	
Philippines	International	Ottilio A. Arellano and Jeffrey Ellis Aronin	A two-story, hat-shaped timber structure with decorations made of rare wood, as well as 12 murals carved into the wood. There was a moat around the building, with Philippine fish. The pavilion included a 500-seat theater, exhibit space, and a souvenir shop.	
Polynesia	International	Abel Sorensen and Peter Blake	A pair of Polynesian longhouses with dance performances, a restaurant, and craft shop. There was also a lagoon where "natives" collected oysters from canoes.	
Republic of China	International	C. C. Yang and Paul K. Y. Chen & Associates	A four-story building with red-and-gold decorations made in Taiwan. Inside were an exhibit hall and gift shop at ground level; meeting rooms on the second story; and exhibit space on the third story.	
Republic of Korea	International	Kim Chung-up and Walter Dorwin Teague Associates	A concrete structure with a tea house, dance performances, and a store. Outside was a 20-foot-tall (6.1 m) miniature Tabo Pagoda.	
Sierra Leone / United Nations	International	J. R. Jarrett-Yasker and Costas Machlouzarides	A structure with glass walls and a roof consisting of three cones. During the 1964 season, the structure included photographs, stage performances, and exhibits about African wood and Sierra Leonean products. In 1965, it became a United Nations pavilion with a restaurant.	
Spain	International	Francisco Javier Carvajal Ferrer and Kelly & Gruzen	A two-story structure with two interlocking rectangular shapes surrounding a large interior courtyard. Inside were three galleries exhibiting Spanish art, as well as furniture, graphic arts displays, and flamenco performances. Included was a dining room sponsored by American Express.	
Sudan	International	Noel & Miller	A domed building with a tropical garden and a snack bar. The first floor had a 1,000-year-old fresco and exhibits of artifacts, crafts, and industrial objects. The second floor had more artifacts from Sudanese nomads and tribes.	
Sweden	International	Backstrom & Reinius and John L. O'Brien Jr. (architects); Sigvard Bernadotte (designer)	A building with industrial exhibits, a Nordiska Kompaniet department store, and a restaurant.	
Switzerland	International	Guex, Kirchoff & De Freudenreich and John L. O'Brien Jr.	A series of replica chalets with a restaurant, information booth, clock exhibit, and displays of Swiss products such as watches.	
Thailand	International	Gasehm Suwongsa	A wooden replica of the mondop, or shrine, in the Thai city of Saraburi. The mondop included an exhibit about cultural traditions, art, and crafts in Thailand. There was also an adjoining structure with a restaurant and store.	
United Arab Republic	International	Ismail Nazif and Thomas V. DiCarlo	An angular, glass-and-concrete structure with three arches at its entrance. Inside were Egyptian artifacts, exhibits on various aspects of the United Arab Republic's history and culture, a shop, and a food-tasting center.	
Venezuela	International	Oscar Gonzales, Edmundo Diquez, and Stephen Leigh & Associates	A redwood structure with displays on Venezuelan art, history, and commerce, in addition to music and dance performances. The pavilion was expanded with a replica of Angel Falls in 1965.	
West Berlin	International	Ludwig Thurmer and Ira Kessler & Associates	A structure with a concrete wall surrounding a dome, a reference to the Berlin Wall. The pavilion included an exhibit from a single German company.	

== Industry pavilions ==
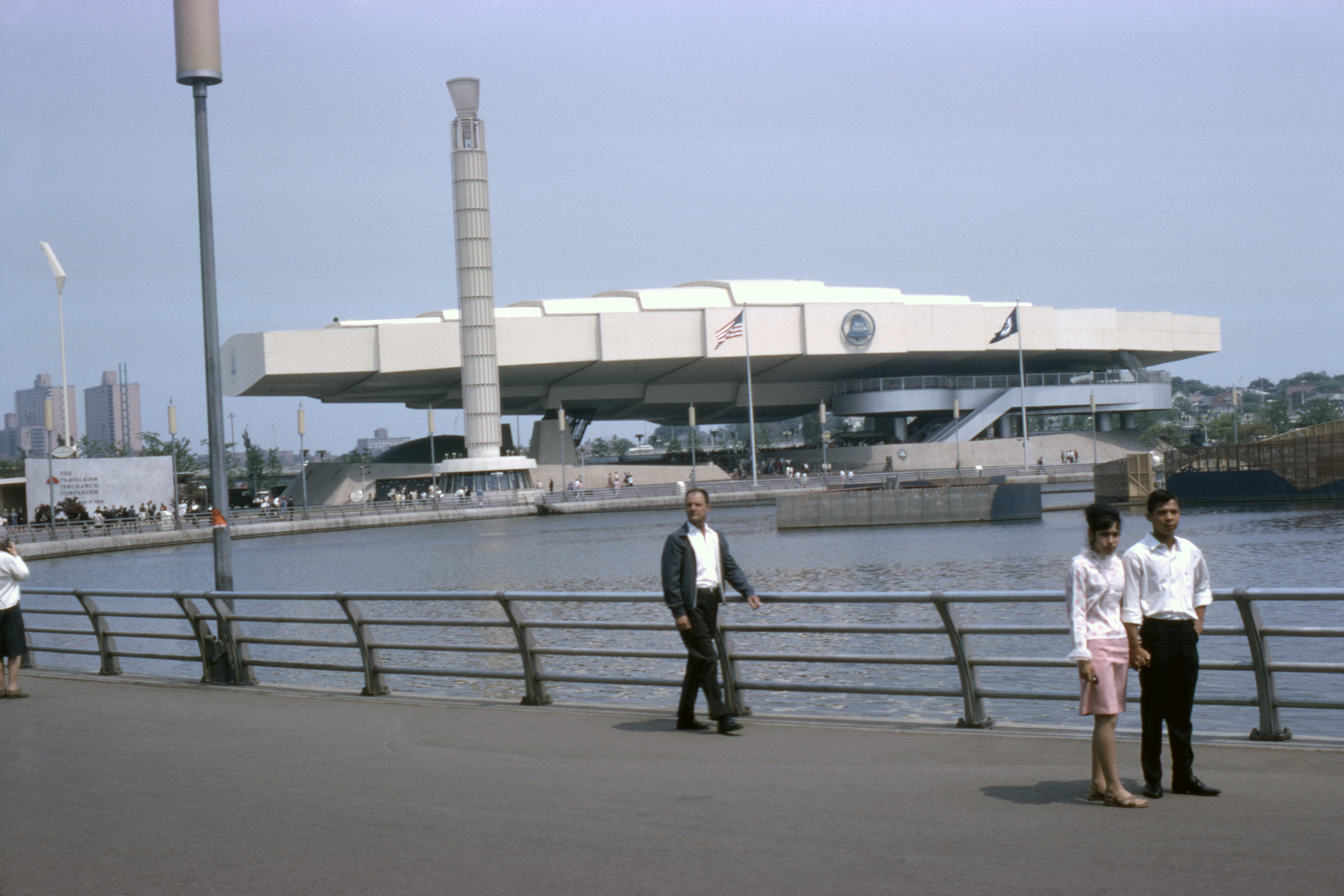
The Bell System Pavilion

The Industrial Area had 43 pavilions in total, representing nearly 350 American companies. Large firms such as Bell Telephone Company, DuPont, IBM, Kodak, RCA, The Travelers Companies, and US Royal Tires, participated. Many of these companies had also participated in the 1939 World's Fair. The 1964 fair included few companies in the food, chemical, tobacco, cosmetic, or pharmaceutical industries. Corporations also rented land from the WFC, except for religious organizations, which were given the land for free.

In general, most of the companies shared space in one of several multi-exhibit buildings, though about three dozen companies had their own pavilions. The fair included several interior-design and domestic-architecture exhibits, including at least six houses and 29 kitchen displays. Several of the industry pavilions offered free merchandise to visitors, which often succeeded in attracting customers. In addition, numerous buildings such as the Tower of Light and Ford pavilions had executive lounges.

Notable pavilions
Pavilion	Section	Architects	Description	Refs.
All-State Properties and Macy's / USO Lounge	Industrial	Stanley H. Klein (architect); Raymond Loewy & William Snaith (designers)	A pair of small houses. In 1964, the buildings were open to the public as show houses; in 1965, they were closed and converted into a lounge for United Service Organizations.	
American Express	Industrial	Kelly & Gruzen	A structure with a model of the fairground, as well as American Express financial services like check-cashing. Outside was a "money tree" with $1 million in U.S. dollars and foreign currency.	
American Interiors	Industrial	Thomas H. Yardley (architect); John Vassos (designer)	A four-story glass-and-steel structure composed of three interlocking cylindrical shapes. Inside were products from 120 interior design companies, as well as exhibits about seats, craftsmanship, and residential space. The structure had 14 rooms, each with design features from a different U.S. state.	
Bell System	Industrial	Harrison & Abramovitz (architect); Henry Dreyfuss (designer)	A 400-foot-long (120 m) structure that resembled a floating wing, with fiberglass facade panels. Inside was a communications-history ride with moving chairs, as well as a technological exhibit sponsored by Bell System. A digital sign showed the number of telephones in Bell's network. Nearby was a 130-foot-tall (40 m) transmission tower.	
Better Living Center	Industrial	John Lo Pinto & Associates	A seven-story building, with 250 exhibits about fashion, food, health, home, leisure, and security. The center included a women's lounge in its penthouse.	
Chunky Candy	Industrial	—N/a	A glass-walled factory where visitors could watch Chunky candy bars being manufactured. Adjacent to it was the Sculpture Continuum Playground, with 13 sculptures designed by Oliver O'Connor Barrett.	
Clairol	Industrial	Robinson-Capsis-Stern Associates	A pavilion sponsored by Clairol, with a turntable where women could have their hair color analyzed. Only women were allowed into the pavilion.	
Coca-Cola Company	Industrial	Welton Becket & Associates	A 120-foot (37 m) tower for the Coca-Cola Company with a 610-bell carillon. Inside the tower, visitors could communicate with amateur radio operators globally.	
Continental Insurance	Industrial	—N/a	A box-shaped structure with a projection screen on its facade (which displayed a film about U.S. history) and dioramas and art exhibits inside.	
Du Pont	Industrial	Voorhees, Walker, Smith, Smith & Haines	A structure sponsored by DuPont, with three screens in two theaters that displayed chemistry-related shows.	
Dynamic Maturity	Industrial	Ira Kessler & Associates	A pavilion where the AARP presented exhibits about retirement. The pavilion offered free pictures to visitors.	
Eastman Kodak	Industrial	Kahn & Jacobs	An undulating concrete structure with an undulating roof. Next to it was an 80-foot (24 m) tower, with five photographs each measuring 30 by 36 feet (9.1 by 11.0 m) across. Inside was an exhibit of photographs, a Q&A display, and a screening of the film The Searching Eye, along with camera-repair and photography services. There was also a play area on the roof.	
Equitable Life	Industrial	SOM (architects); Douglas Leigh (designer)	A series of exhibits, including a map showing U.S. demographics and a sign displaying the estimated U.S. population.	
Festival of Gas	Industrial	Walter Dorwin Teague Associates	A structure cantilevered from two large columns and surrounded by a moat. Inside were a restaurant, theater, and gas industry exhibits. In addition, there was a "total energy plant" which demonstrated how natural gas could heat, cool, and power the building.	
First National City Bank	Industrial	—N/a	A pair of buildings for First National City Bank, both with functional bank branches. One structure was for visitors and included a globe and flagpoles outside. The other structure was for fair employees.	
Formica	Industrial	Emil A. Schmidlin	A seven-room, one-story house on a hill. The house's walls were made with laminated plastic, and it was illuminated by a skylight. There was a raffle in which visitors could receive the chance to have a replica of the house built for themselves.	
General Cigar	Industrial	FABRAP	A "hall of magic" sponsored by the General Cigar Company.	
General Electric	Industrial	Welton Becket & Associates (architect); WED Enterprises (designer)	A dome with steel tubing and over 2,000 colored lights on the roof. It included the Carousel of Progress, a rotating auditorium that showed scenes from the 1880s, 1920s, 1940s, and 1960s.	
House of Good Taste	Industrial	Edward Durell Stone, Jack Pickens Coble, and Royal Barry Wills	A set of three homes, each of different architectural styles. There was a traditional 3-bedroom clapboard house, a contemporary house with a summer-house and three pools, and a modern house surrounding a central garden. The houses were built exclusively using materials that were sold widely in the U.S.	
IBM	Industrial	Eero Saarinen & Associates (architects); Charles Eames (designer)	An elliptical structure with 45 tree-shaped columns supporting a roof with 14,000 glass panels. Underneath the roof were movable seats that could rise from ground level into a theater, ascending a total of 53 feet (16 m).	
Johnson's Wax	Industrial	Lippincott & Margulies	A structure with a large canopy, underneath which was a ground-level exhibit space with an information center and a short film. A free shoe-shine service for men was also provided.	
Julimar Farm	Industrial	Edward Durell Stone	A pavilion with a small garden, some miniature horses, and a shop for Julimar Farms products.	
Mastro Pizza	Industrial	—N/a	A quick-service restaurant.	
Medo Photo Supply	Industrial	—N/a	A camera shop, which sold camera film, slides, movies, and cameras, in addition to assisting visitors with photography-related queries.	
National Cash Register	Industrial	Deeter & Ritchey	A two-story building that displayed devices such as computers and abacuses. There was a game room where visitors could use multiple types of machines.	
Pan American Highway Gardens	Industrial	—N/a	An attraction sponsored by the World's Fair Corporation. During the 1964 season, there was a tropical garden, and during the 1965 season, the garden was replaced by a go-kart track.	
Parker Pen	Industrial	Flad Architects	An open-air structure with 90 writing desks, where people could write to pen pals around the world. There was also an exhibit of Parker Pen history and products.	
Pepsi-Cola	Industrial	WED Enterprises	A pair of exhibit structures. The larger structure contained the It's a Small World boat ride, with depictions of five faraway locations where people could buy Pepsi-Cola. The smaller structure was a store for UNICEF. Outside was Rolly Crump's 12-story Tower of the Four Winds, an openwork structure made of aluminum.	
RCA	Industrial	Malcolm Wells	A series of drum-shaped structures with an RCA television studio and numerous exhibits.	
Rheingold	Industrial	Kahn & Jacobs	A replica of an old New York cobblestone street with Georgian-style buildings, which contained shops and restaurants. There was a cafe and a quick-service restaurant called the Rheingold Restaurant, as well as a table service restaurant called the Town House Restaurant.	
Schaefer	Industrial	Eggers & Higgins (architects); Walter Dorwin Teague Associates (designer)	An exhibit about Schaefer Beer, along with a restaurant, a 300-person-capacity beer garden, and a curved bar area. Schaefer's exhibit was split across three plastic-and-fiberglass structures, with roofs that stood atop tapering steel columns.	
Scott Paper	Industrial	Anthony R. Moody (architect); Donald Deskey (designer)	A set of four structures. The main building contained a dark ride through an "enchanted forest", which displayed the history of paper. There was also a building with a lounge and diaper changing rooms; an office on stilts; and a 50-foot (15 m) tower.	
Seven Up	Industrial	Becker & Becker & Associates	A cafe serving sandwiches and 7 Up drinks, adjacent to a 107-foot (33 m) clock tower.	
Simmons	Industrial	A. Epstein & Sons	A structure with sleep-related exhibits on the first floor and beds above. Visitors could take a nap in one of 46 beds. Six furnished multipurpose rooms were added for the 1965 season.	
Singer Bowl	Industrial	Architectural Enterprises Inc.	A multipurpose stadium, with an exhibit by the Singer Corporation underneath the grandstands.	
Tower of Light	Industrial	Synergetics Inc. (architect); Kenneth Snelson (sculptor)	A structure with rectangular aluminum prisms in a rainbow color palette. At night, the tower was illuminated by a beam that was capable of 12 billion candlepower.	
Travelers Insurance	Industrial	Kahn & Jacobs (architects); Donald Deskey (designer)	A structure resembling two interlocking umbrella shapes, one of which was painted bright red. The shapes were suspended from cables. The pavilion included a mural about the early history of Earth and dioramas about early humankind.	
Underground World Home	Transportation	Billy J. Cox	An underground model of a home and bomb shelter, based on a 10-room underground house designed by Jay Swayze in Texas. This was the deepest exhibit at the fair, at 15 feet (4.6 m) below ground.	
Westinghouse	Federal and State	Eliot Noyes & Associates	Consisted of three disc-shaped pavilions. A Westinghouse time capsule was buried near the New York State Pavilion, adjacent to another capsule buried during the 1939 fair.	

== Transportation pavilions ==
Transportation companies, such as car manufacturers Chrysler, Ford, and General Motors, displayed products in the Transportation Area section of the fairground.

Notable pavilions
Pavilion	Section	Architects	Description	Refs.
Avis Antique Car Ride	Transportation	—N/a	A ride sponsored by Avis Car Rental, with 5/8-scale models of antique cars traveling along a loop.	
Chrysler	Transportation	George Nelson & Co.	A group of five "islands" in a lagoon, each of which showcased a different aspect of Chrysler. The islands contained four connected buildings with seating for 2,500 visitors. There was also a large model rocket.	
Eastern Air Lines	Transportation	—N/a	An airline ticket office and bus terminal, with a mural of a map of Eastern Air Lines destinations.	
Ford	Transportation	Welton Becket & Associates (architect); WED Enterprises (designer)	A 235-foot-wide (72 m) rotunda with pylons, and an attached exhibit building for Ford Motor Company products. It included the Magic Skyway, a transport ride designed by The Walt Disney Company with Ford Mustang convertibles. There was also an international garden for foreign cars. A third entrance, allowing people to view the exhibit without going on the ride, was added in 1965.	
General Motors	Transportation	Sol King and Albert Kahn (architects); GM staff (designers)	A domed structure with a reflecting pool and a 10-story entrance canopy. The building was 680 feet (210 m) long by 200 feet (61 m) wide. Inside was a replica of the 1939 fair's Futurama exhibit, in which visitors sat on armchairs that passed through a depiction of the future. There was also a plaza where General Motors cars were displayed.	
Greyhound	Transportation	—N/a	A structure with three restaurants and several films and slideshows about Greyhound Lines, in addition to vehicles.	
Hertz	Transportation	—N/a	A travel center for Hertz Global Holdings, with strollers for rent.	
Long Island Rail Road	Federal and State	Daniel Chait	Included two tents, one with a model railroad and another with memorabilia from across Long Island. There was also a windmill, a miniature train ride, and a replica of a signal tower overlooking a real LIRR line (the Port Washington Branch).	
National Maritime Union Park	Transportation	—N/a	An elliptical park sponsored by the National Maritime Union with pools, benches, and a concert area. It was the fair's only exhibit that was sponsored by a labor union.	
Port Authority	Transportation	Port Authority of New York and New Jersey	A heliport building for the Port Authority of New York and New Jersey, supported on four stilts. Inside was a two-level space with a 1,100-seat restaurant and a 360-degree movie theater. There was also a model of the Port Authority's proposed World Trade Center, including its twin towers.	
Sinclair	Transportation	J. Gordon Carr	An outdoors display with nine fiberglass dinosaurs, an allusion to the Sinclair Oil Corporation's logo.	
SKF	Transportation	Pisani & Carlos	A 82-foot-tall (25 m) needle-shaped pavilion where SKF gave out ball bearings.	
Socony-Mobil	Transportation	Peter Schladermundt Associates	A structure sponsored by Socony-Mobil, with simulators where people could test out their cross-country driving skills while using as little fuel as possible. Up to 36 people competed against each other.	
Space Park	Transportation	—N/a	Displays of real spacecraft loaned by NASA, as well as mockups of spacecraft and unbuilt vehicles.	
Transportation and Travel	Transportation	Clive Entwhistle Associates	A structure with exhibits about the United States Armed Forces, travel companies, steamships, airlines, railroads, and trucking firms. Trans World Airlines, the pavilion's official airline, had exhibits on three floors. The roof was shaped like a half-moon dome.	
U.S. Rubber	Transportation	Shreve, Lamb & Harmon	A Ferris wheel shaped like a U.S. Rubber tire. The wheel measured 80 feet (24 m) high and 24 four-seat cabins.	

== Religious pavilions ==
Robert Moses also provided about 7 acres (2.8 ha) for religious groups at the fairground, and he invited every major sect of Christianity to the fair. Eight religious pavilions were built: the Billy Graham, Christian Science, Mormon, Protestant and Orthodox, Russian Orthodox, Sermons from Science, Two Thousand Tribes, and Vatican pavilions. The Protestant and Orthodox pavilion was the only religious pavilion to house more than one sect. Each religious pavilion was staffed by volunteers. A proposed Jewish pavilion was canceled and replaced by the American-Israel Pavilion, and a unified Temple of Religion for Protestants, Catholics, and Jews was also rejected.

Notable pavilions
Pavilion	Section	Architects	Description	Refs.
Billy Graham	International	Edward Durell Stone	An octagonal structure about the teachings of the evangelist Billy Graham, with a theater, gallery space, chapel, counseling spaces, and lounge. A garden surrounded the building. Inside, a film was screened in six languages.	
Christian Science	International	—N/a	A structure shaped like a seven-pointed star, with a seven-sided pyramidal roof. Inside was a display about the Christian Science movement. There was also a separate reading room.	
Mormon Church	Industrial	Fordyce & Hamby	A replica of the Salt Lake Temple, the largest LDS Church temple, topped by a sculpture of an Angel Moroni. Inside were twin exhibit spaces describing the LDS Church's activities and history.	
Protestant and Orthodox Center	Industrial	Henry W. Stone and Kempa & Schwartz Associates	A structure with a theater, chapel, and music garden. Outside the pavilion were 34 pillars bearing the names of Protestant pioneers. About 20 groups hosted exhibits in the building.	
Russian Orthodox Church	Industrial	—N/a	A replica of a Russian Orthodox Church chapel in Fort Ross, California.	
Sermons From Science	International	—N/a	A circular structure with a 500-seat theater. Scientific demonstrations took place alongside religious sermons.	
Two Thousand Tribes	International	—N/a	A replica of an indigenous people's hut with totem poles, sponsored by Wycliffe Bible Translators. Inside, linguists translated the Bible into numerous languages.	
Vatican City	International	York & Sawyer; Hurley & Hughes; Luders & Associates	An elliptical structure with a tent-like pinnacle, an exhibition space, and an upstairs chapel. The pavilion included Michelangelo's sculpture Pietà and a replica of Saint Peter's tomb. There was also a 350-person chapel that accommodated over 1,200 masses in 1964 alone. The Vatican pavilion was the only attraction with a caretaker that lived there full-time.	

== Other pavilions ==
Other pavilions included:

Notable pavilions
Pavilion	Section	Architects	Description	Refs.
Garden of Meditation	International	—N/a	A 2-acre (0.81 ha) park with trees, in addition to a teardrop-shaped pool.	
Hall of Education / Demonstration Center	Industrial	Frederic P. Wiedersum Associates	For the 1964 season, the pavilion included an auditorium, classrooms, laboratories, libraries, and other educational exhibits. In 1965, it became the Demonstration Center. The building was decorated with a mural by Walter Keane.	
Hall of Free Enterprise	International	Ira Kessler & Associates	A structure with a theater and lectures.	
Hall of Science	Transportation	Harrison & Abramovitz	A permanent museum building with a curving concrete facade and a spiraling exhibition space inside. There were various science and health-related exhibits, including three space vehicles. Science experiments took place there during 1965.	
Masonic Center	International	—N/a	An exhibit showcasing various Masonic artifacts.	
Pavilion of Fine Art / Bargreen Buffet	International	—N/a	A structure adapted from the unopened Argentine pavilion. In 1964, it was the Fine Arts pavilion, which displayed 250 contemporary artists' work. In 1965, it was the Bargreen Buffet restaurant.	
U.S. Post Office	Industrial	—N/a	A display of mail-sorting machines used by the Post Office. Outside was a walkway flanked by mailboxes.	
World's Fair / Winston Churchill	Industrial	Eggers & Higgins	A 175-foot-wide (53 m) geodesic dome. For the 1964 season, it was used as a multipurpose sports center, and in 1965, it became a memorial to former British prime minister Winston Churchill. The Churchill memorial included numerous artifacts from Churchill's life and was sponsored by the nonprofit organization People to People.	
World's Fair Marina	Outside the fairground	—N/a	An 865-slip marina with a mail-delivery center, an information booth about boating facilities, and a yacht display. There was also a coffee shop and restaurant.	

== Unbuilt and unopened pavilions ==
The World's Fair originally was supposed to contain a five-story World of Food pavilion, which was dismantled shortly before the fair opened. WFC officials wanted the World of Food pavilion demolished because it was located near the fair's main entrance and would not be completed in time for the fair's opening. The American Indian pavilion, which would have contained five structures, was never completed. The Argentine pavilion was completed but was never used as such. At the western end of the fairground, land had been reserved for an "aerospace island". The WFC had also considered a pavilion for fashion firms, though fashion shows were ultimately split between the New York State Pavilion and Better Living Center. Other pavilions were canceled by the WFC, including an art pavilion and an exhibit for the People's Republic of China. Some foreign exhibitors were rejected in late 1963 because there was not enough time to develop their pavilions.

The Soviet Union (along with its 15 Soviet republics) and Israel were supposed to have operated exhibits as well. The Soviet Union withdrew after a spat regarding the United States' participation in two Soviet world's fairs, and it refused to join for the 1965 season. Israel withdrew after its government decided to reallocate funds away from the planned Israeli pavilion. Several BIE members, including Canada, France, and the Netherlands, canceled plans for official pavilions at the 1964 fair after the BIE approved Expo 67 in Montreal, Quebec. A privately sponsored French pavilion, which was supposed to have contained three structures, was partially built and then canceled. Puerto Rico also canceled its planned pavilion due to a lack of money. Some of these nonexistent exhibits were displayed on official maps, causing confusion among visitors.

== Remaining pavilions ==
After the fair, most pavilions were demolished, while some pavilions remained in Flushing Meadows–Corona Park or were moved elsewhere. Several exhibitors chose to sell off their buildings due to the high cost of demolition, including U.S. Steel and Thailand. In other cases, exhibitors sold off the contents of their pavilions, or people offered to salvage specific parts of pavilions.

=== Structures at Flushing Meadows–Corona Park ===
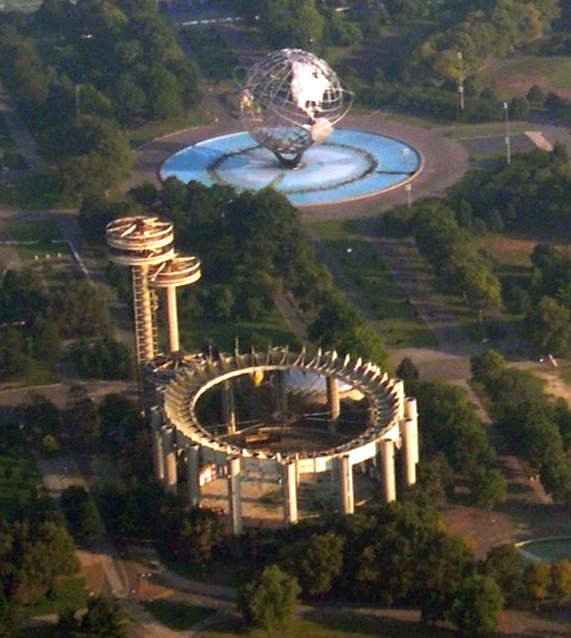
Aerial view of some remaining structures in Flushing Meadows in 2004, including the New York State Pavilion in the foreground and the Unisphere in the background

The New York Daily News wrote in 2012 that the remaining structures from the fair "have provided Flushing Meadows–Corona Park with some of its most striking structures". Preserved at the center of the park is the Unisphere, which is a New York City designated landmark. Near the Unisphere is the New York City Pavilion, which hosts the Queens Museum and continues to display Panorama of the City of New York, an exhibit created for the 1964 fair. Also nearby is the New York State Pavilion, which is largely unused as of 2024; the State Pavilion's former Theaterama is used by the Queens Theatre in the Park. The U.S. Post Office pavilion became a skating rink, then a warehouse.

In the northwestern part of the park, the New York Hall of Science was preserved as a museum and was expanded in 2004. The Hall of Science includes two rockets from the fair's Space Park. The Port Authority pavilion became the Terrace on the Park banquet hall. The Winston Churchill Tribute became the aviary for the neighboring Queens Zoo, which opened in 1968. Near the zoo is the Flushing Meadows Carousel. The World's Fair Marina, built for the 1939 fair and expanded for the 1964 fair, still operates along Flushing Bay. The fair's Press Building became a New York City Police Department (NYPD) facility, and the Greyhound Building became a New York City Fire Department facility. In addition, the New York City Department of Parks and Recreation (NYC Parks) took over several other structures. NYC Parks and the NYPD jointly took over the fair's main entrance building at the northern end of the site; the structure, known as the Passerelle Building, also includes a ramp to the New York City Subway's Willets Point station.

Several monuments remain on the sites of former pavilions. The Column of Jerash, an ancient column of Jordan, stands on the site of the Jordan pavilion near the Unisphere, while a stone bench marking the site of the Vatican pavilion stands east of the main fountain. A plaque marks the site of the Garden of Meditation.

Other buildings remained for several years before being demolished. The Travel and Transportation Pavilion was destroyed in 1967 after a failed conversion to a fire station, and the United States Pavilion was demolished in 1977 after extensive deterioration. The Aquacade amphitheater, originally built for the 1939 fair, also decayed extensively and was ultimately demolished in 1996. The Singer Bowl became a sports venue. The Louis Armstrong Stadium replaced half of the Singer Bowl in 1977, while the remainder of the venue was preserved as a grandstand, which was razed in 2016.

=== Structures relocated ===
Other structures were relocated at the end of the fair. Several international pavilions remained near New York City. Denmark's pavilion became a mall in Westport, Connecticut; India's pavilion became an office building in Clifton, New Jersey; and Japan's pavilion went to Manhattanville College. Further away, Austria's pavilion became a ski lodge in western New York; Malaysia's pavilion was donated to the University of Plano; the Paris pavilion became a bowling alley in East Stroudsburg, Pennsylvania; Spain's pavilion was relocated to a hotel in St. Louis, Missouri; and Switzerland's pavilion became a ski lodge in New Hampshire. The Thailand pavilion was rebuilt at Expo 67 in Montreal, the only structure from the 1964 fair that was reused as a world's fair pavilion. The West Berlin pavilion was acquired by a college in Woodridge, New York.

In the state area, part of the Wisconsin Pavilion became a radio station in Neillsville, Wisconsin, while another part of the Wisconsin Pavilion was relocated to Pennsylvania and used as a ski lodge. The New England pavilion was moved to a mall in South Portland, Maine, where it was repurposed as a hotel building. Of the religious exhibits, the Christian Science pavilion was moved to Poway, California, while the Mormon pavilion became an meetinghouse in Plainville, New York. The US Royal Ferris wheel became the Uniroyal Giant Tire in Allen Park, Michigan, while the Johnson Wax pavilion became the Golden Rondelle Theater in Racine, Wisconsin. In addition, the Parker Pen pavilion became an administrative building in Missouri. One of the three structures near the World's Fair Marina became a cabin in upstate New York. Other structures, such as the Steaktown USA restaurant, Identity building, and South precinct building, were also acquired by organizations based in New York.

=== Structures partially preserved ===
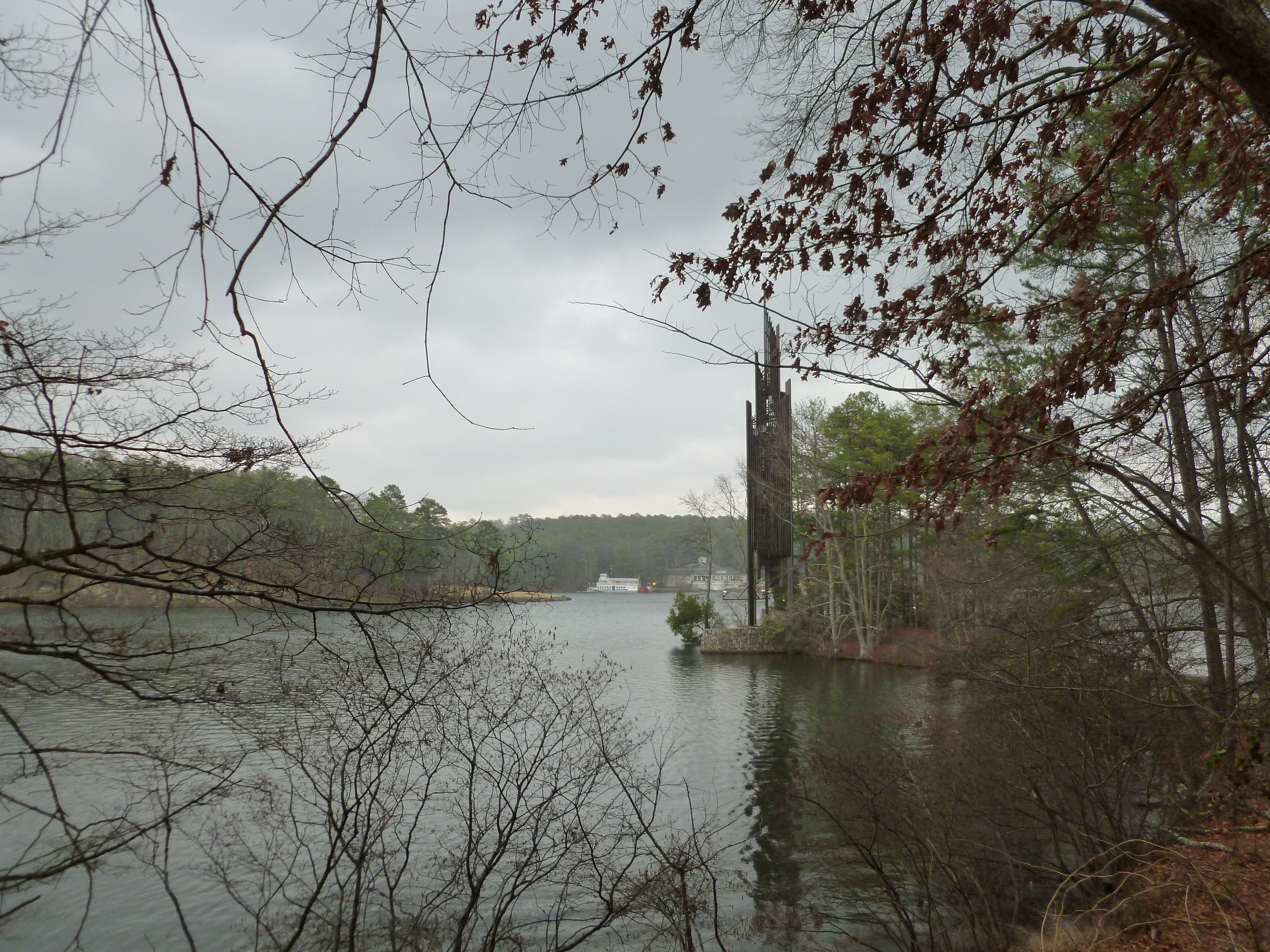
The Coca-Coca Pavilion's carillon was moved to Stone Mountain in Georgia.

In some cases, only part of a pavilion was preserved due to the high cost of preserving the full pavilion. Part of the Vatican pavilion was moved to Saint Mary Mother of the Redeemer Church in Groton, Connecticut, the Coca-Cola pavilion's carillon was moved to Stone Mountain near Atlanta, Georgia. Arches from the General Foods pavilion were sent to Warwick, Rhode Island; Huntsville, Ohio; and West Hempstead, New York. The Roman Catholic Archdiocese of New York acquired the fair's color televisions, while the fair's cubical lampposts were moved to Penn Hills Resort in the Poconos. The Railroad Museum of Long Island in Riverhead, New York, received the LIRR pavilion's miniature railway, and other Long Island businesses also received objects from the LIRR pavilion. The footprints from the Hollywood pavilion were moved to the Angel Stadium in Anaheim, California.

Several rides and museum exhibits were preserved. The IBM pavilion's Mathematica: A World of Numbers... and Beyond exhibit is at the Henry Ford Museum of American Innovation in Dearborn, Michigan, while Travelers Insurance sent its Triumph of Man exhibit to the COSI museum in Columbus, Ohio. The GE pavilion's Progressland carousel was first moved to Disneyland in Anaheim, California, then to the Magic Kingdom theme park at Walt Disney World in Bay Lake, Florida, where it became the Carousel of Progress. The It's a Small World ride was shipped to Disneyland in Anaheim, and the Swiss Sky Ride was moved to Six Flags Great Adventure in Jackson Township, New Jersey. The Belgian Village carousel became Le Galopant at La Ronde in Montreal, Quebec, though the ride no longer operates as of 2023. The fair's log flume became a ride at Pirates World in Florida.

Some pavilions also became traveling exhibitions, such as Clairol's "color carousel" and Sinclair Oil's dinosaur exhibits; the dinosaurs were ultimately scattered across the United States. Construction material was also salvaged. Walls from the Mormon, Socony Mobil, and Ireland pavilions were reused in buildings in New York and Pennsylvania, and one man in Glen Cove, New York, built his house using materials from multiple pavilions. A seaplane terminal in the Bronx salvaged parts of the fair's monorail, Poupées des Paris, and wax museum, while Texas oil magnate John Mecom Sr. bought the rest of the monorail.

== Reception ==
There was commentary on the pavilions' conflicting architectural styles. Ada Louise Huxtable of The New York Times wrote that the fair was architecturally "grotesque", while other critics lambasted the structures as befitting Coney Island or a street fair. The critic Vincent Scully Jr. derided the fair in a Life magazine article, "If This Is Architecture, God Help Us". Conversely, Time magazine wrote in June 1964 that the fair had "grace and substance" despite the presence of some "tacky" attractions, a sentiment repeated in The Atlanta Journal-Constitution. The American Institute of Architects gave awards to several pavilions for "excellence in design". A Newsday reporter described the fair as "both garish and subtle, tawdry and tasteful, ephemeral and lasting". After the fair closed, architectural critic Wolf Von Eckardt lambasted the fair as "a frightening image of ourselves" because of its "chaotic" architecture.

== See also ==
- List of World's Fair architecture
- 1939 New York World's Fair pavilions and attractions
