= WOSQ =

- Spencer, Wisconsin; United States
- Frequency: 92.3 MHz
- Branding: SportsRadio 92.3

Programming
- Format: Sports
- Affiliations: Westwood One; ABC News Radio; ESPN Radio

Ownership
- Owner: Kevin Grap; (Central Wisconsin Broadcasting, Inc.)
- Sister stations: WDLB, WPKG, WCCN-FM, WCCN (AM)

History
- First air date: 1985 (as WMJA)
- Former call signs: WMJA (1984–1990); WOSX (1990–1994)

Technical information
- Licensing authority: FCC
- Facility ID: 24445
- Class: A
- ERP: 6,000 watts
- HAAT: 91 meters (299 ft)
- Transmitter coordinates: 44°48′32.00″N 90°21′41.00″W

Links
- Public license information: Public file; LMS
- Webcast: Listen live
- Website: www.wosqfm.com

WOSQ (92.3 FM) is a radio station broadcasting a sports format. Licensed to Spencer, Wisconsin, United States, the station is currently owned by Kevin Grap, through licensee Central Wisconsin Broadcasting, Inc., and features programming from Westwood One, ABC News Radio, Learfield, and ESPN Radio, and various local programs.

== History ==
The station was assigned the call sign WMJA on August 2, 1984. On February 2, 1990, the station changed its call sign to WOSX, then changed on June 1, 1994, to the current WOSQ.
