= Uniroyal Giant Tire =

Roadside attraction in Allen Park, Michigan

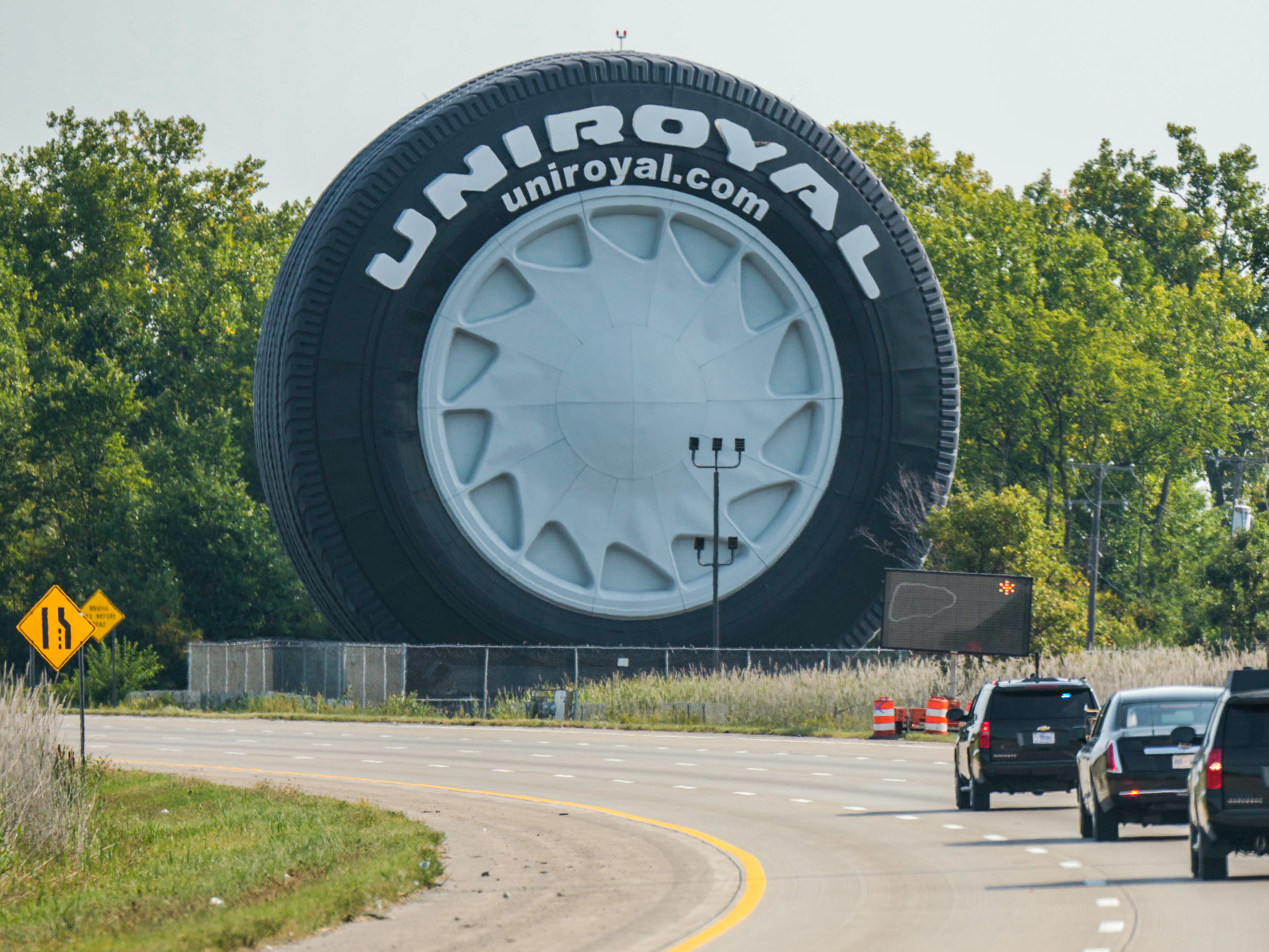
- President Joe Biden's motorcade passing the tire in 2022
- Interactive map of the Uniroyal Giant Tire area

General information
- Location: 1964–1965: New York World's Fair; 1966–present: Allen Park, Michigan
- Coordinates: 42.2705°N 83.2091°W

Design and construction
- Architect: Hardesty & Hanover

The Uniroyal Giant Tire was created by the United States Rubber Company for the 1964 New York World's Fair, where it functioned as a Ferris wheel. Since 1966 it has been a static display alongside Interstate 94 in Allen Park, Michigan, United States between the Southfield Freeway interchange and Outer Drive overpass.

== Dimensions ==
The tire has a diameter of 80 feet (24.4 m) and weighs 12 short tons (11 t), is anchored in 24 feet (7.3 m) of concrete and steel, and can withstand hurricane-force winds.

The exterior tire tread is 6 inches (15 cm) deep, with an interior volume of 120,576 cubic feet (3,414.3 m^{3}). It is not made of rubber, but of a Uniroyal-developed polyester resin reinforced with glass fiber, which makes it flame resistant. It is the largest non-production scale model of a tire ever built, and one of the world's largest roadside attractions.

== History ==
=== Construction and operation ===
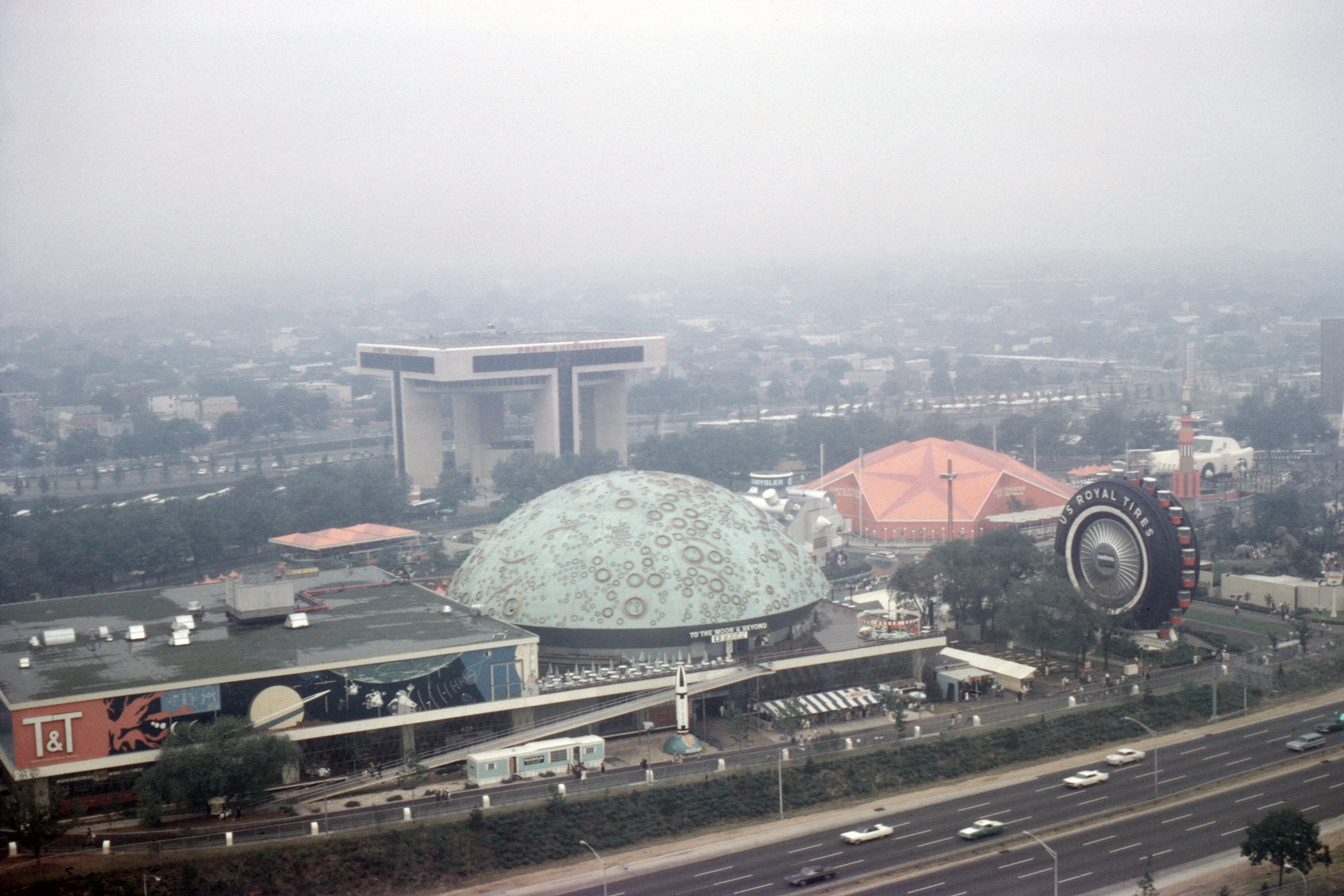
The Giant Tire in its initial Ferris wheel configuration at the World's Fair

The structure was designed by Hardesty & Hanover and Shreve, Lamb & Harmon as a Ferris wheel for the 1964 New York World's Fair in Flushing, Queens, New York. Built next to the Grand Central Parkway at a cost of $750,000, the Tire sat next to the Transportation and Travel Pavilion for both seasons of the fair. Rides initially cost 25¢, but the fare was doubled to 50¢ for the 1965 season. The structure is made of steel and fiberglass, and was originally emblazoned with "U S ROYAL TIRES" on its sides. It had 24 barrel-shaped gondolas, each carrying up to 4 people, and could carry up to 96 passengers at once. It was driven by a 100 hp engine and sat atop a 40 ft (12.2 m) foundation. During the fair, the wheel carried over 2 million people, including prominent passengers such as Jacqueline Kennedy, Telly Savalas, and the Shah of Iran.

=== Relocation ===
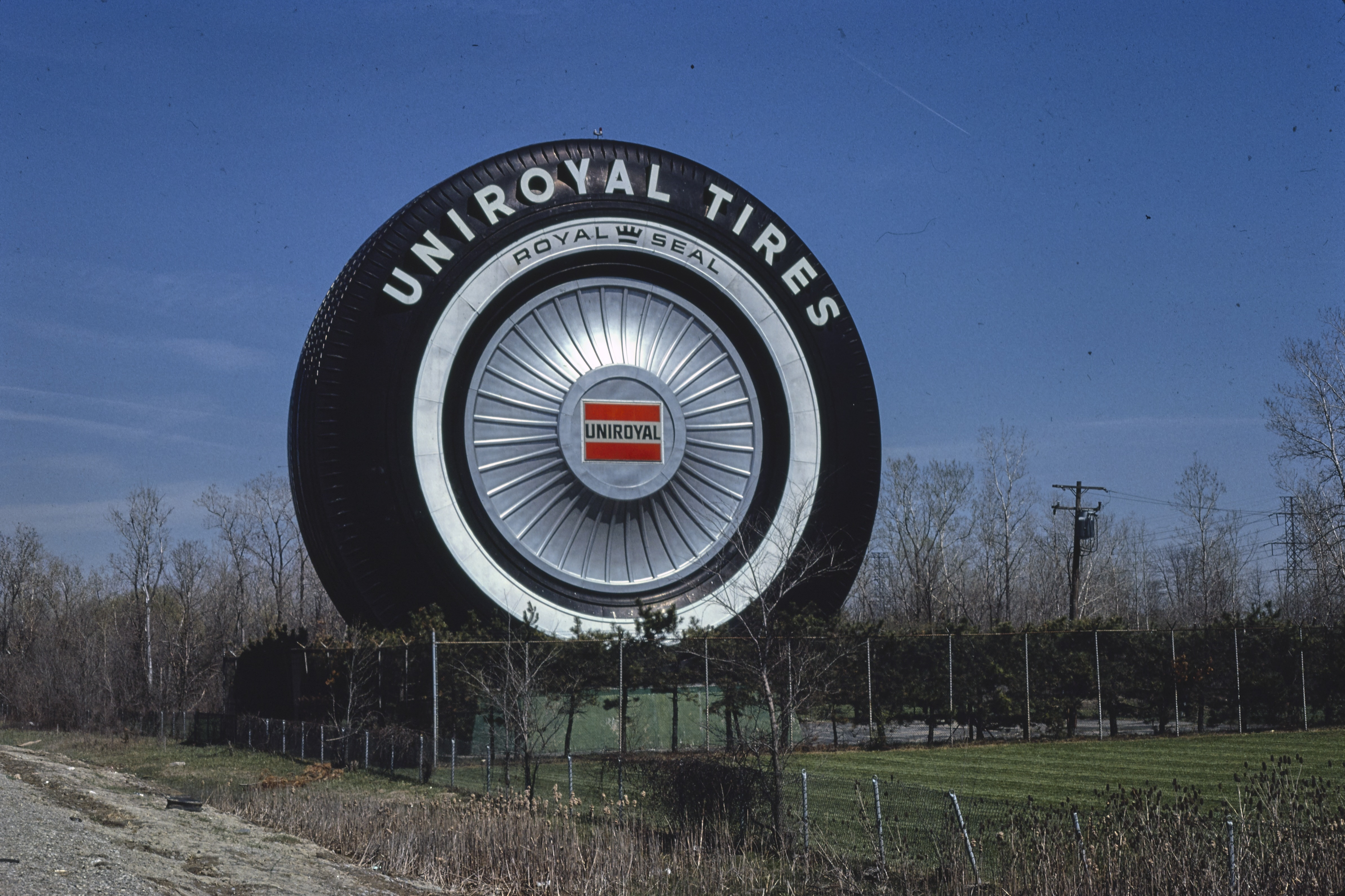
The Giant Tire in its current location in 1986

When the fair ended in 1965, US Rubber offered to donate the exhibit to the City of New York or any other entity who wanted it, citing moving costs of $300,000. In response, the Parks Commissioner and City Planning Chair were quoted as saying the Tire's "use as an integral amusement area is absolutely opposed by the Department of Parks. This type of amusement, commonly known as 'Kiddie Cities,' does not enhance a park." Later that year, the tire was eventually disassembled and shipped via 22 trucks to Allen Park (a suburb of Detroit), where it was reassembled without its passenger gondolas in 1966 as a static display outside US Rubber's Midwest corporate headquarters. Today it still stands tall as a symbol of Uniroyal's heritage and a Detroit landmark.

In 1968, the Tire's original location became the Flushing Meadow Zoo after a 2-year redevelopment led by Robert Moses.

On May 20, 2015, Uniroyal staged an event to celebrate the 50th anniversary of the tire for members of the Automotive Press Association and other guests, who toured its interior.

=== Renovations ===
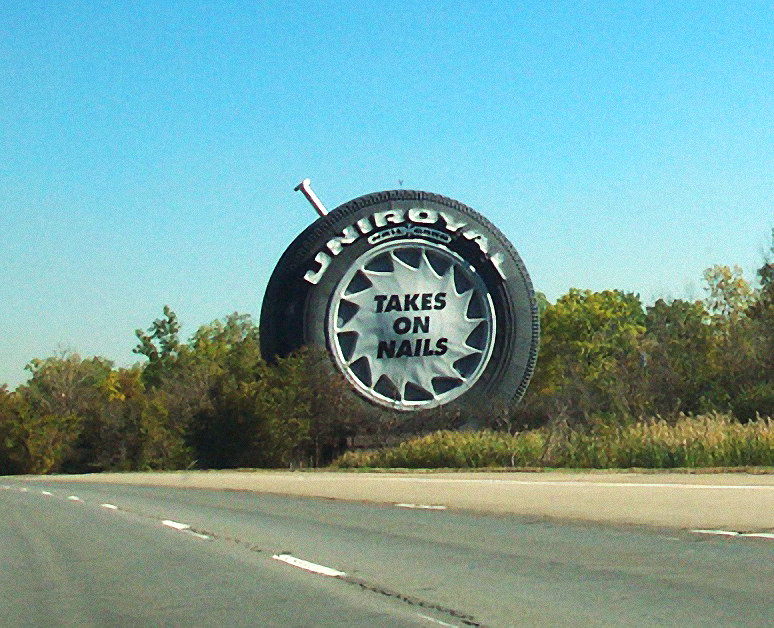
The tire with the nail in 2002

Michelin completed its purchase of the Uniroyal Goodrich Tire Company in 1990, and in 1994 announced plans to renovate the landmark, including a new hubcap and the addition of neon lights for the UNIROYAL lettering. The tire's fiberglass cover was cleaned, painted, and modernized with a new sleek look.

In 1998, a giant 11-foot (3.4 m) nail weighing 250 pounds (110 kg). was placed in its tread as a promotion for Uniroyal's new NailGard puncture resistant tire. The nail was removed in 2003 and was donated to the city of Allen Park, to be auctioned on eBay to raise funds for the Allen Park Historical Society programs and facilities.

In 2003, the Giant Tire was renovated as part of Detroit's I-94 corridor revitalization project. The US$1,000,000 work included the replacement of 30 interior steel beams, asphalt and storm drain installation, and the replacement of the neon lettering with reflective lettering.

== See also ==
- 1964 New York World's Fair pavilions
