= WDLB =

- Marshfield, Wisconsin; United States
- Broadcast area: Wausau-Stevens Point
- Frequency: 1450 kHz
- Branding: WDLB AM 1450 FM 98.7

Programming
- Format: Classic hits
- Affiliations: ABC News Radio

Ownership
- Owner: Kevin Grap; (Central Wisconsin Broadcasting, Inc.)
- Sister stations: WOSQ

History
- First air date: February 2, 1947
- Call sign meaning: DairyLand Broadcasting (original owner)

Technical information
- Licensing authority: FCC
- Facility ID: 24443
- Class: C
- Power: 750 watts day; 1,000 watts night
- Transmitter coordinates: 44°41′49.00″N 90°9′20.00″W
- Translator: 98.7 W254DL (Marshfield)

Links
- Public license information: Public file; LMS
- Webcast: Listen live
- Website: www.wdlbam.com

WDLB (1450 AM) is a radio station broadcasting a classic hits format. Licensed to Marshfield, Wisconsin, United States, the station serves the Wausau-Stevens Point area, and features programing from ABC News Radio.

== History ==
The station signed on February 2, 1947, and has broadcast from the same location at 1710 North Central Avenue since the beginning, initially with 250 watts, later increasing to 1 kW from a transmitter located in back of the building. The Call Letters stand for "Wisconsin's Dairy Land Broadcasting" for the original owners, serving the Marshfield community with News, Sports, and Local Information. In 1965, an FM sister station was added at 106.5 MHz. In 1976, an early morning farm program debuted, hosted by Farm Broadcaster Les Leonard, which later grew into a statewide broadcast known as "Daybreak". WDLB's music formats thru the years has varied, for many years, using "Block Programming", mostly MOR/Adult Contemporary during the day, an early evening Country music program, and Top 40 during nights and weekend hours. Owned by Goetz Broadcasting for many years, beginning in 1965. Previous owners included Clarkwood Broadcasting, the station was sold to Marathon Media in the late 1990s, then NRG Media in 2004, and then sold to Seehafer Broadcasting in June 2006, headed by Marshfield Native Don Seehafer, in a deal which also included WFHR, Wisconsin Rapids. The station currently features local programming during the morning and early afternoon hours, along with a syndicated Oldies format from Westwood One the rest of the day. WDLB has been an ABC radio affiliate since the late 1960s, originally carrying ABC Contemporary Radio programming and Paul Harvey News and Commentary.

Notable personalities that started their careers at WDLB, include former MTV executive Jeff Rowe, using the moniker "Dallas Cole" and National Voice Artist Scott Chapin, under the name "Todd Simon".

The station is currently owned by Kevin Grap, through licensee Central Wisconsin Broadcasting, Inc., which acquired WDLB, translator W254DL, and sister station WOSQ from Seehafer Broadcasting effective February 15, 2022, for $250,000.
