= WPKG =

- Neillsville, Wisconsin; United States
- Frequency: 92.7 MHz
- Branding: 92.7 FM wpkg

Programming
- Format: Hot adult contemporary
- Affiliations: Westwood One

Ownership
- Owner: Central Wisconsin Broadcasting, Inc.
- Sister stations: WCCN, WCCN-FM

History
- First air date: February 2004

Technical information
- Licensing authority: FCC
- Facility ID: 78330
- Class: A
- ERP: 3,400 watts
- HAAT: 134 meters (440 ft)
- Transmitter coordinates: 44°35′30.00″N 90°37′9.00″W

Links
- Public license information: Public file; LMS
- Webcast: Listen live
- Website: cwbradio.com

WPKG (92.7 FM, "Today's Best Hits") is a radio station broadcasting a hot adult contemporary music format. Licensed to Neillsville, Wisconsin, United States, the station is currently owned by Central Wisconsin Broadcasting, Inc. and features programming from Westwood One.
