= John Steinmann =

American architect (1914–1987)

John Steinmann (1914–1987) was an American architect. He designed St. John's Lutheran Church (Evansville, Wisconsin) (1958), listed on the National Register of Historic Places. Steinmann's father was an architect, and his son would become one as well. He was born in Monticello, Wisconsin and studied at the University of Illinois, Champaign-Urbana campus. He established his practice with his brother Howard Steinmann. His work includes high schools and residential buildings including the Prudhon House (1967) at 245 Clifton Street in Evansville, Wisconsin. He died in Madison, Wisconsin. Steinmann was influenced by Frank Lloyd Wright.

== Work ==
- Karakahl Inn in Mount Horeb, Wisconsin
- Wisconsin Pavilion for the 1964 New York World’s Fair, relocated to the edge of Neillsville, Wisconsin
- St. John's Lutheran Church, Evansville, Wisconsin
- Donald Beger House (1948)
- Clarence Gonstead Chiropractic Building (Gonstead Clinic of Chiropractic) (1964)
- Dr Maxine Bennett house in Madison, Wisconsin
- Maxine Bennett house (circa 1956)
