= Wisconsin Historical Society =

Agency of Wisconsin, United States

Wisconsin Historical Society (WisHistory)

Agency overview
- Formed: 1846
- Jurisdiction: Wisconsin
- Headquarters: 816 State Street Madison, Wisconsin 53706
- Agency executive: Christian W. Øverland, Ruth and Hartley Baker Director & CEO
- Parent agency: State of Wisconsin
- Website: wisconsinhistory.org

- State Historical Society Library
- U.S. National Register of Historic Places
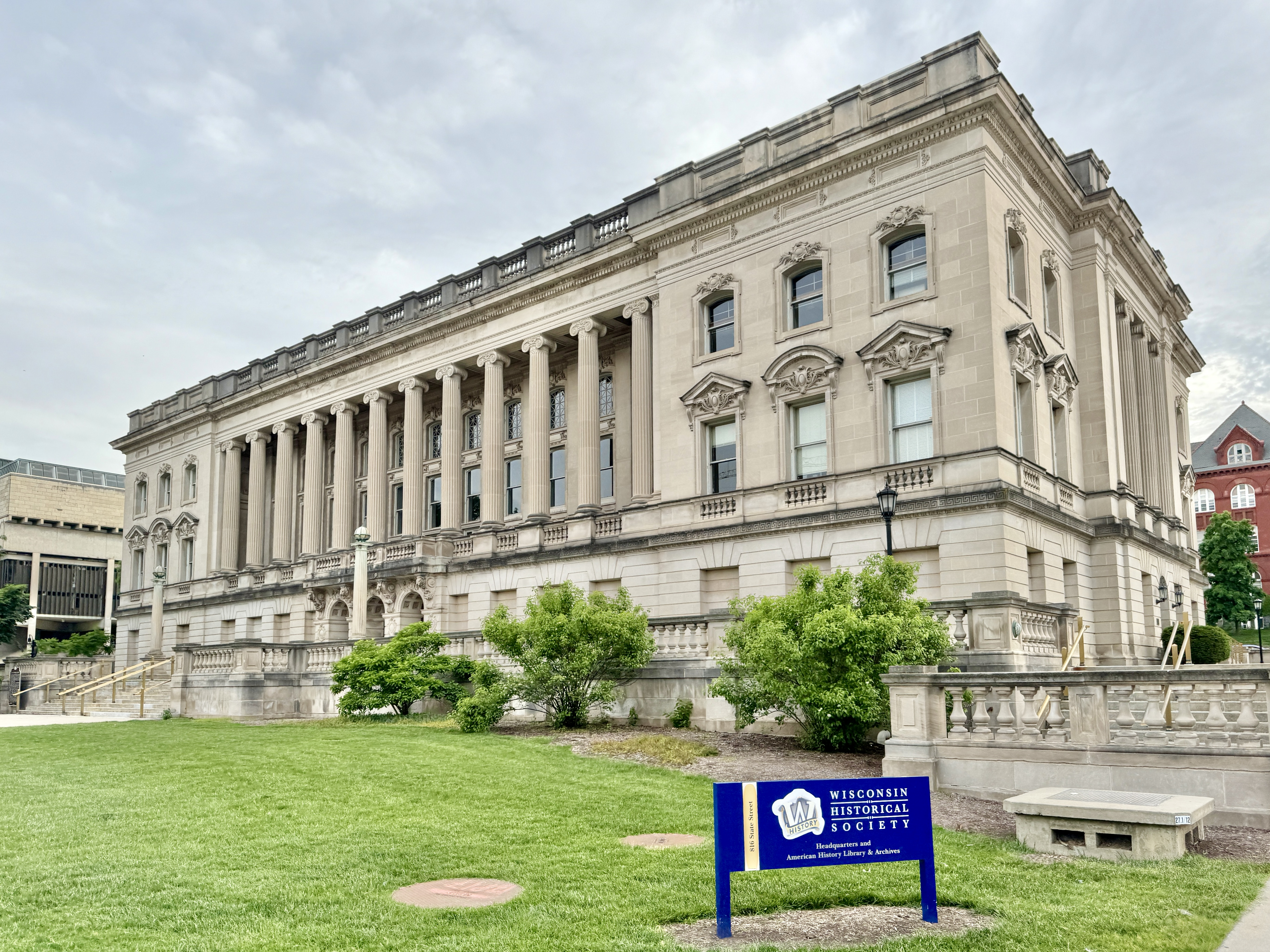
- The Society's headquarters and library
- Location: 816 State Street, Madison, Wisconsin
- Built: 1896-1900
- Architect: Ferry & Clas
- Architectural style: Neoclassical
- NRHP reference No.: 72000049
- Added to NRHP: February 23, 1972

The Wisconsin Historical Society (officially the State Historical Society of Wisconsin) is simultaneously a state agency and a private membership organization whose purpose is to maintain, promote and spread knowledge relating to the history of North America, with an emphasis on the state of Wisconsin and the trans-Allegheny West. Founded in 1846 and chartered in 1853, it is the oldest historical society in the United States to receive continuous public funding. The society's headquarters are located in Madison, Wisconsin, on the campus of the University of Wisconsin–Madison.

== History of the society itself ==
=== Beginnings ===
Massachusetts had formed its state historical society 170 years after the Pilgrims arrived. Because of that delay, parts of that colony's early history were lost. With that in mind, some of Wisconsin Territory's early history-minded leaders began advocating in 1845 for creation of a state historical society. In late 1846 during the convention to write a state constitution, two meetings were held to organize a state historical society. They adopted a constitution for the society, chose A. Hyatt Smith of Janesville as first president, and chose Governor Doty as one of the vice-presidents. But the newborn historical society seems to have done little for its first few years.

In January 1849, after Wisconsin became a state, interested parties met in the Senate chamber and revived the society, electing Governor Dewey as president and Increase A. Lapham as corresponding secretary, among other officers. They drafted a constitution for the society which laid out its purpose, including: "...to preserve the materials for a complete history of Wisconsin embracing the antiquities, and the history of the Indian tribes." This iteration of the society arranged annual speeches and started a book collection, but didn't accomplish a lot because it still had no paid secretary.

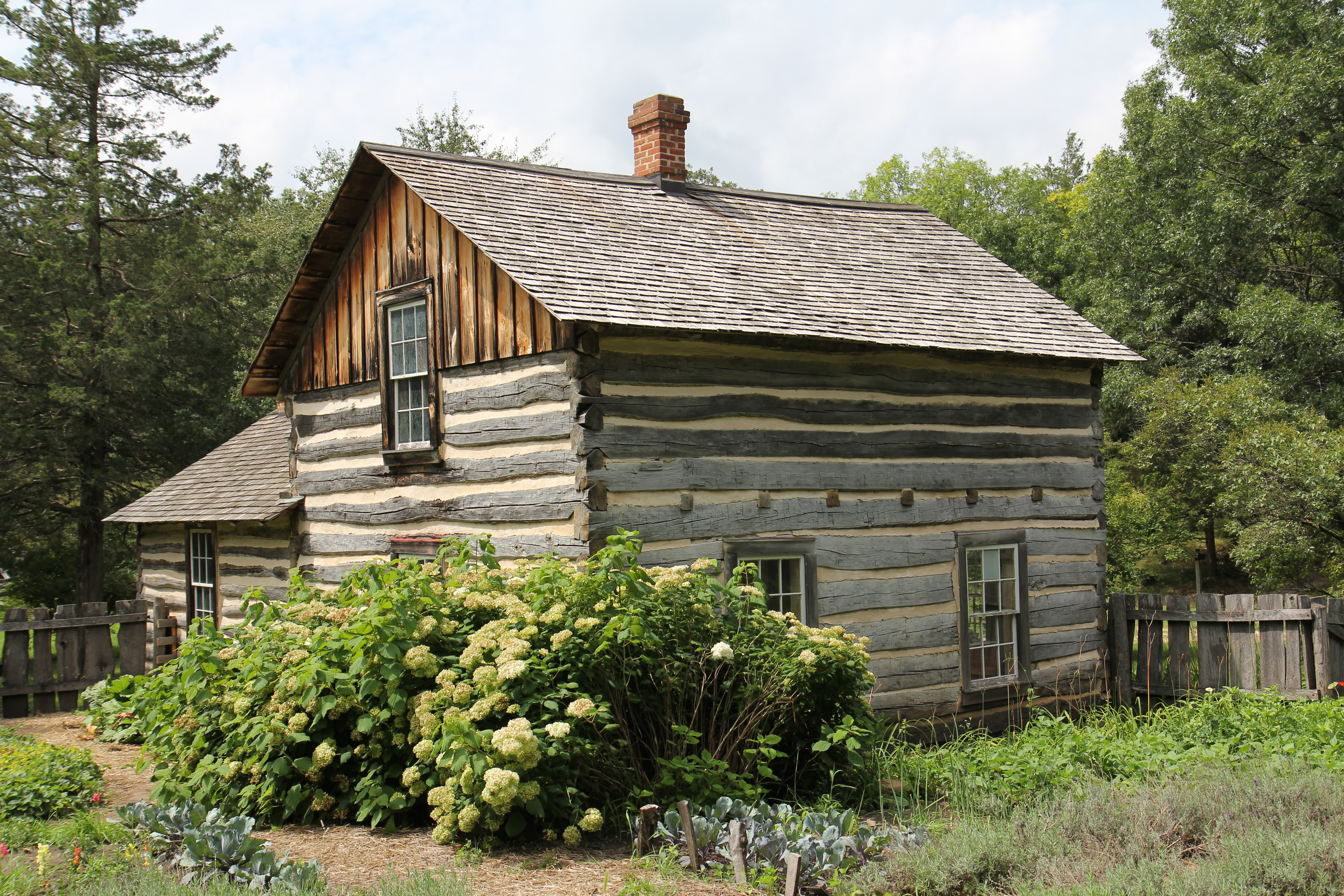
The Pederson house at Old World Wisconsin

In 1853 the legislature gave the young historical society a charter and $500 to finance its mission. The members chose Lyman Draper as corresponding secretary and adopted a new constitution which elaborated on the society's aim:

The object of the Society shall be to collect, embody, arrange and preserve in authentic form a library of books, pamphlets, maps, charts, manuscripts, papers, paintings, statuary, and other materials illustrative of the history of the State, to rescue from oblivion the memory of its early pioneers and to obtain and preserve narratives of their exploits, perils and hardy adventures; to exhibit faithfully the antiquities and the past and present condition and resources of Wisconsin, and may take proper steps, to promote the study of History by lectures, and to diffuse and publish information relating to the description and history of the State.

Unlike some other states, the founders decided that Wisconsin's historical society should not restrict its membership to elites, but should be open to anyone interested, if they paid their dues.

=== Early progress ===
With these changes and with Draper carrying the ball, the new Society began making progress. Draper asked for donations of publications from historians and public figures, narratives and old letters from early settlers, descriptions of Indians and Indian mounds, newspapers, pamphlets, and so forth. In 1855 the Society began publishing the Wisconsin Historic Collections every three years, which printed some of the accounts of early Wisconsin which the Society was receiving. At the start of the Civil War Draper asked several Wisconsin army officers to send him relics of the war and encouraged soldiers to keep diaries of their experiences. When the South Wing of the Wisconsin State Capitol was completed in 1866, the Society was allowed to occupy the entire second floor with its "Historical Rooms". In 1875 the Society acquired the Perkins Collection of 9,000 stone and copper Indian artifacts. The Society was seeing 20,000 to 35,000 visitors each year and by 1876 had the largest library west of Washington DC.

Reuben Gold Thwaites took over from Draper in 1887. He identified gaps in the Society's collection and travelled around the state seeking to fill them. He sent staff to libraries outside Wisconsin to copy Wisconsin-related documents. He strengthened ties with the UW by opening the Society's library and source materials to UW students, which was a new thing for a non-university library. He hired assistants Annie Nunns, Mary Stuart Foster and Iva Welsh, who were so important to the Society that their long period of influence has been called "The Matriarchy." He hired Louise Phelps Kellogg as a research assistant in 1901. He improved the Society's museum displays, to serve the general public who were less interested in the Society's library. In line with Progressive Era ideas, Thwaites encouraged local historical societies around the state, and in 1898 advocated state legislation to establish a network of local historical societies, guided by the WHS. Local societies in Green Bay and Ripon were the first to affiliate, in 1899. By this point, the WHS was seen as one of the leading historical societies in the US.

The physical presence of the Historical Society had started as one bookcase in the state capitol in 1849. After that, the collection resided in Lyman Draper's basement, then the basement of his church, and back to the capitol. These locations were somewhat inconvenient and certainly vulnerable to fire. Meanwhile, the UW had outgrown its own 1878 Library Hall. In 1891, UW President Thomas Chrowder Chamberlin suggested that the Historical Society ask the state legislature for a new building to house libraries of both the UW and the Historical Society. The legislature granted money starting in 1895 and architectural plans were solicited. After some critique and rework, the design from Ferry & Clas of Milwaukee was selected. The building was constructed from 1896 to 1900. The new building was just in the nick of time. In pitching the new building, Thwaites had described the state capitol as a fire-trap, and indeed most of the capitol burned in 1904.

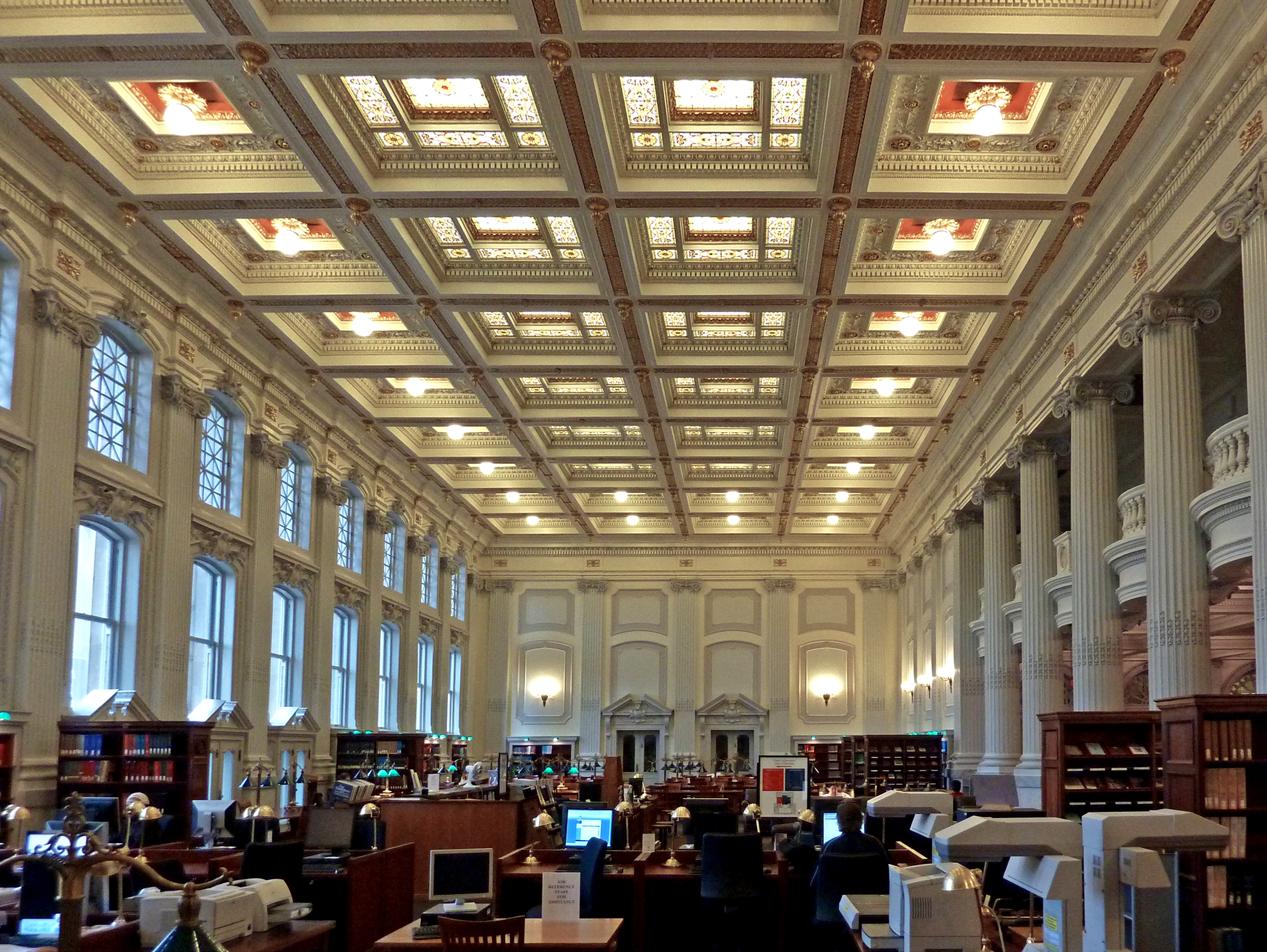
The library reading room.

Ferry & Clas's building is considered one of the finest Neoclassical Revival designs in Wisconsin. The facade is four stories tall, with a central colonnade across the second and third stories flanked by blocks of windows, all of Bedford sandstone with many features carved. The footprint was U-shaped, with the colonaded front the base of the U. Behind the colonade, in the base of the U, is a large reading room a full two stories tall, which was shared by the UW and the Historical Society. Only one upright of the U was initially built, for lack of funds; it extended back from the south end of the base of the U and in the first years held the stacks of both the Historical Society and the UW. By 1914 that wing was filled and the state financed building the northern wing of the U. By the late 40s the whole building was again bursting at the seams, so the state financed a new, separate library for the UW. The UW moved out of the shared building in 1952, leaving the whole building to the Historical Society.

In 1907, as a result of the capitol fire, the legislature made the Historical Society responsible for preserving and distributing the records of the state. That same year, the Society organized a new museum division and brought on Charles E. Brown to lead it.

After Thwaites' unexpected death in 1913, historian Milo Quaife was chosen to lead. During his tenure, the Society struggled with shortages during the first World War and after, and Quaife never won over the Matriarchy, but he did expand the Society's publications - in particular with the 1917 launch of Wisconsin Magazine of History, a quarterly that prints historical papers aimed at laymen instead of academics. Quaife was succeeded by Wisconsin native Joseph Schafer, who initiated a statewide historical survey modelled on the ancient English Domesday Book. The Society Museum remained popular, but publications faltered, the Great Depression forced more budget cuts, and then in the early 1940s many of the old hands died or retired.

=== Progress from WWII on ===
Starting in 1941 under Edward Alexander and then Clifford Lord the Society focused more on supporting local historical societies around the state. In 1947 the Society began encouraging junior historian chapters in elementary and middle schools, sending them Badger History magazine, which contained articles aimed at those age levels and articles written by the students themselves. When the state began placing historical markers along roadsides to encourage tourism, the Society guided the project. In 1952 the Society opened the Villa Louis to the public - the first of about a dozen permanent historic sites/living history museums sprinkled around the state. In 1954 the Society launched its Historymobile, a mobile museum which travelled all over the state, changing the exhibit each year.

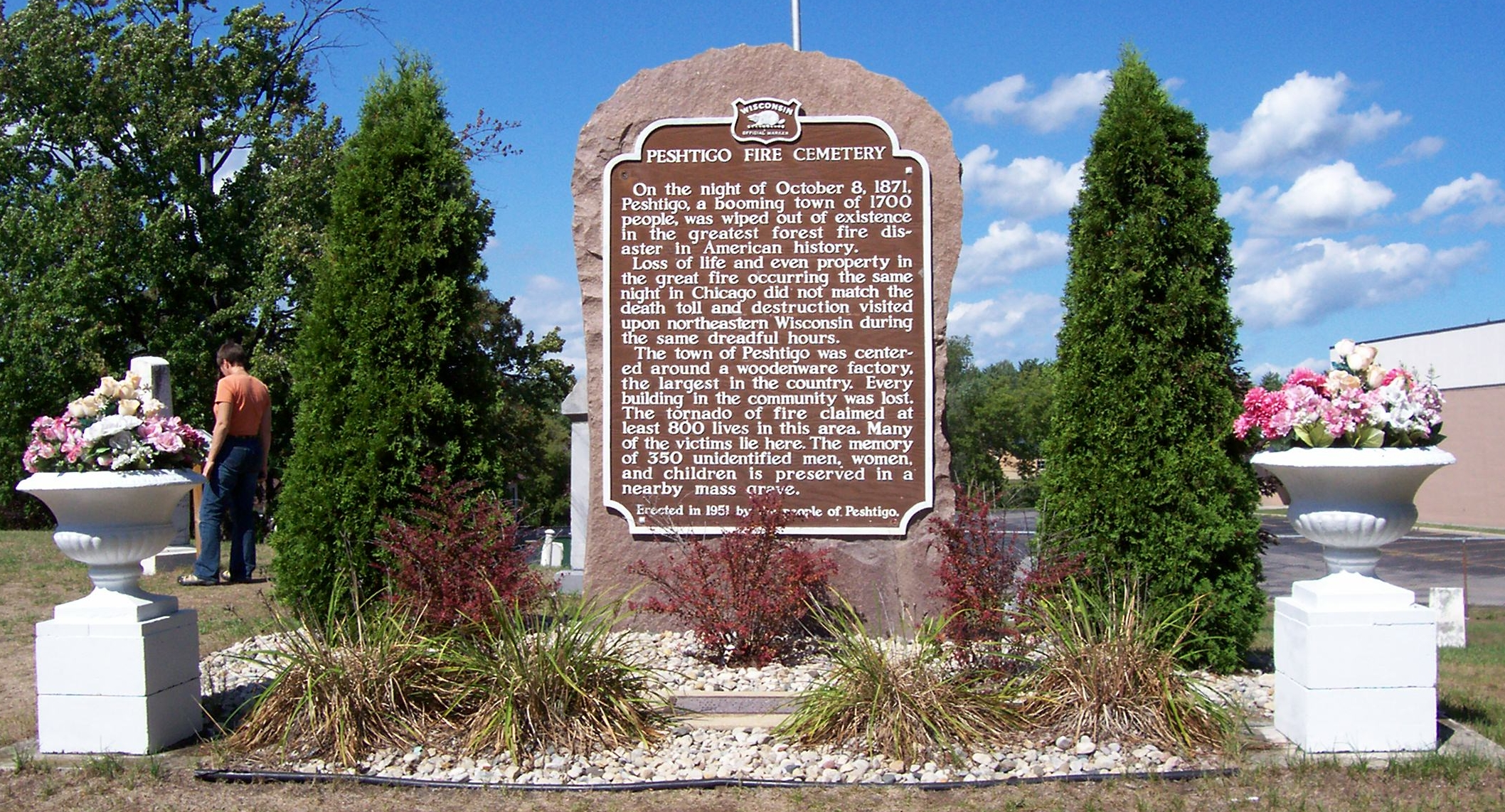
First Historical marker, installed at Peshtigo Fire Cemetery in 1951

Other things were changing in the Alexander/Lord era. To ease space problems before the UW library moved out, the Society's library began shifting to microfilm storage. After WWII, the society began collecting some materials at a national level, including archives from the McCormick family, NBC, and MTM Enterprises. The Society began updating its museum displays, adding color and better lighting and moving some displays to the first floor where more visitors would run across them. Alexander believed that "museums need not look like morgues."

In the 1930s and 40s, the Society began producing history programming to run on Wisconsin Public Radio. In the 1950s and '60s that expanded to video to air on public TV. The society had long documented social movements like Communism and entitlements; in the 1960s that turned to the Civil rights movement, among other trends. The Society also established Area Research Centers, in which the historical documents pertinent to the Eau Claire area, for example, are stored in Eau Claire to be convenient for those who are most interested. In 1963 the Society helped Milwaukee develop a historic preservation ordinance, to be followed by many other communities. With the National Historic Preservation Act of 1966, the Society became a designated gatekeeper/advisor for National Register of Historic Places sites in Wisconsin.

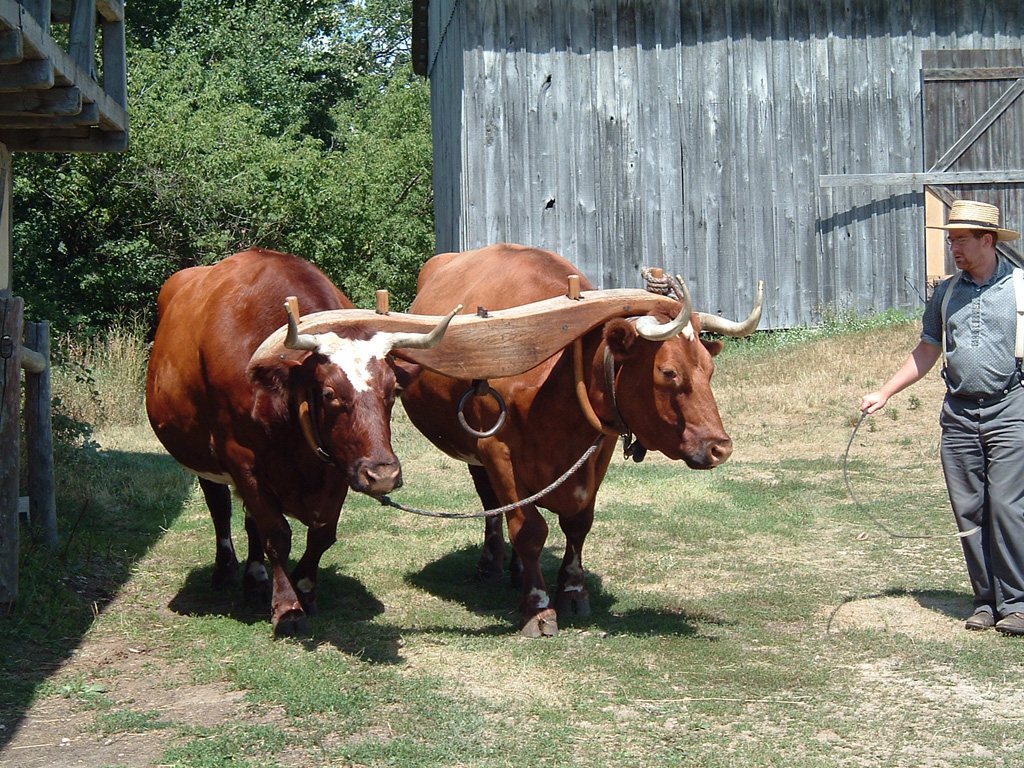
Yoked oxen at Old World Wisconsin

In the 1970s the Society opened Old World Wisconsin, the living history museum which presents the farms and daily life of settlers of various ethnicities. The Society also began teaching classes on genealogy and reorganizing its catalogs, responding to new interest inspired by the U.S. Bicentennial. The Society began producing the 6-volume History of Wisconsin series and began the Documentary History of the Ratification of the Constitution, a standard reference work for judges and constitutional scholars nationwide. In 1980, with the Society's building bulging, it bought the Wolff, Kubly & Hirsig hardware store on Capitol Square and converted it to house the Museum, which moved there in 1986.

In the 1980s the Society began computerizing its collections, and in 1993 made its catalog available over the Internet, at which point requests began arriving from new types of users across the country. Four years later the Society launched its website wisconsinhistory.org, again sharing its resources beyond the bounds of its building and Madison. Through all this, the Society continued opening more historic sites around the state like the H.H. Bennett Studio, and arranging special events at those sites like the Villa Louis Carriage Classic.

In the 1990s the Society began supporting elementary and middle-schools by producing a new textbook for teaching Wisconsin history to fourth-graders, along with teacher guides and other Wisconsin history books for younger readers. In 2005 the Badger Biographies series started. In 2001 the Society joined the nationwide National History Day, in which students in grades six through twelve pick historical topics to research and create presentations on. Also in 2001, the State Historical Society of Wisconsin rebranded itself as the Wisconsin Historical Society, a decision which was criticized by some historians for removing the emphasis on the society as a "state" institution. "State Historical Society of Wisconsin" remains the official name of the institution in state law, after an attempt by legislators to change it failed. The shorter name had long been used unofficially, and the Society's name was already abbreviated as "WHS" in many cases rather than "SHSW". As of 2024, the Society is replacing its 40-year-old museum with a newer museum building on the same site, planned to open in 2027.

== Modern Organization ==
The Wisconsin Historical Society is organized into four divisions: the Division of Library, Archives and Museum Collections, the Division of Museums and Historic Sites, the Division of Historic Preservation-Public History, and the Division of Administrative Services.

=== Division of Library, Archives and Museum Collections ===
The Division of Library, Archives and Museum Collections collects and maintains books and documents about the history of Wisconsin, the United States, and Canada. The society's library and archives, which together serve as the library of American history for the University of Wisconsin–Madison, contain nearly four million items, making the society's collection the largest in the world dedicated exclusively to North American history. The Wisconsin Historical Society's extensive newspaper collection is the second largest in the United States after the Library of Congress. Visual materials in the archives include some three million photographs, negatives, films, architectural drawings, cartoons, lithographs, posters, and a variety of visual ephemera. The Wisconsin Center for Film and Theater Research is also housed within the division. The society's archives also serve as the official repository for state and local government records. The society coordinates an Area Research Center Network, an alliance between the Historical Society in Madison and four-year campuses of the University of Wisconsin System throughout the state and the Northern Great Lakes History Center in Ashland, to make most of the archival collections accessible to state residents. The society's museum collections are maintained in the Collections Division containing objects relating to Wisconsin history.

=== Division of Museums and Historic Sites ===
The Division of Museums and Historic Sites operates the Wisconsin Historical Museum in downtown Madison and 11 historic sites throughout the state. The museum has an archaeology program in collaboration with the Department of Transportation and the Department of Natural Resources that undertakes research, and collects and preserves historical artifacts. The other historic sites are tourist attractions that display historic buildings reflecting Wisconsin history and provide exhibitions and demonstrations of state history, such as ethnic settlement, mining, farming, fur trading, transportation, and pioneering life.

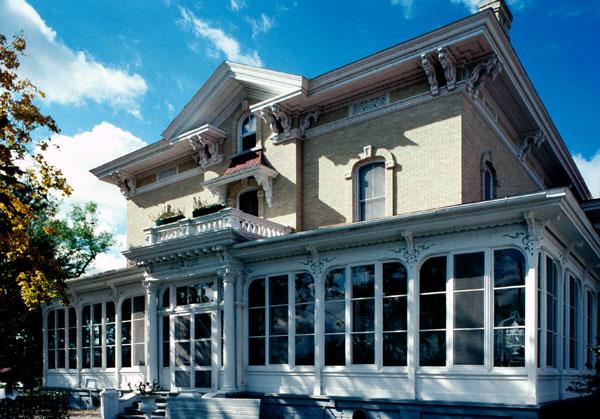
Villa Louis Historic Site, Prairie du Chien, which is operated by the Society

Historic Site	Location
Black Point Estate	Lake Geneva, Wisconsin
Circus World Museum	Baraboo, Wisconsin
First Capitol	Belmont, Wisconsin
H. H. Bennett Studio	Wisconsin Dells, Wisconsin
Madeline Island Museum	La Pointe, Wisconsin
Old World Wisconsin	Eagle, Wisconsin
Pendarvis	Mineral Point, Wisconsin
Reed School	Neillsville, Wisconsin
Stonefield	Cassville, Wisconsin
Sylvanus Wade House	Greenbush, Wisconsin
Villa Louis	Prairie du Chien, Wisconsin

=== Division of Historic Preservation-Public History ===
The Division of Historic Preservation-Public History administers the state's historic preservation program, the state's burial sites preservation program, and the Wisconsin Historical Society Press, which publishes books on Wisconsin and American history and a quarterly magazine, the Wisconsin Magazine of History. The division also provides outreach to local historical societies.

=== Wisconsin Magazine of History ===
The Wisconsin Magazine of History (ISSN 1943-7366) is a quarterly journal published by the WHS since September 1917. The society maintains a fully digitized archive that contains more than 2,000 feature articles totaling more than 30,000 pages.

=== Division of Administrative Services ===
The Division of Administrative Services provides support and planning for the WHS and its divisions.

The society's website includes a large, searchable collection of historical images and a vast digital archive containing thousands of scanned documents relating to Wisconsin history.

Wisconsin Historical Society employees are employees of the State of Wisconsin.

== Notable people ==
- John Givan Davis Mack, professor of engineering and curator of the WHS library
- F. Gerald Ham, former Wisconsin state archivist and director of the Division of Library-Archives

== See also ==
- Google Books Library Project
- List of historical societies in Wisconsin
