= Charles and Theresa Cornelius House =

Historic house in Wisconsin, United States

- U.S. National Register of Historic Places
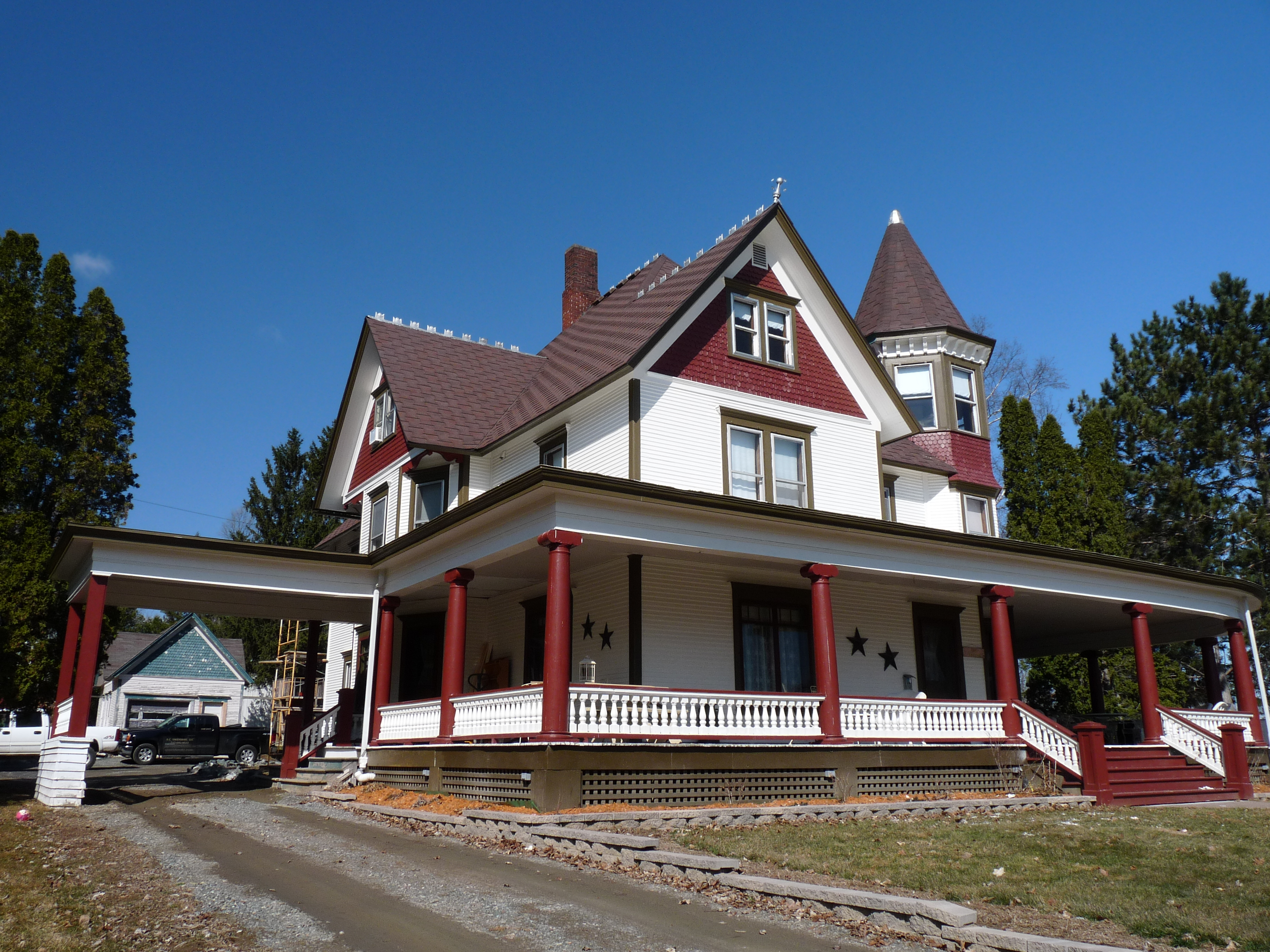
- Charles and Theresa Cornelius House
- Location: 118 Clay St. Neillsville, Wisconsin
- Built: 1909
- Architect: Anton F. Billmeyer
- Architectural style: Queen Anne
- NRHP reference No.: 13000749
- Added to NRHP: October 18, 2013

The Charles and Theresa Cornelius House is located in Neillsville, Wisconsin.

== History ==
Charles Cornelius was a noted businessman and banker. After his death, the house was converted into a funeral home and later apartments before efforts began to turn it back into a single dwelling. It was added to the State Register of Historic Places in 2012 and to the National Register of Historic Places the following year.
