= Neillsville Municipal Airport =

Airport in Neillsville, Wisconsin, United States

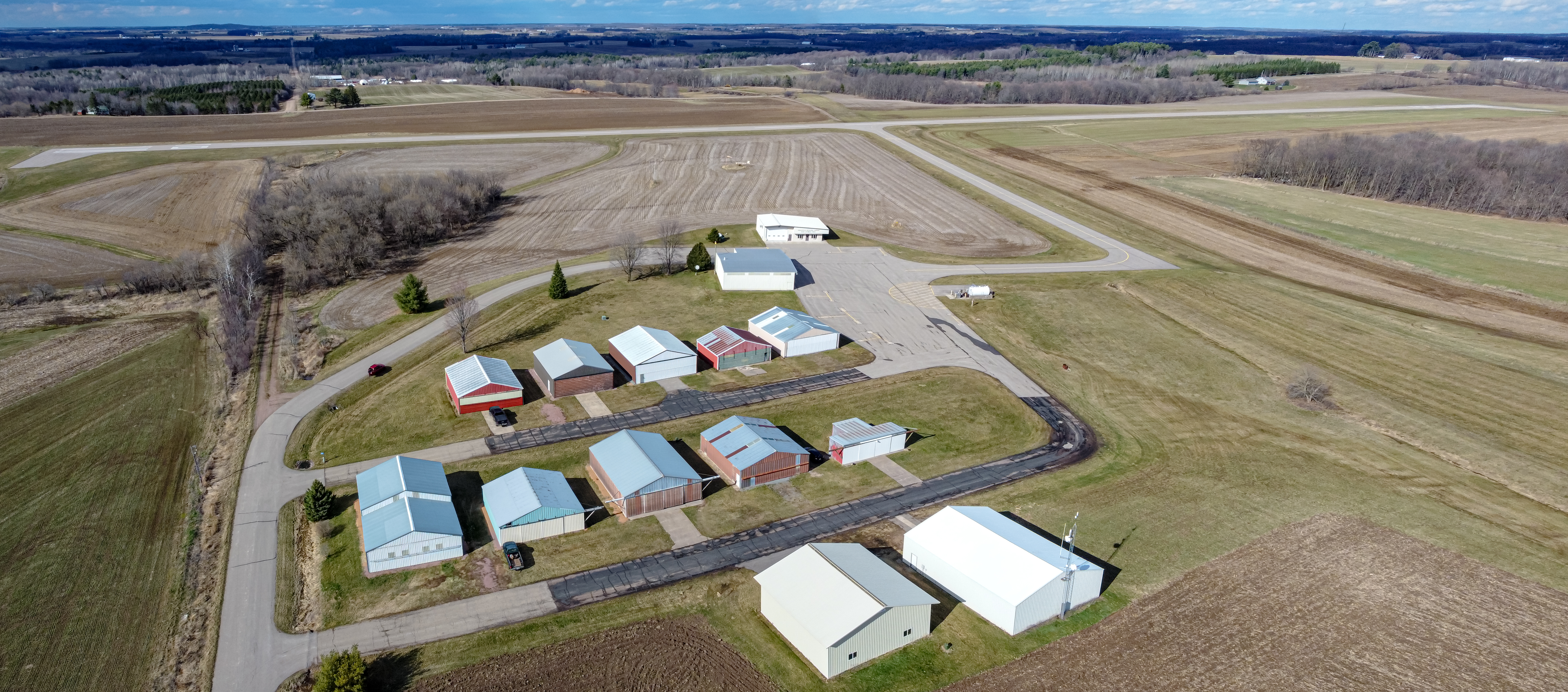
- IATA: none; ICAO: KVIQ; FAA LID: VIQ

Summary
- Airport type: Public
- Owner: City of Neillsville
- Serves: Neillsville, Wisconsin
- Opened: April 1974; 52 years ago
- Time zone: CST (UTC−06:00)
  - Summer (DST): CDT (UTC−05:00)
- Elevation AMSL: 1,238 ft / 377 m
- Coordinates: 44°33′29″N 090°30′44″W

Map
- Location of airport in Wisconsin KVIQ/VIQ (the United States)

Runways
Direction	Length		Surface
Direction	ft	m	Surface
10/28	3,400	1,036	Asphalt

Statistics
- Aircraft operations (2021): 7,520
- Based aircraft (2024): 16
- Source: Federal Aviation Administration

Neillsville Municipal Airport (ICAO: KVIQ, FAA LID: VIQ) is a city owned public use airport located three nautical miles (6 km) east of the central business district of Neillsville, a city in Clark County, Wisconsin, United States. It is also known as Kurt Listeman Field. It is included in the Federal Aviation Administration (FAA) National Plan of Integrated Airport Systems for 2025–2029, in which it is categorized as a local general aviation facility.

Although many U.S. airports use the same three-letter location identifier for the FAA and IATA, Neillsville Municipal Airport is assigned VIQ by the FAA but has no designation from the IATA (which assigned VIQ to Viqueque Airport in Viqueque, East Timor).

== Facilities and aircraft ==
Neillsville Municipal Airport covers an area of 169 acres (68 ha) at an elevation of 1,238 feet (377 m) above mean sea level. It has one runway designated 10/28 with an asphalt surface measuring 3,400 by 60 feet (1,036 x 18 m) with approved GPS and NDB approaches.

For the 12-month period ending September 7, 2021, the airport had 7,520 aircraft operations, an average of 21 per day: 93% general aviation, 7% air taxi and less than 1% military. In July 2024, there were 16 aircraft based at this airport: all 16 single-engine.

== See also ==
- List of airports in Wisconsin
