= Clark County Jail =

- U.S. National Register of Historic Places
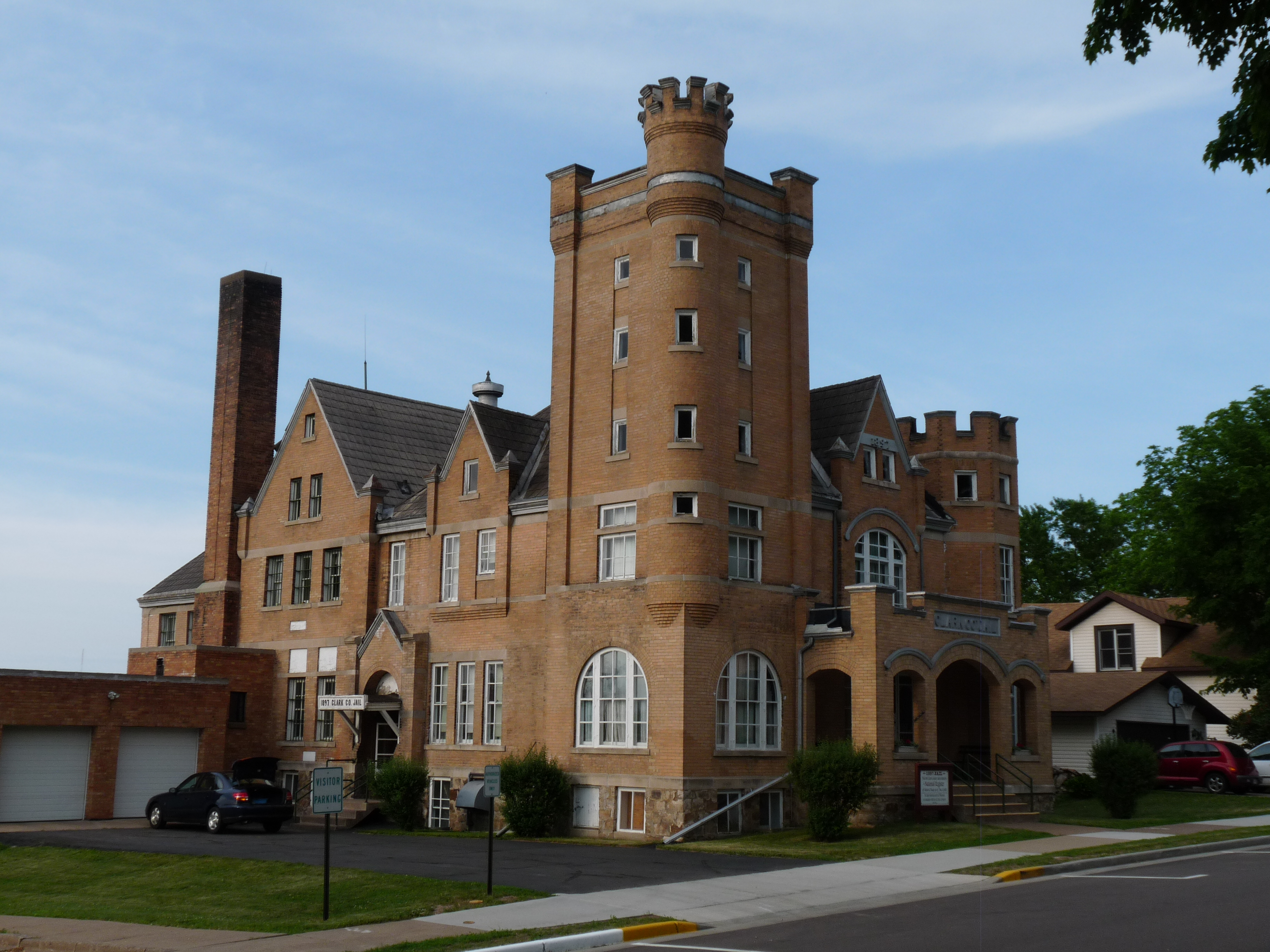
- Building in June 2011

- Location within Wisconsin Location within the United States
- Location: 215 E. 5th St., Neillsville, Wisconsin
- Coordinates: 44°33′37″N 90°35′36″W
- Area: 1 acre (0.40 ha)
- Built: 1897
- Built by: J.G. Wagner Co.
- Architect: Gustave Stoltze & Hugo Schick
- Architectural style: Romanesque
- NRHP reference No.: 78000080
- Added to NRHP: December 8, 1978

The Clark County Jail is a historic structure located in Neillsville, Wisconsin. It was added to the National Register of Historic Places in 1978. Additionally, it is listed on the Wisconsin State Register of Historic Places and is designated a historic landmark by the Neillsville Historic Preservation Commission.

== History ==
The structure originally served as a jail, as well as a residence for the Sheriff of Clark County, Wisconsin and his family in a separate portion of the building. The county stopped using the building as the sheriff's residence in 1974. In 1978, the county stopped using the jail portion, as well, and the building served as a museum until 2024. It is now closed to the public.
