= The Highground Veterans Memorial Park =

Veterans' memorial park

Coordinates: 44.563°N 90.667°W

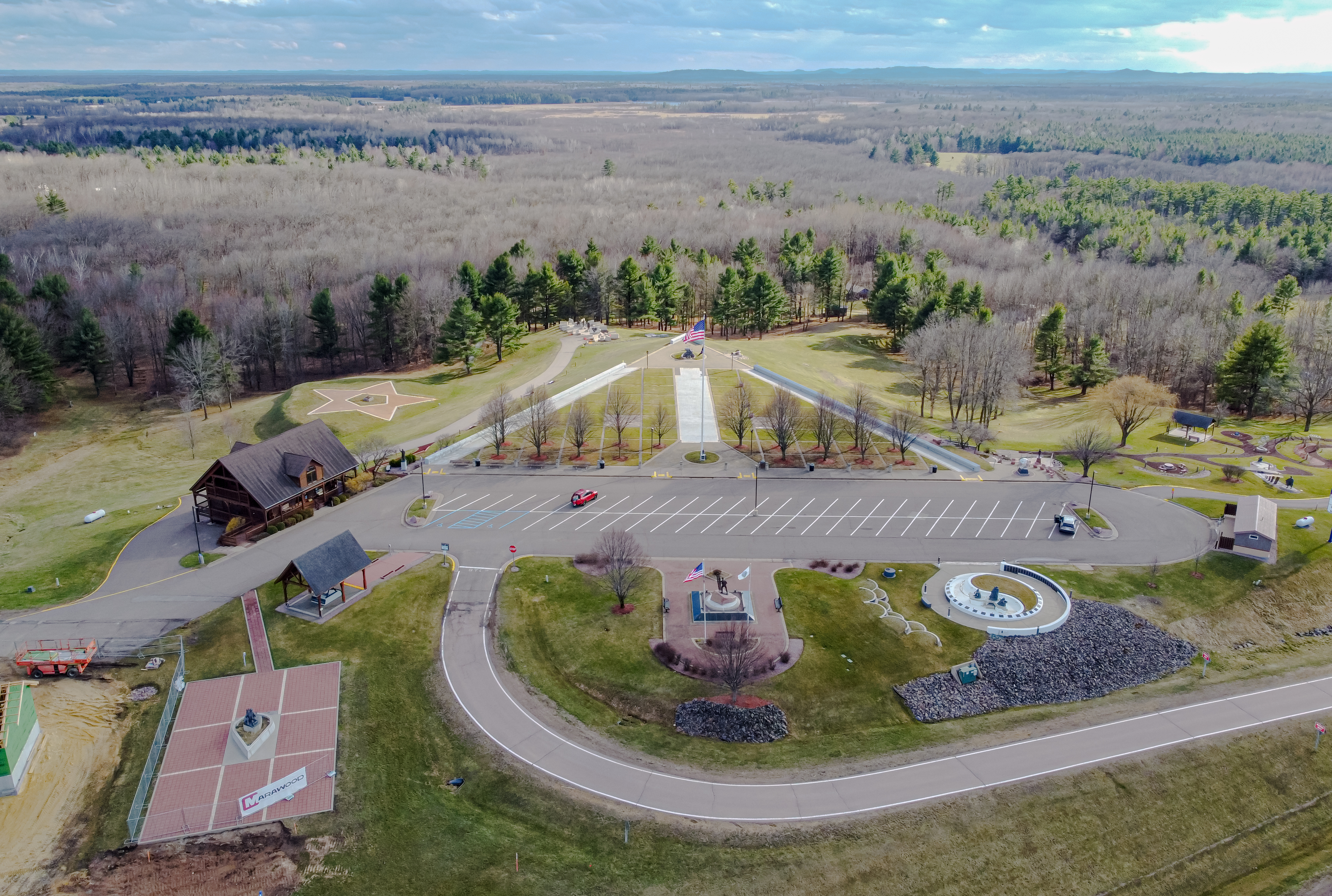
Highground Park

The Highground Veterans Memorial Park, also called The Highground, is located 4 miles (6 km) west of Neillsville, Wisconsin, USA, on Ridge Road (just off of U.S. Route 10). The memorial was built as a tribute to fallen veterans and as an honor to the surviving military personnel. The Highground is a nonprofit grassroots organization with no ongoing federal or state funding; it is run by volunteers. The park is open to the public 24/7/365.

== Visitor information ==
The park consists of a 148 acres (60 ha) plot on high land. Approximately 500,000 acres (200,000 ha) are visible from the overlook point of the plaza.

Located in the center of the state, veterans from any place in Wisconsin can get to and from The Highground in one day. The park is staffed year-round with the Gift Shop, Museum and Visitor Center open daily. During business hours, visitors are encouraged to pick up a free audio tour in the gift shop before walking the plaza. Guided tours are also available. The 45,00 square foot plaza, Effigy Mound Peace Dove, Gold Star, and all tributes are lighted in the evening, and visitors are welcome in the park 24/7. The park offers 4 miles of walking trails, bridges, and a handicap accessible treehouse. Visitors are able to ring a replica Liberty Bell. The project raises funds by selling blocks which line the memorial grounds. Additionally, various fundraisers are held throughout the year.

== History ==
In 1965, Tom Miller, holding his mortally wounded friend on a battle field in Vietnam, made a vow that his friend's death would not be forgotten. In 1984, Miller and others who made similar vows explored the possibility of creating a memorial to Vietnam veterans. The selection of Neillsville was made from 10 Wisconsin site possibilities. The WI Vietnam Veterans' Memorial Project (WVVMP, Inc.) formally incorporated in the same year.

In 1985, the first bicycle tour to raise money for The Highground took place, and in 1986, a 70-foot flagpole, flag and light became the first permanent fixtures.

The Wisconsin Vietnam Veterans' Memorial Park (later to be known as the Highground) and the "Fragments" Vietnam Veterans' Tribute were dedicated in 1988, followed by a modern Earthen Dove Effigy Mound and the Gold Star Tribute in 1989 and 1990, respectively.

In 1992, The Nurse and Doughboy tributes were dedicated and The Highground magazine's premier issue was published.

In 1993, The World War II Veterans' Tribute and Pow Wow Arena were dedicated, and the first "Warrior" Traditional pow wow ceremony was held.

The National Native American Vietnam Veterans' Tribute was dedicated in 1995. The first Legacy Stones were also placed during this year.

In 1996, the Timberframe Building (housing the Gift Shop and Information Center) was dedicated.

On July 4, 2002, the Liberty Bell Shelter was dedicated.

In 2004, the trail system was extended and long-range forest management plans (including developmental forest) was established. In the same year, the Wisconsin Counties United in Service Tribute was placed on the plaza.

In 2005, the handicap accessible Treehouse was completed and the first Meditation Stones were placed in the Meditation Garden which was dedicated in 2006 along with the Ascension of Doves, Fountain of Tears, and WASP Tribute.

In 2006, a tribute to the Women Airforce Service Pilots (WASPS) was dedicated. The WASPS were the first women trained to fly American military aircraft.

In 2007, the Korean War Tribute was dedicated and the first Korean Tribute Stones were placed on the rice paddies.

In 2009, the statuary within the Fountain of Tears tribute was dedicated, and the Hero Tribute Ride recreated the first bike tour from 1985.

The Learning Center (which houses a library, media center, and gallery) was dedicated in 2010.

In 2012, the ground was broken for a Gulf War "boot print" memorial for veterans who served in Iraq, Afghanistan, Operation Desert Shield and Operation Desert Storm.

== Images ==
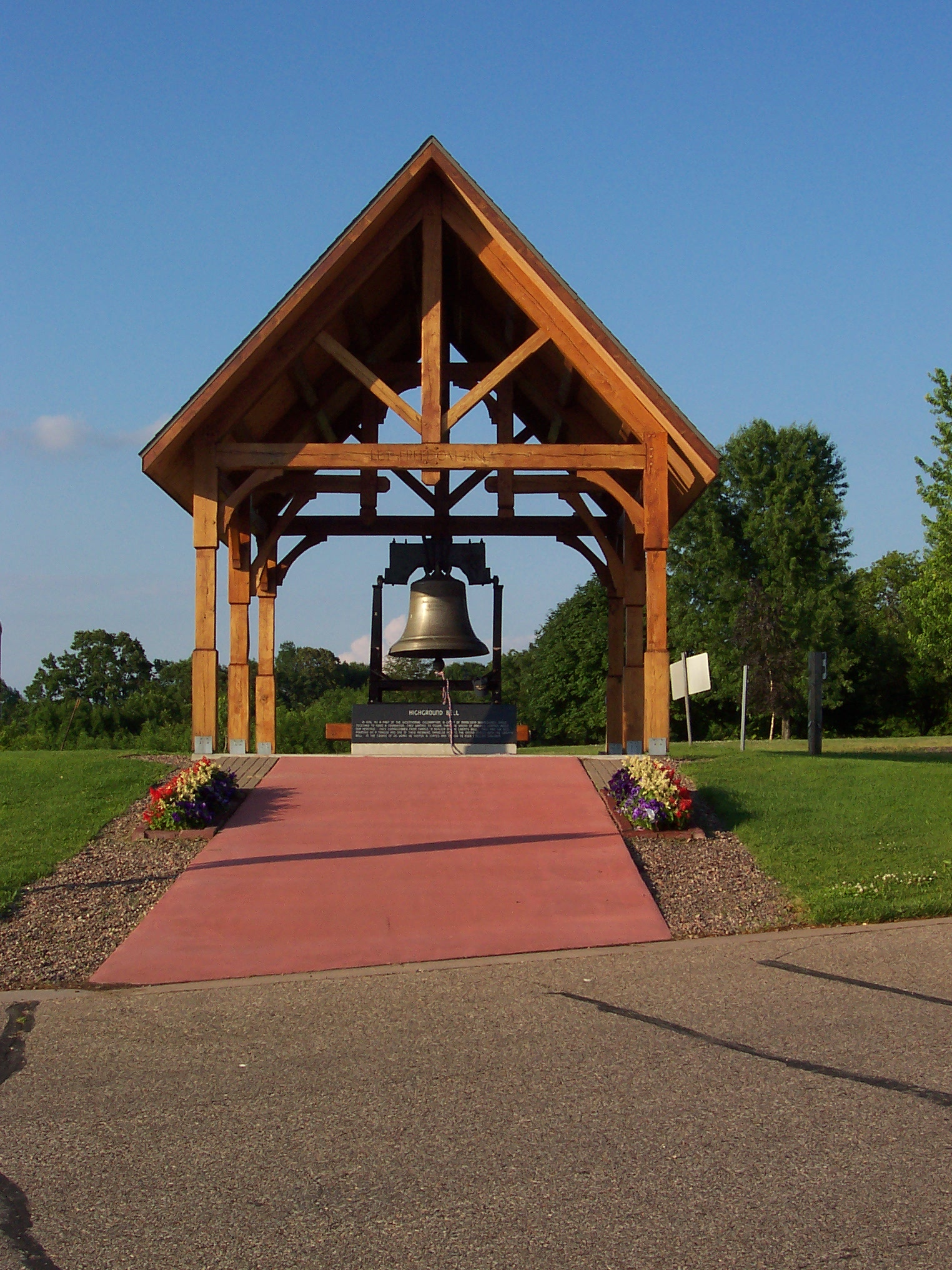
Memorial bell

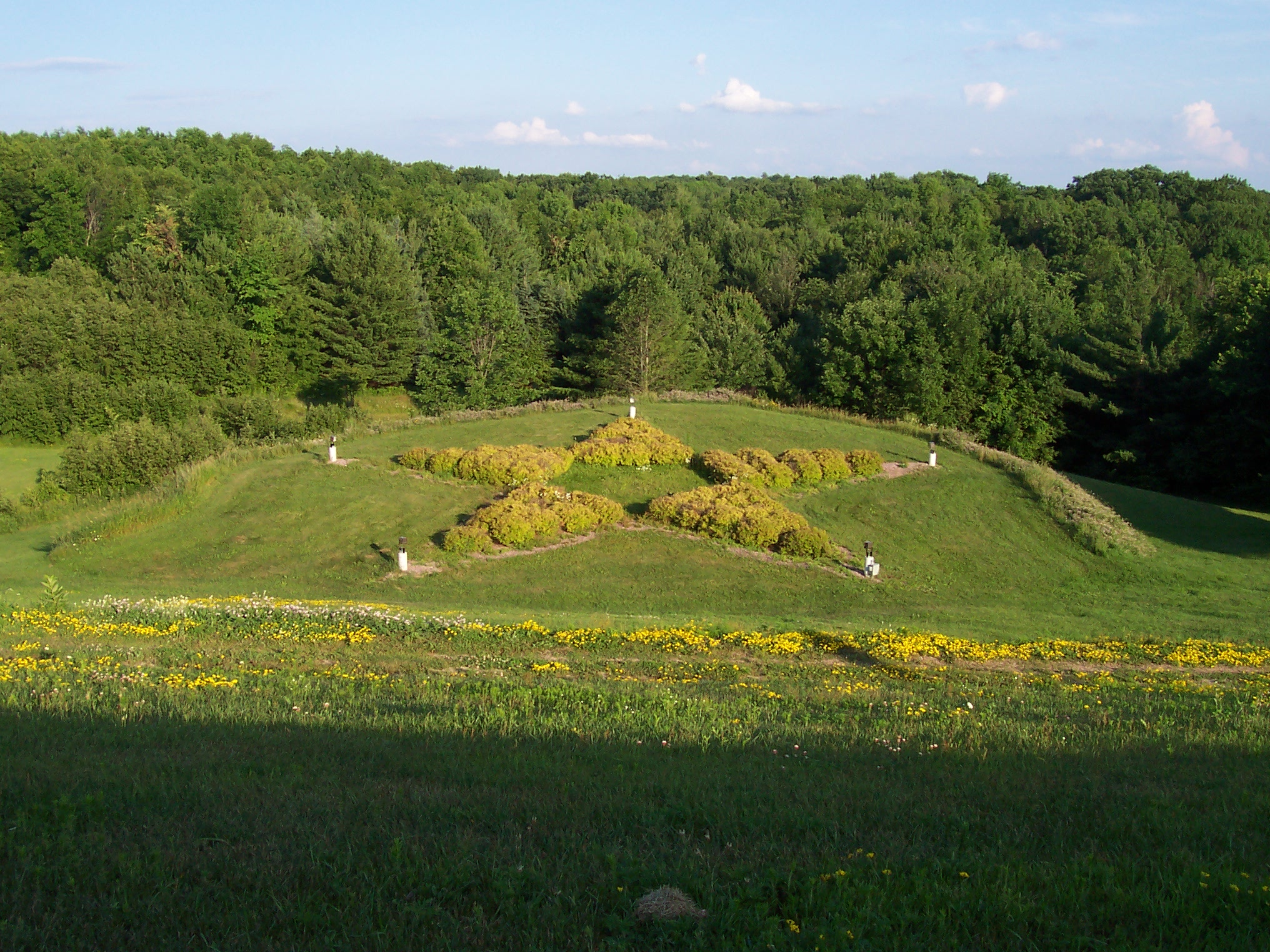
"Gold Star" Tribute

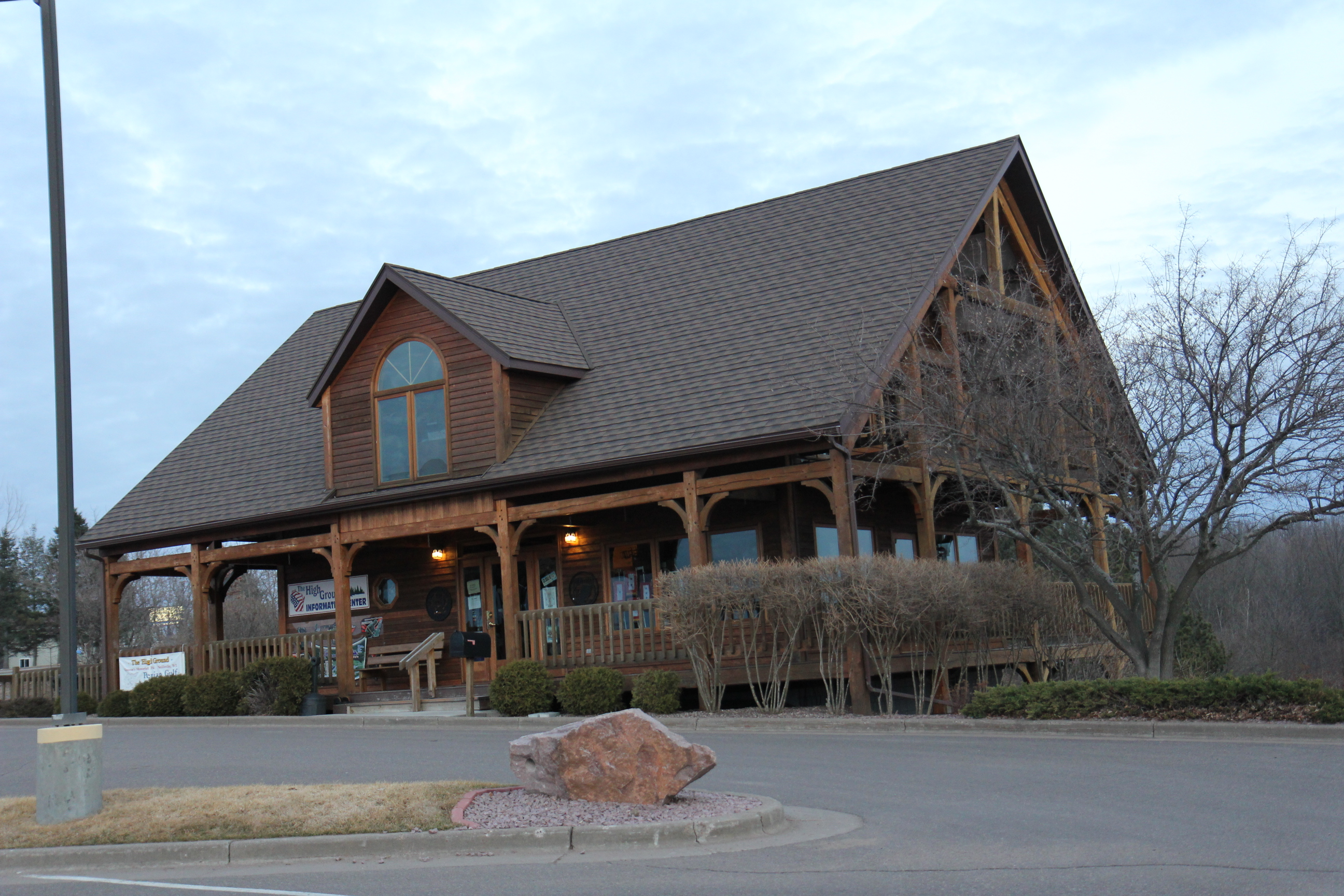
Information Center and Gift Shop
