= Reed School (Wisconsin) =

State Historic Site in Clark County, Wisconsin

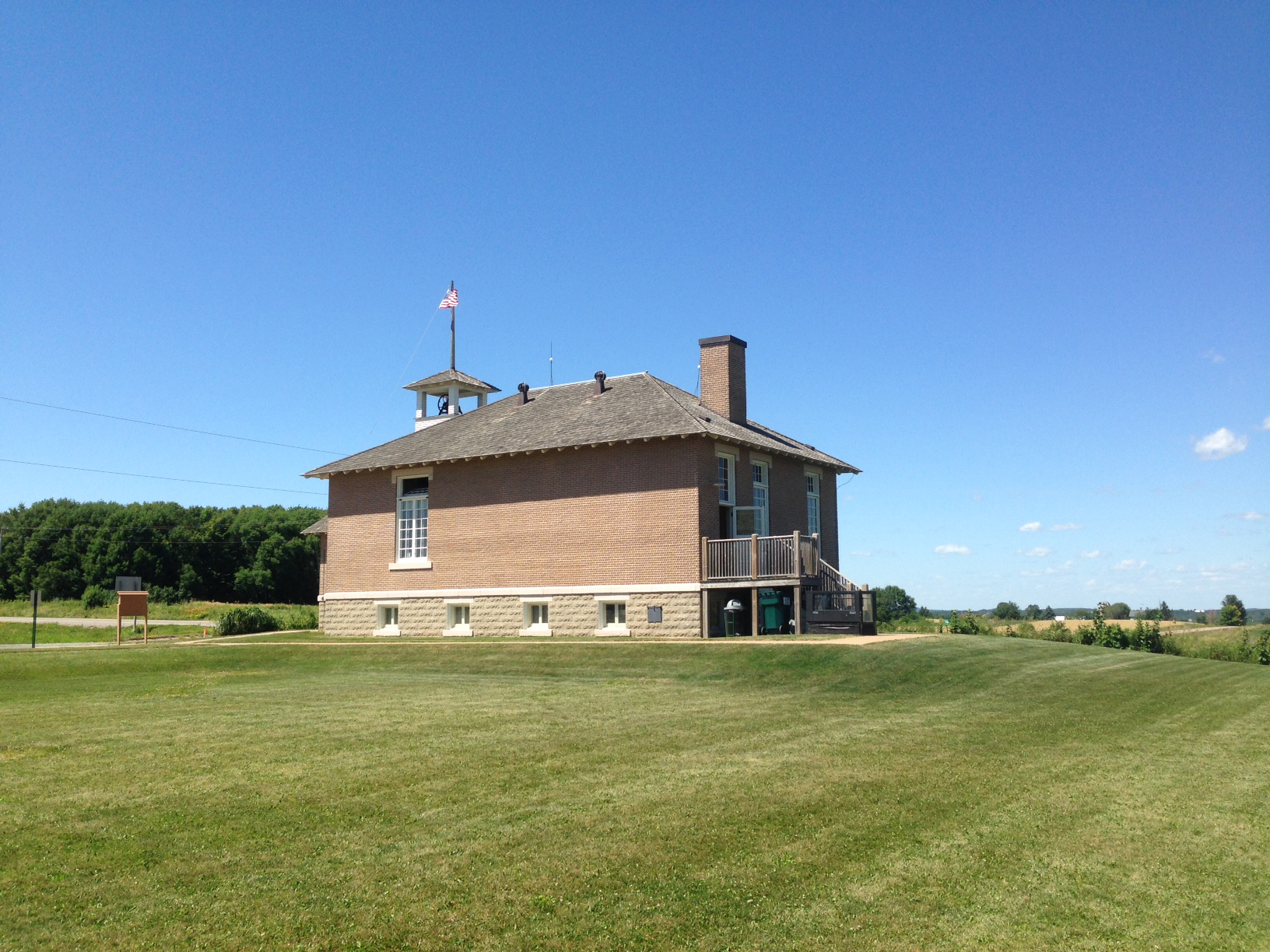
View of Reed School near Neillsvile, Wisconsin

Reed School Historic Site is a one room school museum owned and operated by the Wisconsin Historical Society. The school is located on the corner of U.S. Route 10 and Cardinal Avenue near Neillsville, Wisconsin. The classroom has been restored to its 1939 appearance and is used for school programs. The basement contains an exhibit on the history of rural education in Wisconsin. Constructed in 1915, the schoolhouse operated as a school until 1951 when it closed due to a lack of students. Reed School is a prime example of the estimated 6,000 one room schools that once operated across Wisconsin. The building was restored by former student Gordon Smith and opened as Wisconsin's 10th State Historic Site in 2007.
