= George W. and Sarah Trogner House =

Historic house in Wisconsin, United States

- U.S. National Register of Historic Places
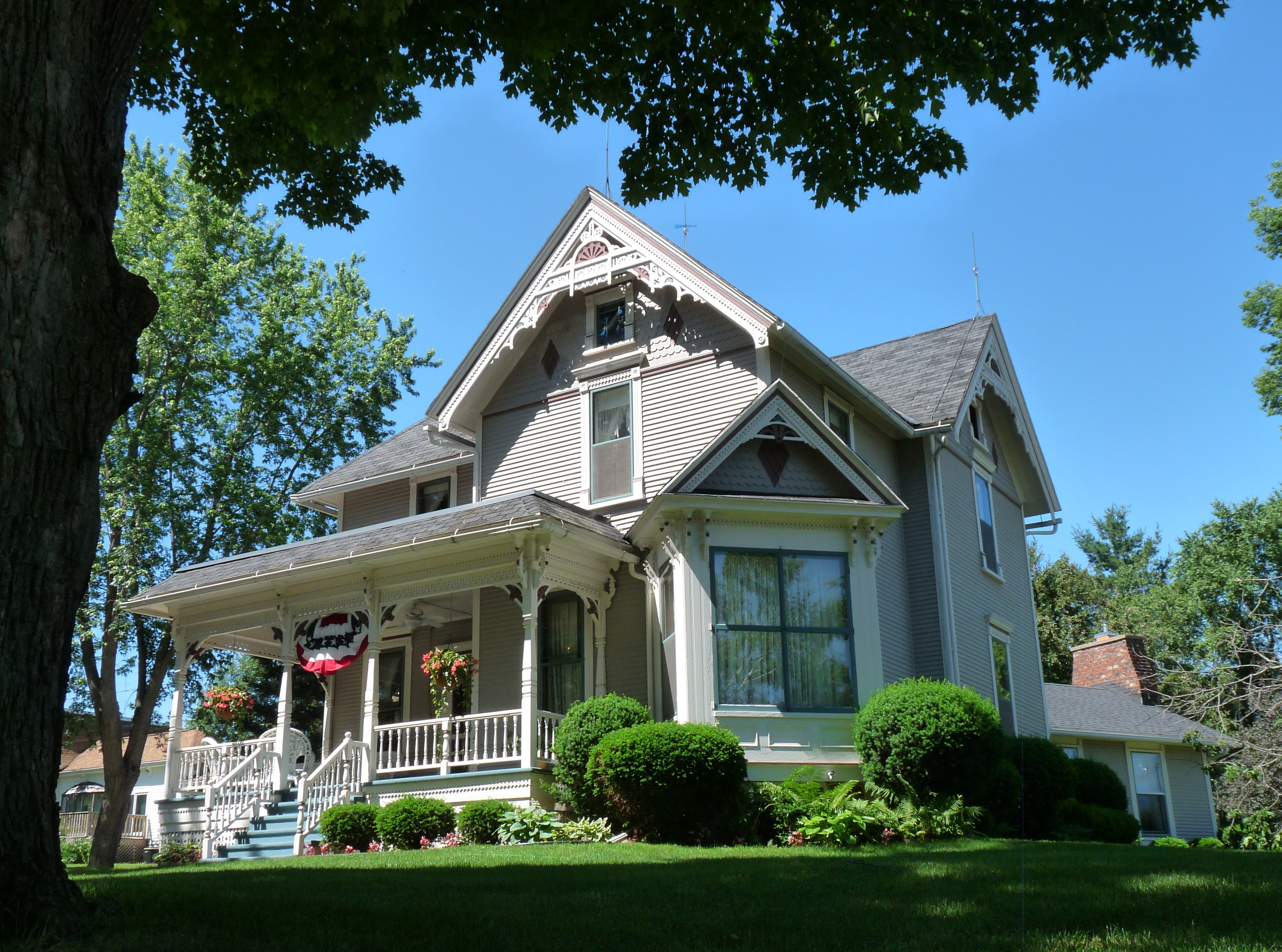
- George W. and Sarah Trogner House
- Location: 108 Grand Ave., Neillsville, Wisconsin
- Coordinates: 44°33′19″N 90°35′52″W
- Area: less than one acre
- Built: 1897
- Architect: George W. Trogner
- Architectural style: Queen Anne
- NRHP reference No.: 05000953
- Added to NRHP: September 1, 2005

The George W. and Sarah Trogner House is located in Neillsville, Wisconsin.

== History ==
The house was designed and built by Civil War veteran, wagon builder, mill owner, and carpenter George W. Trogner for his own family. It was added to the State and the National Register of Historic Places in 2005.
