= Neillsville Downtown Historic District =

Historic district in Wisconsin, United States

- U.S. National Register of Historic Places
- U.S. Historic district
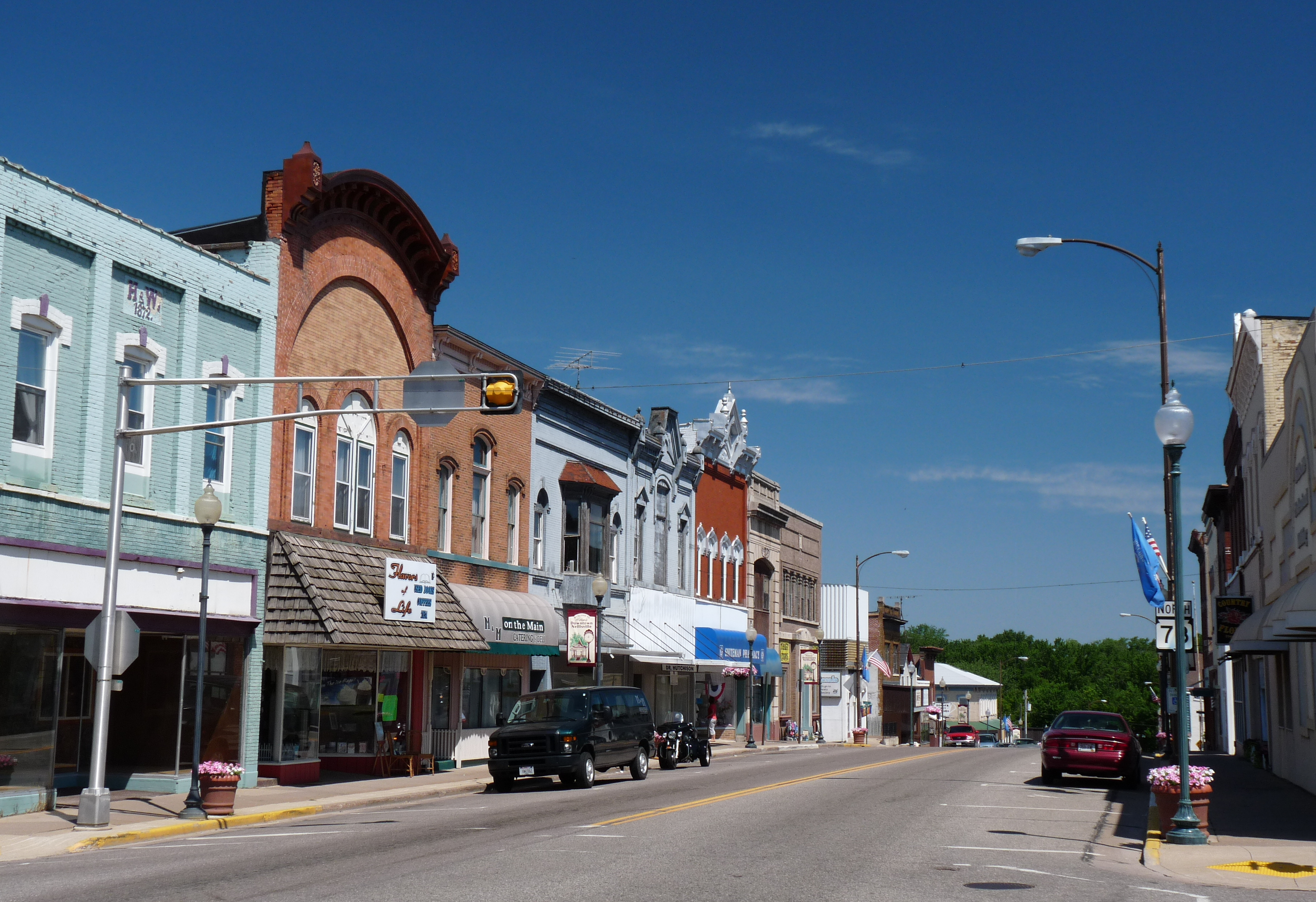

- Location within Wisconsin Location within the United States
- Interactive map of Neillsville Downtown Historic District
- Location: 500 Block Hewett St. and 118 W. Sixth St., Neillsville, Wisconsin
- Coordinates: 44°33′38″N 90°35′46″W
- Area: 2 acres (0.81 ha)
- Architectural style: Late Victorian, Late 19th And 20th Century Revivals, et al.
- NRHP reference No.: 00000701
- Added to NRHP: June 15, 2000

Neillsville Downtown Historic District is a section of the historic old downtown of Neillsville, Wisconsin, with buildings as old as 1872. It was added to the National Register of Historic Places in 2000.

== History ==
The settlement of Neillsville began when James O'Neill and his companions cut a road up through the forest from Black River Falls in June 1845. They built a sawmill on the bank of O'Neill Creek and began cutting pine and floating it downstream to their mill. The loggers prospered, more settlers came, and by 1860 the population approached 250. Businesses developed along Main Street, which is now called Hewett Street. The earliest were wood frame buildings.

The first brick structure in town (and in Clark County) was built in 1872, and is in the district - the Hewett and Woods General Store at 502 Hewett Street - the blue building on the left in the photo. Its brick is probably the "soft brick" produced locally by King and Vine. Though it is early and simple, its style shows some Italianate influence. This first brick building was called "the Brick Store" for years.

Continuing up the west side of Hewett street, and to the right in the photo:

- The Lowe Brothers building at 508 Hewett is a graceful brick building with Romanesque arches and a cast iron cornice, built in 1896. Starting in 1927 the building housed a Red Owl grocery store.
- The Bast Bakery at 510 Hewett is another brick Italianate building with cornice, built around 1890, which originally housed a meat and flour store.
- The August Snyder Clothing Store at 518 Hewett is another brick Italianate building with cornice, this one built in 1900. It has a second-story bay window which projects above the sidewalk.
- The Clark County Bank building at 522 Hewett was built in 1887, then expanded and elaborated to Queen Anne style with a clipped gable, iron cornice, and brick corbels.
- The Sniteman Drug store at 528 Hewett is a striking brick Italianate building with metal cornice - the tallest on the block. Charles C. Sniteman was a New Yorker who trained at the Philadelphia College of Pharmacy. He came to Neillsville in 1879 to manage the Henry Meyer Drug Store and bought it in 1891. In 1895 he added the second story to a previous building and redid the front, producing the building we see today. Sniteman invented a fly spray used by farmers and a "blue ointment used in lumber camps to repel lice."
- The Commercial State Bank at 534 Hewett was built of red brick in 1887 and housed a dry goods and grocery store. In 1917 the Commercial State Bank remodeled the facade into a more dignified Classical Revival style, with a central opening framed in limestone blocks. The opening originally contained multipaned windows and decorative panels; today the upper part has been filled with wood.
- The Neillsville Bank at 538 Hewett was built in 1887 as a red brick general store with a corner entrance, and was known as the Gates Block. In 1909 the bank remodeled the exterior to Commercial Prairie Style, covering it with tan brick and limestone trim and moving the entrance to the middle of the east side.

Around the corner behind the Neillsville Bank, at 118 W 6th Street is the Varieties Store, built in 1886. It has simple Commercial Italianate details and a coal chute on the front.

Returning up the east side of Hewett Street:

- The Mark Kappelan Block at 551 Hewett was built in 1893, housing a drug store which faced onto Hewett Street, a barber shop behind that, and a saloon in back. Squarish arches in the brick frame the second story windows. In 1897 the building was refaced and decorated with the iron cornice and window treatments.
- Emery Bruley's Men's Clothing Store at 541 Hewett was built in 1882 in Commercial Italianate style. Bruley was a Canadian who started a blacksmith shop in Neillsville, then opened a clothes store. This building initially housed Bruley's clothing store, a cigar store, a saloon at street level and a cigar factory on the second floor. Bruley also invented the Bruley steel fence post and built the north half of what is now called the Tufts Mansion at 26 Hewett in 1885.
- The Republican Press at 531 Hewett is another Commercial Italianate building with cornice, built in 1895. It served as post office.
- The Dewhurst Block at 521 Hewett is another red brick Commercial building, this one built in 1891. It housed a general store and in more recent years the Coast to Coast Hardware. It was built by Richard Dewhurst, an attorney, state legislator, and later head of the Neillsville Bank across the street. Dewhurst also added the south half to what is now called the Tufts Mansion.
- Hein & Beaulieu's Dry Goods Store at 517 Hewett, built in 1897, is a Commercial Italianate building with Queen Anne influences and an ornate bracketed cornice.
