= Herman M. and Hanna Hediger House =

Historic house in Wisconsin, United States

- U.S. National Register of Historic Places
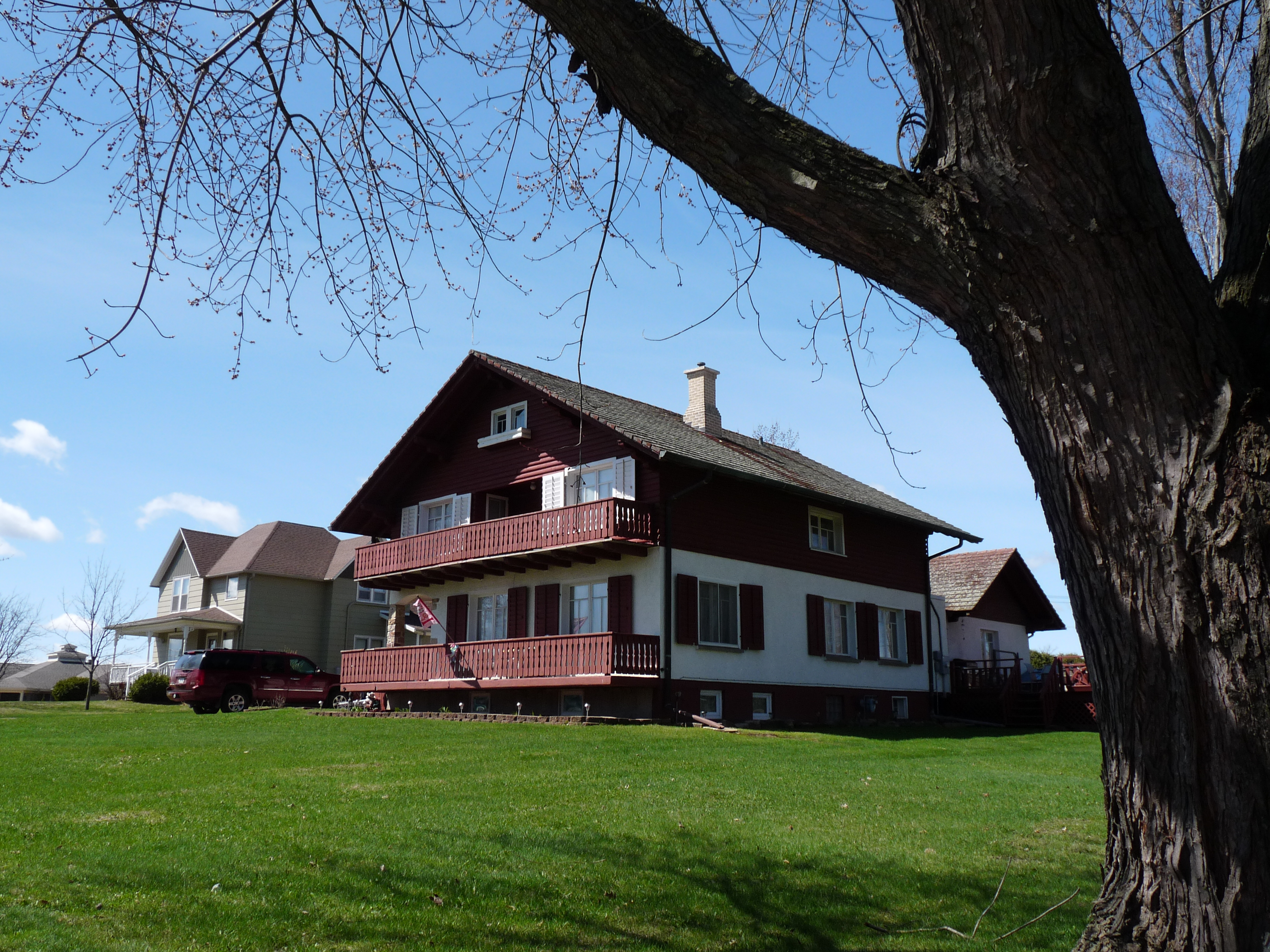
- Herman M. and Hanna Hediger House

- Location within Wisconsin Location within the United States
- Location: 8 Grand Ave. Neillsville, Wisconsin
- Coordinates: 44.5533°N 90.5987°W
- Built: 1949
- Architect: Herman M. Hediger/John Morgenthaler/Hans Haefeli
- Architectural style: Late 19th and 20th Century Revivals
- NRHP reference No.: 13000651
- Added to NRHP: August 27, 2013

The Herman M. and Hanna Hediger House is located in Neillsville, Wisconsin.

== History ==
The Swiss immigrant Hedigers designed this house in the style of a Swiss chalet and brought a cabinet-maker and a mason from Switzerland to help build it. Herman had immigrated around 1921 and worked as a cheesemaker at Christie and Neillsville.

The house was added to both the State and the National Register of Historic Places in 2013.
