= John and Maria Hein House =

Historic house in Wisconsin, United States

- U.S. National Register of Historic Places
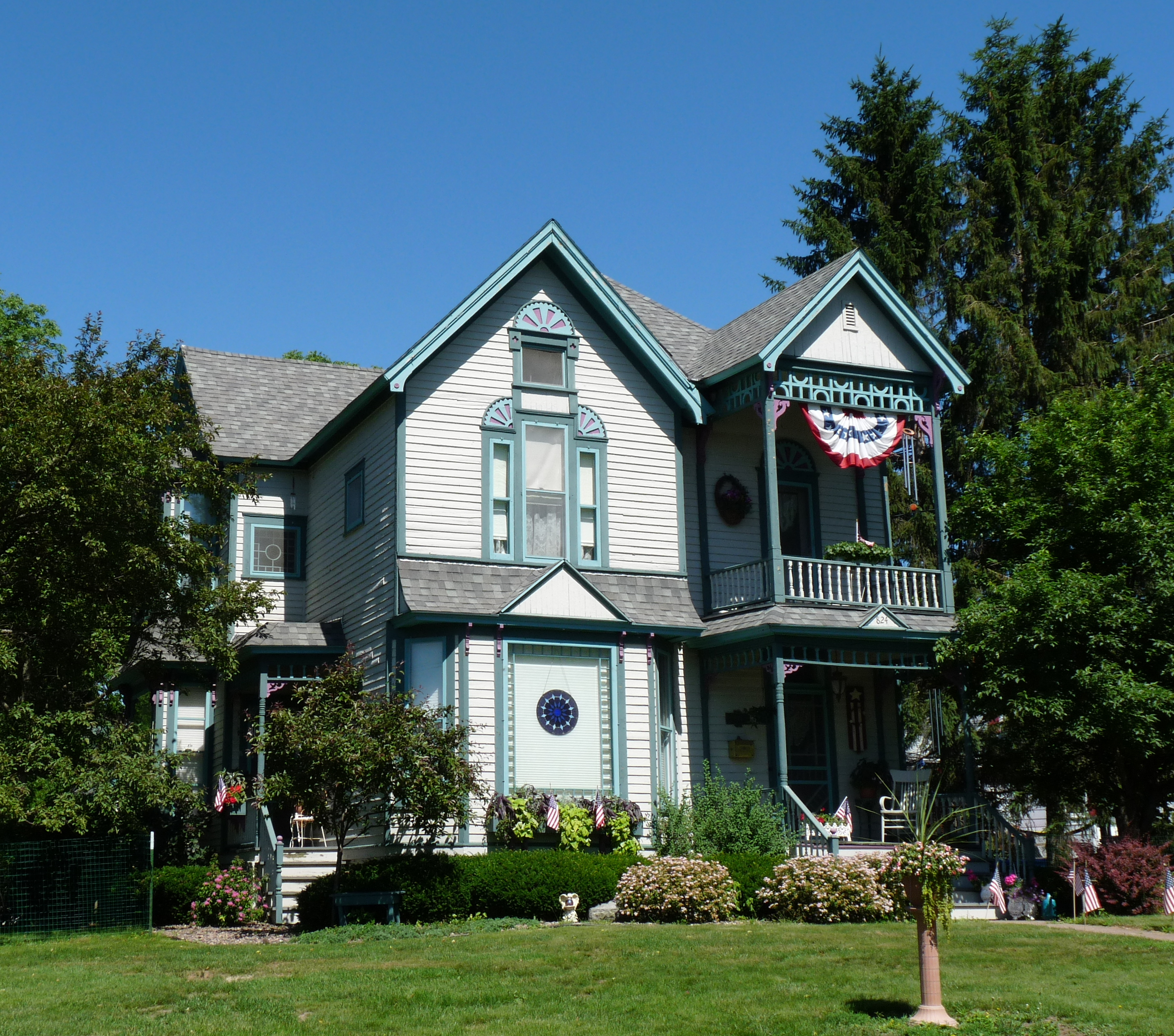
- John and Maria Hein House
- Location: 824 Hewett St., Neillsville, Wisconsin
- Coordinates: 44°33′48″N 90°35′44″W
- Area: 2.5 acres (1.0 ha)
- Built: 1892
- Architectural style: Queen Anne
- NRHP reference No.: 06000277
- Added to NRHP: April 12, 2006

The John and Maria Hein House is located in Neillsville, Wisconsin, USA.

== History ==
The Heins were German immigrants who owned a stave and heading mill and a dry goods and grocery store. The house was added to the State and the National Register of Historic Places in 2006.
