= Neillsville, Wisconsin =

- City
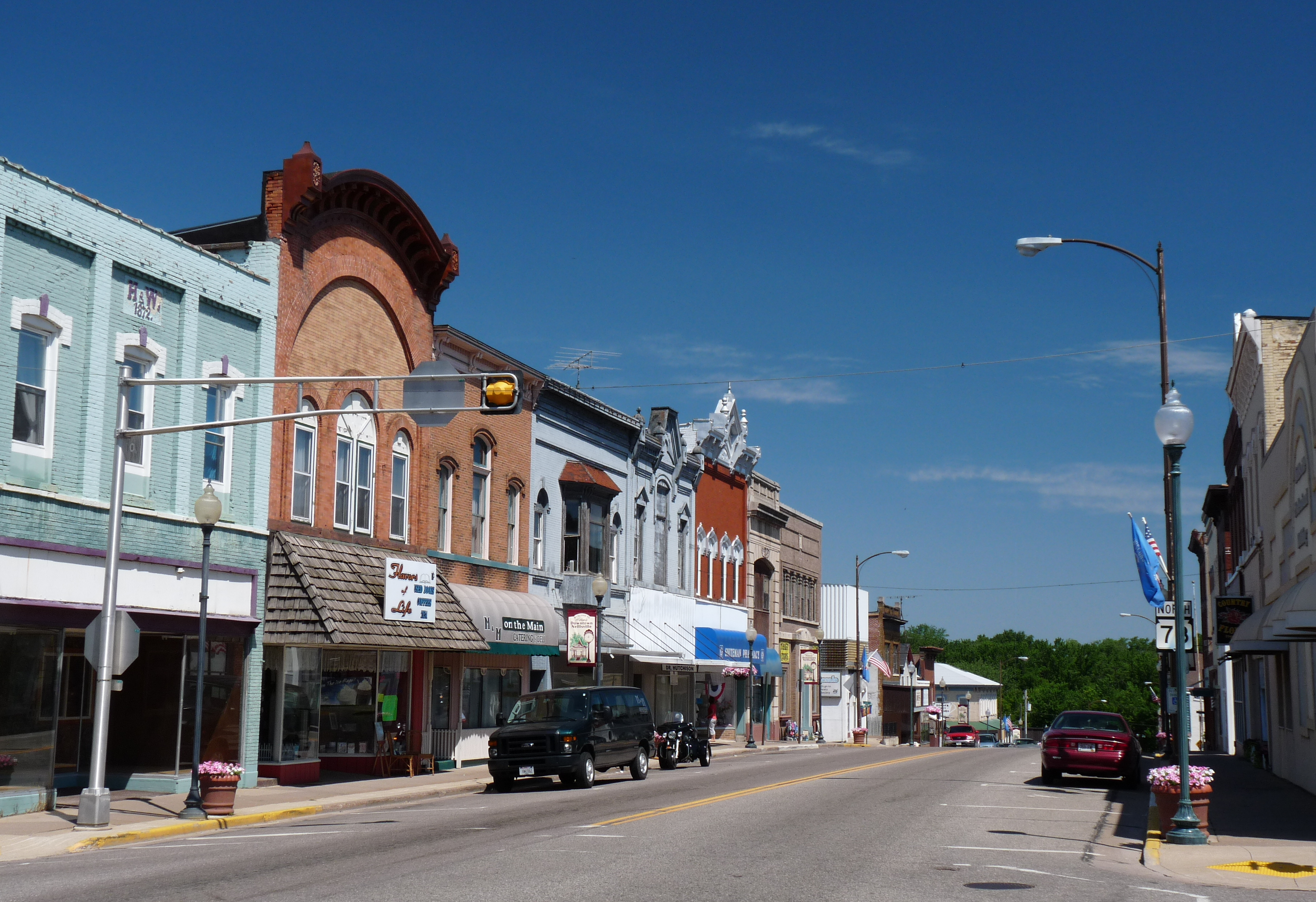
- Neillsville Downtown Historic District

- Location of Neillsville in Clark County, Wisconsin

- Location within Wisconsin Location within the United States
- Coordinates: 44°33′40″N 90°35′45″W
- Country: United States
- State: Wisconsin
- County: Clark

Area
  - Total: 2.85 sq mi (7.37 km^{2})
  - Land: 2.75 sq mi (7.11 km^{2})
  - Water: 0.10 sq mi (0.26 km^{2})
- Elevation: 1,037 ft (316 m)

Population (2020)
  - Total: 2,384
  - Density: 877.7/sq mi (338.89/km^{2})
- Time zone: UTC-6 (Central (CST))
  - Summer (DST): UTC-5 (CDT)
- ZIP Code: 54456
- Area codes: 715 & 534
- FIPS code: 55-55800
- GNIS feature ID: 1570146
- Website: www.neillsville-wi.com

Neillsville is a city in and the county seat of Clark County, Wisconsin, United States. The population was 2,384 at the 2020 census.

== History ==
The Ojibwe were the earliest known residents of the Neillsville area. The first settlers of European descent in the area were James O'Neill and his party, who arrived around 1845, looking for a location to build a sawmill along the Black River. The city was named in honor of O'Neill, as was O'Neill Creek, which runs through the center of the city and drains into the Black River.

In 1854, O’Neill's Mill, as Neillsville was originally called, was selected as the county seat of Clark County. Neillsville was platted on April 14, 1855, and incorporated in April 1882.

A Winnebago Indian boarding school was operated by the Evangelical and Reformed Church on the west side of Neillsville from 1921 to 1957.

Neillsville is where noted architect William L. Steele died. Poor health had forced Steele to retire from architecture in late 1946, leaving his eldest son William L. Steele Jr. and partner Josiah D. Sandham in charge of the practice. Steele had come to Neillsville to live with one of his daughters, Sallie (Mrs. Thomas S. Noble Jr.), and died at her house on March 4, 1949.

== Geography ==
Neillsville is located at 44°33′40″N 90°35′45″W (44.560996, -90.595746).

According to the United States Census Bureau, the city has a total area of 2.87 square miles (7.43 km^{2}), of which 2.77 square miles (7.17 km^{2}) is land and 0.10 square miles (0.26 km^{2}) is water.

The city lies on US Highway 10 and State Trunk Highway 73.

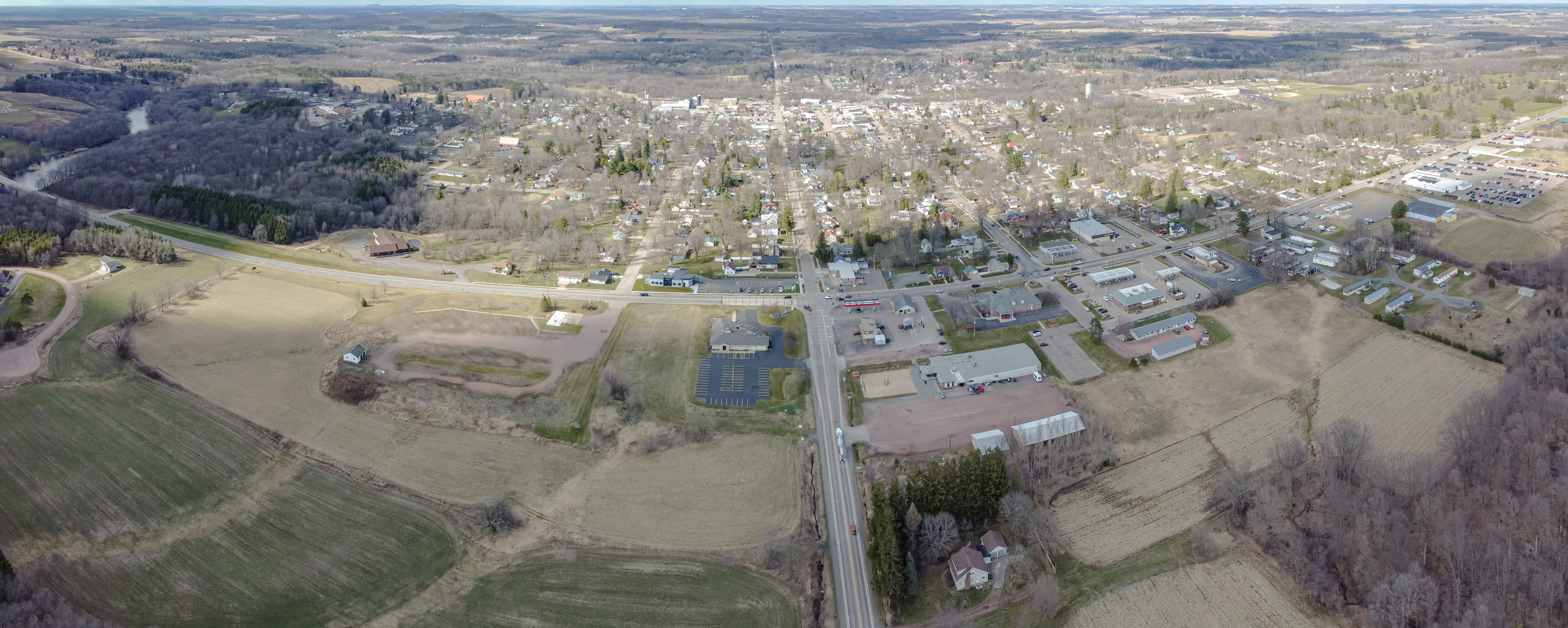

=== Climate ===
Climate data for Neillsville 3ESE, Wisconsin (1991–2020 normals, extremes 1893–present)
| Month | Jan | Feb | Mar | Apr | May | Jun | Jul | Aug | Sep | Oct | Nov | Dec | Year |
|---|---|---|---|---|---|---|---|---|---|---|---|---|---|
| Record high °F (°C) | 57 (14) | 62 (17) | 83 (28) | 91 (33) | 105 (41) | 104 (40) | 106 (41) | 103 (39) | 98 (37) | 92 (33) | 81 (27) | 64 (18) | 106 (41) |
| Mean daily maximum °F (°C) | 23.5 (−4.7) | 28.7 (−1.8) | 41.0 (5.0) | 55.4 (13.0) | 67.8 (19.9) | 76.6 (24.8) | 80.4 (26.9) | 78.2 (25.7) | 70.8 (21.6) | 57.7 (14.3) | 41.9 (5.5) | 28.9 (−1.7) | 54.2 (12.3) |
| Daily mean °F (°C) | 14.4 (−9.8) | 18.4 (−7.6) | 30.4 (−0.9) | 43.6 (6.4) | 55.7 (13.2) | 65.2 (18.4) | 69.0 (20.6) | 66.9 (19.4) | 59.1 (15.1) | 46.8 (8.2) | 33.1 (0.6) | 20.8 (−6.2) | 43.6 (6.4) |
| Mean daily minimum °F (°C) | 5.4 (−14.8) | 8.2 (−13.2) | 19.8 (−6.8) | 31.9 (−0.1) | 43.7 (6.5) | 53.9 (12.2) | 57.6 (14.2) | 55.6 (13.1) | 47.3 (8.5) | 36.0 (2.2) | 24.4 (−4.2) | 12.7 (−10.7) | 33.0 (0.6) |
| Record low °F (°C) | −48 (−44) | −46 (−43) | −39 (−39) | 2 (−17) | 15 (−9) | 22 (−6) | 34 (1) | 31 (−1) | 14 (−10) | 4 (−16) | −16 (−27) | −36 (−38) | −48 (−44) |
| Average precipitation inches (mm) | 1.11 (28) | 1.08 (27) | 1.74 (44) | 3.26 (83) | 4.45 (113) | 5.34 (136) | 3.85 (98) | 4.36 (111) | 4.01 (102) | 3.08 (78) | 1.80 (46) | 1.44 (37) | 35.52 (902) |
| Average snowfall inches (cm) | 9.1 (23) | 9.4 (24) | 7.7 (20) | 2.7 (6.9) | 0.0 (0.0) | 0.0 (0.0) | 0.0 (0.0) | 0.0 (0.0) | 0.0 (0.0) | 0.4 (1.0) | 3.4 (8.6) | 10.9 (28) | 43.6 (111) |
| Average precipitation days (≥ 0.01 in) | 7.4 | 6.3 | 7.8 | 10.6 | 12.3 | 12.5 | 10.0 | 10.4 | 10.1 | 9.3 | 6.9 | 7.9 | 111.5 |
| Average snowy days (≥ 0.1 in) | 5.8 | 5.0 | 3.3 | 1.5 | 0.0 | 0.0 | 0.0 | 0.0 | 0.0 | 0.3 | 2.0 | 5.6 | 23.5 |
Source: NOAA

== Demographics ==
Historical population
| Census | Pop. | Note | %± |
|---|---|---|---|
| 1880 | 1,050 | | — |
| 1890 | 1,936 | | 84.4% |
| 1900 | 2,104 | | 8.7% |
| 1910 | 1,957 | | −7.0% |
| 1920 | 2,160 | | 10.4% |
| 1930 | 2,118 | | −1.9% |
| 1940 | 2,562 | | 21.0% |
| 1950 | 2,663 | | 3.9% |
| 1960 | 2,728 | | 2.4% |
| 1970 | 2,750 | | 0.8% |
| 1980 | 2,780 | | 1.1% |
| 1990 | 2,680 | | −3.6% |
| 2000 | 2,731 | | 1.9% |
| 2010 | 2,463 | | −9.8% |
| 2020 | 2,384 | | −3.2% |
U.S. Decennial Census

=== 2010 census ===
As of the census of 2010, there were 2,463 people, 1,095 households, and 586 families living in the city. The population density was 889.2 inhabitants per square mile (343.3/km^{2}). There were 1,230 housing units at an average density of 444.0 per square mile (171.4/km^{2}). The racial makeup of the city was 96.2% White, 0.4% African American, 0.7% Native American, 1.1% Asian, 0.9% from other races, and 0.7% from two or more races. Hispanic or Latino of any race were 2.3% of the population.

There were 1,095 households, of which 24.7% had children under the age of 18 living with them, 39.1% were married couples living together, 10.5% had a female householder with no husband present, 3.9% had a male householder with no wife present, and 46.5% were non-families. 42.3% of all households were made up of individuals, and 22.8% had someone living alone who was 65 years of age or older. The average household size was 2.13 and the average family size was 2.92.

The median age in the city was 43.6 years. 21.8% of residents were under the age of 18; 8.5% were between the ages of 18 and 24; 21.3% were from 25 to 44; 24.7% were from 45 to 64; and 23.7% were 65 years of age or older. The gender makeup of the city was 46.6% male and 53.4% female.

=== 2000 census ===
As of the census of 2000, there were 2,731 people, 1,130 households, and 653 families living in the city. The population density was 975.3 people per square mile (376.6/km^{2}). There were 1,200 housing units at an average density of 428.5 per square mile (165.5/km^{2}). The racial makeup of the city was 96.78% White, 0.15% African American, 1.10% Native American, 1.24% Asian, 0.04% Pacific Islander, 0.26% from other races, and 0.44% from two or more races. Hispanic or Latino of any race were 0.95% of the population.

There were 1,130 households, out of which 27.1% had children under the age of 18 living with them, 44.5% were married couples living together, 10.1% had a female householder with no husband present, and 42.2% were non-families. 38.1% of all households were made up of individuals, and 21.3% had someone living alone who was 65 years of age or older. The average household size was 2.24 and the average family size was 2.99.

In the city, the population was spread out, with 25.3% under the age of 18, 7.0% from 18 to 24, 24.2% from 25 to 44, 18.7% from 45 to 64, and 24.8% who were 65 years of age or older. The median age was 40 years. For every 100 females, there were 86.2 males. For every 100 females age 18 and over, there were 79.3 males.

The median income for a household in the city was $29,969, and the median income for a family was $41,076. Males had a median income of $30,523 versus $20,379 for females. The per capita income for the city was $16,298. About 6.3% of families and 10.3% of the population were below the poverty line, including 6.8% of those under age 18 and 8.9% of those age 65 or over.

== Transportation ==
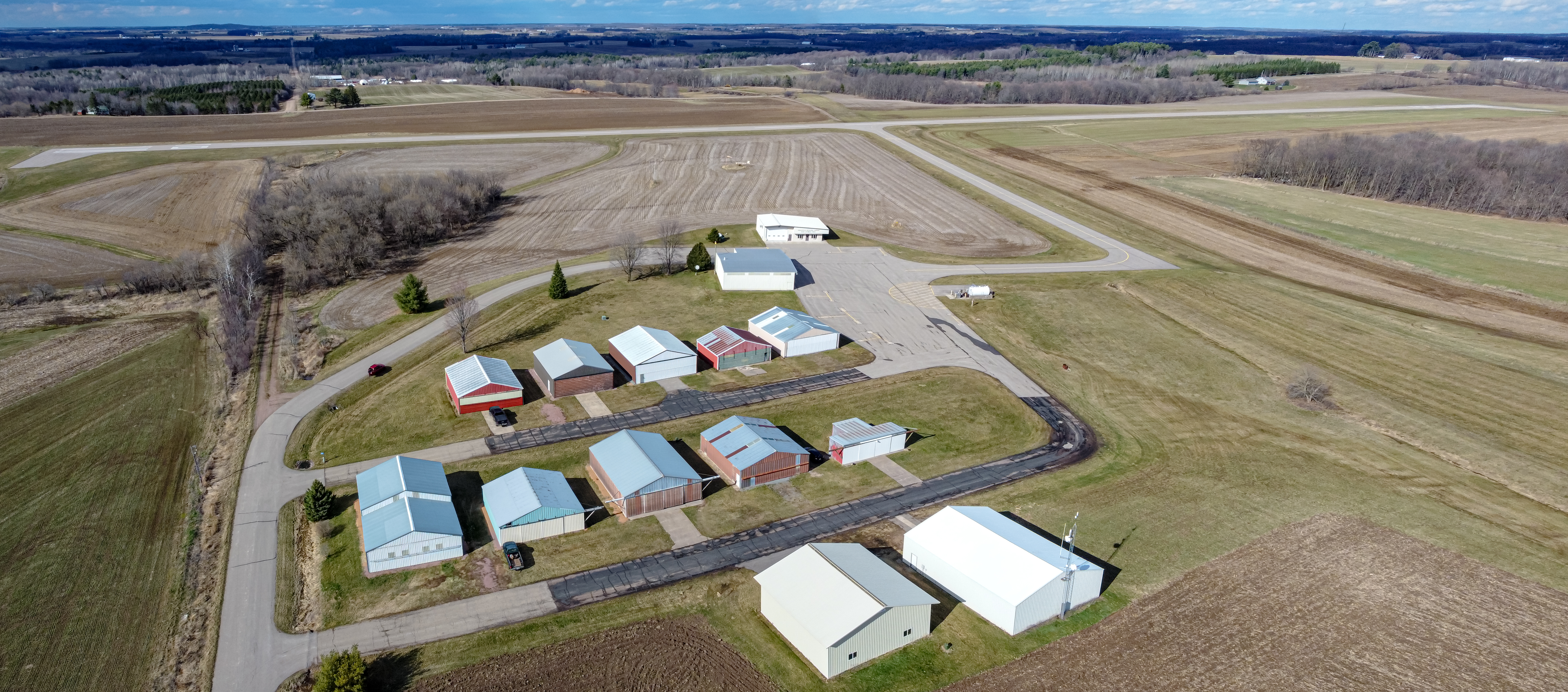
Neillsville airport

Neillsville is served by the Neillsville Municipal Airport (KVIQ).

== Education ==
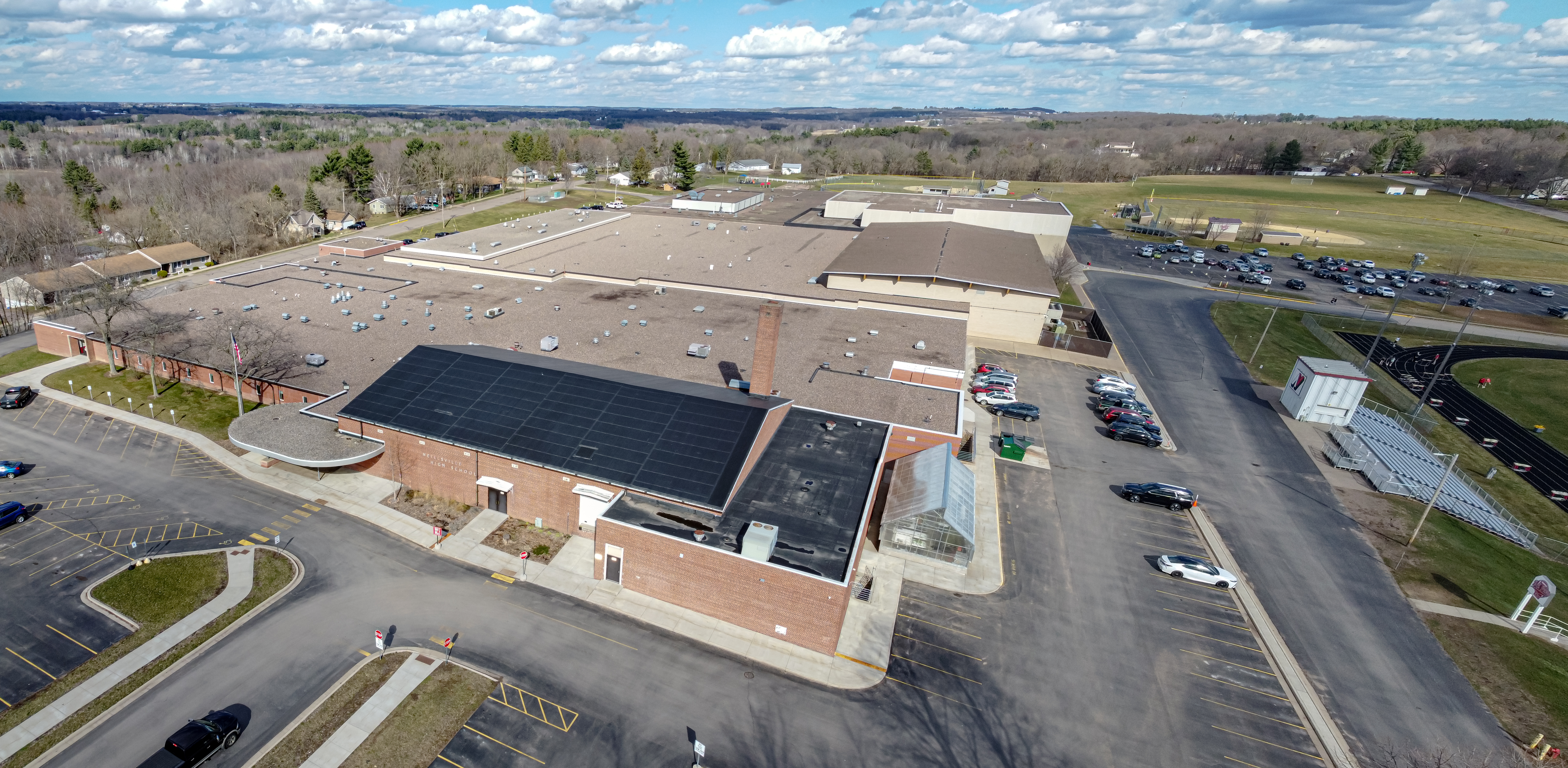
Neillsville High School

Neillsville has a public K-12 school system, consisting of Neillsville Elementary School, Neillsville Middle School, and Neillsville High School, whose mascot is the Neillsville Warriors. Neillsville is also home to St. John's Lutheran School, a private school for grades K-8 of the Wisconsin Evangelical Lutheran Synod, and the former home of St. Mary's School of Neillsville, a Catholic school which closed in 1972.

In addition, the Chippewa Valley Technical College has a regional center in Neillsville, which offers GED, associate's degree, and continuing education classes.

== Points of interest ==
The High Ground is a veterans' memorial park located west of Neillsville. Originally a memorial to Vietnam War veterans, it now includes memorials to World War I, World War II, and Korean War veterans.

The Clark County Jail, now a museum, and the Reed School, now a museum, are on the National Register of Historic Places.

The Wisconsin Pavilion from the 1964 New York World's Fair was moved to Neillsville at the conclusion of the Fair. The building is now home to local radio station WCCN/WCCN-FM and a gift shop. Chatty-Belle is a large cow statue located on the ground of the Wisconsin Pavilion. She has the distinction of being the World's Largest Talking Cow.

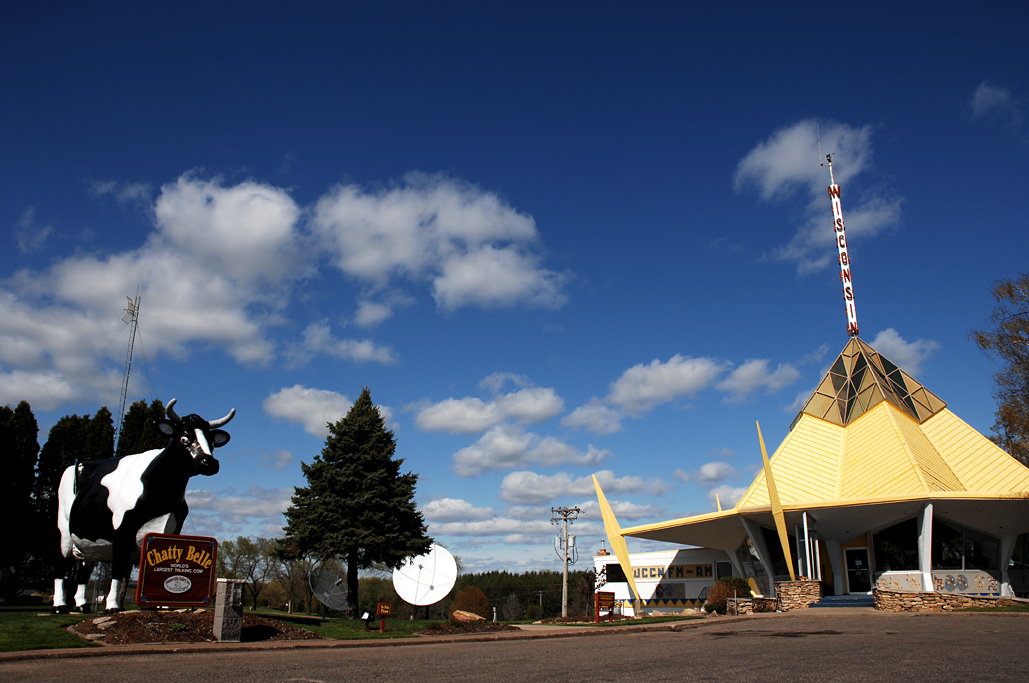
The Wisconsin Pavilion, Wisconsin's 1964 World's Fair exhibit

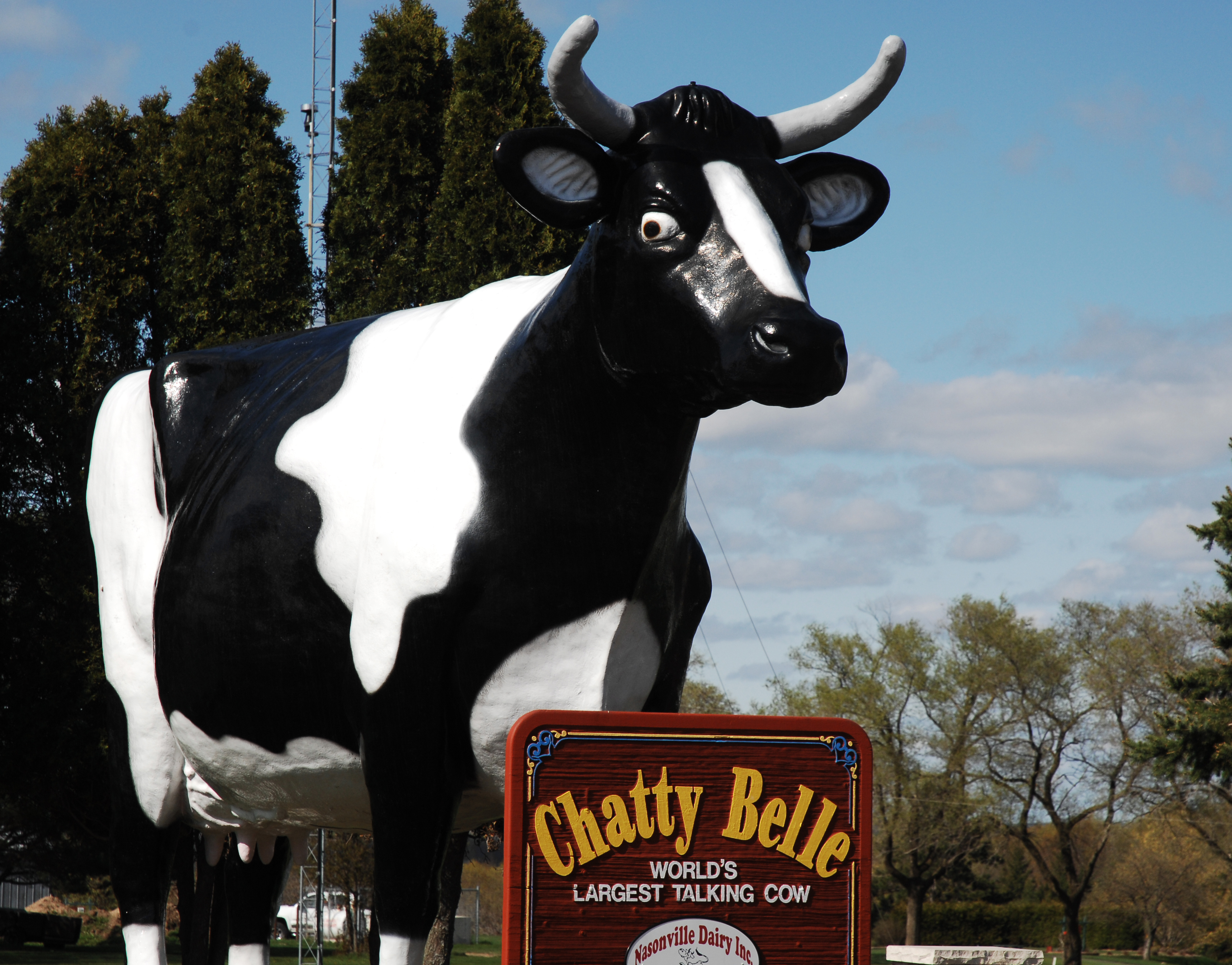
Chatty Belle, the world's largest talking cow, part of the Wisconsin Pavilion

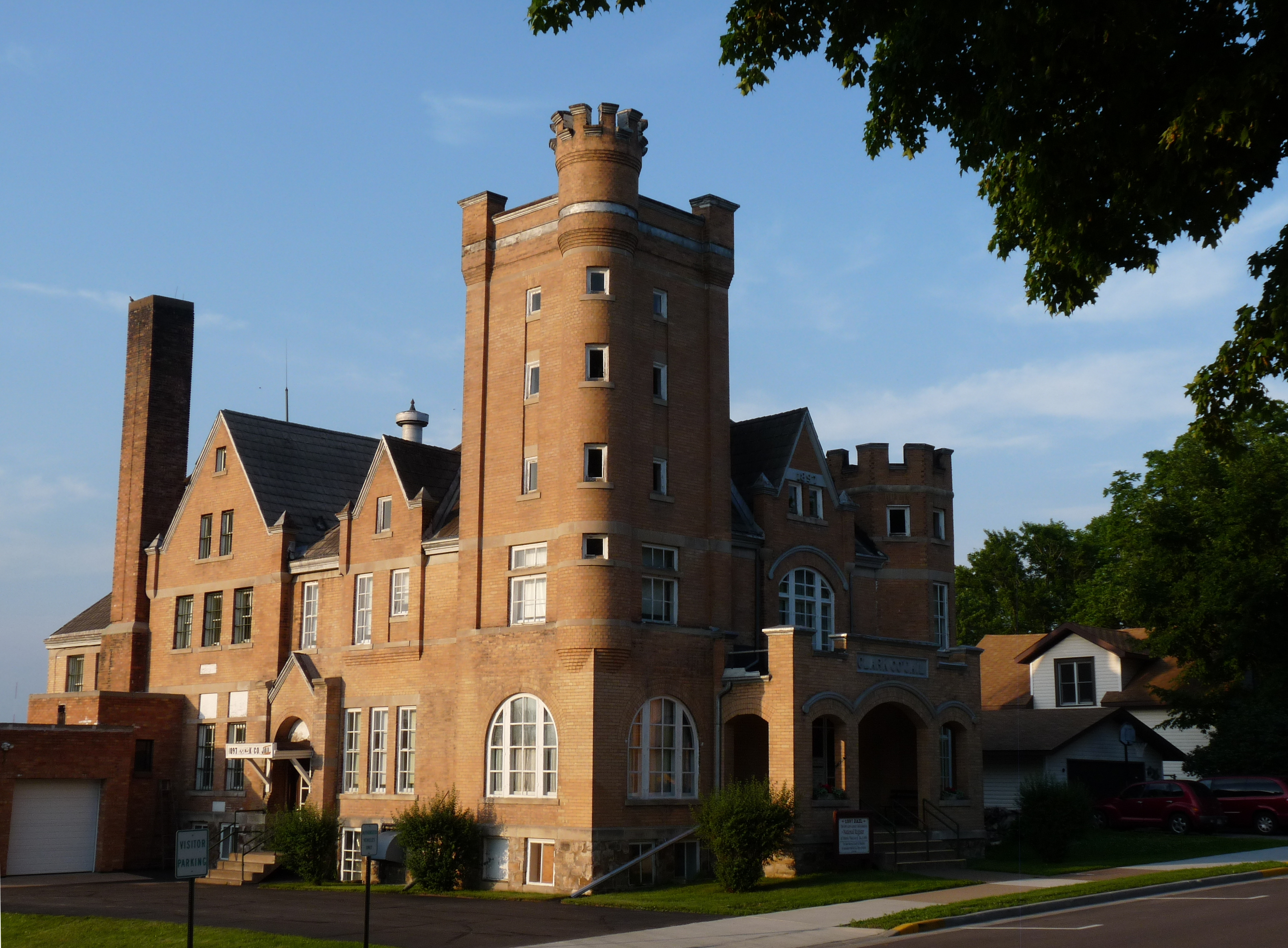
The old Clark County Jail, built in 1897 and now a historical museum

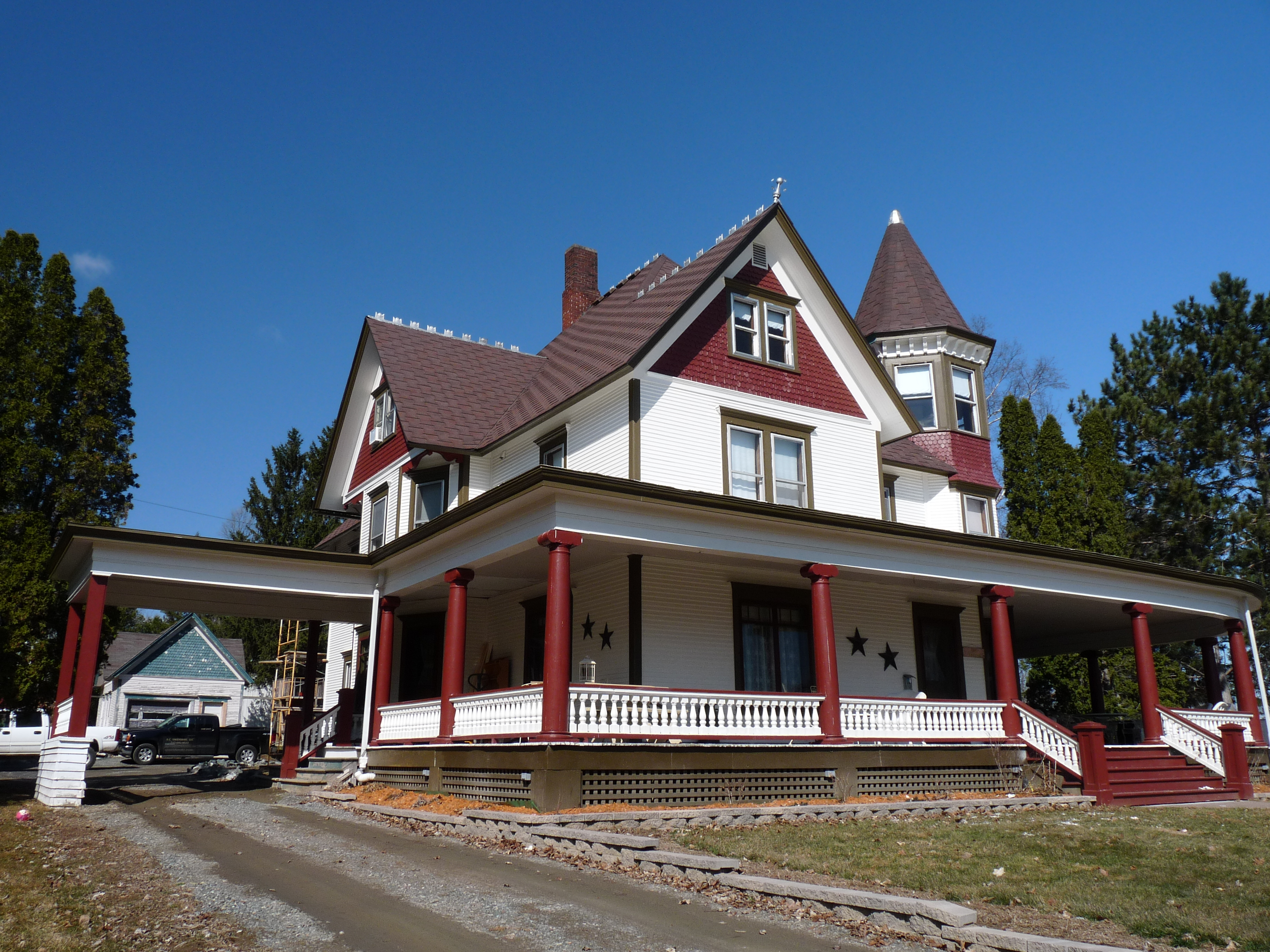
Charles and Theresa Cornelius House

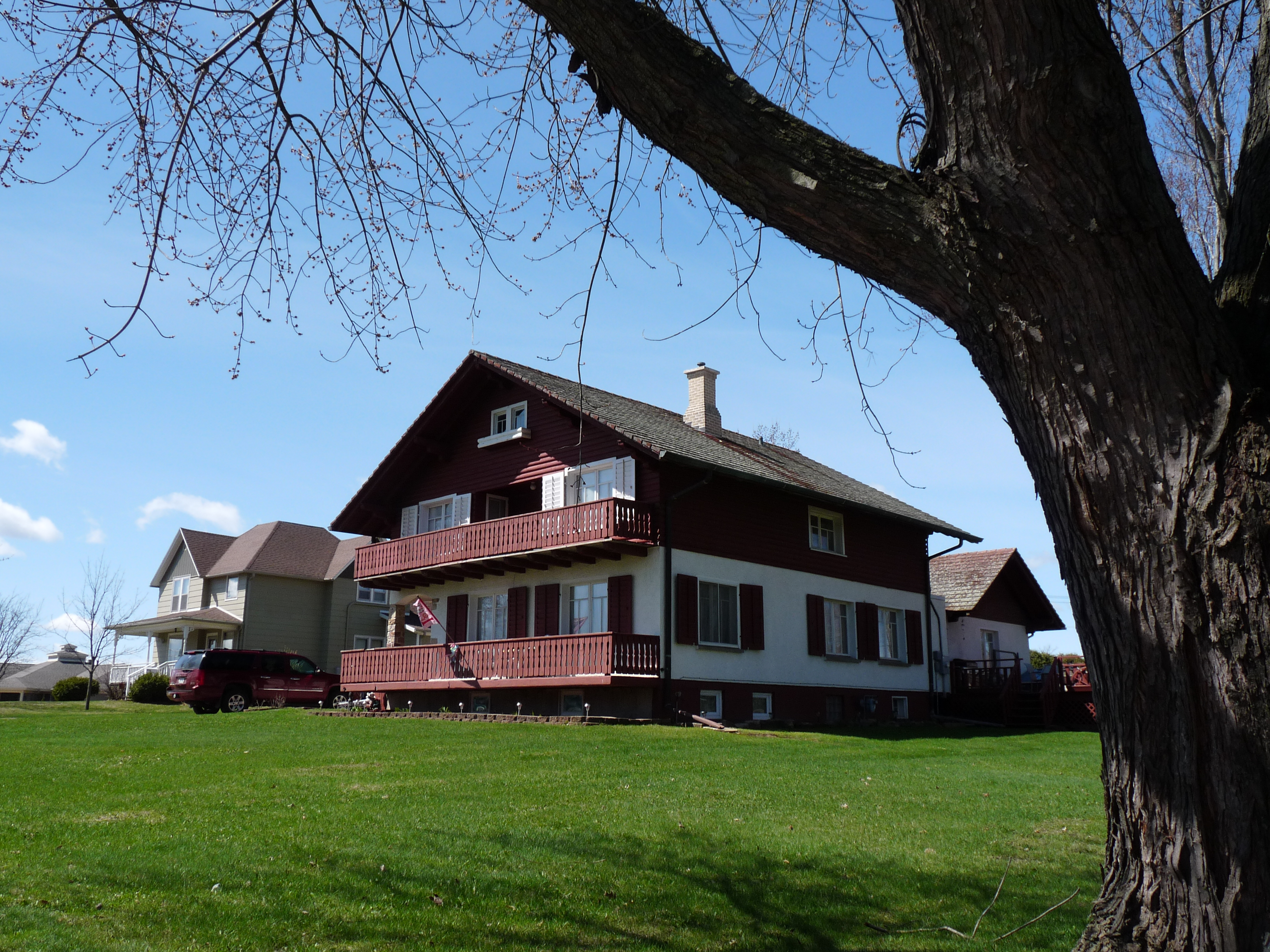
Herman M. and Hanna Hediger House

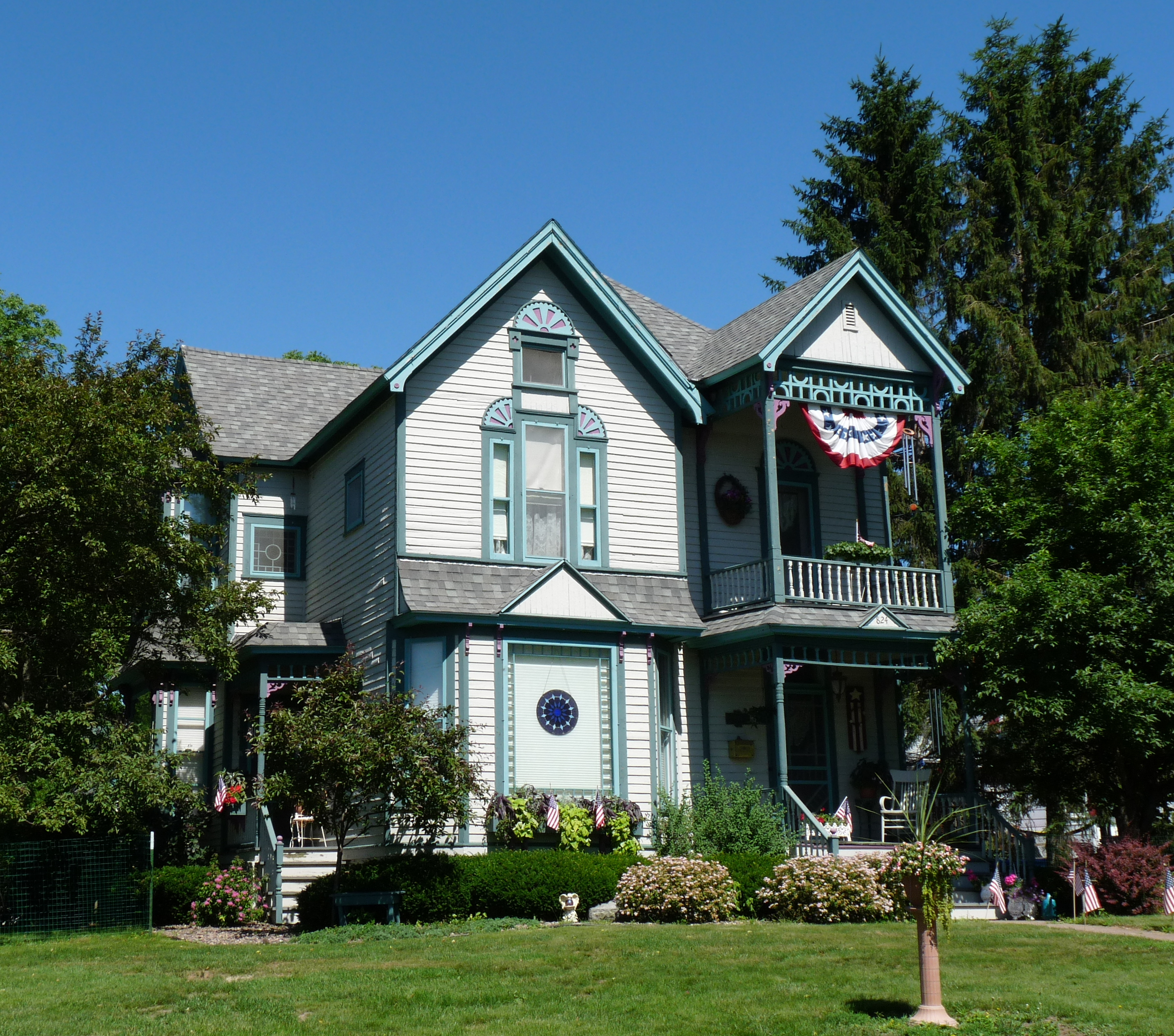
John and Maria Hein House

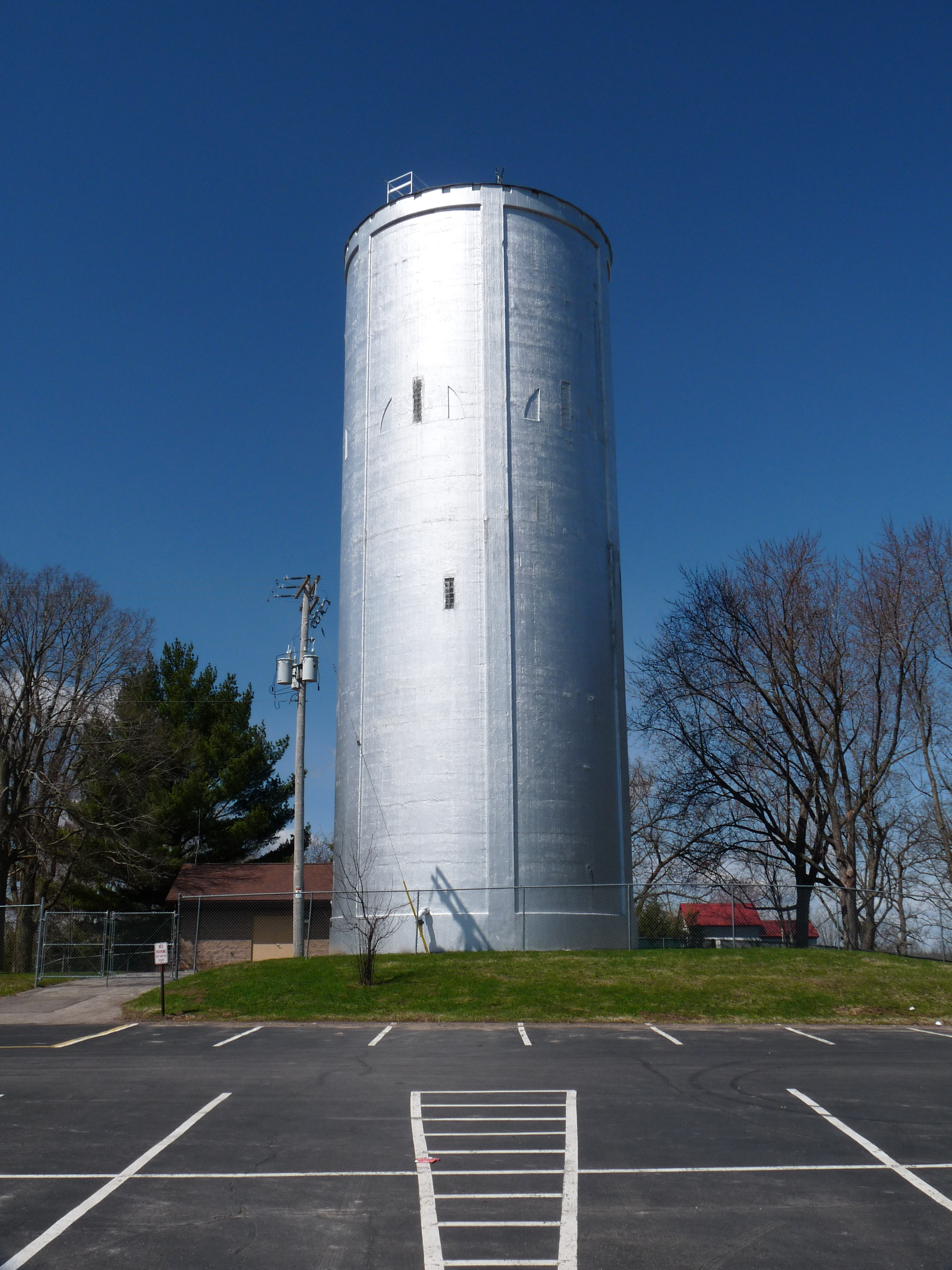
Neillsville Standpipe

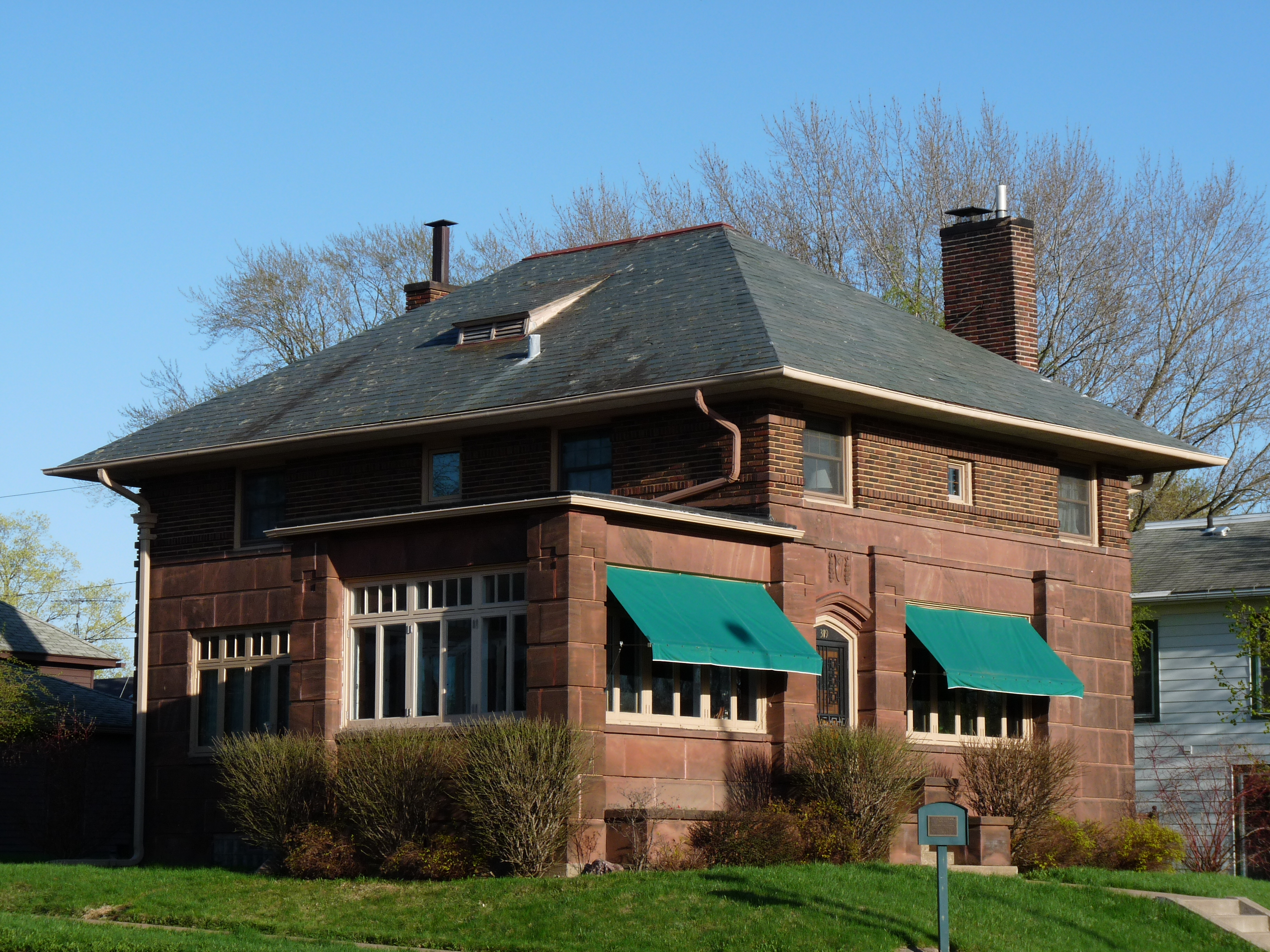
Charles C. and Katharyn Sniteman House

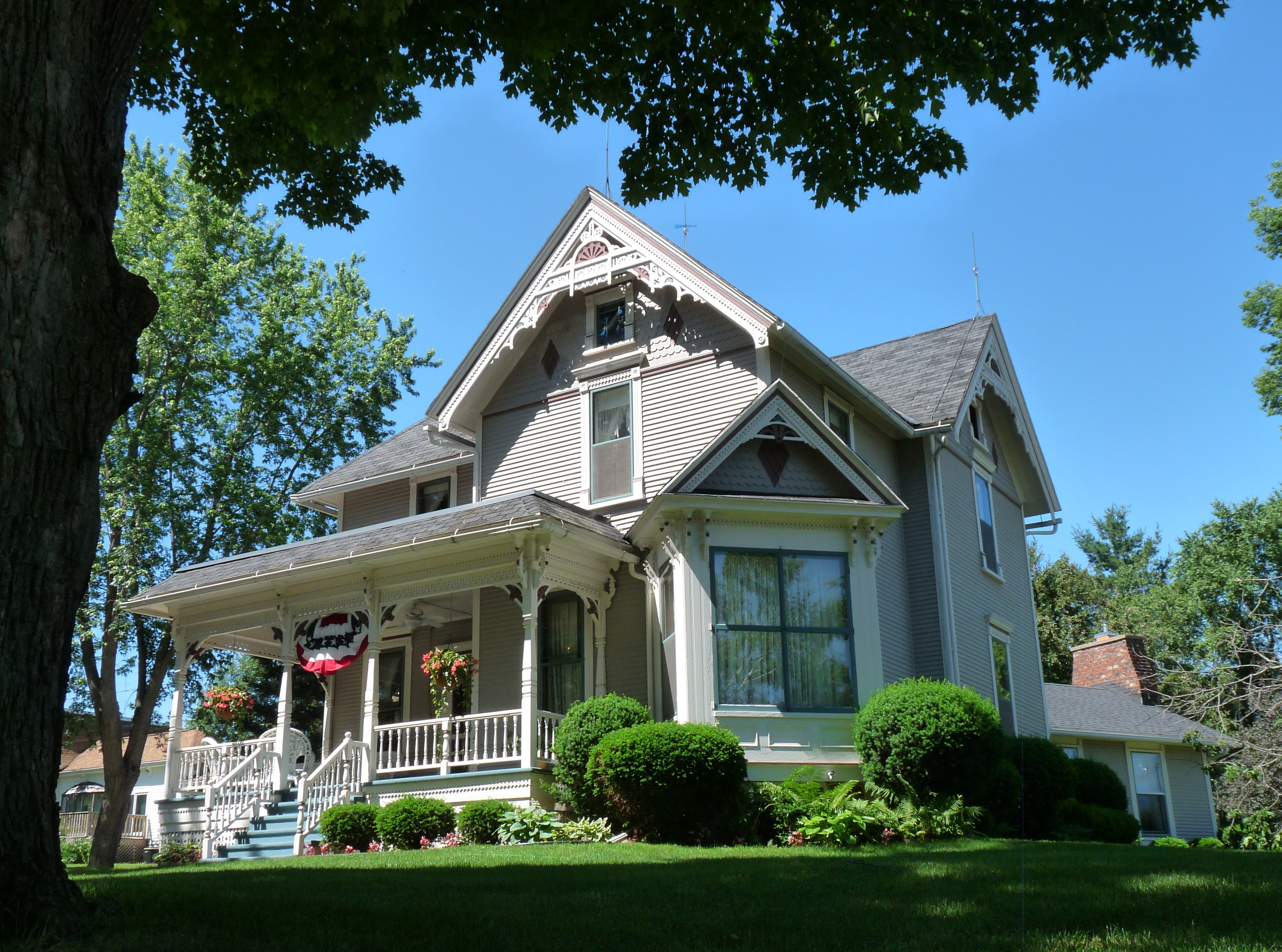
George W. and Sarah Trogner House

== See also ==
- National Register of Historic Places in Clark County, Wisconsin
