= 1964 New York World's Fair =

World's fair held in New York City

1964–1965 New York
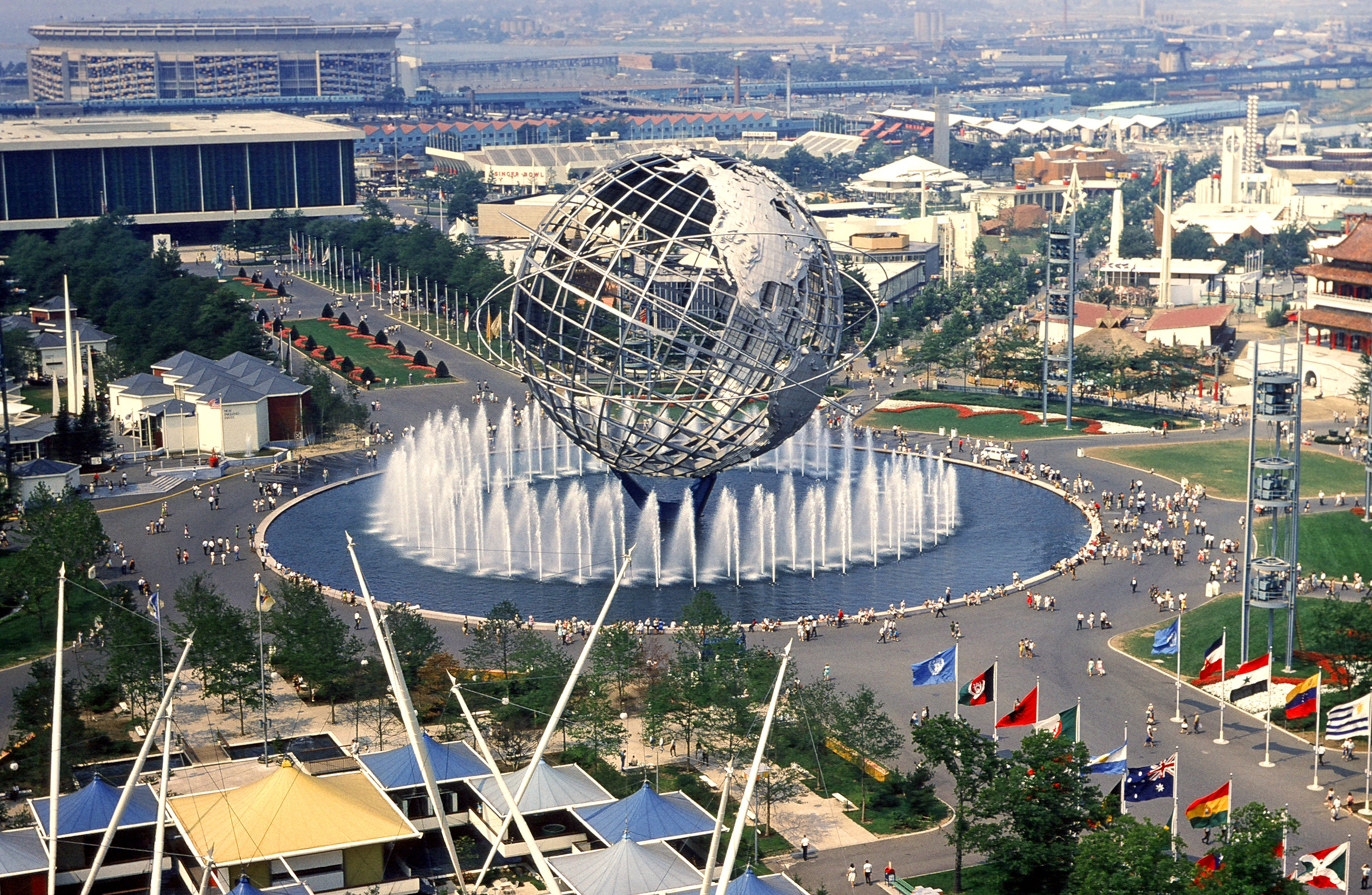
- The Unisphere (center) and United States Pavilion (left background), viewed from the observation towers of the New York State Pavilion

Overview
- BIE-class: Unrecognized exposition
- Name: 1964 New York World's Fair
- Motto: Peace through Understanding
- Building(s): Unisphere, 139 pavilions, 34 concessions
- Area: 646 acres (2.61 km^{2})
- Visitors: 51,607,448
- Organized by: Robert Moses

Participant(s)
- Countries: 66 (80 including nations without full exhibits)
- Business: Nearly 350 companies

Location
- Country: United States
- City: New York
- Venue: Flushing Meadows–Corona Park

Timeline
- Bidding: 1959
- Awarded: N/A
- Opening: April 22, 1964 (first season); April 21, 1965 (second season)
- Closure: October 18, 1964 (first season); October 17, 1965 (second season)

Universal
- Previous: Century 21 Exposition in Seattle
- Next: Expo 67 in Montreal

Internet
- Website: www.nywf64.com www.worldsfairphotos.com

The 1964 New York World's Fair (also known as the 1964–1965 New York World's Fair) was an international exposition at Flushing Meadows–Corona Park in Queens, New York City, United States. The fair included exhibitions, activities, performances, films, art, and food presented by 80 nations, 24 U.S. states, and nearly 350 American companies. The five sections of the 646-acre (261 ha) fairground were the Federal and State, International, Transportation, Lake Amusement, and Industrial areas. The fair's theme was "Peace through Understanding", and its symbol was the Unisphere, a stainless-steel model of Earth. Initially, the fair had 139 pavilions, and 34 concessions and shows.

The site had previously hosted the 1939 New York World's Fair. In the 1950s, several businessmen devised plans for a similar event in 1964, and the New York World's Fair 1964 Corporation (WFC) was formed in 1959. Although U.S. president Dwight D. Eisenhower approved the fair, the Bureau International des Expositions refused to grant it formal recognition. Construction began in late 1960, and over 100 exhibitors signed up for the fair over the next three years. The fair ran for two six-month seasons from April 22 to October 18, 1964, and from April 21 to October 17, 1965. Despite initial projections of 70 million visitors, just over 51.6 million attended. After the fair closed, some pavilions were preserved or relocated, but most of the structures were demolished.

The fair showcased mid-20th-century American culture and technology. The sections were designed in various architectural styles. Anyone could host an exhibit if they could afford to rent the land and pay for a pavilion. There were several amusement and transport rides, various plazas and fountains, and at its peak, 198 restaurants that served dishes such as Belgian waffles, some of which were popularized by the fair. There were more than 30 entertainment events, 40 theaters, and various music performances. Exhibitors displayed sculptures, visual art and artifacts, and consumer products such as electronics and cars. The contemporaneous press criticized the event as a financial failure, although it influenced 21st-century technologies, and popularized consumer products such as the Ford Mustang.

== Development ==
Before European settlement of the area, the site of the 1964 World's Fair, Flushing Meadows–Corona Park in Queens, New York City, was a natural wetland straddling the Flushing River. In the early 20th century, the site was occupied by the Corona Ash Dumps, before it was selected as the site of the 1939–1940 World's Fair. The theme of the 1939–1940 was "the world of tomorrow"; the event was unprofitable, recouping only 32% of its original cost. After the 1939 fair, the site was used as a park, but fell into disrepair due to a lack of funds. The development of the 1964 fair coincided with social upheavals of the early 1960s, including the civil rights movement, Vietnam War protests, and the aftermath of U.S. President John F. Kennedy's assassination.

=== Planning ===
==== World's Fair Corporation ====
The idea for the 1964 fair was conceived by a group of businessmen. Among them was Robert Kopple, a lawyer who first discussed the idea at a family dinner in 1958 before suggesting it at a meeting of the Mutual Admiration Society the following year. The year 1964 was nominally selected to coincide with the 300th anniversary of the British conquest of the Dutch colony of New Netherland. Kopple and two friends, Charles Preusse and Thomas J. Deegan, met with 35 potential financiers at the 21 Club restaurant. New York City mayor Robert F. Wagner Jr. and parks commissioner Robert Moses formally endorsed the proposal in August 1959, and 75 businessmen formed the New York World's Fair 1964 Corporation (WFC) that month. Moses, who saw a 1964 fair as a means to develop the Flushing Meadows site, offered to let the WFC use Flushing Meadows for a nominal fee. The fairground would include the 1939 World's Fair site and a part of the nearby Kissena Corridor Park.

The bid required approval from the United States Congress and the Bureau International des Expositions (BIE), the French organization that was in charge of approving world's fairs. Los Angeles and Washington, D.C., were submitting competing bids, so in October 1959, U.S. president Dwight D. Eisenhower appointed a committee to review the 1964 world's fair bids, and he approved the New York bid later that month. By late 1959, 75 nations had informally indicated an intention to attend the fair, and the WFC began looking for a president and three additional managers in early 1960. Moses was tentatively selected as the WFC's president that March, despite Kopple's objections that Moses was too old. In turn, Moses would not take the job unless Kopple resigned, as the two men had disagreed bitterly over the canceled Mid-Manhattan Elevated Expressway. After Kopple quit the WFC, Moses formally became the WFC's president that May. Moses wanted the fair to run for two years, and consultants for the WFC predicted the fair would have 70 million visitors during that time.

Moses traveled to Paris to ask for the BIE's recognition of the fair. The BIE allowed the WFC to begin planning the fair in November 1959, but its officials decided to not formally recognize the fair. Under BIE rules, world's fairs could run for only one six-month period, though the WFC had tried to request an exemption. The New York fair would also charge rent to foreign governments, contravening another BIE rule that prevented rent from being charged to exhibitors. In addition, the BIE allowed only one exposition per country every ten years. These rules were not immutable; for example, the BIE had recognized the 1939 fair, even though the previous exposition had run for two seasons. Moses refused to negotiate with BIE officials and treated them derisively, belittling the BIE as a "bunch of clowns in Paris". Due to Moses' behavior, the BIE instead decided to approve the 1962 Seattle World's Fair, and directed its members to not host official exhibits at the 1964 New York World's Fair.

==== Financing and initial exhibitors ====
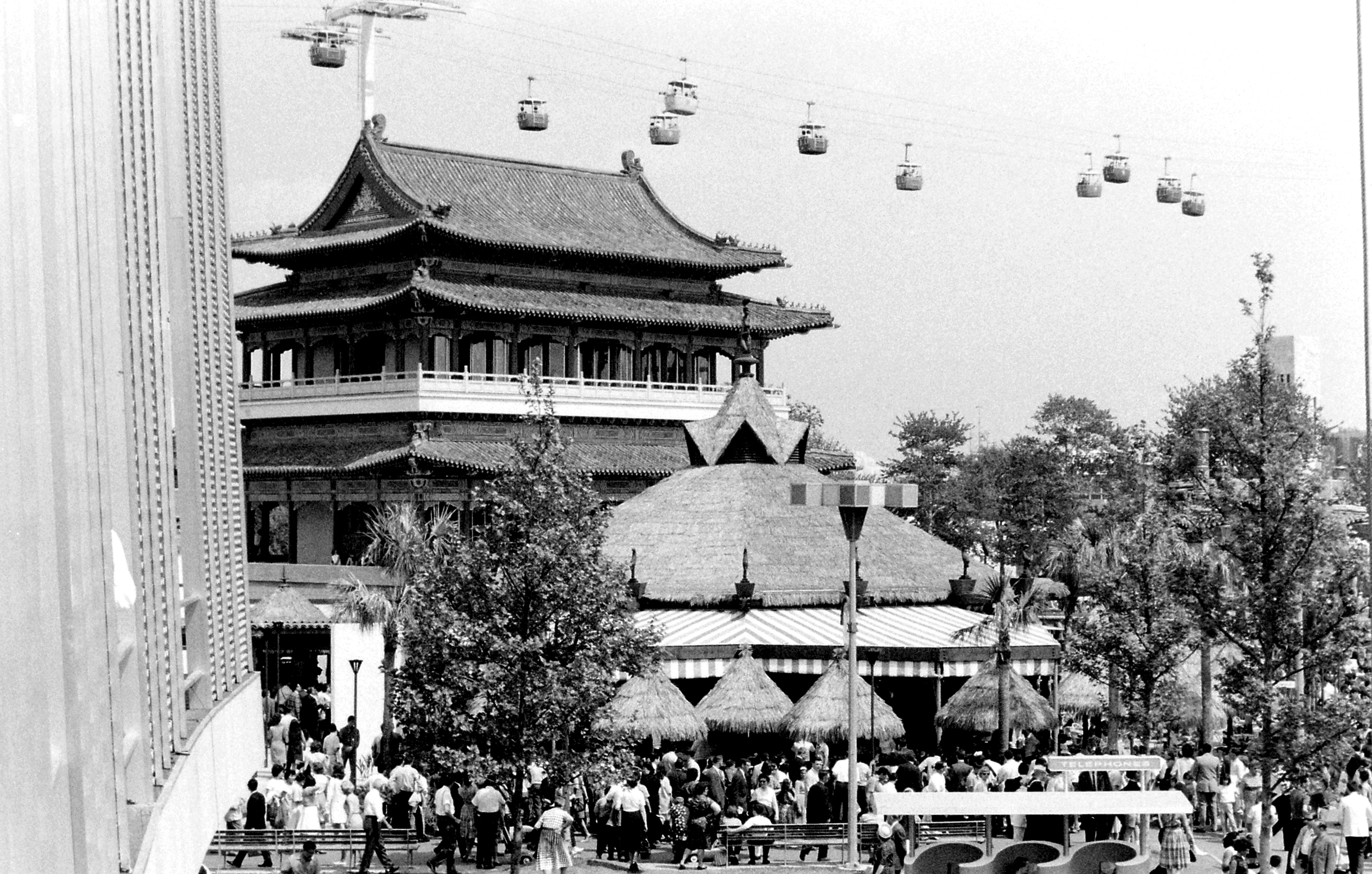
Republic of China and Caribbean pavilions taken from the Mexico pavilion

The WFC planned to issue $500 million in bonds, a figure that was later decreased to $150 million. Moses said the 1964 fair would be a "billion-dollar" event, though this included expenses for related projects such as roads and the nearby Shea Stadium. The WFC leased about 646 acres (261 ha) from the city government in May 1960. Moses hired the former lieutenant governor Charles Poletti and the military engineer William Everett Potter to organize the exhibits. A design committee proposed a massive, doughnut-shaped pavilion; Moses rejected the plan and the design committee was forced out by the end of 1959. Moses did not devise a master plan for the fair; he wanted to save the WFC money by having exhibitors erect most of their own pavilions, The city government implemented a building code and health code, which Potter enforced. Nearly all of the buildings were to be temporary structures.

The 1964 fair was to be themed "peace through understanding". WFC member Jerome Weinstein suggested the motto, which was inspired by an ideal Kopple had wanted for his daughters. According to Moses, the fair was intended "to assist in educating the peoples of the world as to the interdependence of nations and the need for universal lasting peace". Exhibits were to be divided into five areas, including a transportation area the Port of New York Authority would operate. The original plans called for an amusement park area, which was canceled after the WFC failed to find an operator. By August 1960, the first ten exhibitors had applied for space at the fair, and architectural blueprints for the fair's first pavilion had been submitted. The WFC began sending delegations abroad to invite foreign governments to the fair.

In late 1960, the group began issuing $67.5 million in promissory notes to fund construction; the WFC later reduced the amount to $64 million, consisting of $40 million in notes plus $24 million from the city. The WFC's finance chairman predicted the fair would earn over $200 million. By the end of 1960, seven countries had agreed to sponsor exhibits. and one-third of the industrial pavilion sites had been leased. Early in 1961, Moses announced the Unisphere would be built as the fair's symbol, and the WFC also hired the detective agency Pinkerton to provide security and first-aid services. A report published that January said the fair itself would cost $768 million, although individual exhibitors would pay much of the cost.

=== Construction ===
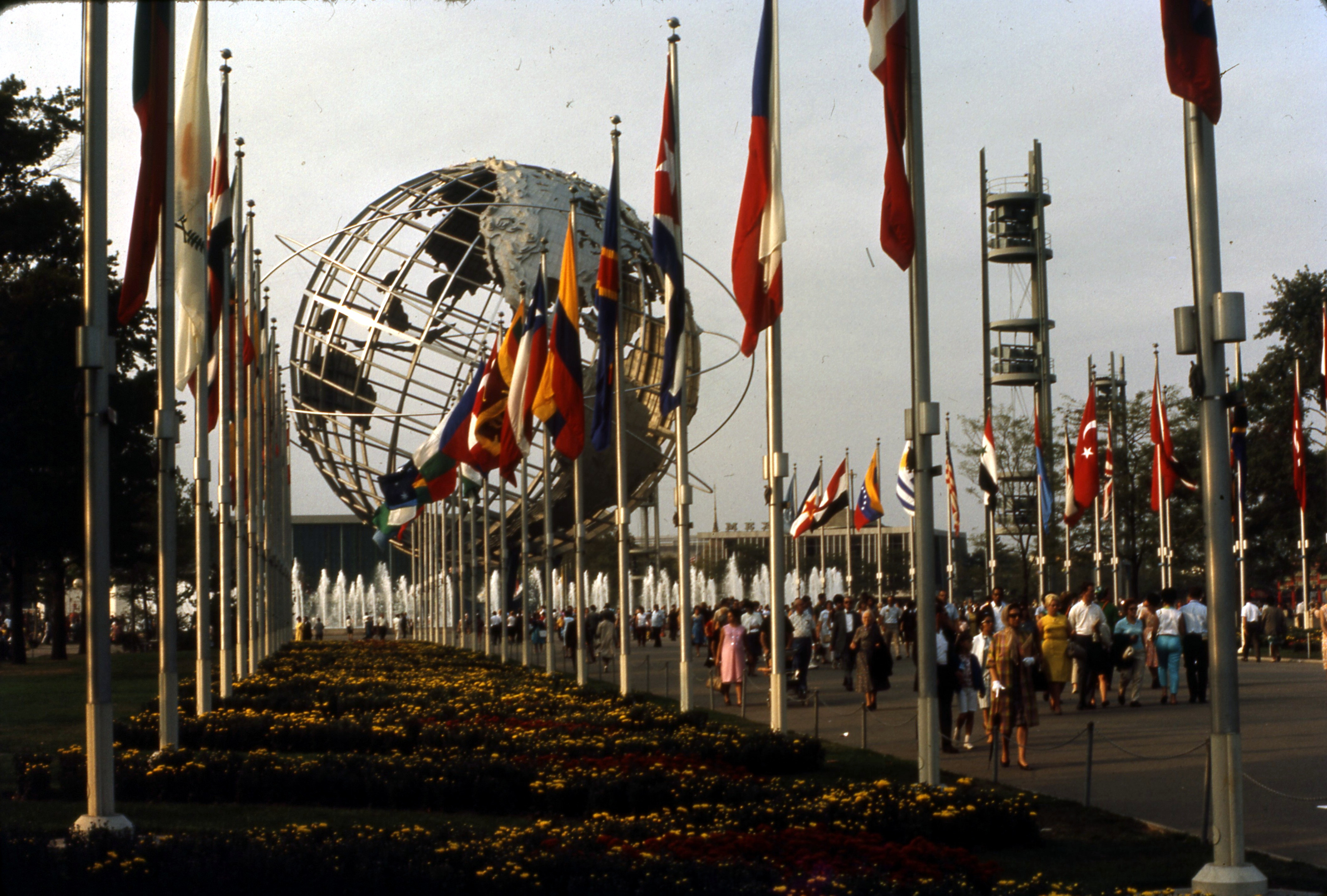
The Unisphere was selected as the fair's symbol in early 1961.

Exhibitors designed their own pavilions and construction contractors hired members of local labor unions to build the structures. Wagner predicted 10,000 people would be employed during construction. The WFC hosted "preview days" where selected guests could view the construction. The Travelers Companies built information centers across the U.S. to promote the fair, and local chapters of the Elks, Kiwanis, and Rotary clubs promoted the fair nationwide. The WFC issued collectible medallions in bronze and silver that were manufactured by Medallic Art Company. Commemorative postage stamps were issued to celebrate the fair, both inside and outside the U.S. Some New York license plates also bore slogans advertising the fair. Several hotels were built nearby to accommodate fair visitors, and public transit and roads linking the venue were also upgraded. The WFC opened an information office to answer visitors' questions. Private businesses promoted their products for the fair, and discounted tickets were sold in advance of the opening.

==== 1961 and 1962 ====
William Whipple Jr., the fair's chief engineer, said in September 1960 exhibitors would be able to begin erecting pavilions by 1962. Construction of the first building, an administration structure, began in August 1960 and was finished in January 1961. In early 1961, almost all of Flushing Meadows–Corona Park was closed to allow the fair's construction, and the Long Island Rail Road's (LIRR) World's Fair station opened. Workers moved trees and diverted parts of the Flushing River into tunnels. By April 1961, thirty-four countries had accepted invitations to the fair, and the city agreed to spend $24 million improving the park. Moses secretly obtained additional funds from the city government; according to Moses's biographer Robert Caro, the city government may have spent as much as $60 million on the fair.

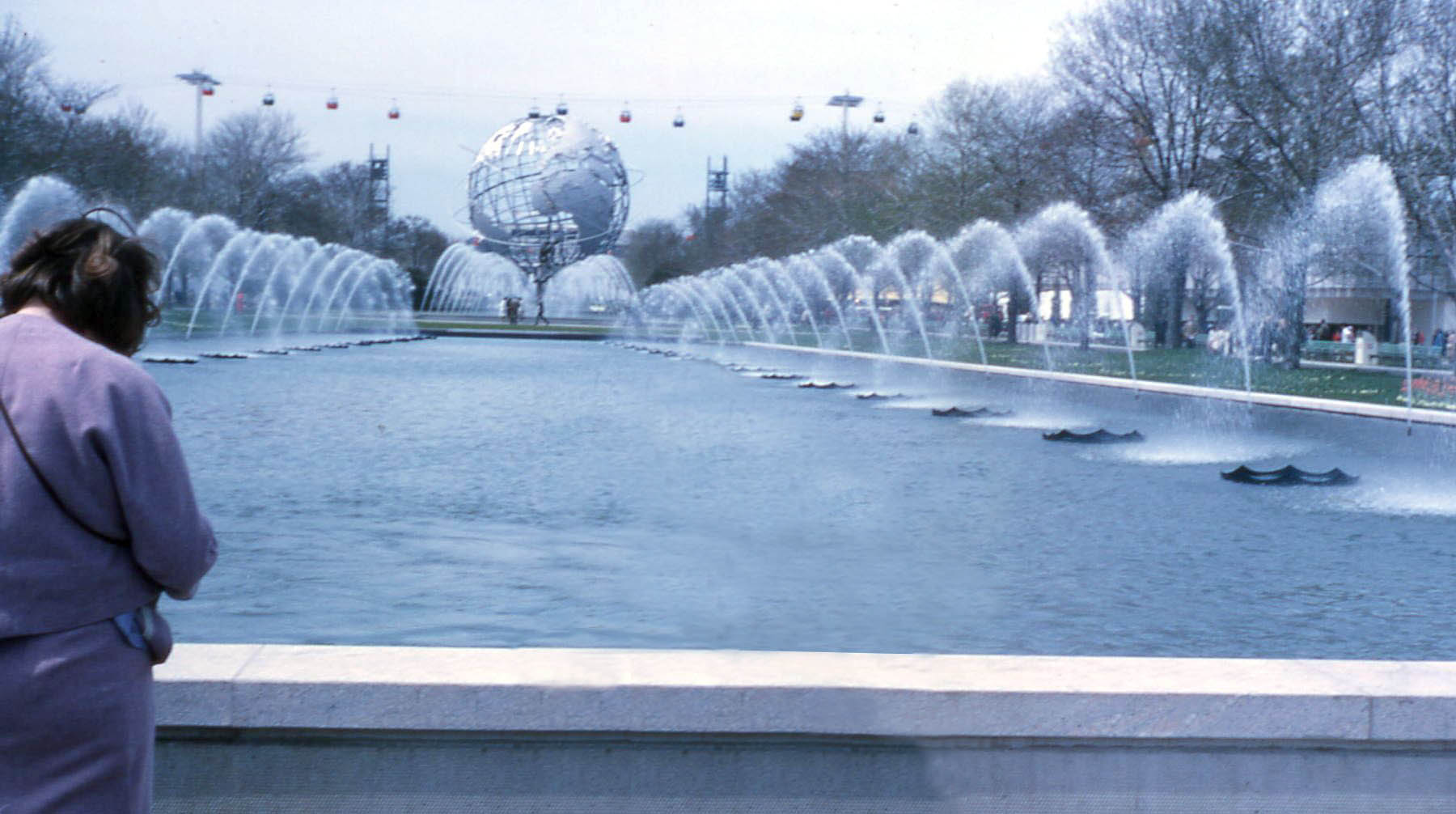
Fountains and a reflecting pool mark the approach to the Unisphere.

In May, the WFC announced it would proceed with the planned amusement area around Meadow Lake, hiring the billionaire H. L. Hunt to operate the rides. By mid-1961, the WFC had privately raised $25 million and was predicting a $53 million profit. The groundbreaking ceremony for the first pavilion took place that June. The WFC had difficulty selling the remaining bonds; it had sold around $30 million in promissory notes—three quarters of the total—by the end of 1961. During the fair's construction, civil-rights activists expressed concerns the WFC's leadership included very few African Americans. Moses met with activists but he still did not appoint African Americans to leadership positions, which attracted controversy amid the ongoing civil rights movement. The WFC hired an African American executive to the fair's international division in 1962. Later that year, New York governor Nelson Rockefeller formed a committee to investigate persistent complaints about discrimination within the WFC.

By the beginning of 1962, more than 60 nations, the governments of 30 U.S. states, and 50 companies had agreed to exhibit at the fair. The WFC also created a scale model of the fairground. The LIRR constructed a siding from the Port Washington Branch, allowing trains to deliver material onsite. At a luncheon in March that year, Moses said construction had fallen behind schedule. The WFC had allocated $6 million to advertise the fair by mid-1962, and Deegan predicted its participants would spend another $75 million of their own money on promotion. The WFC tried to attract Latin American countries to the fair. By late 1962, exhibits were being finalized and many pavilions were being constructed. Either 68 or 71 nations had announced plans for exhibits at the fair by then, though only 35 countries had formally leased space. Additionally, 125 businesses had expressed interest, and the WFC had finished installing utilities on the fairground. At the end of 1962, a small number of state and international pavilions were being built, while work in the industrial and transportation areas was progressing. Groundbreaking ceremonies were hosted for many of the international pavilions.

==== 1963 and 1964 ====
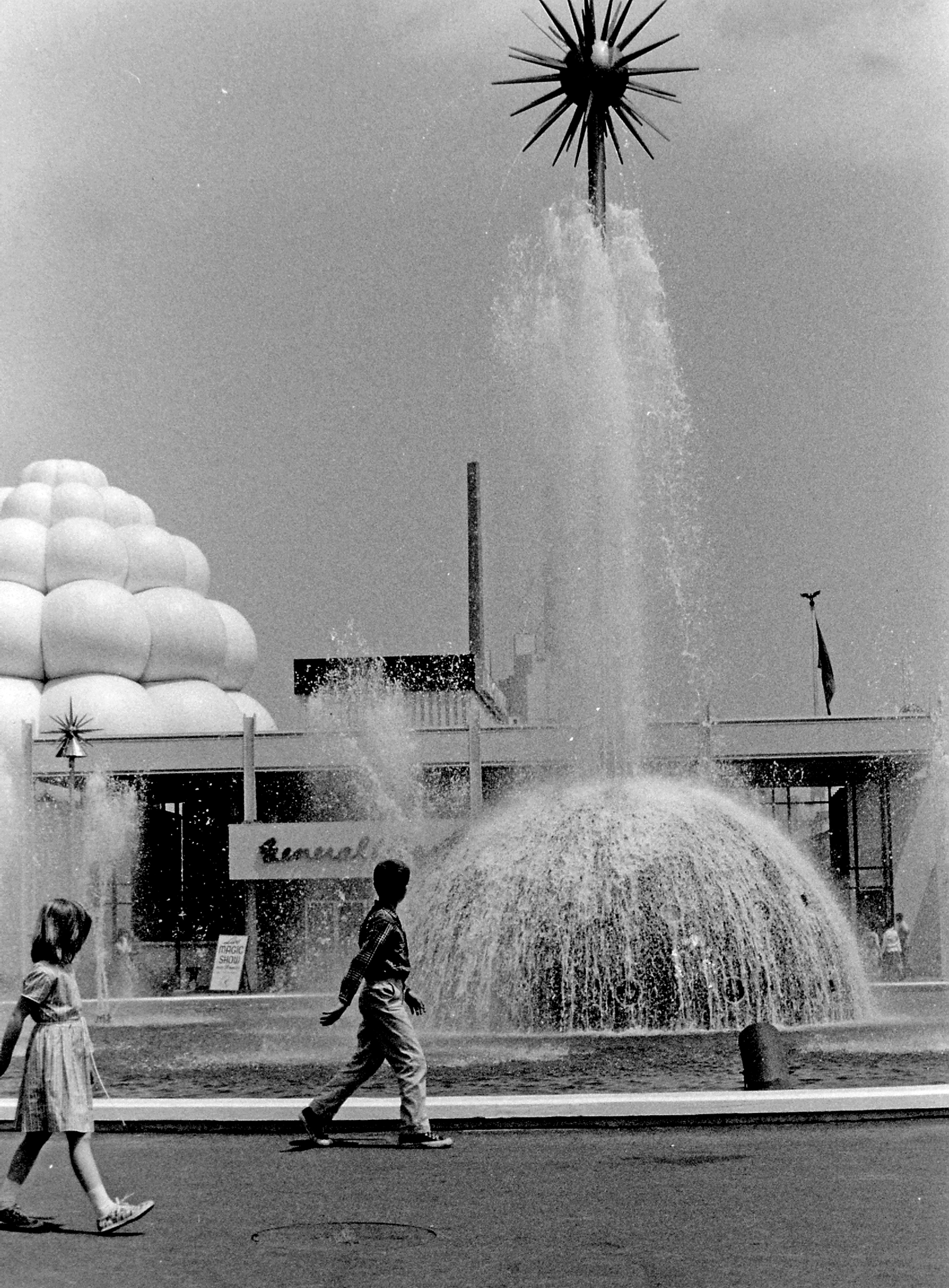
The solar fountain

In early 1963, the World's Fair Housing Bureau was formed to coordinate the development of hotel rooms for the fair. Despite commitments from state and national governments, only some of these governments were actively constructing pavilions. The WFC wanted to hire 40 concessionaires and sell 70 intellectual property (IP) licenses, which the corporation hoped would raise $130 million. On April 22, 1963, exactly a year before the fair's opening, the U.S. President John F. Kennedy activated a clock that would count down to the opening. Only 48 of the 200 proposed buildings had begun construction, even though construction of all major structures had to be underway by the following month. The press building opened that May, and the following month, an insurance syndicate was formed to protect the exhibits. By mid-1963, civil-rights groups were protesting the lack of racial diversity in the fair's development, and filed a lawsuit to halt construction. That July, Moses denied rumors that construction had fallen behind schedule.

Materials from overseas began arriving in August 1963, though work on 50 structures had not started by the next month. Moses became increasingly hostile toward journalists who doubted that the fair would be completed on time. There were also disagreements over discounted tickets for students; Moses opposed the plan but the city government ultimately forced him to sell discounted tickets. The first pavilion, the Port Authority Heliport, was opened in October 1963. The same month, Hunt resigned as the amusement area's operator following disagreements over ticket prices and rides. Work on many of the pavilions was behind schedule due to funding issues, labor shortages, and poor weather. There were also labor strikes, exhibitor withdrawals, and continuing racial tensions. Despite these difficulties, many pavilions were nearly completed by late 1963, and the WFC had sold 3.8 million advance tickets by the year's end. To draw attention to the fair, the WFC displayed models of exhibits at the Time-Life Building in Manhattan. Exhibits were installed through late 1963 and early 1964, and the WFC borrowed $3 million to fund the fair's completion.

In January 1964, the Chicago Tribune reported the site was filled with raw material, incomplete building frames, and unpaved roads. That month, WFC officials said work on 26 buildings was behind schedule, and they sought to demolish the World of Food pavilion, which would not be ready for the fair's opening. The WFC signed a document outlining ways profits from the fair were to be used. By that February, most of the major pavilions and attractions were complete, but Whipple estimated up to 10 pavilions would not be finished before the fair's opening. The same month, the WFC stopped selling advance tickets, having sold 28 million. There were still 4,800 construction workers on site in late March, when the state government began hiring people for the fair. Before the fair opened, the WFC had spent $30 million.

== Operation ==
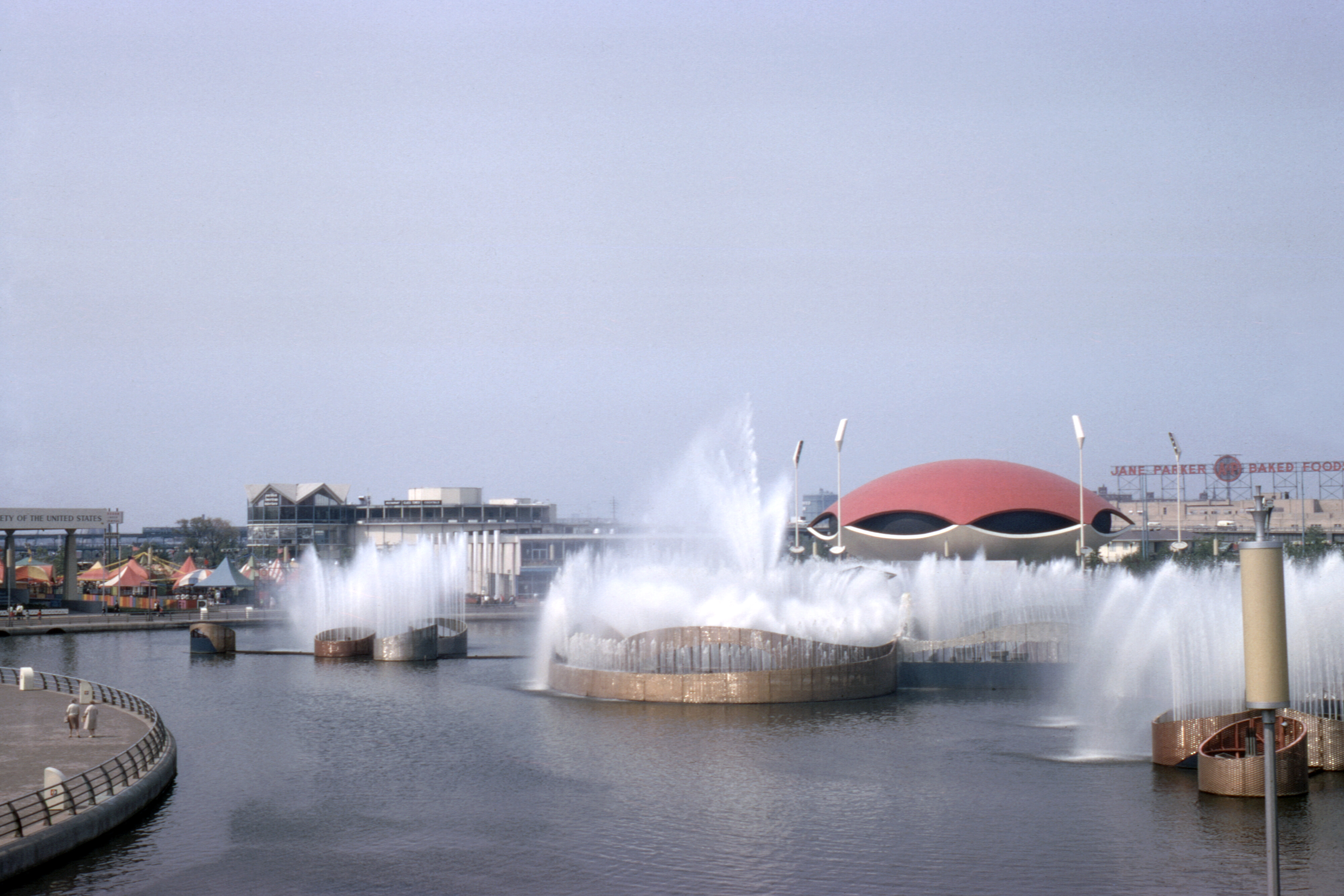
The fair's Pool of Industry

The WFC originally predicted a daily attendance of 225,000. Deegan predicted at least 6.7 million foreign visitors, out of an estimated total of 70 million. Visitors 13 and older were originally charged the adult admission price of $2.00 (equivalent to $20.76 in 2025), while children 2–12 years old were charged $1.00 (equivalent to $10.38 in 2025). The WFC sold discounted tickets in packs of 20; some major companies like AT&T bought hundreds of thousands of tickets for their employees. Students paid 25 cents if they visited with their teachers, and the WFC sold certificates that allowed a class of 25 students to enter the fair for $6.25. Moses predicted ticket sales of $120 million and a net profit of $40 million. Initially, city officials predicted people would spend $5 billion in the city due to the fair, an estimate that was later reduced to $2.5 billion.

The fair employed up to 20,000 people, but the WFC directly employed only between 180 and 200 people. There were 3,000 Pinkerton employees on the grounds, including firefighters, police officers, medics, matrons, and ticket sellers. Nine garbage trucks, nine emergency medical services (EMS) vehicles, 25 police cars, and three fire engines traveled the fairgrounds. Nine city health inspectors examined all of the on-site restaurants. United Press International (UPI) was the fair's official photographer, while United World Films had exclusive rights to produce and publish films about the fair. Allied Maintenance was the only maintenance firm allowed to work at the fair; it charged exorbitant fees, earning $10 million during 1964 alone. Allied also handled deliveries during the 1964 season but was replaced the following year with Rentar Corporation. Other companies, such as Hertz and Cities Service, sponsored free services or events. The WFC selected symbols of a boy and a girl as the fair's mascots.

Exhibitors were required to operate from 10 am to 10 pm daily, although the fairground opened at 9 am. Exhibits were prepared and cleaned throughout the night; the Vatican pavilion was the only attraction with a live-in caretaker. Many exhibitors hired racially diverse staff. In addition, the WFC required each exhibitor to purchase insurance from Campo & Roberts, which earned $3 million from insurance commissions.

=== 1964 season ===
==== Opening ====
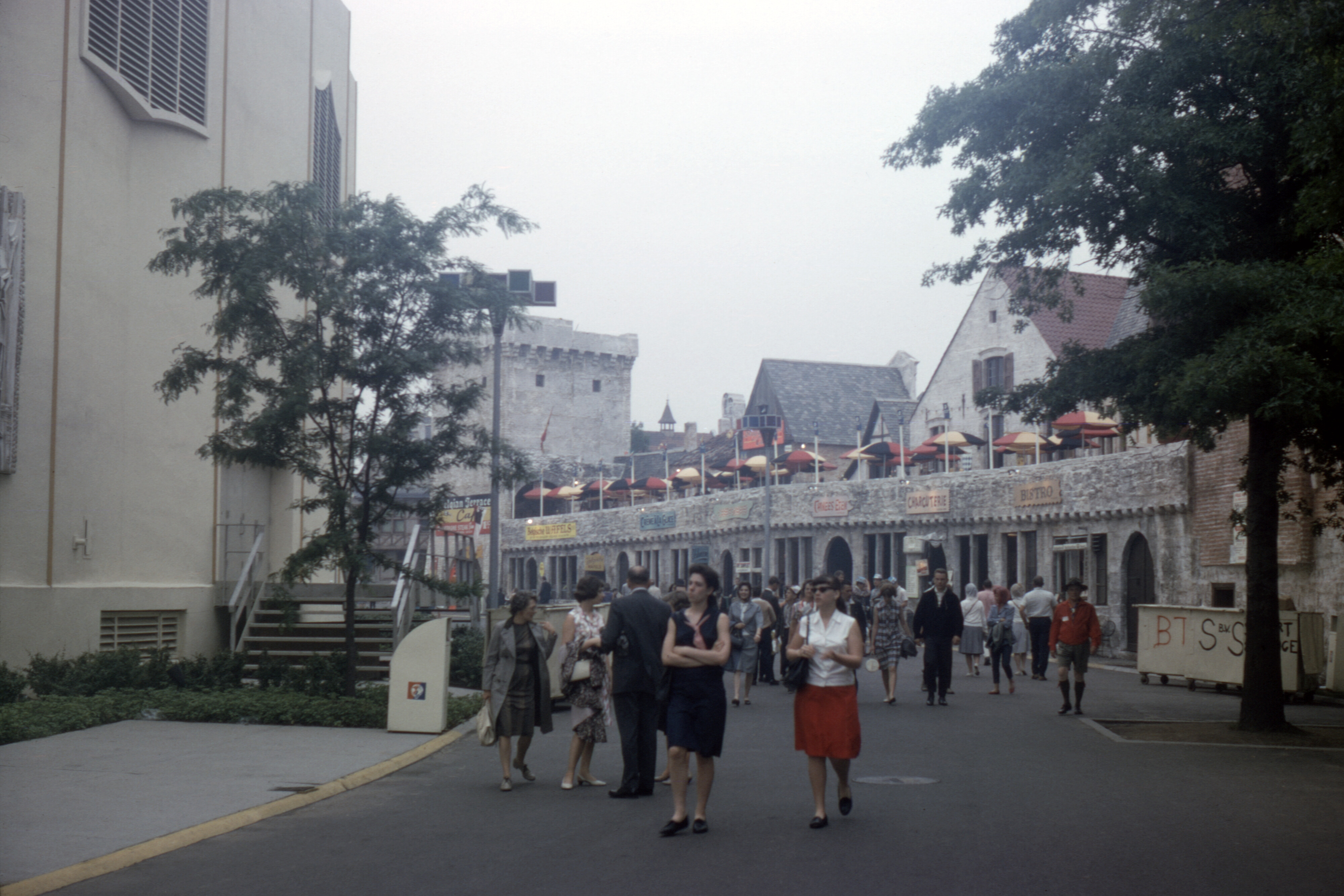
The Belgian Village was not completed until the end of the 1964 season.

The WFC did not host official press previews in the weeks before the official opening, though several exhibitors hosted previews of their pavilions. The night before the fair opened, the television series The Bell Telephone Hour broadcast an opening celebration. When the World's Fair officially opened at 9:00 am on April 22, 1964, the first visitor was a college student from New Jersey. The opening was celebrated with speeches by Robert Moses, Nelson Rockefeller, and the U.S. president Lyndon B. Johnson. The same day, Johnson dedicated the United States Pavilion, while Rockefeller and Moses dedicated the New York State Pavilion.

During the opening ceremonies, hundreds of civil-rights activists organized a sit-in and were arrested. The civil-rights group Congress of Racial Equality (CORE) proposed a "stall-in" to block roads leading to the fair, but few activists participated. The opening ceremony attracted 90,000 attendees, fewer than half of the predicted number, in part due to inclement weather. The WFC banned picketing on the grounds, prompting lawsuits from civil-rights groups; a federal judge later ruled protesters could give out handbills to passers-by.

The New York Times reported fifteen pavilions and three amusement attractions were not finished by opening day. One pavilion, the Belgian Village, was not completed until the end of the 1964 season, though it did operate for part of that year. Some pavilions could not open on schedule because artifacts in the pavilions had been damaged or were incomplete. Exhibitors also accused workers of delaying some pavilions' construction to collect overtime pay. Three incomplete pavilions were abandoned, and work on other pavilions continued for several months after the opening. The rich and famous, including government officials and heads of state, visited the fairground in the weeks after it opened.

==== May to October ====
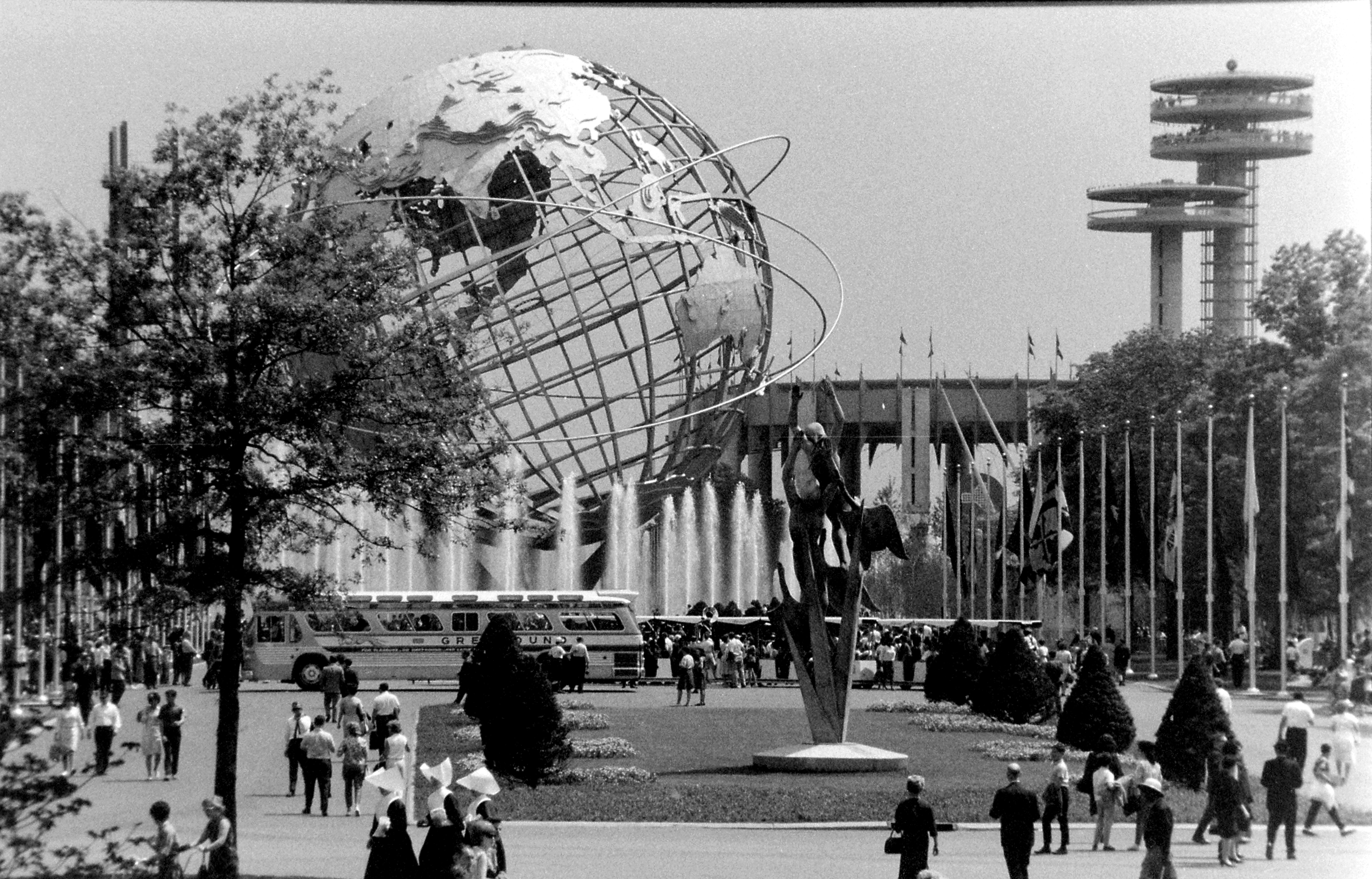
Looking south from the Unisphere toward the New York State Pavilion

The fair needed 220,000 daily visitors to recover its operating expenses of $300,000 per day. In its first week, the fair recorded nearly a million visitors, and 150,000 daily visitors—60 percent of initial projections—in the first month. Several problems arose; disputes occurred over labor unions, maintenance fees, and a mural in the Jordan pavilion. Thefts and breakdowns regularly occurred. Exhibitors complained about high rental rates and insufficient maintenance of the fairground. The Lake Amusement Area was especially unprofitable; it had few attractions and was difficult to access. The Texas pavilion's show in the Amusement Area, "To Broadway with Love", closed in July 1964, and the "Wonderwork" show nearby also closed before the first season ended. Many of the most-popular exhibits charged an additional fee, and visitors often did not bring enough money for food or for high-priced exhibits.

The WFC unsuccessfully attempted to entice visitors by offering discounts to taxi drivers and improving fairground lighting, and the WFC was planning promotional campaigns by the end of June. The J. Walter Thompson Company advertised the fair in New York City–area media. By mid-1964, some exhibitors had gone out of business, including the two largest shows in the Lake Amusement Area. Employees, especially the 4,000 college students who worked the fair, faced occupational burnout. Despite the troubles, the WFC was able to buy back one quarter of its promissory notes in mid-1964, and to attract visitors, exhibitors publicly downplayed their grievances with the WFC. The industrial and international pavilions were more profitable than the amusement area, whose financial troubles did not bother Moses.

The fair had difficulty attracting more than 200,000 daily visitors, even during July and August when students were on summer break. The fair recorded 13.4 million visitors by the season's midpoint in July 1964, and it received 5.8 million visitors that August, the highest of any month during the 1964 season. Nearly half of visitors came from the New York City area, and prospective visitors expressed fears about crime and unrest. Attendance declined significantly in September when children returned to school. In response, Moses said journalists were tarnishing the fair's reputation and accused them of suppressing attendance. An exhibitors' committee made several recommendations for increasing attendance but Moses rejected nearly all of them.

The fair closed for the season on October 18, 1964. There had been 33 million visitors, including 27 million who paid admission. The New York Times cited several reasons for the reduced attendance figures; these included fears of crime, lengthy queues, and high prices. The WFC had significantly overpaid several contractors, and the fair's operating expenditures during 1964 amounted to $33.3 million, twice the original budget. Moses had projected a $53 million surplus, but the surplus stood at only $12.6 million at season's end, barely enough to pay back the city government. The WFC reduced its estimated total profit for both seasons to $30 million. Despite the financial problems, many industrial pavilions had long queues and tens of thousands of daily visitors, and the General Motors and Vatican pavilions each saw more than 10 million visitors during 1964. The New York Times reported many international exhibitors were pleased with the fair but wanted someone else to operate it.

=== Off-season ===
Between the 1964 and 1965 seasons, the WFC hired 400 security guards to oversee the fairground, though exhibitors were obligated to maintain and guard their own pavilions. The WFC planned to spend $1.3 million on renovations, and 3,000 workers began winterizing the fairground in November 1964. The WFC planned to create a promotional film and advertisements for the fair, and it kept some of the paths and fountains illuminated. Deegan said several pavilions would be renovated and 12 new restaurants would be added. Moses also traveled around the world to persuade foreign exhibitors to display additional artifacts, such as a Gutenberg Bible and Spanish artwork, during 1965.

WFC officials said attendance would rise during the 1965 season, and anticipated 37.5 million visitors. The prediction was unrealistic; previous world's fairs typically had fewer visitors during their second season and no new pavilions were being planned. In its balance sheet, the WFC counted profits from advance ticket sales as part of its income for 1964, which meant revenue would be much lower than expected during 1965. Unless the fair had at least 37.5 million visitors in 1965, it would not be profitable. WFC officials, fearing reprisal from Moses, waited weeks to tell him about the fair's financial troubles. In November 1964, Moses told Wagner the WFC might not be able to repay the city's $24 million loan. The WFC's financial advisors raised suspicions of financial mismanagement the next month.

In January 1965, several of the WFC's financial advisors quit following bitter disputes, and the WFC requested $3.5 million to reopen the fair. The city controller Abraham Beame began auditing the WFC, and the WFC fired Deegan's public-relations firm, which had been receiving $300,000 annually for four years, following criticism over the firm's compensation. The WFC's internal audit found a $17.5 million deficit, but lawsuits delayed Beame's audit for several months. By February 1965, at least 14 exhibitors in the 1964 season had declared bankruptcy. Franklin National Bank offered to lend the WFC $3.5 million, but the WFC indicated it needed only $1 million. Though city officials wanted to remove Moses as the WFC's president, he retained his position. When Moses said he would spend $6.4 million to renovate Flushing Meadows–Corona Park before repaying debts, the WFC's finance chairman resigned. Two Marine Midland Bank branches provided a $1 million loan to the WFC that March, which the WFC repaid two months later.

During the off-season, several exhibitors renovated and modified their pavilions, spending over $7 million between them. At least 50 exhibits were upgraded and five major attractions were added, along with free entertainments and science demonstrations. New artworks and films were added to several pavilions. The struggling Lake Amusement Area became the Lake Area. The WFC asked the New York City Transit Authority to increase subway service to the fair, and 26 exhibitors collaborated on a promotional campaign. Fifty-three exhibitors proposed naming the first week of the 1965 season Fair Festival Week, to which Wagner agreed. The WFC produced a promotional film titled To the Fair, and individual exhibitors produced their own films. To reduce its debts, the WFC decreased its budget for the 1965 season and dismissed some employees.

=== 1965 season ===
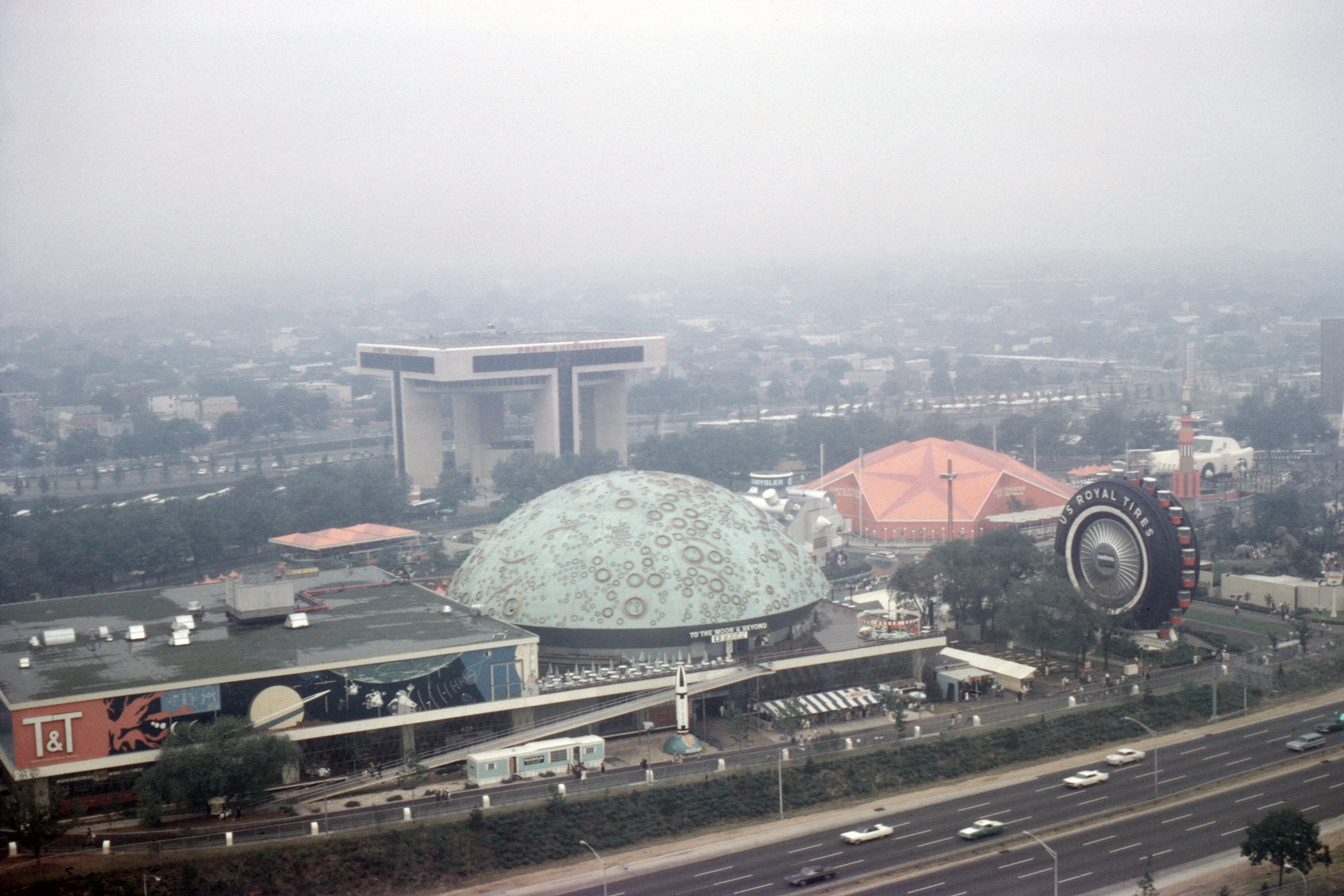
Aerial view of the Transportation and Travel Pavilion and Port Authority Heliport

More than 150,000 people attended the reopening of the fair on April 21, 1965. The Ethiopian long-distance runners Abebe Bikila and Mamo Wolde participated in a ceremonial half marathon, running from Central Park in Manhattan to Singer Bowl at the fairground. Unlike the 1964 opening ceremony, no protests occurred at the fair's reopening, and almost all exhibits were completed on time. For the 1965 season, adult admission fees were raised to $2.50 (equivalent to $25.54 in 2025). During the first 20 days of the 1965 season, attendance declined 22 percent compared with the same time period in 1964, putting many exhibitors at risk of bankruptcy. In addition, fewer visitors were paying at the gates because more than half of them carried advance tickets. Exhibitors requested a reduction in admission fees, and that a reduced-price evening admission ticket be sold. Moses refused both proposals, and several exhibitors threatened to close their pavilions before retracting.

At the beginning of the 1965 season, there were issues such as race-related protests, Vietnam War protests, a controversy over a racially insensitive song in one pavilion, and disputes between Jewish and Arab exhibitors. Vandalism also increased due to the reduced police presence, and a fairgoer was murdered that May. WFC officials also tried to invalidate their January 1964 agreement for disbursing the fair's profits, and exhibitors continued to lose money due to lower-than-expected attendance. Fewer visitors came during the evening, but the WFC again rejected a proposal for discounted evening admission in July 1965. Despite increased attendance in mid-1965, the fair continued to record decreased revenue compared with 1964. Many exhibitors recorded substantial losses from the costs of their pavilions. By August 1965, the WFC was preparing to clear the fairground after the fair, though 13 exhibitors had declared bankruptcy and could not afford to demolish or move their pavilions.

Beame's interim report, which was published at the end of August, found the WFC had squandered money by not awarding contracts through competitive bidding and by spending nearly everything it had on expenses it incurred before and during 1964. Despite Moses's denials of wrongdoing, Queens district attorney Frank D. O'Connor opened a criminal inquiry into the WFC shortly afterward. Moses installed highway signs promoting the fair and refused to remove them, even after city traffic commissioner Henry A. Barnes called the signs a safety hazard. By mid-September, estimates of the fair's total attendance had been reduced from 70 to 50 million. By the end of September, the fair had recorded 17 million visitors during the 1965 season, less than half the number of visitors needed to break even. At this point, the WFC had barely enough money to pay its weekly expenses.

Toward the end of the 1965 season, there was a sustained increase in attendance, and the fair recorded more than 250,000 daily visitors for three consecutive weeks. Exhibitors worried potential visitors would be dissuaded by the overcrowding. The architect and writer Robert A. M. Stern attributed the increase in attendance to a prevailing feeling the 1964 fair would be one of the last lavish world's fairs. Pope Paul VI visited the fair on October 4, 1965, during the first-ever papal visit to the United States. The fair closed on October 17, 1965, and recorded its highest-ever daily attendance of 446,953 on its final day. The fair's final day was chaotic, with reports of vandalism and theft. In total, the fair had recorded 51,607,448 admissions, seven million more than the 1939 fair and ten million more than Expo 58. The GM and Vatican pavilions had been the most popular. The fair had lost an additional $1 million in 1965 and had a deficit of up to $40 million at its closing; The New York Times partly attributed the fair's underperformance to Moses's stubborn attitude and refusal to take advice.

== Fairground ==
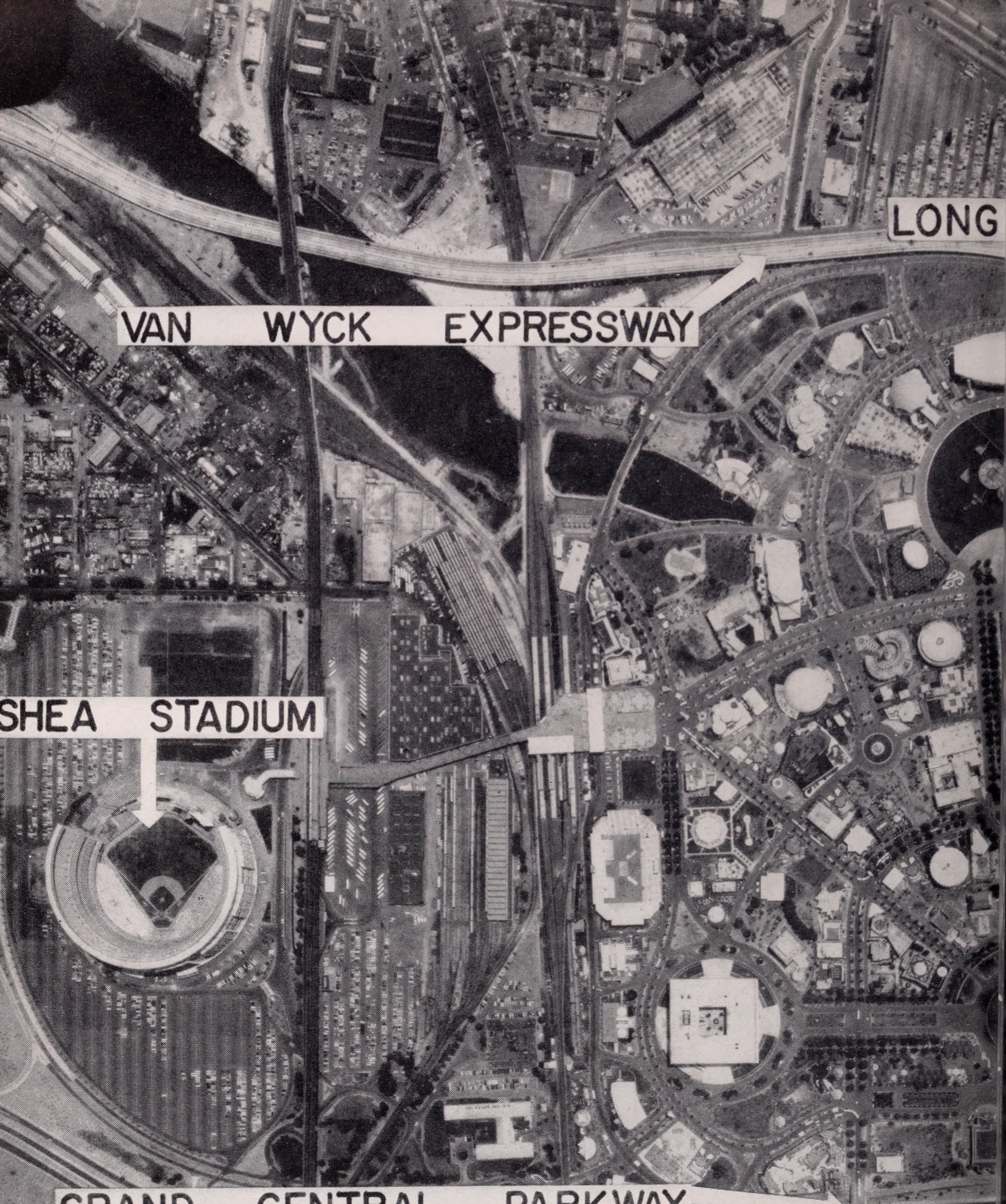
Aerial view of the northern part of the fairground during the 1964 World's Fair

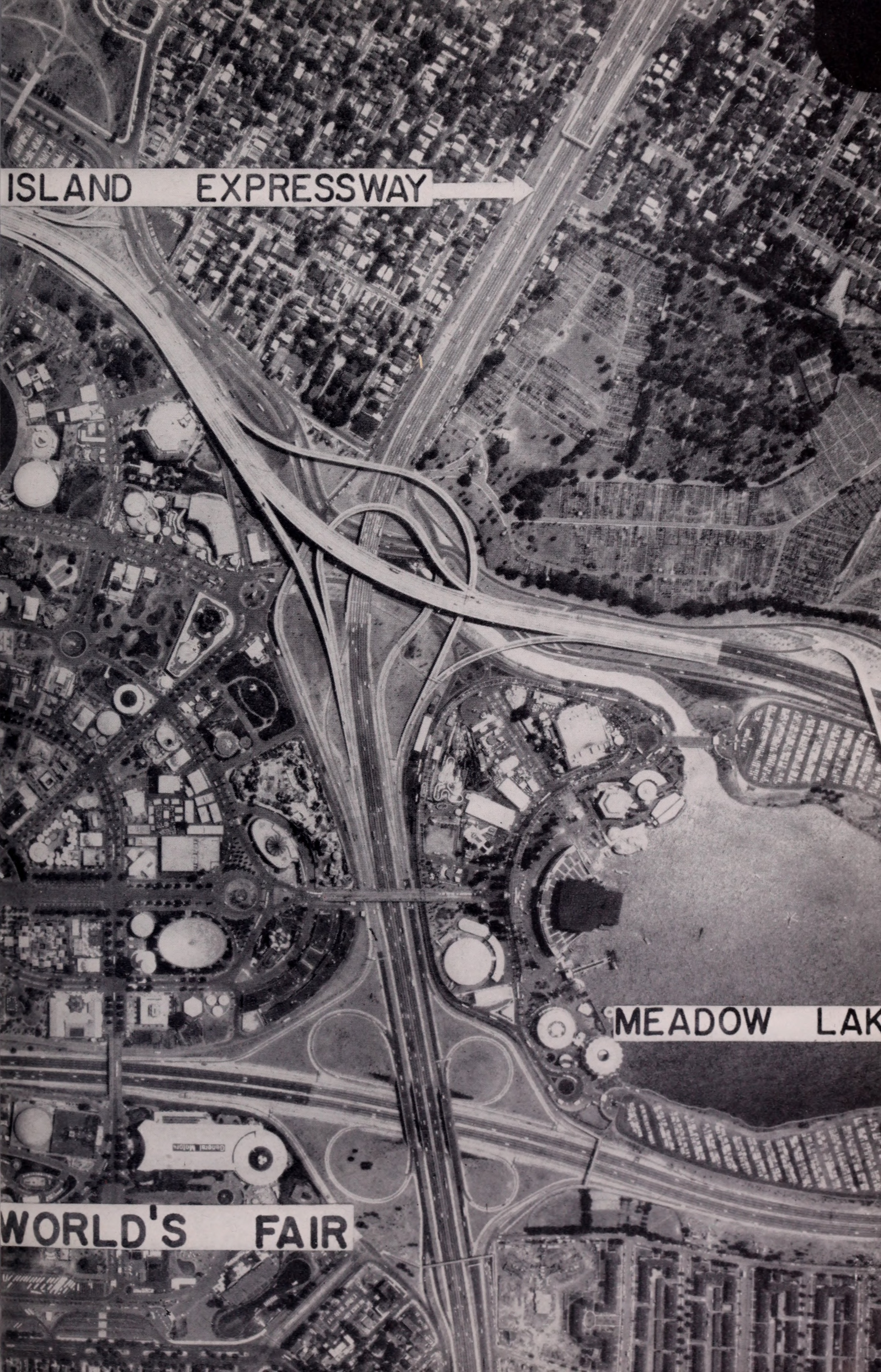
Aerial view of the southern part of the fairground during the 1964 World's Fair

The fairground was divided into five regions. Exhibits for individual U.S. states and the U.S. federal government were concentrated in the Federal & State Area at the center of the fairground near the Unisphere. The international exhibits were concentrated in the International Area—a group of pavilions surrounding the Unisphere. Industry pavilions were concentrated around the Industrial Area on the eastern end near the Van Wyck Expressway. The Transportation Area was on the western side of the fairground. South of the Long Island Expressway, connected with the rest of the fair only via one overpass, was the Lake Amusement Area (known as the Lake Area during 1965). Eight gates provided access to the fairground.

The 1964 World's Fair had 139 pavilions on opening day, in addition to 34 concessions and shows. (Note: This is sometimes cited as more than 200 exhibits and pavilions.) Of the pavilions and shows, either 121 or 124 were free, and the rest required an additional payment. Scattered across the fairground were 5,300 trees, 3,500 benches, 1,400 telephones, and 60 mailboxes. There were also bank branches, picnic areas, and restrooms. Accessible bathrooms, wheelchair rental stands, and Braille guidebooks were provided for disabled visitors. There were also several hotels nearby, albeit few campgrounds. A spokesman for the 1964 fair said the exposition was supposed to be "cultural and sophisticated", and Deegan claimed that the exposition would be the "greatest single event in history".

=== Pavilions ===
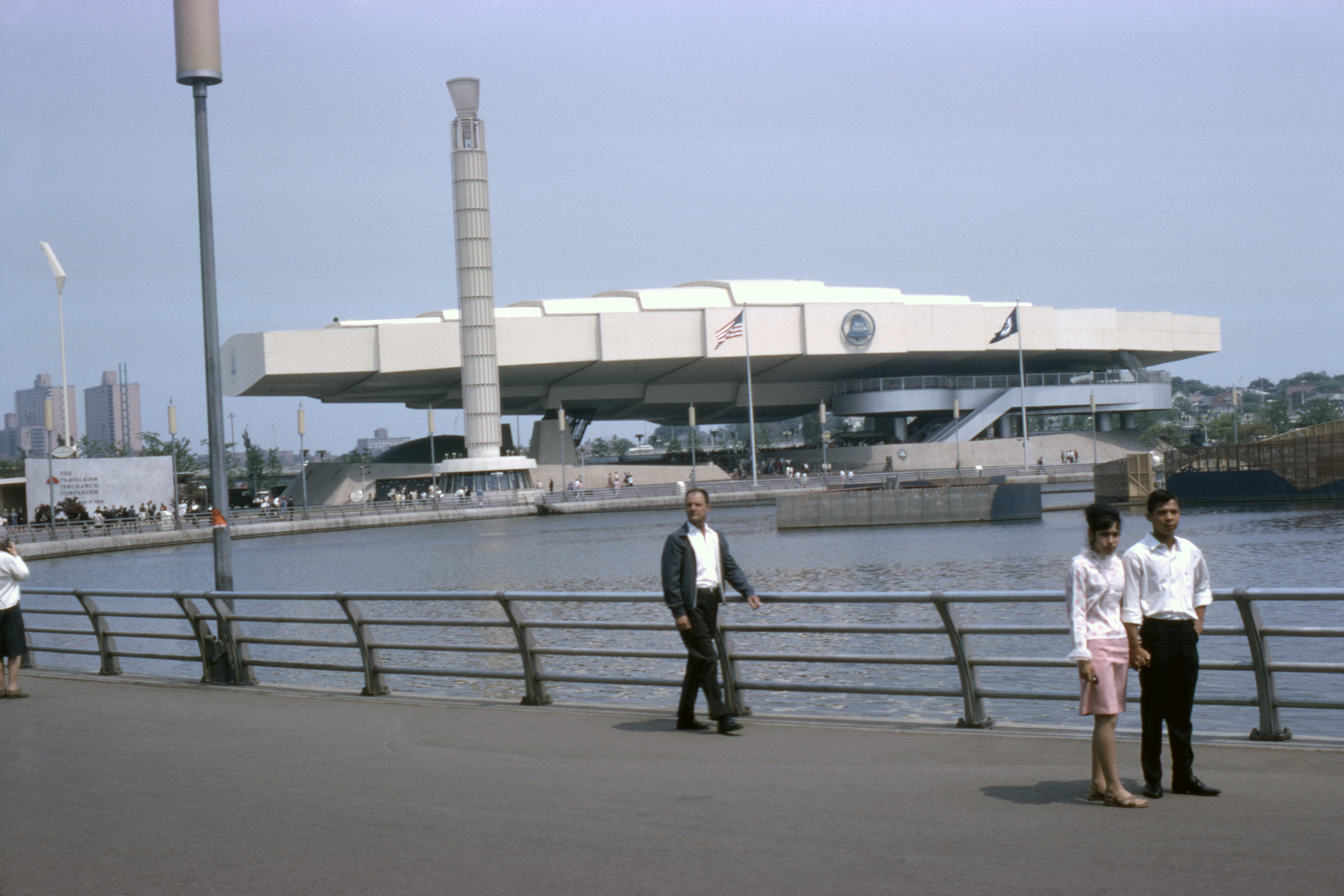
The Bell System Pavilion

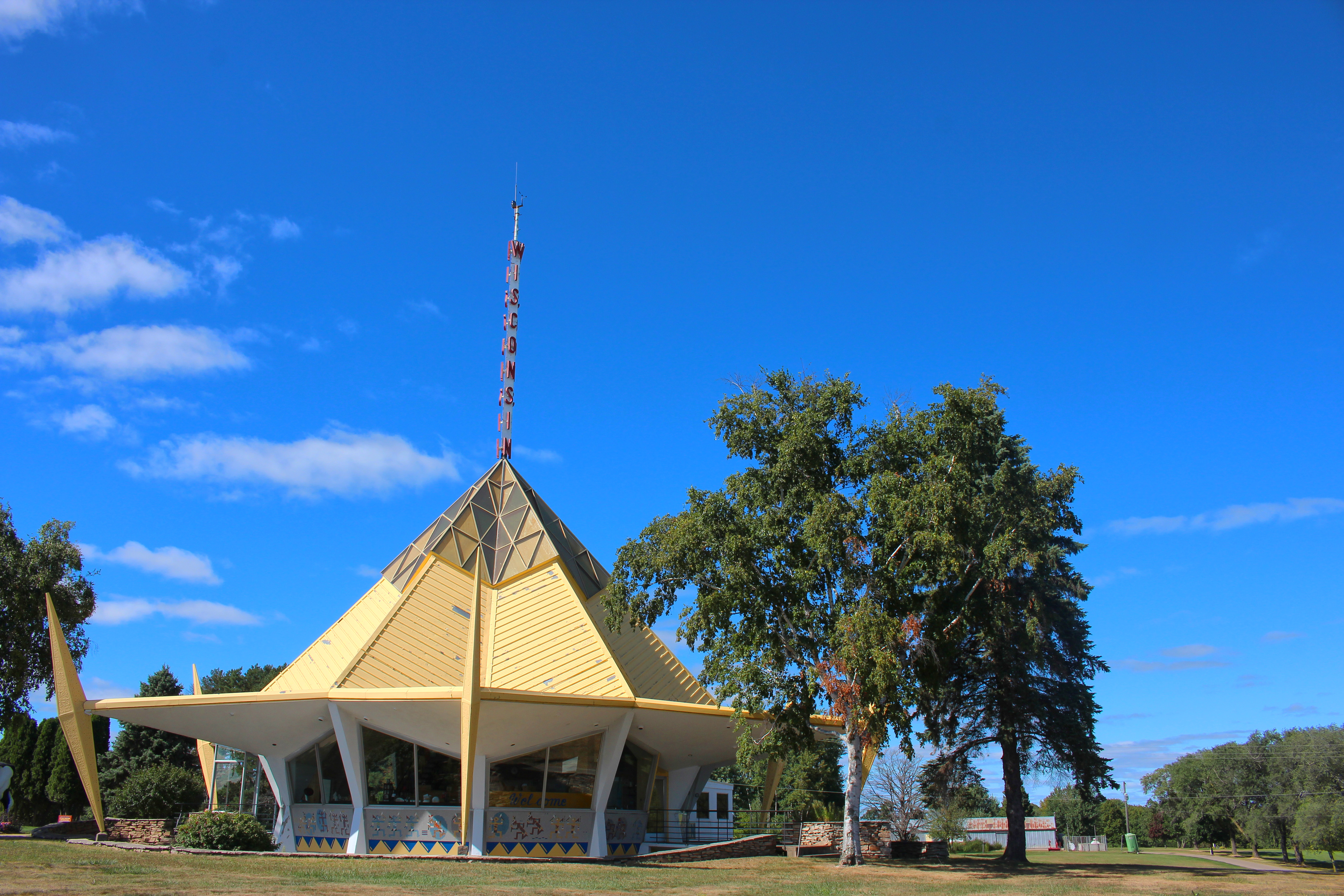
The Wisconsin Pavilion, which has since been relocated to Neillsville, Wisconsin

Each section of the fair was designed in several architectural styles, and many of the pavilions were designed in a Space Age style. Some pavilions used experimental designs; for example, the Bell System Pavilion was supported by massive cantilevers, while the IBM Pavilion was shaped like a giant egg. Most of the structures were designed so they could easily be demolished after the fair and rebuilt elsewhere. Any person or entity who could afford to rent the land and construct a pavilion could rent exhibition space at the fair. Thus, the space was dominated by large corporations. Private companies spent a combined $300 million on their pavilions. The Big Three car manufacturers—Chrysler, Ford, and General Motors—alone spent a combined $110 million on attractions such as Chrysler's artificial islands, Ford's Magic Skyway, and General Motors' Futurama car ride.

Twenty-three state pavilions were built. The fair included exhibits from 24 U.S. states; these were Alaska, Florida, Hawaii, Illinois, Louisiana, Maryland, Minnesota, Missouri, Montana, New Jersey, New York, Oklahoma, Tennessee, Texas, West Virginia, Wisconsin, and the six states in New England. New York City had its own pavilion, as did the neighborhood of Hollywood, Los Angeles, California. Nineteen of the state pavilions were in the Federal and State Area, and three of the other four state pavilions were clustered around Meadow Lake at the southern end of the fair. None of the state governments had to pay rent for the land, but they had to fund the buildings. Twenty states and Washington, D.C., did not pay for exhibits at the fair.

There were 45 pavilions in the International Area, most of which featured exhibits from foreign countries. Individual exhibits were presented by 66 nations, including the United States, whose pavilion was in the Federal and State Area. If nations that were represented only by one city or region are included, (Note: For example, West Germany, which was represented by West Berlin) the fair had attractions from 80 countries. Foreign nations rented land from the WFC, and paid for staff lodgings, food, and other expenses. Many nations from Asia, Africa, and Central and South America, though relatively few from Europe, exhibited at the fair. Some countries, such as the United Kingdom, France, and Italy, boycotted the fair because the BIE had not approved it. Because of a lack of participation from BIE members, only six major countries—Egypt, India, Indonesia, Japan, Mexico, and Pakistan—had official exhibits at the fair. Some BIE member countries hosted unofficial exhibits or were represented by those of private companies, and several countries were represented solely by an industry exhibit. Other countries were represented by regional pavilions, such as those for the Caribbean and Africa. Many of the international pavilions sold merchandise.

The Industrial Area had 43 pavilions, representing nearly 350 American companies. Most of the companies were consolidated within four exhibit buildings, though about 36 companies had their own pavilions. Corporations rented land from the WFC, while religious organizations were not required to pay for their space. Large firms such as Bell Telephone Company, DuPont, IBM, Kodak, RCA, The Travelers Companies, and US Royal Tires participated. The 1964 fair included only a few companies in the food, chemical, tobacco, cosmetic, or pharmaceutical industries and did not include any non-American car manufacturers. Transportation companies, including the Big Three car makers, displayed products in the Transportation Area of the fairground. Several of the industry pavilions offered free merchandise or other sponsorships, which often attracted customers. Moses provided about 7 acres (2.8 ha) of land for religious groups and invited every major sect of Christianity to the fair. Eight religious pavilions were built, each of which was staffed by volunteers. Some exhibits were planned but never built, such as the Soviet and Israel pavilions, but were displayed on official maps, causing confusion among visitors.

=== Amusement ===
In addition to pavilions, the Lake Area included several rides and attractions during 1964. John Ringling North operated a circus that performed in a 5,000-seat tent. Nearby was a wax museum. The amusement area also included a children's play area, a puppet show, a porpoise show, and other amusements. A lake cruise traveled off the shore of Meadow Lake and an early log flume ride was also installed at the fair. A replica of the ship Santa María was displayed in the lake. There was a 10,000-seat outdoor theater in the amusement area as well. Two Coney Island carousels were combined to form the Flushing Meadows Carousel.

The Florida pavilion took over much of the Lake Area in 1965, and two amusement areas called Carnival and Continental Park were added. Outside the Lake Area were the Fiesta Playground and the Sculpture Continuum Playground.

=== Transportation ===
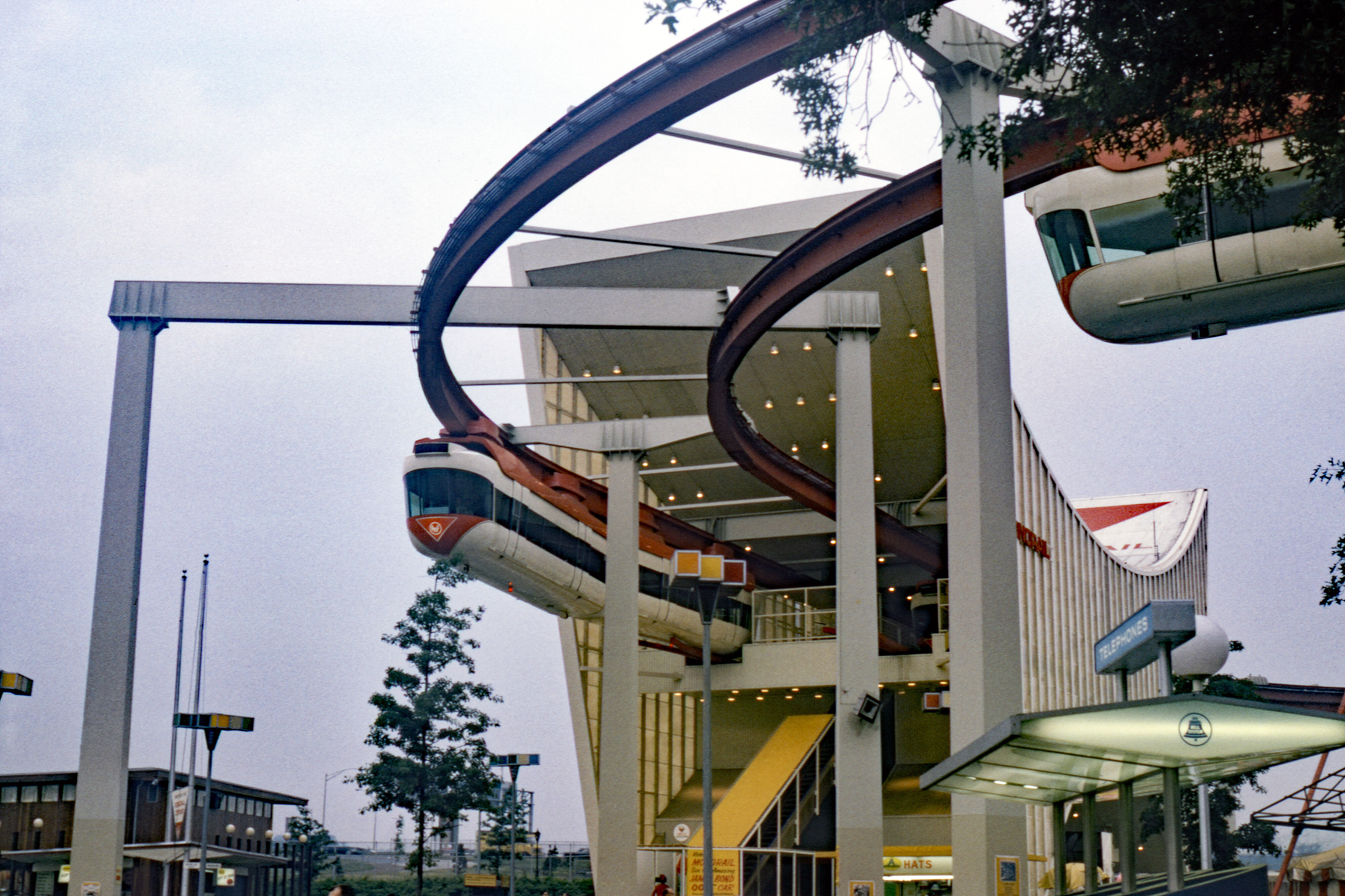
Monorail at the 1964 fair

The American Machine and Foundry Company constructed a suspended monorail with two 4,000-foot-long (1,200 m) tracks in the Lake Area. The line had seven 80-passenger, two-car-long trains. Another transport attraction at the fair was the Swiss Sky Ride, a ski lift or aerial gondola that was sponsored by the Government of Switzerland. During the 1964 season, visitors could rent one of 147 Greyhound Escorters, which were driven by chauffeurs. Sixty-one Glide-a-Ride trolleys also served the fairground during both seasons.

The fairground was accessed via highways on Long Island that had been upgraded. An expanded World's Fair Marina provided access via Flushing Bay. The fair was also served by a short-lived ferry service to Manhattan, as well as other ferry routes to ports in New York and New Jersey. A helicopter shuttle provided services to the Pan Am Building and Lower Manhattan heliports. Local buses, airport shuttle buses, the New York City Subway, and the Long Island Rail Road (LIRR) also stopped near the fairground. The subway cars R33S and R36WF were constructed for the number seven route that served Willets Point station near the fair. Although a dedicated subway line had served the 1939 fair, no such route was built for 1964. A luxury bus service carried "distinguished guests" to and from the fair. There were 20,000 parking spaces, and shuttle buses transported people from the parking lots to the main gate.

=== Other features ===
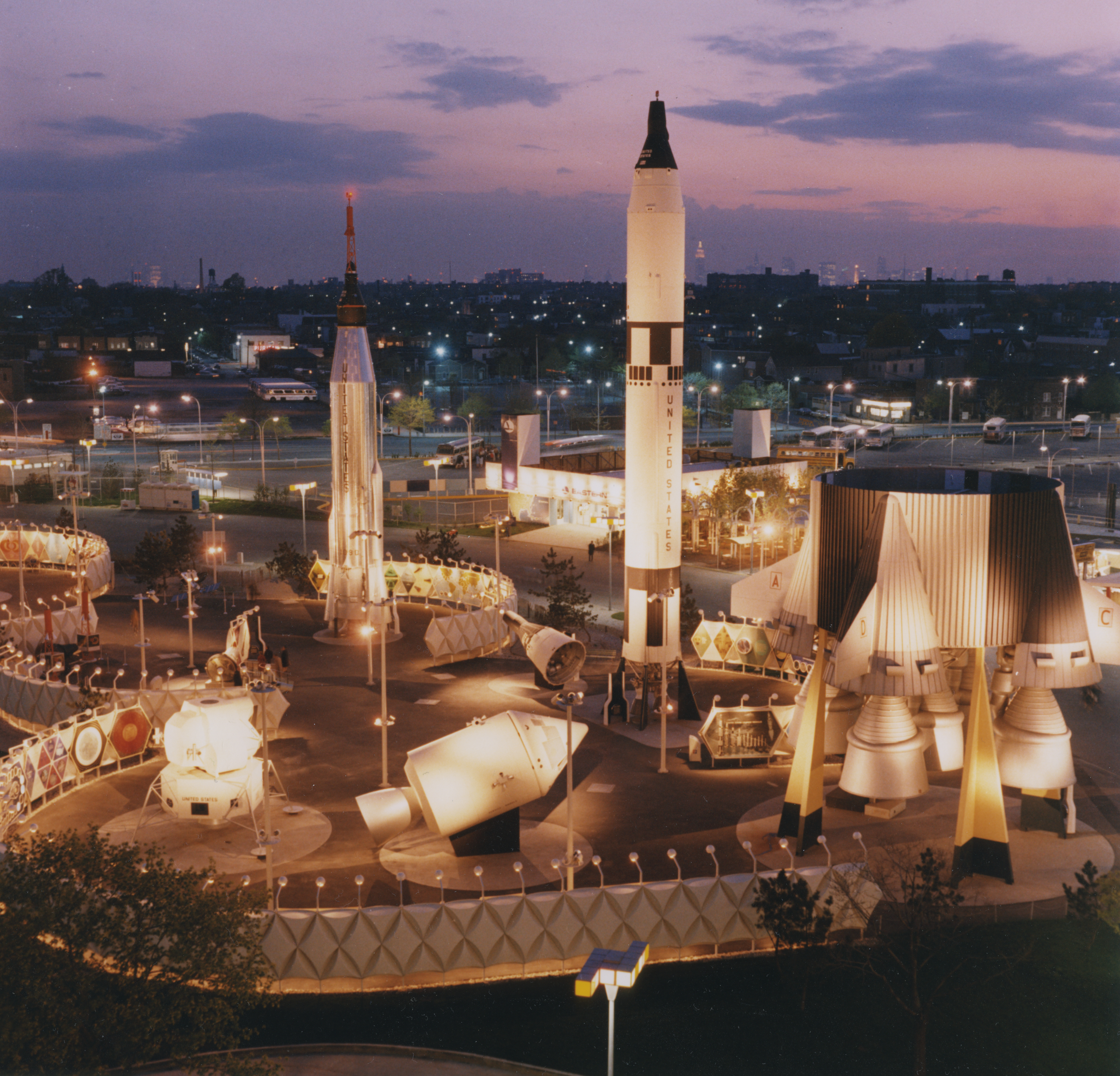
U.S. Space Park, as it appeared in December 1963 before its official opening

The fairground had nine fountains; the fountains of progress north and south, the fountains of the fairs east and west, the lunar fountain, the solar fountain, the astral fountain, the fountain of the continents, and the fountain of the planets and two reflecting pools. Seven of the fountains had custom designs, although none have survived. At the center of the fair was the Unisphere, which was constructed by American Bridge Company. Weighing 700,000 pounds (317,515 kg), the globe was created to symbolize "man's achievements on a shrinking globe in an expanding universe". The Fountain of the Planets (Pool of Industry), which is located at the far eastern end of Flushing Meadows–Corona Park, could spray water up to 625 feet (191 m) high, and it hosted nightly fireworks displays and music performances. The Unisphere and Fountain of the Planets are connected via the Fountain of the Fairs, which included a five-section reflecting pool and two rectangular pools.

The fairground had 28 mi (45 km), 39 mi (63 km), (Note: Alpert 1964, p. 21, cited the fair as having 14 miles (23 km) of roads and 25 miles (40 km) of paths.) or 40 mi (64 km) of paths, and numerous plazas. Throughout the fairground were information booths operated by Greyhound Bus. Near the northern end of the fairground was a customs building, where customs officials examined items bound for the fair's international pavilions and concessionaires. There was a press building next to the Grand Central Parkway, with a reporters' bullpen, offices for major news agencies, a press conference room, and offices. The on-site, 22-room Atomedic Hospital was constantly staffed, and there were five first-aid stations. About 300 closed-circuit televisions (CCTVs) were installed across the fairground, and a film studio for independent filmmakers was also built. Pinkerton matrons operated a lost-child bureau with activities and games for lost children.

== Culture ==
Foreign cultures and American technologies were featured at the fair. While WFC rules technically prevented the fair's officials from influencing the design or contents of any exhibits, the WFC retained a significant influence on the contents of exhibits. For example, developing nations were encouraged to show their art and culture rather than technology, and WFC officials pressured Islamic nations to emphasize their religion.

=== Cuisine ===
The fair had a large number of restaurants and eateries. When it opened, there were between 110 and 114 eateries, 61 of which were within pavilions. There were six specialty restaurants and 25 fine-dining restaurants operated by Brass Rail. Restaurant Associates was contracted to operate several of the restaurants but its contract was canceled because of a dispute over signage, and Brass Rail instead received the contract. Ten of Brass Rail's restaurants were designed by Victor Lundy and had canopies shaped like bunches of white balloons. For the 1965 season, the fair was expanded to include 198 restaurants.

Cuisine sold at the fair included Belgian waffles, 7 Up drinks, dumplings, pizza, tacos, kimchi, Turkish coffee, tandoori chicken, and hummus. Many of these dishes became popular in New York City and in the U.S. after the fair closed. The Thailand pavilion included North America's first Thai restaurant, while the Malaysia pavilion served Tiger Beer and satay. During the 1964 season, many meals cost 99 cents because any food below $1 could not be taxed. Brewers spent millions of dollars persuading exhibitors to sell their beers.

=== Performances ===
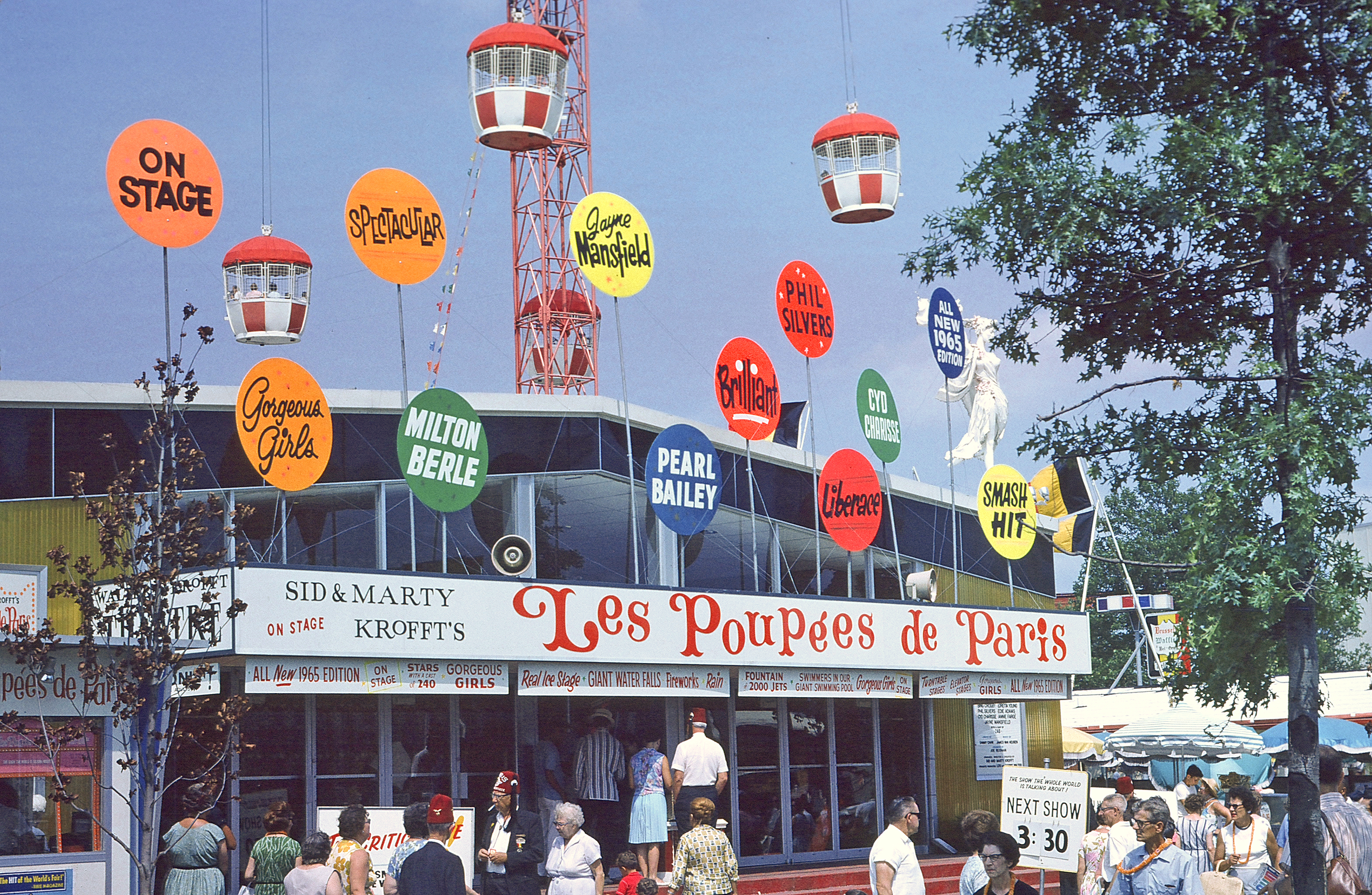
A puppet show building at the fair

There were more than 30 entertainment events at the fair. Moses disdained carnival-style attractions, saying there would be "no whiskered women, tattooed giants, nudes on ice ... The appeal of a world's fair should not be entirely below the Adam's apple". As the WFC's president, Moses reserved the right to ban any project from the fair. Shows that appealed to prurient interests, like semi-nude dancing, were excluded. An exception was the adult-only, musical puppet show Les Poupées de Paris (The Dolls of Paris). The lack of adult shows may have contributed to the amusement area's unpopularity in 1964. The ban on adult shows was relaxed in 1965, and nine discotheques opened at the fair during that season. That May, a striptease show in the Louisiana pavilion lasted two performances before it was canceled.

Musical and theatrical performances took place at several pavilions, and there were fireworks and water shows at the Pool of Industry. Among the theatrical shows were the revues To Broadway With Love, Wonder World—which lasted two months— and Summer Time Revue. DuPont presented a musical revue in its own pavilion, The Wonderful World of Chemistry. A controversial minstrel show in the Louisiana pavilion was canceled after two days. International pavilions, such as the African, Indonesia, and Spain pavilions, also hosted dance and other live shows.

Sporting events, such as wrestling, boxing, gymnastics, fencing, judo, and weightlifting, took place at the fair. Some of these events were presented as part of the 1964 Summer Olympics tryouts in New York City. Other shows included the ice-skating show Dick Button's Ice-Travaganza at the New York City Pavilion, and the Auto Thrill Show in the Transportation Area. To Broadway With Love and the Ice-Travaganza closed within a few months of the fair's opening. A parade traveled across the fairground every day. The evangelist Billy Graham gave daily sermons at the Billy Graham Pavilion.

=== Music and film ===
External videos
- "1964 New York World's Fair From the Air" – promotional film of the architectural styles utilized in the fairgrounds (1964) on Internet Archive

The fairground did not emphasize music, although a "World's Fair Festival" took place at Lincoln Center in Manhattan. Popular and classical music was broadcast from 800 luminaries around the fairground. The fair also had an official band; Cities Service's World's Band of America, a 50-piece ensemble, was headed by the conductor Paul Lavalle. Other ensembles, including Guy Lombardo, the United States Marine Band, and the United States Navy Steel Band, performed throughout the fair. During 1964, the amusement area hosted rock-and-roll concerts that were popular among local youth; Moses, who abhorred the genre, canceled these concerts when he learned about them. The Jamaican delegation included performers Jimmy Cliff, Prince Buster, Eric "Monty" Morris, Byron Lee and the Dragonaires; record producers such as Edward Seaga and Ken Khouri; and choreographers Alphonso Castro and Ronnie Nasrala. The Jamaican delegation's trip, occurring less than two years after the Independence of Jamaica, is considered the first global promotion of Jamaican music and the introduction of the genre of ska, which later evolved into rocksteady and reggae.

The fairground contained about 40 movie theaters, most of which were housed within pavilions, for which fifty films were produced. These included several religious films: Parable at the Protestant and Orthodox pavilion; Man in the 5th Dimension at the Billy Graham pavilion; and Man's Search for Happiness at the LDS pavilion. The Johnson's Wax pavilion screened a film titled To Be Alive!, which later won an Academy Award. The WFC produced a film promoting the fair in seven languages in 1964.

=== Art and artifacts ===
Originally, the WFC made no effort to coordinate art exhibitions at the 1964 World's Fair, and Moses did not wish to subsidize art exhibits on the fairground, nor did he want to pay for an art pavilion himself. After commentators spoke about the lack of art at the fair, Moses changed his mind and allowed states to display art in their pavilions. Ten pop artists designed art for the New York State Pavilion's Theaterama, and the Fine Arts pavilion displayed 250 contemporary artists' work.

Foreign nations also displayed art and artifacts at the fair. Spain displayed works from artists such as Francisco Goya, El Greco, Joan Miró, Pablo Picasso, and Diego Velázquez. The United Arab Republic displayed artifacts from several historical eras; the Sudan pavilion displayed a 1,300-year-old Madonna fresco; the Jordan pavilion showed the Dead Sea Scrolls; and the Republic of China pavilion displayed Chinese jade. During the 1965 season, the Mexico pavilion displayed art, including Mesoamerican pieces and works by José Clemente Orozco, Diego Rivera, David Alfaro Siqueiros, and Rufino Tamayo. Though art was also displayed in gift shops throughout the fair, WFC officials generally only publicized artwork that was exhibited in pavilions.

There were 95 sculptures at the fair, including five permanent sculptures, four which remain in Flushing Meadows–Corona Park: Forms in Transit by Theodore Roszak, Freedom of the Human Spirit by Marshall Fredericks, Free Form by José de Rivera, and Rocket Thrower by Donald De Lue. Armillary Sphere by Paul Manship, was vandalized and the remaining pieces were stolen in 1980. The temporary sculptures included Pietà by Michelangelo at the Vatican pavilion, which was one of the fair's most-popular exhibits.

=== Consumer products ===
The 1964 World's Fair introduced and showed many consumer products, in what one magazine called "the ultimate marketing bonanza of [its] time". Color television was popularized at the fair, and the Ford Mustang was launched just before its appearance at the fair. The fair also displayed technologies such as Picturephones and IBM computers, as well as electronic devices that could display personalized data to visitors. Some pavilions incorporated personal computers into their exhibits, and many visitors saw touchtone phones for the first time while at the fair. Other innovations, such as thermonuclear fusion power plants, undersea hotels, underground houses, jet packs, and Corfam synthetic leather, never became popular.

== Aftermath ==
=== Site usage ===
==== Site clearing ====
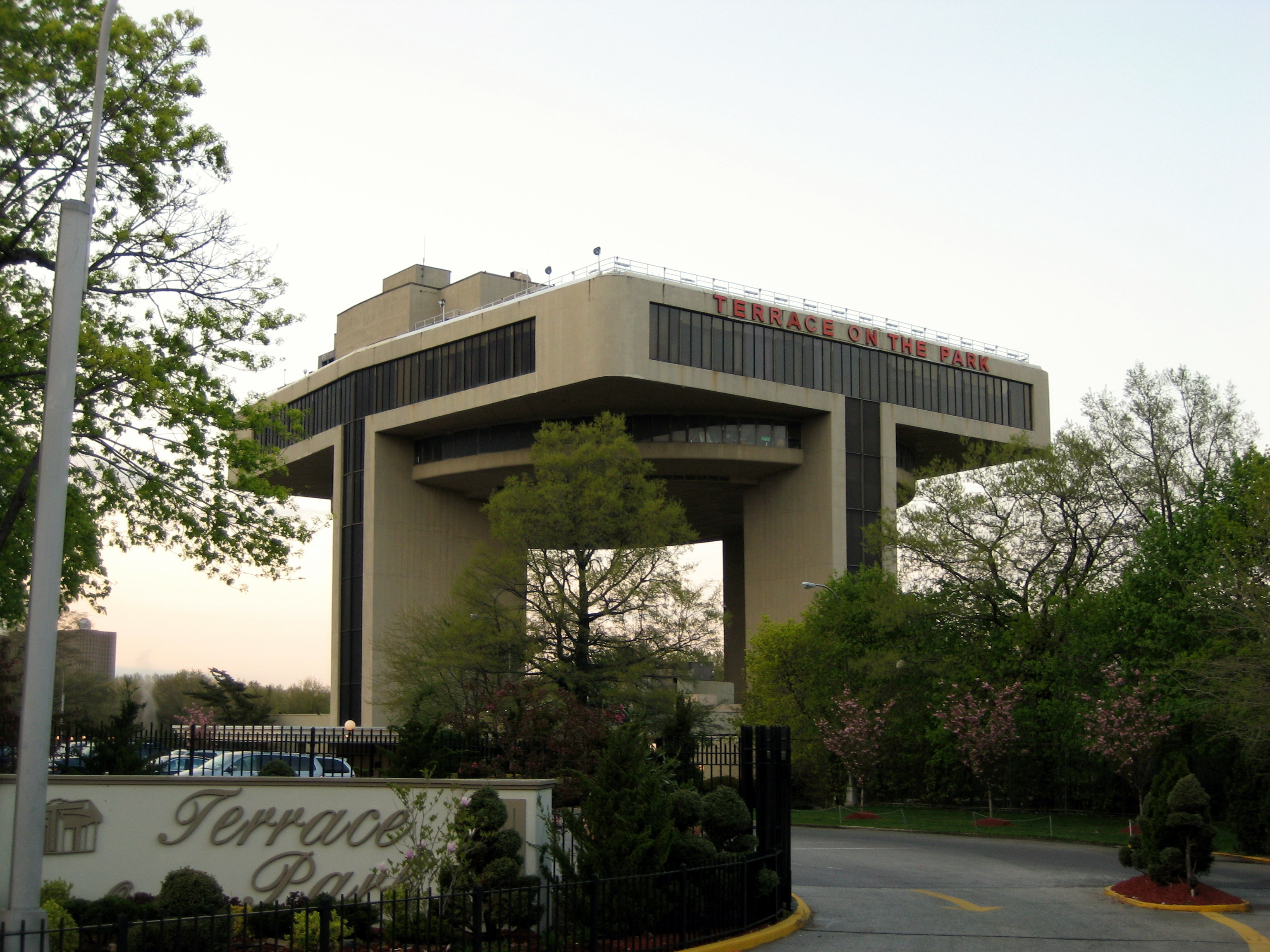
Terrace on the Park in Flushing Meadows-Corona Park was built as the heliport for the 1964 World's Fair but now houses a restaurant.

Moses predicted the WFC would need to spend $11.6 million to clear Flushing Meadows–Corona Park after the fair closed. He recommended the demolition of most of the pavilions. By mid-1965, the WFC proposed the preservation of 19 structures, while the remaining pavilions were offered to anyone who could afford to relocate them. Several exhibitors, including U.S. Steel and Thailand, chose to sell their buildings due to the high cost of demolition, while others sold the contents of their pavilions, and people offered to salvage parts of some buildings. Any other buildings had to be demolished within 90 days of the fair's closure. Each exhibitor was supposed to have placed money in escrow or posted a bond to cover the demolition costs, but most exhibitors had not done so. The WFC feared exhibitors would abandon their pavilions.

Demolition began the day after the fair closed and the rubble was dumped into Flushing Bay. By November, the site was filled with rubbish and rats. Scientists temporarily preserved three of the fair's buildings for structural testing. The deadline for demolition was extended to December 1966, and by the middle of that year, about 24 structures remained. Moses suggested his Triborough Bridge and Tunnel Authority should provide funding to convert the fairground into a park. The city government took over Flushing Meadows–Corona Park from the WFC in June 1967. Few improvements were made to the park for several years and many of the remaining structures were vandalized. According to a 1986 report, the city government had to spend $107 million ($314 million in 2025) to turn the fairground into a park. In the 1980s, a 1989 World's Fair was proposed for the site to mark the 25th Anniversary of the 1964 fair, but the proposal was unsuccessful. The paths remain almost unchanged into the 21st century.

==== Remaining structures ====
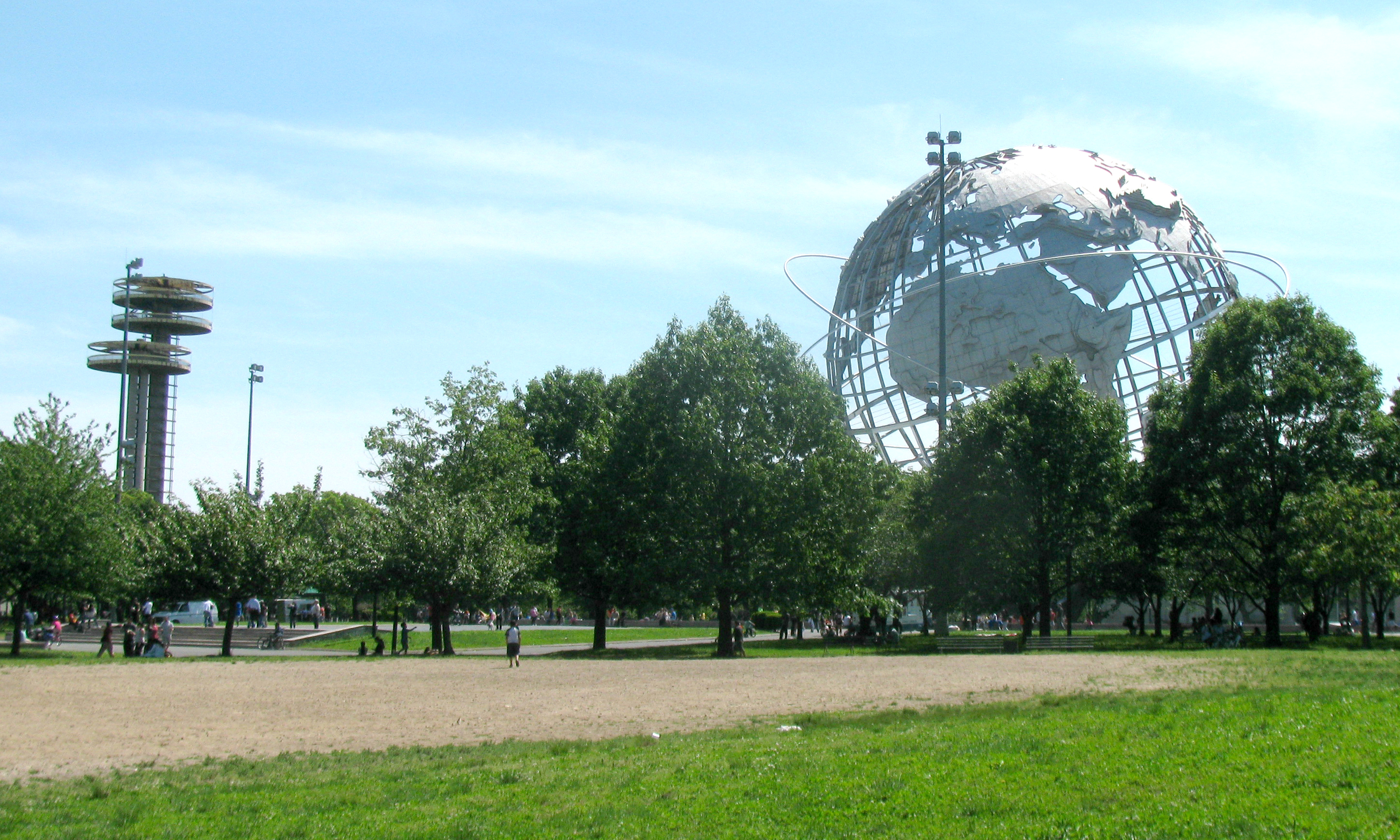
The New York State Pavilion (left) and the Unisphere (right) remain in Flushing Meadows.

Some of the structures from the 1964 World's Fair, including the fair's symbol the Unisphere, remain in Flushing Meadows–Corona Park. Near the Unisphere is the Column of Jerash from Jordan's pavilion, a stone bench marking the site of the Vatican pavilion, and a plaque on the site of the Garden of Meditation. The New York City Pavilion houses Queens Museum, and the New York Hall of Science is also preserved as a museum. The western side of the fairground site includes the Port Authority pavilion, which became the Terrace on the Park banquet hall; the Winston Churchill Tribute, which became an aviary for Queens Zoo; and the Flushing Meadows Carousel. The New York State Pavilion is largely unused as of 2024, but its former Theaterama is used by Queens Theatre in the Park. The World's Fair Marina along Flushing Bay still operates. Other buildings, including the Transportation and Travel and Greyhound pavilions, stayed late into demolition; the Greyhound Pavilion survived until a few months after the park's reopening. The United States Pavilion, the Aquacade amphitheater, press building, and the Singer Bowl remained for several years before their demolition.

Other structures were relocated after the fair closed; among these were the Austria, Christian Science, Denmark, Indonesia, Japan, Malaysia, Mormon, Parker Pen, Spain, Switzerland, Thailand, and Wisconsin pavilions, in addition to the Uniroyal Giant Tire and Golden Rondelle Theater. In some cases, only parts of buildings were preserved due to the high cost of full preservation. The LIRR, Mormon, Socony Mobil, and West Berlin pavilions, as well as the monorail, Poupees des Paris, and the wax museum, were preserved within New York. Other objects, including parts of the Hollywood and Ireland pavilions, the Coca-Cola pavilion's carillon, the It's a Small World ride, Progressland carousel, and the Swiss Sky Ride, were sent further afield. Some pavilions, such as Clairol's "color carousel" and Sinclair Oil's dinosaur exhibits, became traveling exhibitions.

=== Profitability and effect on other world's fairs ===
Profits from the fair would have been used to improve Flushing Meadows–Corona Park, and many of its restaurants broke even. On the fair's closing day, the WFC had $11.58 million in cash. Moses anticipated the WFC would not be able to repay the remaining $22.4 million in promissory notes, and the WFC was expecting to default on 60 percent of the bonds it had issued. In December 1965, Beame determined the fair had lost $20.1 million in 1964 due to improper management. The WFC later agreed to pay noteholders another $4 million in mid-1966, although it struggled to fulfill its obligation to restore the fairground.

During the late 1960s, the WFC was separately investigated on charges of financial mismanagement regarding the Belgian Village pavilion, and the New York state government opened a racketeering investigation into the fair's construction. The city government received $1.5 million in profits from the fair in 1972, following several years of legal disputes. The fair recorded a net loss of $21.1 million, and bondholders received back about one-third of their original investments. In total, the WFC and other public agencies had spent $83.832 million on permanent improvements to the site during the 1964 fair.

In part because of the 1964 fair's unprofitability, many industrial exhibitors were reluctant to sponsor major exhibits at the next world's fair, Expo 67 in Montreal, Canada, and two other American cities withdrew proposals for world's fairs in the 1960s and 1970s. Citing the 1964 fair, Expo 67's organizers heavily invested in amusement attractions, sought and received BIE approval, and constructed pavilions ahead of schedule. Expo 67 officials also sought positive press coverage for their fair, a significant departure from Moses's negative reaction to every perceived criticism.

== Impact ==
=== Reception ===
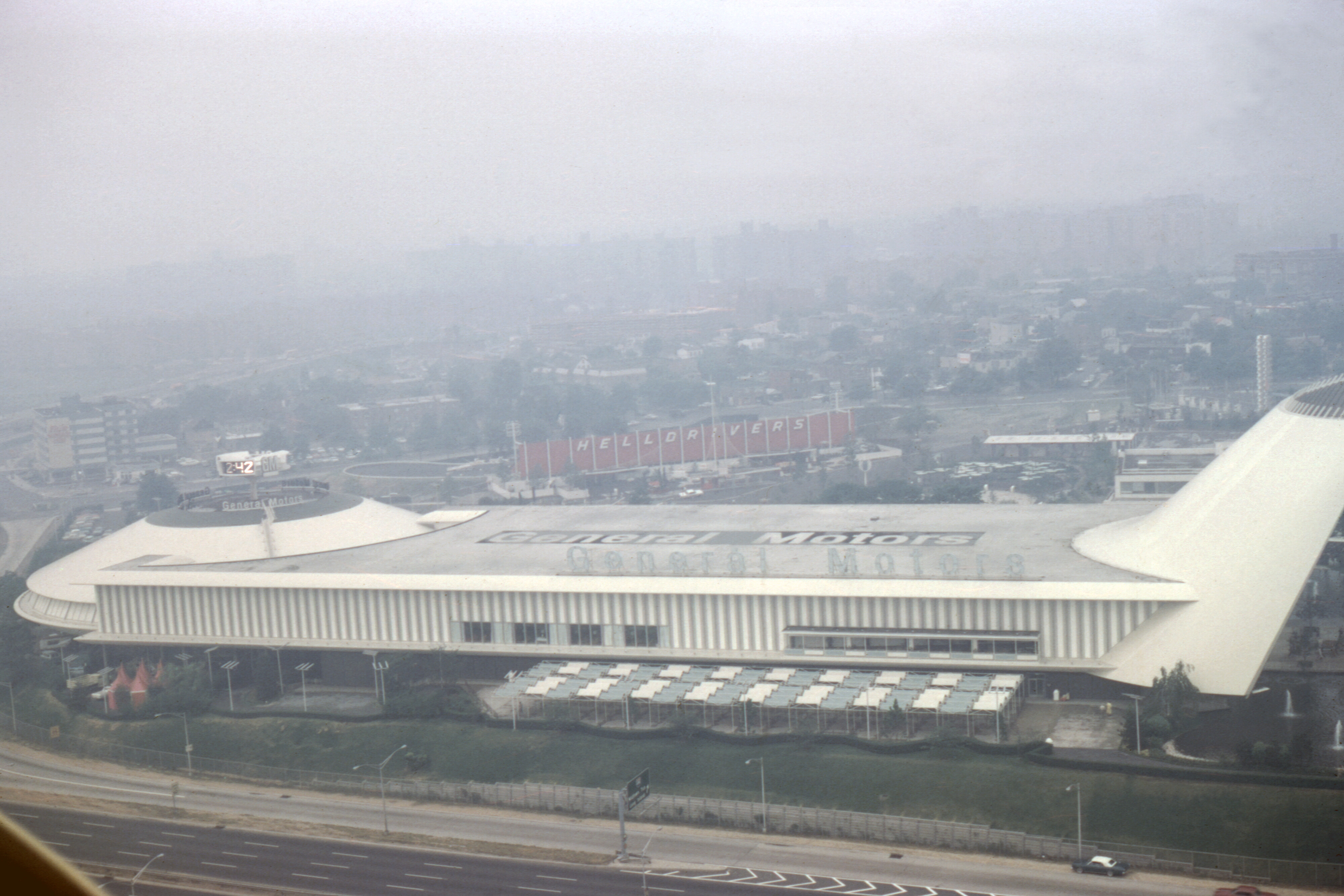
The General Motors Pavilion

==== Contemporaneous ====
Before the fair opened, The Washington Post called it a "mixed boon" to New York City because BIE members had boycotted the fair. In late 1963, just before the fair opened, an Associated Press reporter called it "a big city cousin to the familiar county fair" and said it was becoming one of the United States' most comprehensive exhibits of industries and businesses. A British newspaper called the fair "a great big grown-up Disneyland".

After the fair's opening, Life and Ebony magazines called it one of mankind's largest expositions, and Newsweek wrote the attractions and pavilions were "hard to resist". Several writers criticized the large number of industrial exhibits at the fair, and observers complained about the wastefulness of the pavilions' temporary nature. During the second season, Time magazine wrote the fair was unsuccessful because of long queues, meager exhibits, high prices, and the overwhelmingly large number of attractions for visitors. When the fair closed, a Wall Street Journal reporter wrote it had failed because it "lacked coordination, a common purpose that could be transmitted to the community". Russell Lynes said the concept of the fair was flawed because instant communication between countries was already possible.

There was also commentary on the conflicting architectural styles, which were controversial even before the official opening. In 1961, John Canaday of The New York Times wrote he would be surprised if the fair were not "a mess and disaster architecturally". After the fair opened, Ada Louise Huxtable of The New York Times wrote the fair was architecturally "grotesque", while other critics criticized the structures as befitting Coney Island or a street fair. The critic Vincent Scully Jr., in a Life magazine article, wrote: "If This Is Architecture, God Help Us". In June 1964, Time said the fair had "grace and substance" despite the presence of some "tacky" attractions, a sentiment repeated in The Atlanta Journal-Constitution. The American Institute of Architects gave awards for excellence in design to several pavilions. A Newsday reporter described the fair as "both garish and subtle, tawdry and tasteful, ephemeral and lasting". After the fair closed, architectural critic Wolf Von Eckardt said the fair was "a frightening image of ourselves" because of its "chaotic" architecture.

==== Retrospective ====
In 1967, New York Times reporter Robert Alden wrote the 1964 fair benefited from "participation of private industry on a massive scale" and that more countries were participating in Expo 67. Another Times writer said in 1989: "The 1964 fair was not as self-conscious a portrayal of the future so much as a display of contemporary American achievements". The same year, a Newsday reporter wrote the 1964 fair had occurred at a time when audiences were no longer awed by cultural and technological innovations. Robert A. M. Stern wrote in 1995 the 1964 fair had been so attractive in part because "it was out of place amid the realities of life in the nuclear age".

David W. Dunlap wrote in 2001 the 1964 fair was still ingrained in the public imagination, even though it had been "a tailfin-tacky celebration of jet-age technological hubris" and an "unhappy final chapter" to Moses's career as New York City's main urban planner. According to the author Lawrence R. Samuel, the fair's motto "peace through understanding" was overshadowed by the fair's focus on profits, and a Bloomberg reporter wrote in 2013 the fair had been dominated by corporate exhibitors. In the same year, Joseph Tirella wrote although "peace through understanding continues to elude us", the United States had become more ethnically diverse due to the Immigration and Nationality Act of 1965, which was enacted just before the fair ended.

According to New York Daily News in 2012, the remaining structures from the fair "have provided [Flushing Meadows–Corona Park] with some of its most striking structures". For the fair's 50th anniversary, Smithsonian magazine wrote the fair's "limitless faith in material and social progress" had been counteracted by the social upheaval in the U.S. that took place during the mid-1960s. In 2018, The New York Times wrote the fair was a showcase for futuristic technology and a place where "foreigners could broadcast their best wares and fairgoers could catch a glimpse into their far-off cultures".

=== Influence ===
==== Economic and regional influence ====
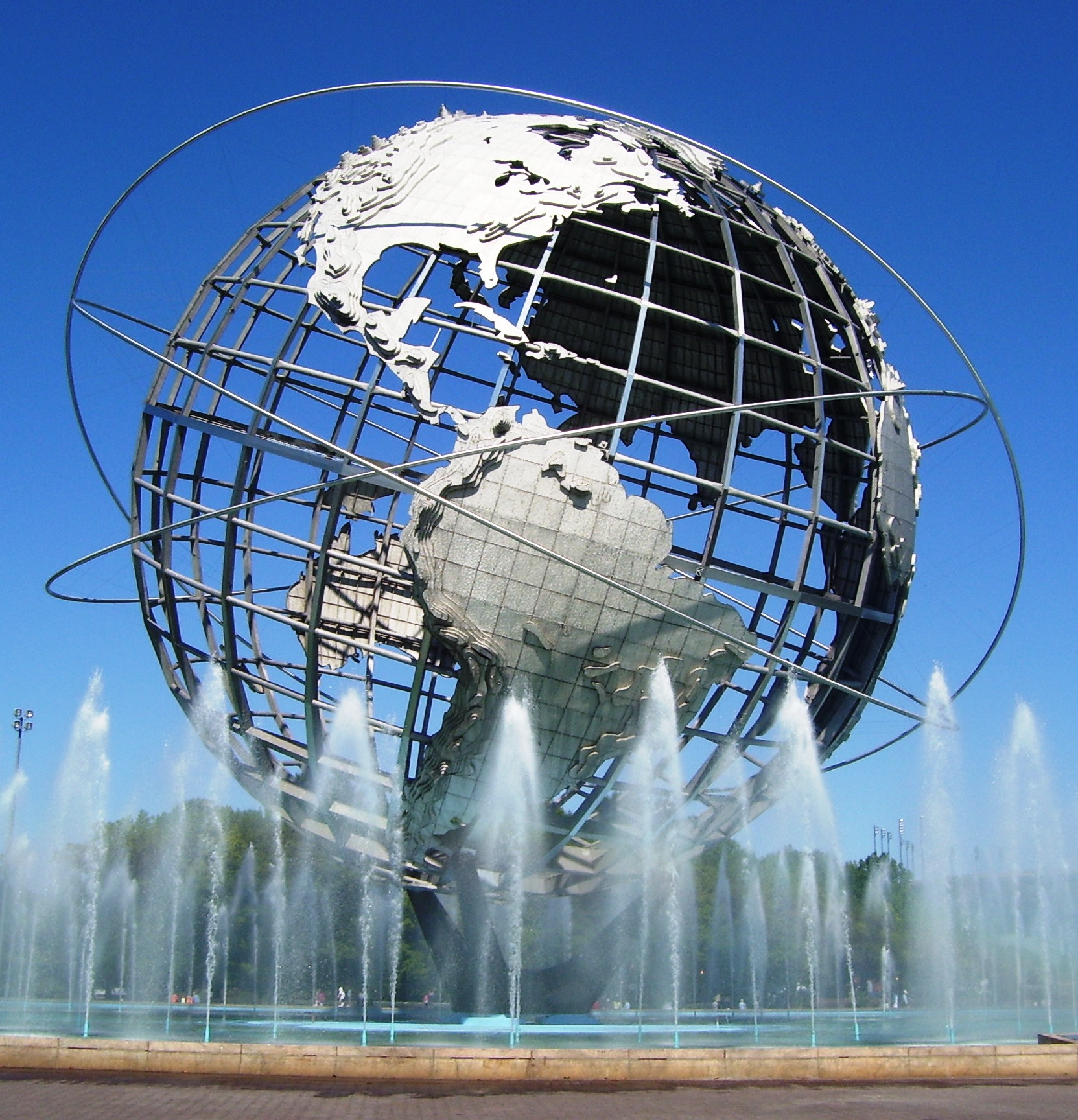
The Unisphere, one of the fair's remaining structures

The fair was credited with increasing tourism in New York City, even before the formal opening. The city's hotels and garages were often overcrowded during the fair's 1964 season. Broadway theaters recorded increased ticket sales, as did other visitor attractions such as the Empire State Building and Radio City Music Hall. Though major department stores and restaurants saw increased business, other merchants reported the fair had not had a measurable effect on their businesses. To avoid crowds, many residents left the city during the fair. Attendance at local amusement parks declined during the fair and some parks, such as Freedomland U.S.A., permanently closed.

At the end of the 1964 season, the city's Convention and Visitors Bureau estimated the city had earned $400 million due to the fair. The Christian Science Monitor wrote in 1965 the fair had only partially benefited the area's economy. After the fair ended, The New York Times estimated it had increased local restaurant profits by eight percent, while stores in Midtown Manhattan saw their profits increase by approximately four percent. The highways leading to the fairground remained in use after the fair's closure, and residential development in Queens increased.

==== Cultural influence and media ====
At the fair's 50th anniversary, a writer for amNewYork Metro wrote it helped influence 21st-century technologies and highlighted Flushing Meadows–Corona Park as an attraction in itself. The fair helped popularize several consumer products such as Belgian waffles and the Ford Mustang. The 1964 World's Fair included several exhibits and technologies that were later included in Disney parks; for example, the Illinois Pavilion's Audio-Animatronic of Abraham Lincoln was so popular Audio-Animatronics were later added to many Disney rides. Walt Disney designed exhibits at the World's Fair; It's a Small World, the Progressland carousel, and the Magic Skyway were later incorporated into Disney parks.

The fair has been the subject of documentary films such as The 1964 World's Fair (1996), After the Fair (2014), and Peace Through Understanding: The 1964–65 New York World's Fair. The fair and its structures have been depicted in popular media; for example, the New York State Pavilion and the Unisphere appear in the films Men in Black and Iron Man 2. Historians have created websites and written books about the fair. The fair has been the subject of several exhibitions at venues including the Flushing Council on Culture and the Arts, Queens Museum, Flushing Town Hall, and the Long Island Museum of American Art, History, and Carriages. The fair's 50th anniversary in 2014 was celebrated with six months of parties, exhibits, and other events across Queens.

Hobbyists have collected memorabilia from the fair, and several collectors have founded the World's Fair Collectors Society. Collectors have preserved objects such as bracelets, medallions, ponchos, purses, and pocketknives. The Smithsonian Institution and Queens Museum also own objects from the World's Fair, and there have been efforts to develop a World's Fair museum.

== See also ==
- Exhibition of the Industry of All Nations – 1853 World's Fair in New York City
- List of world expositions
- List of world's fairs
