= Skyride (Six Flags Great Adventure) =

Dual gondola lift

Skyway
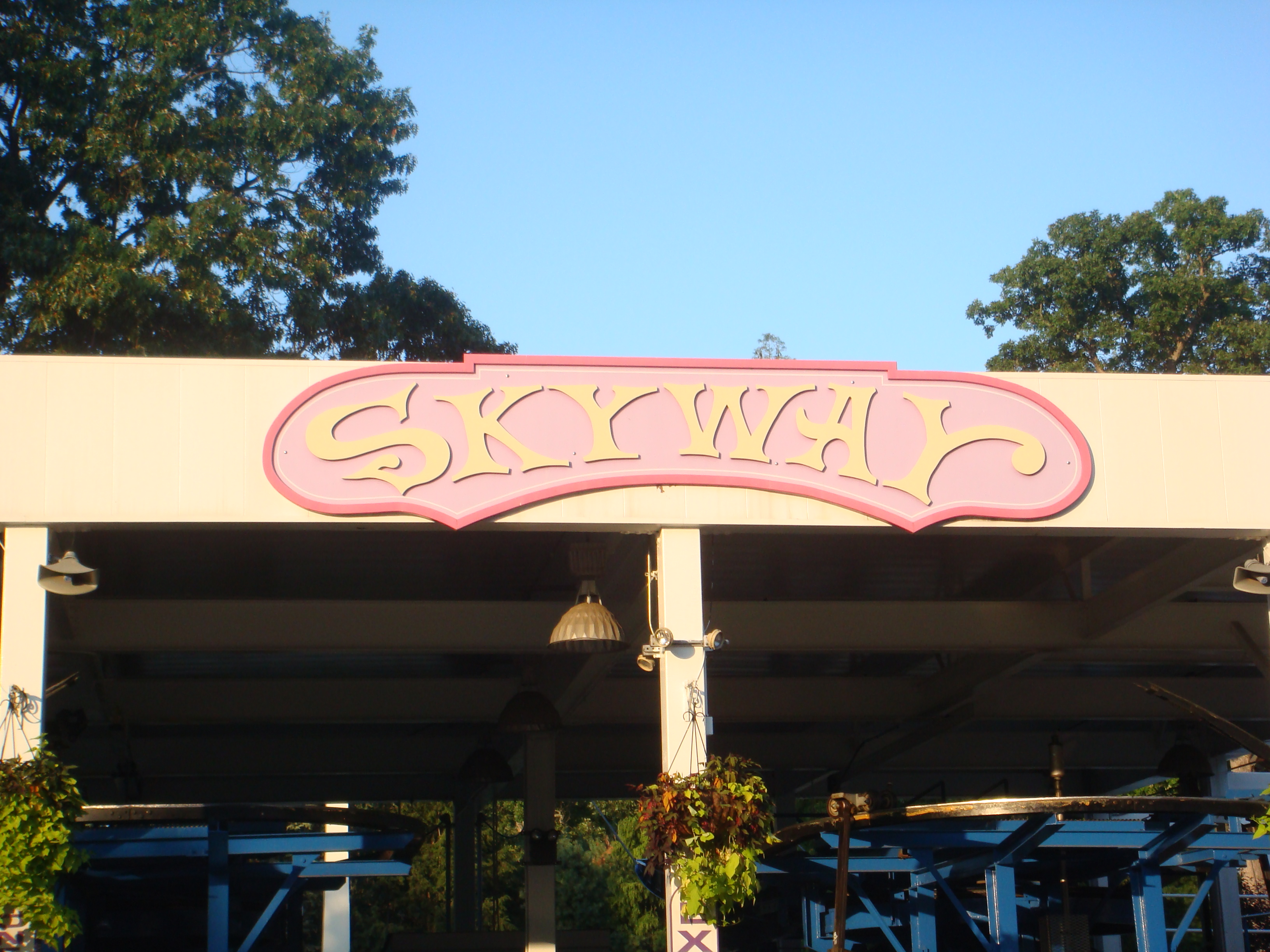

Six Flags Great Adventure
- Name: Skyride
- Area: Frontier Adventures
- Status: Removed
- Opening date: July 4, 1974
- Closing date: January 1, 2024

Ride statistics
- Attraction type: Gondola lift
- Manufacturer: Von Roll
- Model: Dual gondola
- Duration: 4:00
- Height restriction: 42 in (107 cm)

Skyride was a dual gondola lift at Six Flags Great Adventure in Jackson Township, New Jersey. The Skyride carried passengers on a 1/3 mile, four-minute trip between the Fantasy Forest and the Frontier Adventures sections of the park. It was one of the few rides to allow park guests under 42 inches (1,100 mm) in height to ride (including children and infants who cannot sit up by themselves). The ride closed permanently after the 2023 season and was removed in 2024 and 2025.

== History ==
It was originally built for the 1964 New York World's Fair as a classic Von Roll type 101. It was then moved to Great Adventure after the fair closed. The Skyride originally had 30 cars per side at the World's Fair with a launch interval of 12 seconds. At Six Flags, it ran up to 20 cars per side with a launch interval of 25 seconds. On November 14, 2024, the park announced that the Skyride would be removed for future development, despite fan opposition and a petition to save the ride.

== The ride ==
The ride consisted of two continuous cable loops, held up by six evenly-dispersed support towers. The cars hung from a moving cable, and each car could carry up to four passengers in two rows (or 680 pounds). At each station, a large bullwheel with a pulley-like groove rotated the direction of the cable. Incoming cars were transferred from the moving cable to a stationary steel track, along which the wheels of each car glided. As each car entered the station, it was "caught" and brought to a stop by a park employee, who then held the car in place and opened the door for passengers to exit. The car was then pushed to the other side of the wheel, where another employee steadied it for new passengers to enter. The door then was closed and locked and the car moved to the launcher. This held the car in place until the proper launch interval has passed. The car was then dispatched (either electronically or manually) onto a cable, which pulled it to the next station.

== The stations ==
In addition to loading and unloading the cars, each station performed a substantially different function. The Fantasy Forest station was the "Drive" station, where its bullwheel pulled the cables for the ride. The bullwheel was driven by a large electric motor, with backup Volkswagen Beetle motors. The station was also the main storage location for the cars.

The Frontier Adventures station was the "Tension" station, where its bullwheel was linked to a 14-ton counterweight underneath the station. The counterweight kept the cable taught and on the towers. The Frontier Adventures station was not wheelchair accessible, so guests who used wheelchairs boarded at the Fantasy Forest station for a round trip ride (which was not otherwise allowed).

== Limitations and hazards ==
The Skyride did not run when winds exceeded 25 miles per hour (40 km/h) or during inclement weather. It was one of the first rides to close when severe weather approached the park, and one of the last rides to reopen once the weather passed. The ride was one of the most difficult rides in the park to operate due to its manual operations and the continuous motion of the cable. It required no less than four employees to operate. Further, two employees (one unloader at each station) needed to possess sufficient strength to catch and stop the cars, weighing up to over 1000 lbs. (453 kg.) when they arrived at the station at speeds of 12 mph. Additionally, over time as the ride aged, maintenance became increasingly difficult as spare parts were no longer available and had to be custom-made.

== See also ==
- 1964 New York World's Fair pavilions
