= Wonderworld (musical) =

Wonderworld is a musical with lyrics by Stanley Styne and music by Jule Styne written specifically for presentation at the 1964 New York World's Fair's huge 11,000-seat amphitheatre. The large-scale "aqua-stage spectacle" used 250 performers and starred Chita Rivera. The expensive show filed for bankruptcy after two months.

== History ==
The production was conceived and staged by Leon Leonidoff, a senior producer at Radio City Music Hall. With admission prices ranging from $1.00 to $3.00, the $2 million production was presented four times a day Monday through Thursdays and five times a day on Saturdays and Sundays in the 11,000-seat Art Deco amphitheatre constructed for the 1939 New York World's Fair. It used 250 performers, including Chita Rivera alternating with Gretchen Wyler, and Ted Scott. The choreographer and assistant director was Michael Kidd.

Billed as an "aqua-stage spectacle", the 90-minute production opened in May 1964. It involved high divers, motorcycles, clowns, a sportscar ballet, a man propelled by a rocket and elaborate water scenes staged in the pool with a "giant waterfall". The Fair's official description of the musical noted: "The new production takes place on a turntable 75 feet in diameter, one of the largest in the world; in a swimming pool in front of the stage; and on movable platforms that shuttle back and forth over the pool. On either side of the stage are acoustical shells for an orchestra and choral groups."

The costume designer for the show was Alvin Colt. He commented that Leonidoff had the designs done in Paris, France by Erté, but when they arrived, Kidd said that he could not use them, stating "They can't dance in these. For instance, I'm doing a sports number and Erté's idea about a girl playing tennis was to put a headdress on her with tennis balls and rackets." Colt went on to say that Wonderworld was "full of crazy things, some quite unbelievable: a water ballet with costumes full of electric lights ... hundreds of dancers, swimmers, singers, clowns, and so forth, and scores of costumes."

Songs in the show included "Wonderworld" and "Welcome". A bankruptcy petition was filed at the end of June 1964, and the show received 250 performances before closing the week of July 6 due to poor business at the Fair's Lake Amusement Area. It lost $2,500,000. Max Allentuck, the General Manager of the Fair, said the "big production wasn't working" and they wanted to try a different kind of show. A 50-minute comedy-song show with a cast of 20 replaced it. None of the Wonderworld principals were involved in the new show.

== See also ==
- Billy Rose's Aquacade
