= Column of Jerash =

Roman artifact in New York City

Coordinates: 40.7465°N 73.8423°W

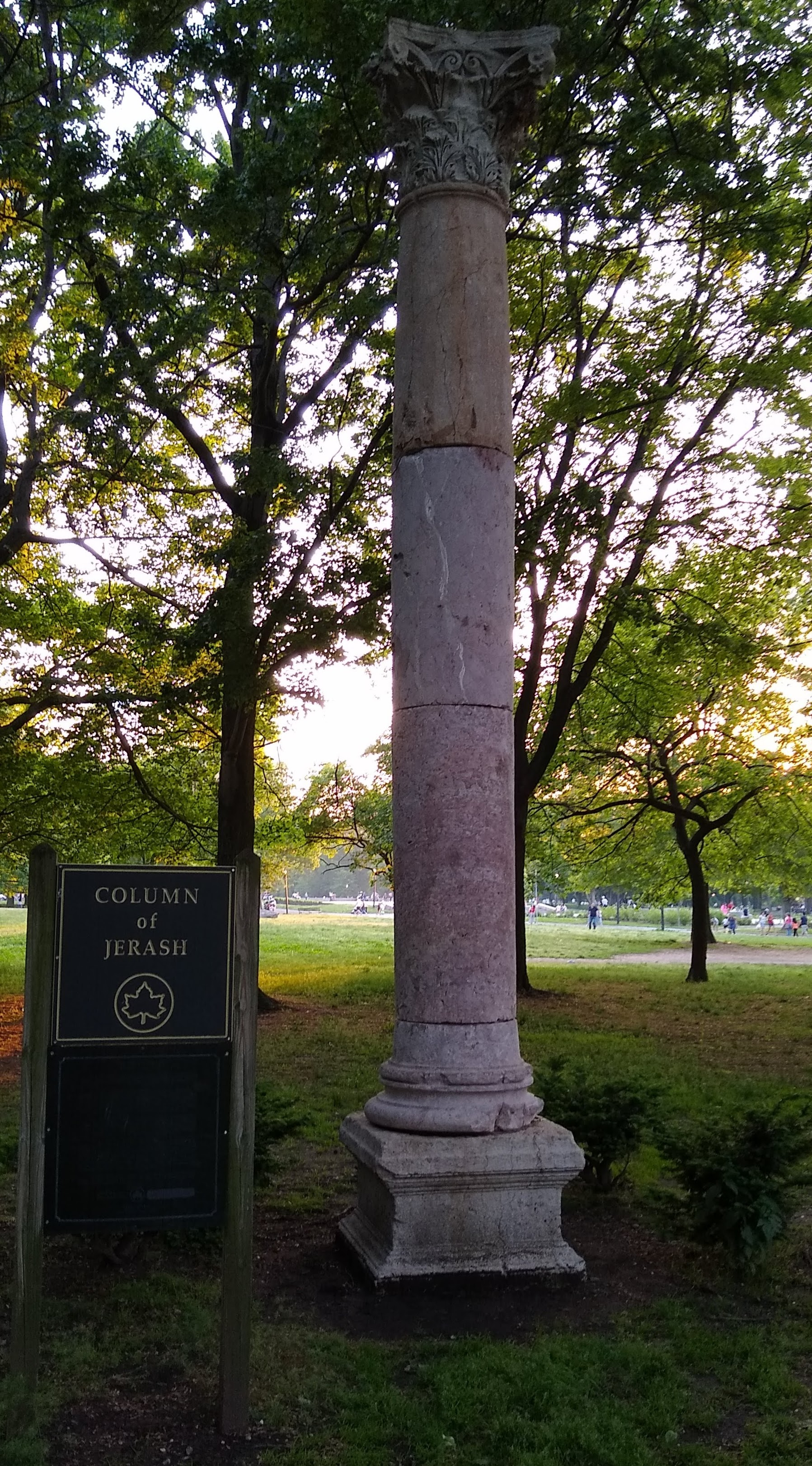
Column of Jerash in Flushing Meadows–Corona Park in 2022

The Column of Jerash, also known as the Whispering Column of Jerash, is a monument in Flushing Meadows–Corona Park, Queens, New York City. The column was originally constructed in the second century AD under Roman rule in Jerash, Jordan. The column has been in Flushing Meadows–Corona Park since 1964, when it was gifted to the city by Hussein of Jordan for the 1964–65 New York World's Fair.

== Structure and origin ==
The column originates from Gerasa (ancient Jerash), a city in the Ancient Roman province of Syria. It is believed to have been erected by the Romans around 120 AD, during a period of great prosperity in the city. The column measures 4.94 metres (16.2 ft) high and 0.64 metres (2.1 ft) in diameter, consistent with the proportions of Corinthian columns, and consists of three marble drums, an Attic base, and a Corinthian top. Its total mass is 6,240 kilograms (6.14 long tons).

It has been stated that the column originates from the Temple of Artemis in Jerash—a temple dedicated to Jerash's patron goddess, Artemis; this association has also been published in the 1964–65 World's Fair Corporation Archive, in travel brochures, and on the column's dedicatory plaque. However, a 2015 study casts doubt on this claim because of various discrepancies between the column of Jerash and columns of the temple. For instance, the other columns are stated to be over 13 metres (43 ft) tall, nearly three times the height of the column in the park. Additionally, as columns were reused in different buildings, the exact building in Jerash from which the column originates is unknown.

Jerash was struck by a strong earthquake in 749, which caused significant damage to the city's ancient structures. In the aftermath of this earthquake, many pieces of ancient columns were reused in construction. Other remnants would later be excavated and removed during reconstruction of Jerash in the 1960s.

== World's Fair ==
The Column of Jerash was recovered during reconstruction of Jerash in the early 1960s. American stockbroker Hugh D. Auchincloss Jr. met King Hussein of Jordan in 1962 and encouraged the participation of Jordan at the 1964–1965 New York World's Fair. Hussein agreed to participate and had the column sent as a diplomatic gift to the World's Fair. Jordan would be one of 36 foreign countries with exhibitions at the fair. However, the column delivered to the World's Fair was smaller than the column originally offered, which instead measured 9.75 metres (32.0 ft) in height and 16,329.3 kilograms (36,000 lb) in mass. This substitution, accepted by World's Fair vice president Charles Poletti and director Lionel Harris, was not revealed to World's Fair president Robert Moses. The column's acquisition was announced in May 1963. King Hussein formally dedicated the column to the city at the opening of the World's Fair; it was gifted as a permanent monument to remain on display in the park beyond the duration of the fair, as noted in the fair's records.

During the World's Fair, the column stood alongside the Jordan Pavilion, which housed a mural and poem portraying religious heritage and was designed to resemble sand dunes characteristic of the Jordanian desert. The pavilion, together with the American-Israel pavilion, was a source of controversy between Israel and Jordan at the fair amid regional tensions in the Middle East. The Column of Jerash was a major attraction at the fair. Although various structures of the World's Fair were disassembled following its conclusion in October 1965, the Column of Jerash was preserved in the park, true to its dedication.

== As a monument ==
The Column of Jerash remains in Flushing Meadows–Corona Park, to the east of the Unisphere, and is one of few exhibitions from the World's Fair still on display. In 2001, a marker commemorating the gift was placed at the base of the column. The History Channel undertook a $20,000 project to refurbish the column in 2004–05, amid concerns about weather conditions (such as acid rain) and structural integrity, as part of a larger collaboration with the city to restore and maintain various historic sites. In 2008, the column's cracks were filled with mortar as a protective measure against water damage. The New York City Department of Parks and Recreation added a new plaque in 2011 to supplement the ancient plaque and draw increased attention to the column from park visitors.

The column is believed to be the second-oldest monument in New York City, behind only Cleopatra's Needle in Central Park.

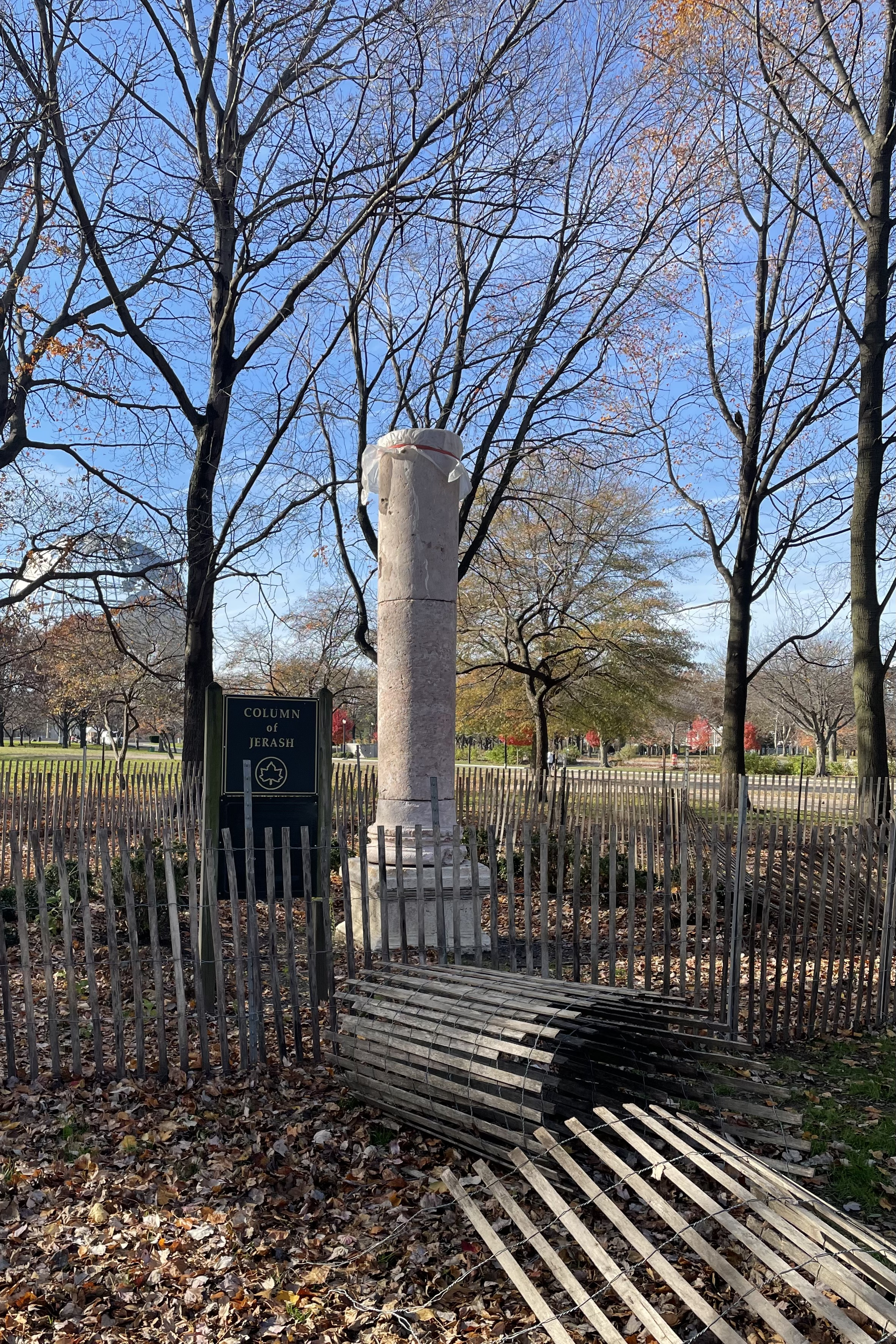
Pictured is the Column of Jerash with its upper drum and capital missing as of November 24, 2023.
