= National Register of Historic Places listings in Clark County, Wisconsin =

Location of Clark County in Wisconsin

This is a list of the National Register of Historic Places listings in Clark County, Wisconsin. It is intended to provide a comprehensive listing of entries in the National Register of Historic Places that are located in Clark County, Wisconsin. The locations of National Register properties for which the latitude and longitude coordinates are included below may be seen in a map.

There are 21 properties and districts listed on the National Register in the county. Another property was once listed but has been removed.

This National Park Service list is complete through NPS recent listings posted August 8, 2025.

== Current listings ==
	Name on the Register	Image	Date listed	Location	City or town	Description
1	Forrest D. and Marian Calway House	Forrest D. and Marian Calway House	November 15, 2005 (#05001297)	318 E. Fourth St. 44°33′39″N 90°35′30″W	Neillsville	1917 Colonial Revival home with Arts and Crafts influences, built for court reporter Calway and Judge O'Neill's daughter Marian by Forrest's father Samuel, a blacksmith, carpenter and contractor.
2	Clark County Jail	Clark County Jail	December 8, 1978 (#78000080)	215 E. 5th St. 44°33′37″N 90°35′36″W	Neillsville	The 1897 Richardsonian Romanesque building includes both cells for prisoners and a Victorian home for the sheriff's family.
3	Charles and Theresa Cornelius House	Charles and Theresa Cornelius House	September 18, 2013 (#13000749)	118 Clay St. 44°33′22″N 90°36′01″W	Neillsville	Large house with porte-cochère and automobile house, designed by Anton Billmeyer of Wisconsin Rapids in Queen Anne Free Classic style and built in 1909. Charles was a banker, lumberman, and civic leader.
4	Decatur and Kate Dickinson House	Decatur and Kate Dickinson House	March 27, 2007 (#07000223)	411 State St. 44°33′34″N 90°35′34″W	Neillsville	This Queen Anne style home was built for businessman Dickinson and his family in 1891.
5	First Church of Christ, Scientist	First Church of Christ, Scientist	March 31, 2003 (#03000168)	132 E Fourth St. 44°33′31″N 90°35′44″W	Neillsville	1916 Neoclassical Revival building in the form of a Greek cross.
6	Charles Foote House	Charles Foote House	November 13, 1997 (#97001443)	W 5055 US 10; 44°33′09″N 90°33′58″W	Pine Valley	Rural 1878 brick Italianate farmhouse on Pleasant Ridge east of Neillsville. Charles was a Civil War veteran, town treasurer, and member of the Clark County Agricultural Society.
7	Herman M. and Hanna Hediger House	Herman M. and Hanna Hediger House	August 27, 2013 (#13000651)	8 Grand Ave. 44°33′12″N 90°35′55″W	Neillsville	The Swiss immigrant Hedigers designed this house in the style of a Swiss chalet and brought a cabinet-maker and a mason from Switzerland to help build it. Herman had immigrated around 1921 and worked as a cheesemaker at Christie and Neillsville.
8	John and Maria Hein House	John and Maria Hein House	April 12, 2006 (#06000277)	824 Hewett St. 44°33′48″N 90°35′44″W	Neillsville	2.5 story Queen Anne style home with 2-story porch, built in 1892 for the Heins, German immigrants who owned a stave and heading mill and a dry goods and grocery store.
9	Neillsville Downtown Historic District	Neillsville Downtown Historic District	June 15, 2000 (#00000701)	500 Block Hewett St. and 118 W. Sixth St. 44°33′38″N 90°35′46″W	Neillsville	Many old brick commercial buildings, including the 1872 Hewett and Woods General Store, the 1887 Queen Anne Clark County Bank, and the 1895 Italianate Sniteman Drug store.
10	Neillsville Masonic Temple Lodge No. 163	Neillsville Masonic Temple Lodge No. 163	October 6, 2004 (#04001134)	316 Hewett St. 44°33′40″N 90°35′49″W	Neillsville	1928 Masonic Lodge, with bowling alley in basement, now used as an Assembly of God church.
11	Neillsville Post Office	Neillsville Post Office	October 24, 2000 (#00001257)	619 Hewett St. 44°33′40″N 90°35′46″W	Neillsville	The simple building constructed by the PWA in 1940 contains a mural depicting the 1854 election of Neillsville as the seat of Clark County.
12	Neillsville Standpipe	Neillsville Standpipe	September 9, 2013 (#13000711)	325 E. 4th St. 44°33′32″N 90°35′26″W	Neillsville	Small-town water tower at the highest point in town, built in 1926, consisting of a steel water tank made by the Pittsburgh-Des Moines Steel Co. encased in a 95 foot slip-form concrete tower built by Tierweiler Bros. of Marshfield.
13	Omaha Hotel	Omaha Hotel	March 20, 2013 (#13000101)	317 W. 7th St. 44°33′41″N 90°35′59″W	Neillsville	Modest 2-story brick hotel built by the Weber brothers in 1892 near the Chicago, St. Paul, Minneapolis, and Omaha depot, with guest rooms upstairs and saloon and dining room downstairs.
14	Owen High School	Owen High School	August 11, 2004 (#04000848)	101 East Third St. 44°56′51″N 90°33′53″W	Owen	The school opened in 1921, also hosting the public library and community events for many years. The building was designed by William Alban of Eau Claire in the Prairie School style, and designed for students to move from one specialized classroom (e.g. a lab) to another, which was a rather new idea at the time.
15	Robert Schofield House	Robert Schofield House	September 9, 1982 (#82000643)	303 W. Schofield Ave. 44°45′46″N 90°36′04″W	Greenwood	Wood-frame Italianate-style home with an oak and mahogany elliptical-spiralled staircase and original carbide-gas chandeliers, constructed by 1890 for lumberman and farmer Schofield.
16	The Silver Dome Ballroom	The Silver Dome Ballroom	June 27, 1997 (#97000647)	US 10, 1 mi (1.6 km). W of jct. of US 10 and Collier Rd. 44°33′54″N 90°41′57″W	Hewett	This 1933 rural dance hall has hosted performers from Howie Sturtz to Gene Autry and Count Basie.
17	Charles C. and Katharyn Sniteman House	Charles C. and Katharyn Sniteman House	September 29, 2011 (#11000716)	319 Hewett St. 44°33′31″N 90°35′48″W	Neillsville	Home constructed around 1915 for Neillsville's long-time pharmacist. Designed in the Prairie style by architect George Awsumb.
18	George W. and Sarah Trogner House	George W. and Sarah Trogner House	September 1, 2005 (#05000953)	108 Grand Ave. 44°33′19″N 90°35′52″W	Neillsville	Highly intact 1897 Queen Anne home with Eastlake detailing, designed and built by Civil War veteran, wagon builder, mill owner, and carpenter Trogner for his own family.
19	William B. and Jennie Tufts House	William B. and Jennie Tufts House	January 20, 2012 (#11001045)	321 E. 4th St. 44°33′32″N 90°35′32″W	Neillsville	Spanish Eclectic house built in 1934. Tufts was a flight instructor for the U. S. Navy during World War I and the manager of Lynn Mutual Insurance.
20	Wisconsin Pavilion	Wisconsin Pavilion	February 14, 2012 (#12000021)	1201 E. Division St. 44°33′11″N 90°34′48″W	Neillsville	Modernist-styled pavilion which showcased Wisconsin products at the 1964 New York World's Fair.
21	Woodland Hotel	Woodland Hotel	May 10, 2016 (#16000240)	207 N. Central Ave. 44°56′56″N 90°33′52″W	Owen	2-story hotel designed by Claude & Starck and built for the John S. Owen Lumber company in 1906.

== Former listings ==
	Name on the Register	Image	Date listed	Date removed	Location	City or town	Description
1	Grand Avenue Bridge	Grand Avenue Bridge	December 6, 1984 (#84000688)	February 18, 1987	Grand Ave.	Neillsville	Overhead truss highway bridge built of cast and wrought iron in 1894, with Pratt truss design.

== See also ==
- List of National Historic Landmarks in Wisconsin
- National Register of Historic Places listings in Wisconsin
- Listings in neighboring counties: Chippewa, Eau Claire, Jackson, Marathon, Taylor, Wood
