= Hamilton Hotel =

Hamilton Hotel may refer to:

- Hamilton Hotel (Bermuda), a former hotel in Bermuda
- Hamilton Princess & Beach Club, another hotel in Bermuda, formerly known as The Princess
- Hamilton Hotel (Itaewon), a hotel in Itaewon, Seoul, South Korea
- Hamilton Hotel, Laredo, Texas, listed on the NRHP in Webb County, Texas
- Hamilton Hotel, former name for the Omaha Hotel, listed on the NRHP in Clark County, Wisconsin
- Hamilton Hotel (Portland, Oregon), former hotel in downtown Portland, Oregon
- Hamilton Hotel (St. Louis), listed on the National Register of Historic Places (NRHP) in St. Louis County, Missouri
- Hamilton Hotel (Washington, D.C.), listed on the NRHP in Washington, D.C.
