= Dickinson House =

Dickinson House may refer to:

in the United States (by state then city)

- Dickinson House (Grove Hill, Alabama), listed on the National Register of Historic Places (NRHP) in Clarke County, Alabama
- Dickinson-Moore House, Arkansas City, Arkansas, listed on the NRHP in Desha County
- Edward Dickinson House, Batesville, Arkansas, listed on the NRHP in Independence County
- John Dickinson House, Dover, Delaware, a U.S. National Historic Landmark and NRHP-listed in Kent County
- Emily Dickinson House, Amherst, Massachusetts, a U.S. National Historic Landmark and NRHP-listed in Hampshire County
- Dickinson-Pillsbury-Witham House, Georgetown, Massachusetts, listed on the NRHP in Essex County
- Dickinson House (Alloway, New Jersey), listed on the NRHP in Salem County
- Gen. Philemon Dickinson House, Trenton, New Jersey, listed on the NRHP in Mercer County
- Dickinson Estate Historic District, Brattleboro, Vermont, listed on the NRHP in Windham County
- Dickinson-Milbourn House, Jonesville, Virginia, listed on the NRHP in Lee County
- Decatur and Kate Dickinson House, Neillsville, Wisconsin, listed on the NRHP in Clark County
