= List of buildings in Laredo, Texas =

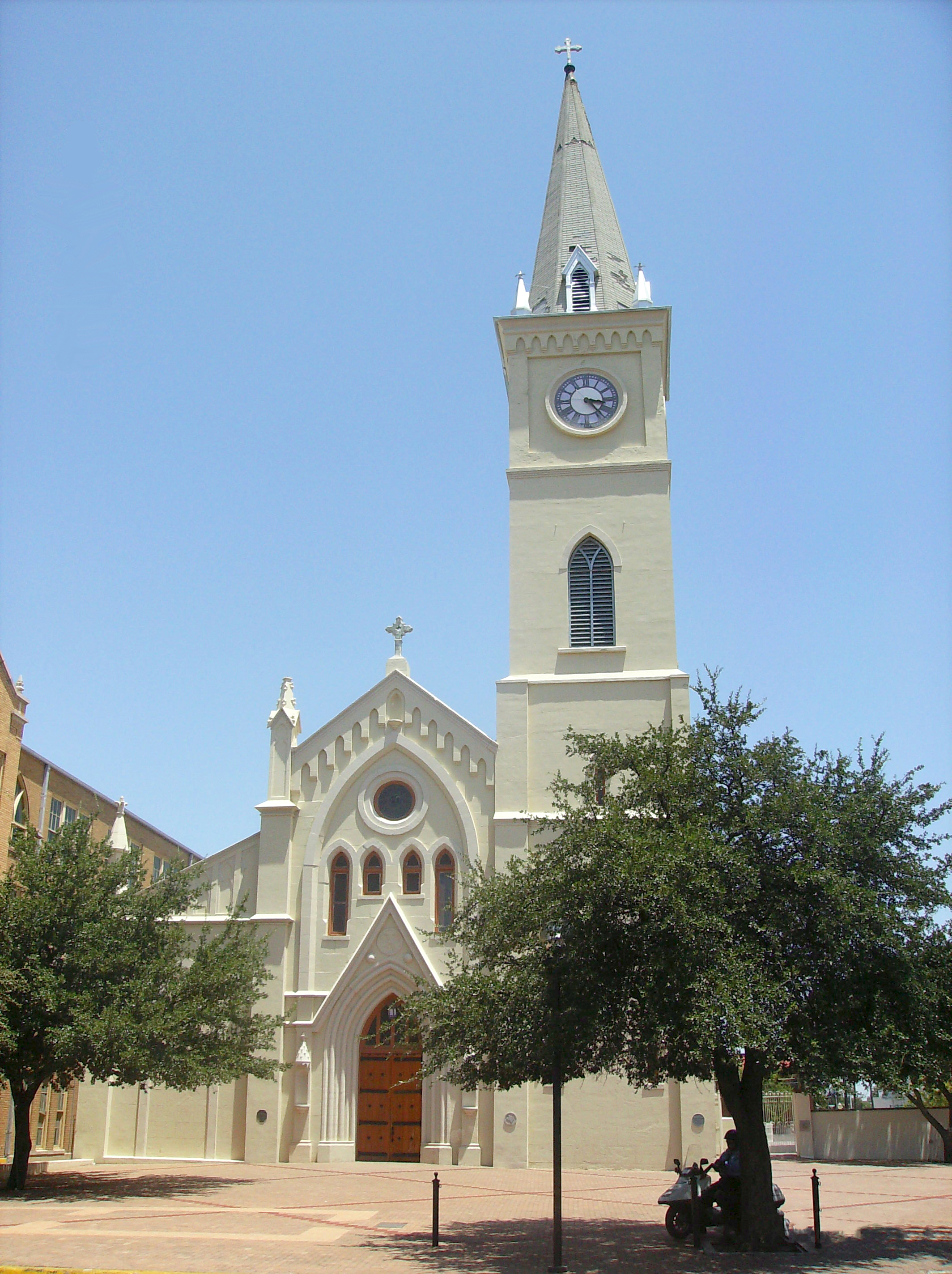
The San Agustin Cathedral

This is a list of the tallest and largest buildings in Laredo, Texas. Laredo is the county seat and most populated city in Webb County, Texas. The city has over 230,000 residents and there are over 730,000 residents in the Laredo-Nuevo Laredo Metropolitan Area.

== Tallest buildings ==
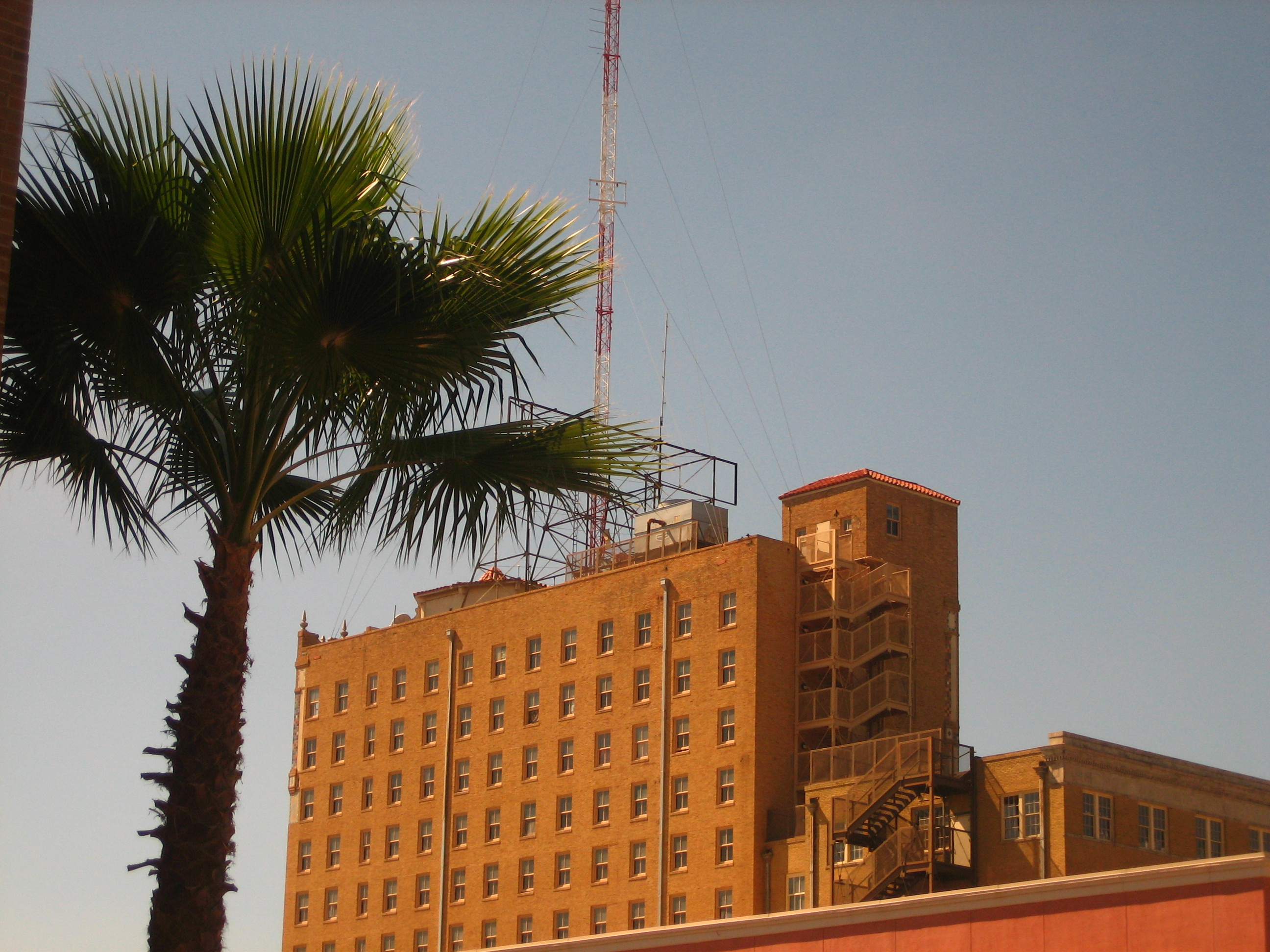
Hamilton Hotel

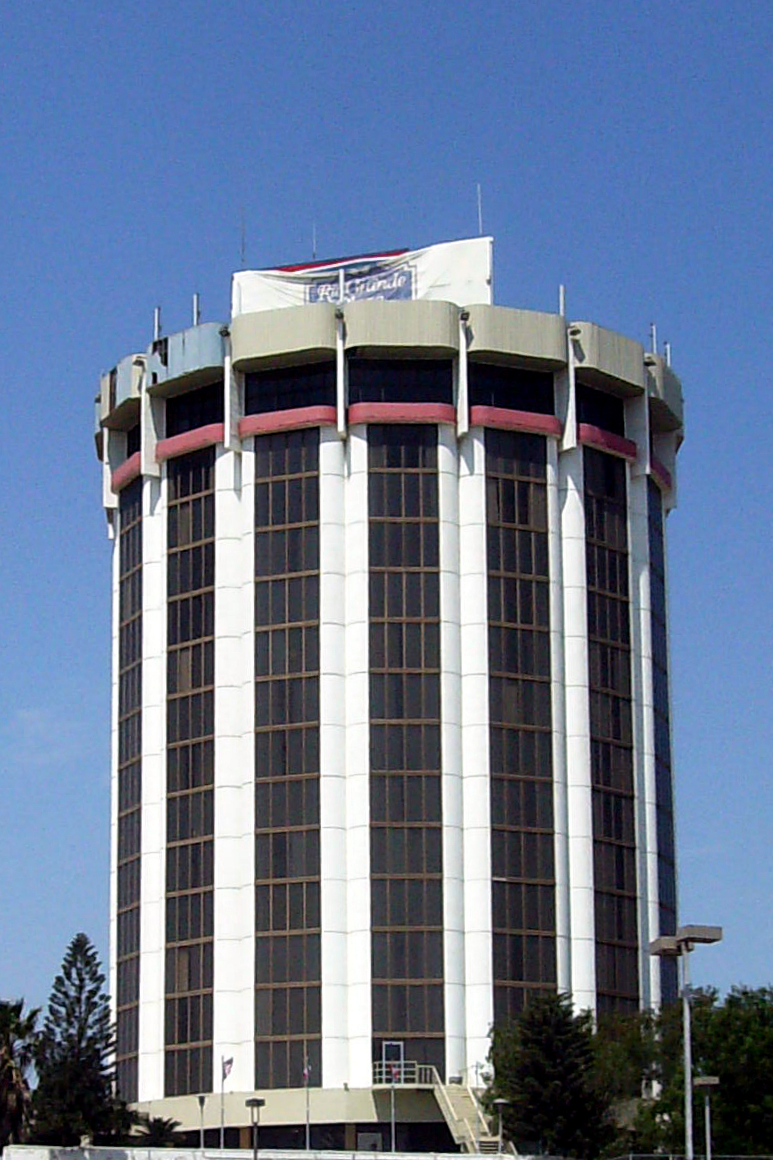
Rio Grande Plaza Hotel

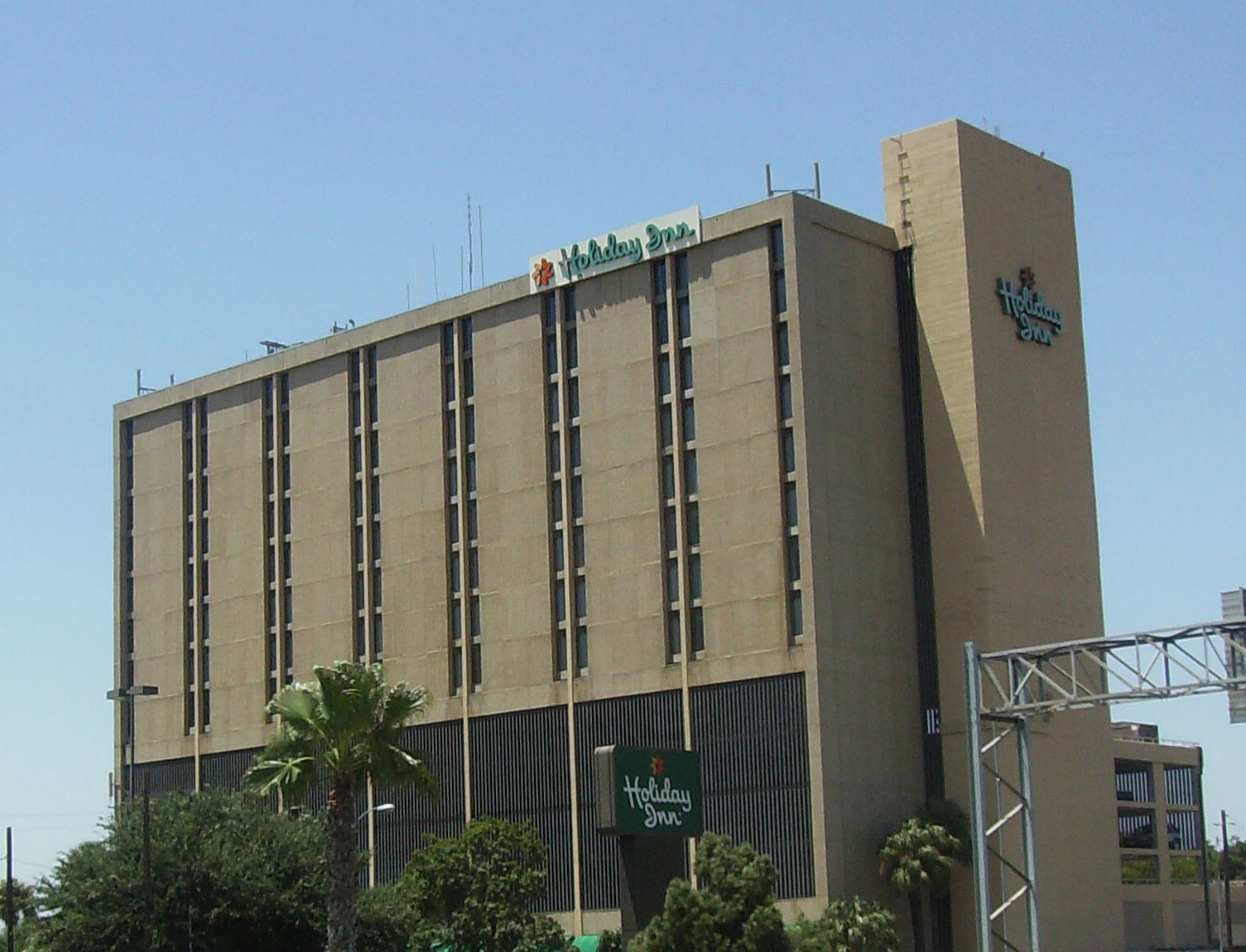
The Holiday Inn

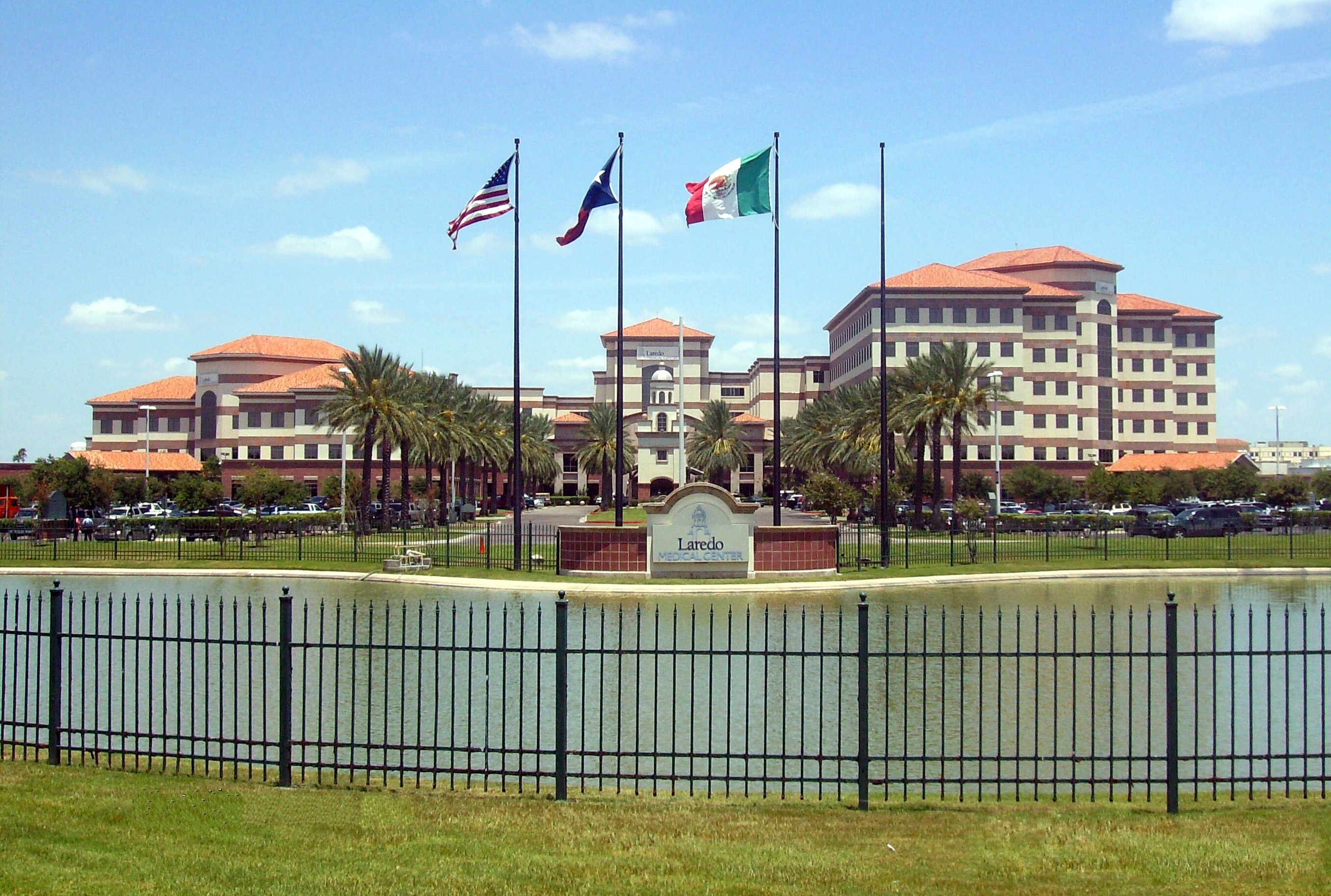
The Laredo Medical Center

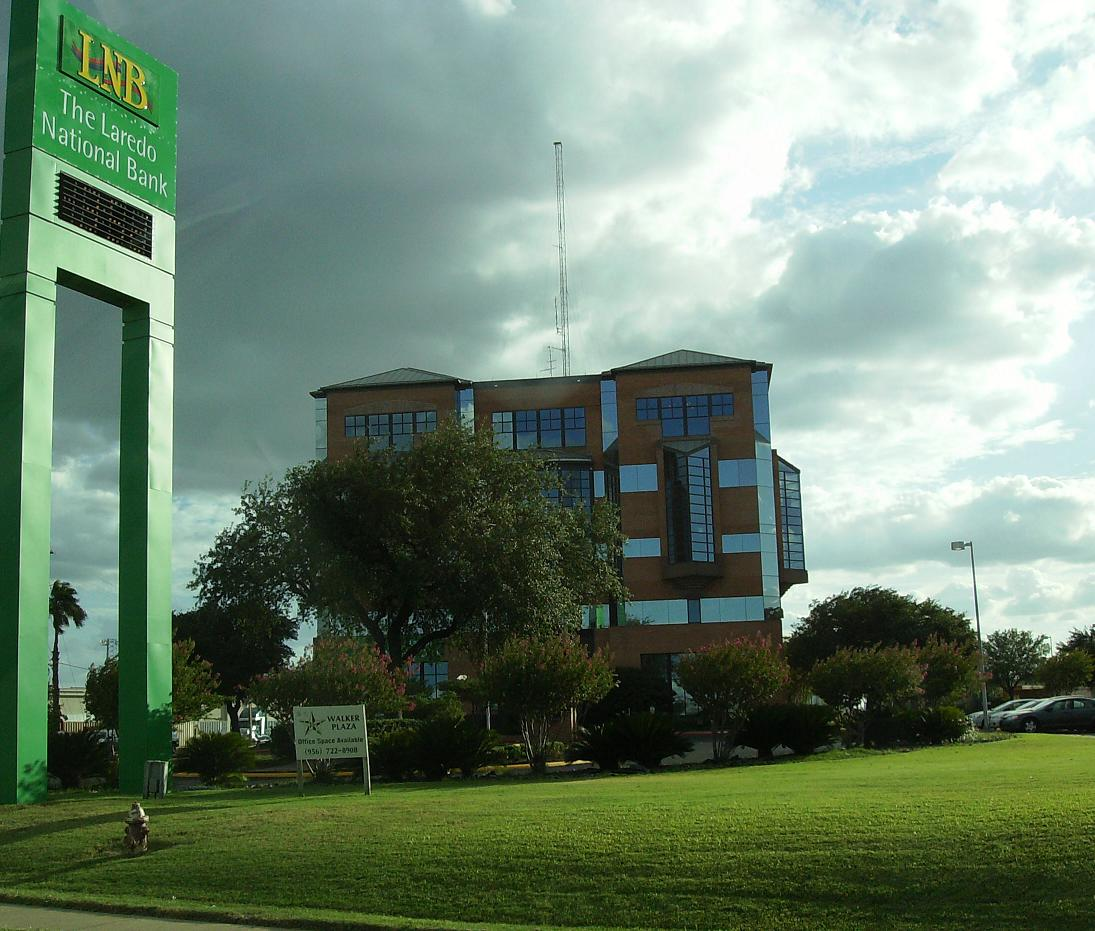
Walker Plaza

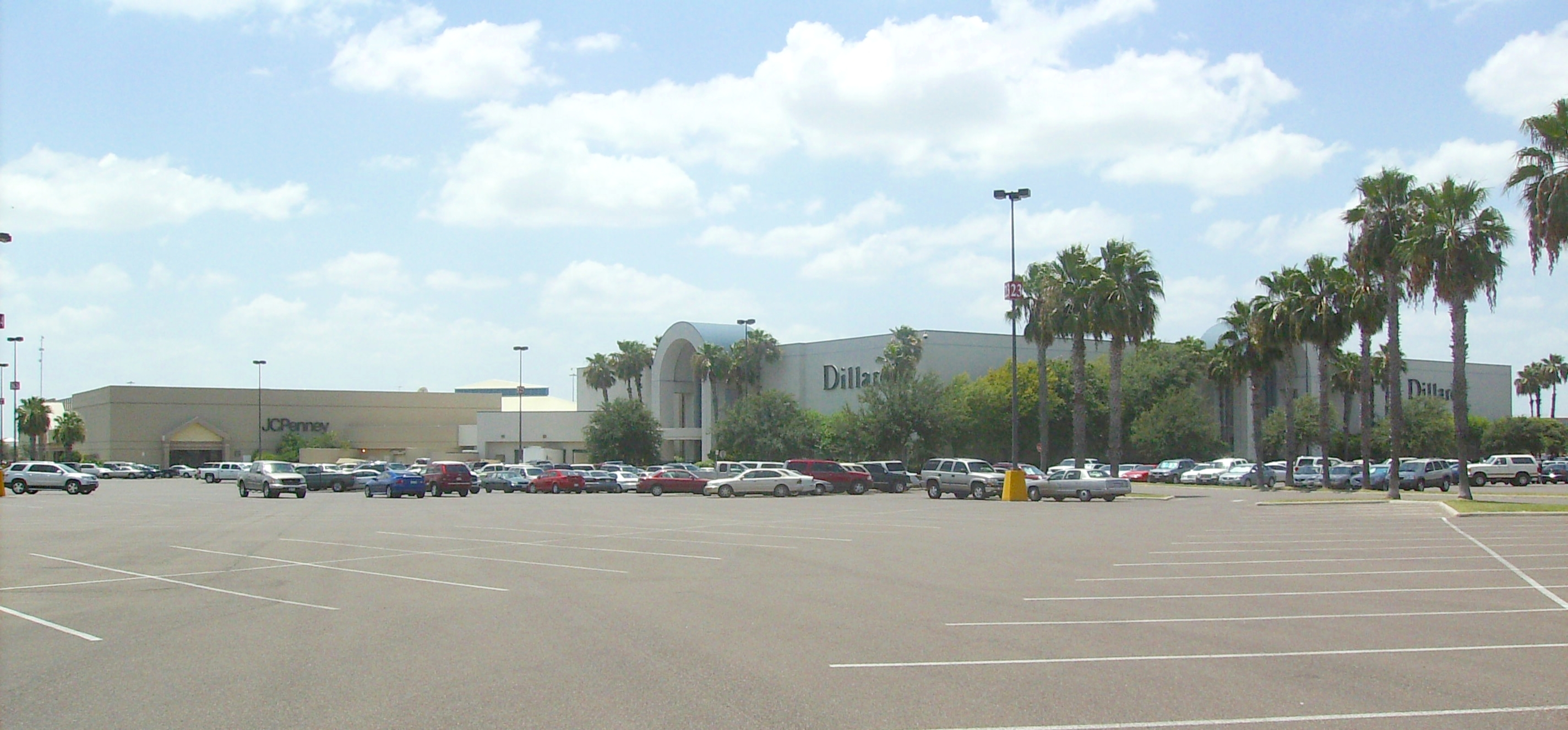
Mall del Norte

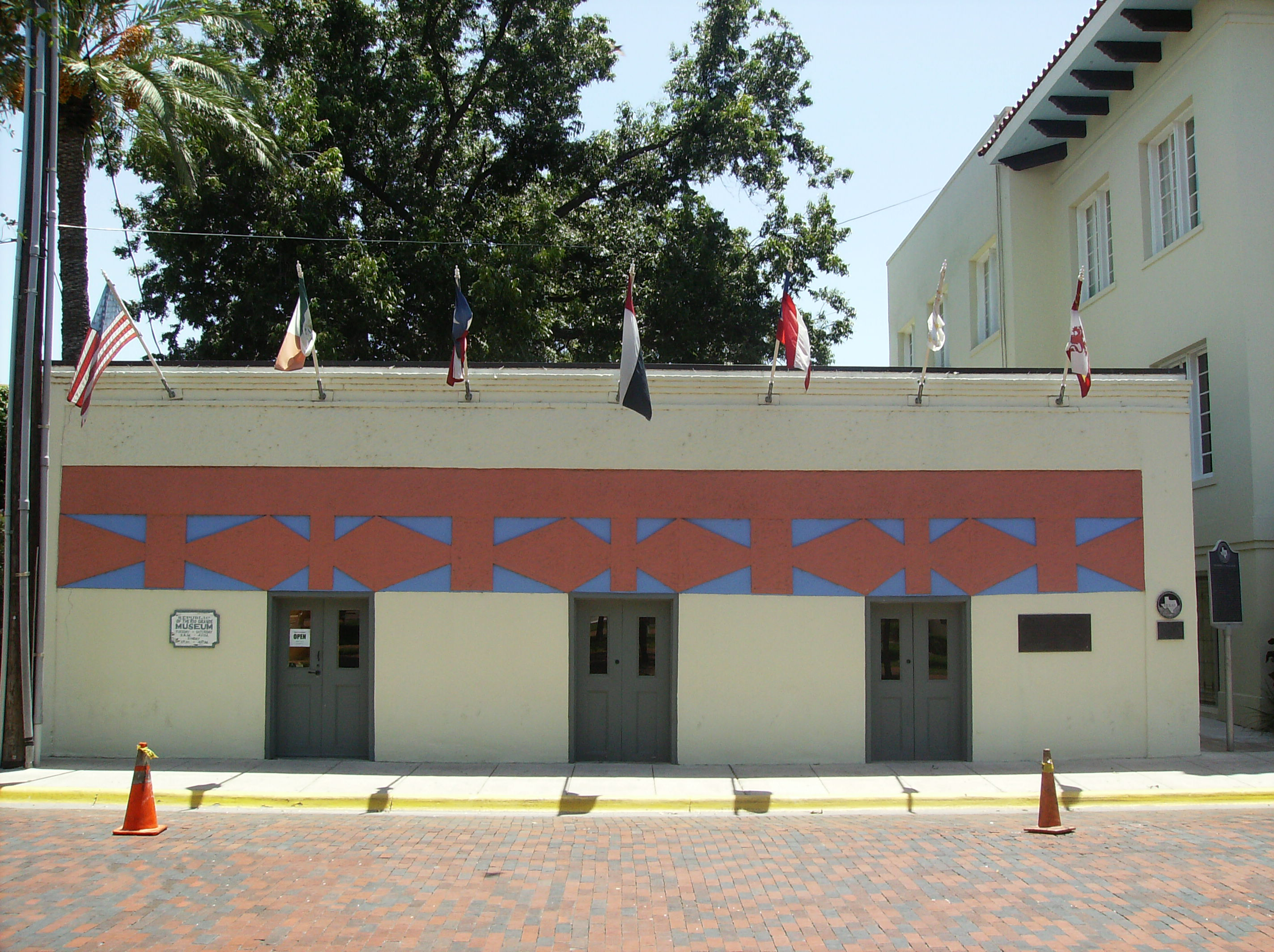
Today a part of the Republic of the Rio Grande's Capitol building is used as a museum.

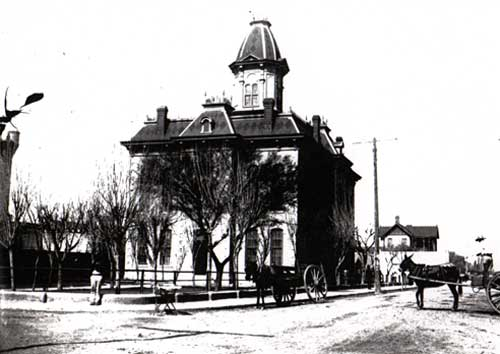
Webb County Courthouse in 1905

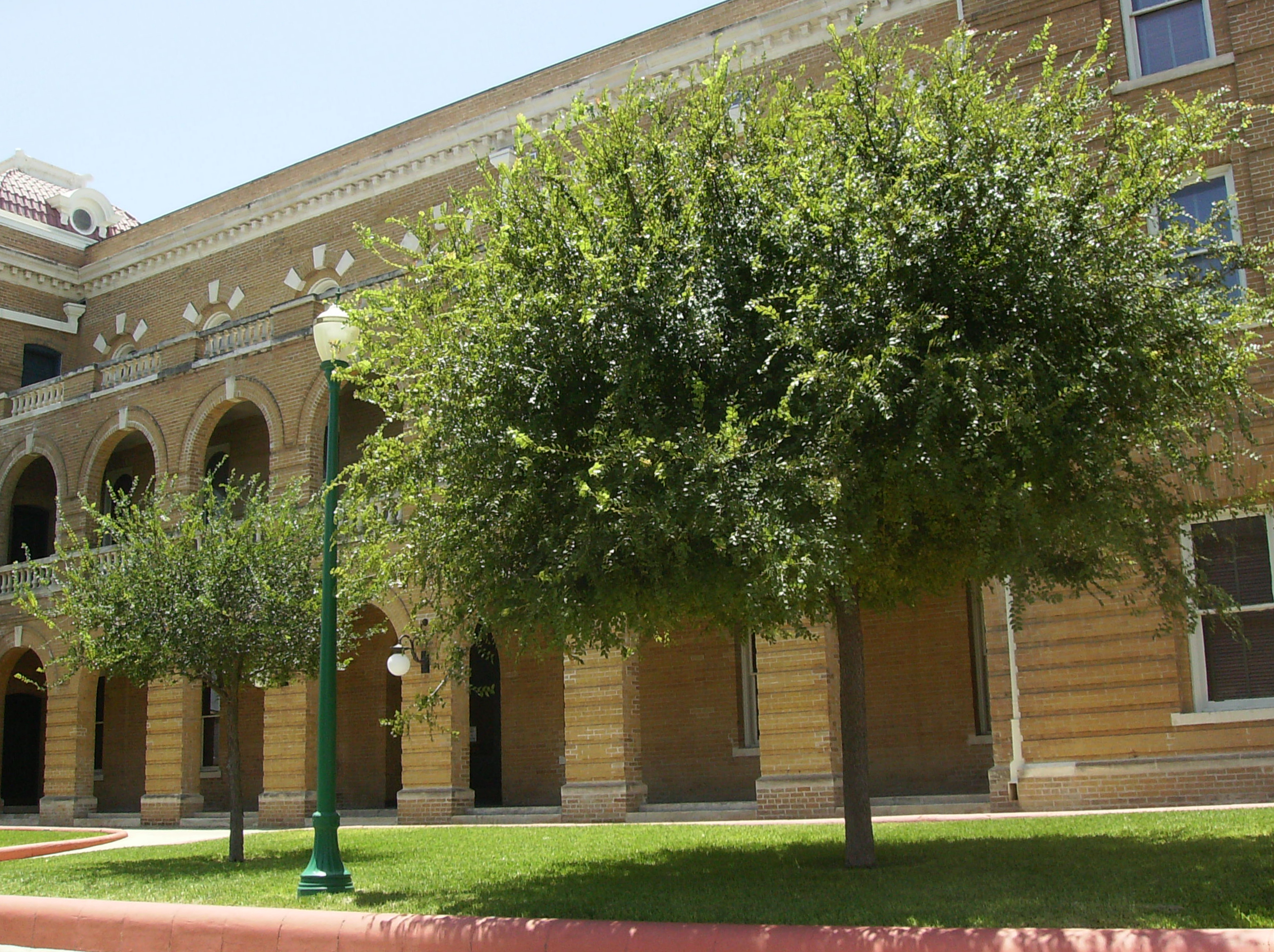
Webb County Courthouse in 2007

=== Hamilton Hotel ===
The Hamilton Hotel was built in 1900 as a three-story building. Beginning in 1923 an additional 9 floors were constructed, to plans by the prominent San Antonio architect Atlee B Ayres and his son Robert, making it the tallest building in Laredo, Texas. Today it serves as an apartment complex at 815 Salinas St, in downtown Laredo. It is 151 feet (46 m) tall and has 12 floors (above ground). In 1992 it was included in the National Register of Historic Places. After renovation and repair, it won the Housing and Urban Development Award for Excellence in Historic Preservation in 2002.

=== San Agustin Cathedral ===
The San Agustin Cathedral (formerly the San Agustin Church) was built in 1778 as a small parish by the Bishop of Guadalajara. In 1866, work began to turn the small parish into a large church. San Agustin Church is a Gothic structure with a five-story- 141 ft (43m) bell / clock tower. All the windows have the traditional Gothic shape with stained glass located between structural bays of its masonry walls. A French priest, Father Pierre Yves Kéralum, was the designer and architect for this historical monument. The new church was opened on December 12, 1872.

=== Rio Grande Plaza ===
The Rio Grande Plaza (formerly the Hilton Hotel) is an independently owned hotel located on the banks of the Rio Grande. It was built in 1975 and is 15 floors high. Its within a walking distance from the Gateway to the Americas International Bridge and has a view of the Rio Grande, Nuevo Laredo, Mexico, and downtown Laredo.

=== Ramada Plaza - Laredo ===
The Ramada Plaza - Laredo is a hotel affiliated to the Wyndham Hotel Group chain of hotels. Its building is the fourth tallest building in Laredo. Construction started in mid 1982 & opened its doors in late 1983 and it is 14 floors high. It first opened its door as a Holiday Inn. It is located along Interstate 35 south near the Laredo Civic Center. The Ramada Plaza - Laredo serves as a full-service hotel which includes shuttle service, bar, restaurant, fitness center, business center, and outside pool.

=== BBVA Compass Bank Building (Formerly Laredo National Bank Headquarters) ===
The Laredo National Bank Headquarters building was built in 1926 and it served as the Robert E. Lee Hotel briefly. Two additional floors were added and it became known as the Plaza Hotel until 1980. In 1981 it was purchased by the Laredo National Bank, renovated, and converted in 1982 to the bank's headquarters. In 2008 BBVA Compass Bank acquired LNB, and the handsome building is still in use as a bank today. At 10 stories, it is the fifth tallest in the city.

=== Senior Citizens Home ===
The Laredo's Senior Citizen Home is located in the San Agustin Historical District across from the Hamilton Hotel. The building is sixth tallest building in Laredo with 8 floors above ground. It serves the Laredo area as a retirement home for the senior citizens.

=== Laredo Medical Center ===
The Laredo Medical Center (Formally the Mercy Hospital) was built in 1999. It is the largest medical center in the Laredo area. Its building is located on United States Route 59 and is 7 floors high. It is of Spanish Colonial architecture. It has 325 licensed beds and 180 active physicians. The hospital has 1,568 employees.

=== Gateway Inn ===
The Gateway Inn is an independent hotel in the Laredo area. It is located along Business Spur Interstate 35 south. It is six stories high and it is located near Mall del Norte.

=== Rialto Hotel ===
The Rialto Hotel (formerly the Sames Moore Building) was built in 1925 and was used as a Local car dealership headquarters. In 2005 the building was bought and was renovated and turned into a hotel. It is the 9th tallest building in Laredo and is 6 stories high. It is located across the Hamilton Hotel in downtown San Agustin Historical District.

=== Walker Plaza ===
The Walker Plaza, named after rancher Gene S. Walker, Sr., was built in 1995 and houses the headquarters of the South Texas National Bank. It is 5 floors high and is the 10th tallest building in Laredo. The building is located along Interstate 35 south. On May 21, 1996 the building was a victim of a bomb blast which caused minor damage to the north side of the building. This explosion caused all the federal buildings in Texas, Oklahoma, Arkansas, Louisiana and New Mexico to be placed on "tighten security".

== Largest Building ==
Mall Del Norte is a super regional shopping mall in Laredo. The mall opened in 1977 and has since been renovated in 1991, 1993 (expansion), and 2007. It is located along Interstate 35 in the city's rapidly growing retail hub the city. Mall Del Norte is 1,198,199 sq ft (111,316.3 m^{2}).; with 148 stores, making it the second largest mall in South Texas and the largest building in Laredo.

== National Register of Historical Places ==
List of National Register of Historical Places in the Laredo area.

=== Hamilton Hotel ===
The Hamilton Hotel was first constructed in 1900 and was expanded from a three-story building to a 12-story building in various phases during 1924 to 1949. Robert M. Ayres was the buildings architect and Atlee B. Ayres was its engineer. The building is of Mission/Spanish Revival architectural style.

=== Republic of the Rio Grande Capitol Building ===
Republic of the Rio Grande Capitol Building is located in the downtown historical district next to the historical La Posada Hotel. It was once the Republic of the Rio Grande Capitol building now showcases memorabilia from the short lived Republic of the Rio Grande. It displays pictures, books, and furniture from the 19th century Laredo area. It offers guided tours for school age children and adults year-round. Because of this Republic, Laredo had flown seven flags instead of the traditional Six Flags over Texas.

=== Laredo Federal Building ===
Laredo Federal Building was finished in 1907. It is by the architect James Knox Taylor and is of Classical Revival style. In the early 20th century the building was used as a Courthouse, Customhouse, Government Office, and Post Office. Today it is used for federal offices and the 78040 Post Office.

=== Webb County Courthouse ===
The Webb County Courthouse was built in 1909 in downtown Laredo. Since its inauguration it has served as the Webb County courthouse. The cornerstone gives H. Sparbert as the contractor and the renowned Albert Giles of San Antonio as the architect.

=== Fort McIntosh ===
Fort McIntosh was an army base built in Laredo in 1850. Most of the fort's buildings are of Late Victorian architectural style. Today, Fort McIntosh was absorbed by the Laredo Community College. All the buildings were renovated and repaired and serve as classrooms and offices.

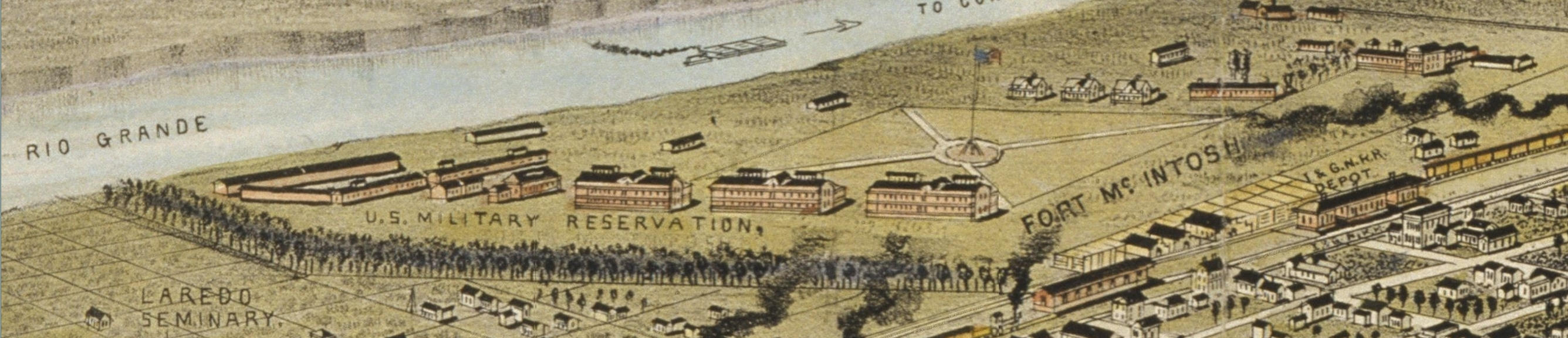
The full length of the Fort McIntosh U.S. Military Reservation in 1892.

== Proposed/Under Construction Buildings ==
Building Name	Status	Type	Use	Floors	Height	Area	Opening Year	Notes
Emerald Tower	cancelled	High rise Building	Condominiums	19	Unknown	424,000 ft^{2}	N/A	
Piazza del Sol	hold	Outdoor/Indoor Mall	Retail	1	N/A	1,200,000 ft^{2}	TBA	
Laredo Town Center	hold	Indoor Mall	Retail	1-2	N/A	580,577 ft^{2}	TBA	
Laredo Factory Stores	hold	Outlet Mall	Retail	1	N/A	452,000 ft^{2}	TBA	
