= Columbia, Wisconsin =

- Unincorporated community
- Location within Wisconsin Location within the United States
- Coordinates: 44°30′59″N 90°43′12″W
- Country: United States
- State: Wisconsin
- County: Clark
- Town: Hewett
- Elevation: 948 ft (289 m)
- Time zone: UTC-6 (Central (CST))
  - Summer (DST): UTC-5 (CDT)
- Area codes: 715 & 534
- GNIS feature ID: 1563277

Columbia is an unincorporated community located in the town of Hewett, Clark County, Wisconsin, United States.

== History ==
A post office called Columbia was established in 1894, and remained in operation until it was discontinued in 1920. The community was named after the song "Hail, Columbia."

In 1918 the History of Clark County said Columbia had a train station on the Omaha line, and that local sites included a school, a church, and a cheese factory.
