= The Silver Dome Ballroom =

- Silver Dome Ballroom, The
- U.S. National Register of Historic Places
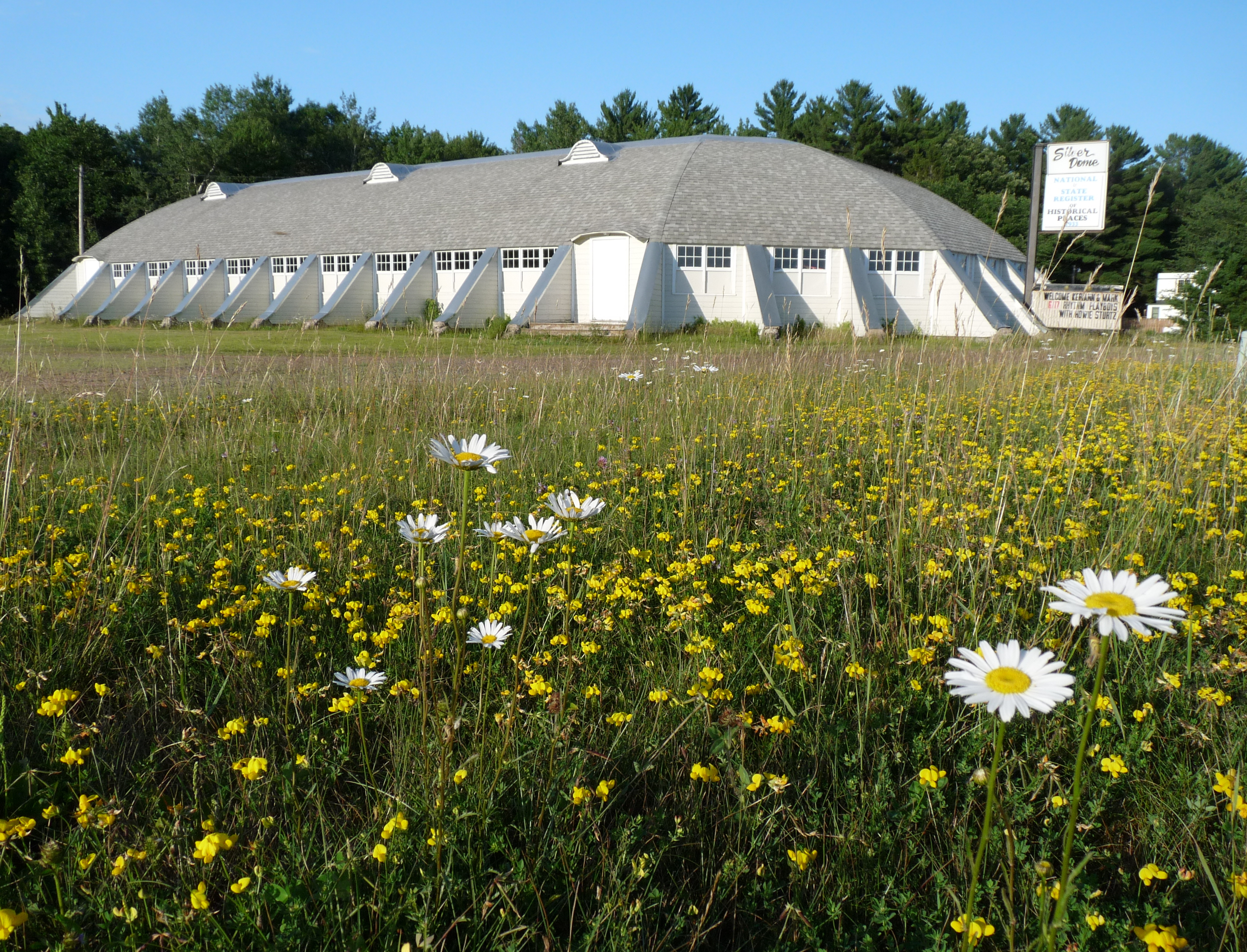

- Location within Wisconsin Location within the United States
- Location: US 10, 1 mi. W of jct. of US 10 and Collier Rd., Hewett, Wisconsin
- Coordinates: 44°33′54″N 90°41′57″W
- Area: 3.1 acres (1.3 ha)
- Architect: Moen, Cornel
- Architectural style: Modern Movement
- NRHP reference No.: 97000647
- Added to NRHP: June 27, 1997

The Silver Dome Ballroom is a 1930s-era dance hall located in Hewett, Wisconsin, west of Neillsville. It was added to the National Register of Historic Places in 1997.

== History ==
The ballroom was originally owned by brothers Al, Paul, Walter and Herb Keller. It was designed in the Modern Movement architecture style and built from 1929 to 1933. The German patent for the unique arch style roof was purchased for a $1,000 royalty fee.

The grand opening was July 12, 1933, featuring Johnny Davis and his NBC Orchestra. Other early national bands included Duke Ellington, the Six Fat Dutchmen, Fezz Fritchie, Ty-Leroy and the Scotch Highlanders, the Dux Brothers' Orchestra, and Whoopee John Wilfahrt. Wisconsin Old Tyme bands included Lawrence Duchow, Romy Gosz, the Blue Denim Boys, Bernie Roberts, and Jerry Gilbertson. Local bands included Wally Ives, Art and Louis Nemitz, Pat Lautenbach and the Varsity Band, the Merrymen, Jack Kolbeck of Marshfield, the Vic Carpenter Band of Abbotsford, the Rhode Bros. of Greenwood, the Pine Valley Dutchmen, the Howie Sturtz Orchestra, and the Keller's own 8-piece Band.

The ballroom continued to host national acts into more recent times, including country acts George Jones, Johnny Cash, Pee Wee King, John Anderson, the Bellamy Brothers, Sonny James, Jerry Reed, Don Williams, and Bob Wills and his Texas Playboys. It has also hosted rock acts including the Buckinghams, the Buffalo Springfield, Cheap Trick, the Cryan' Shames, Foghat, the Grass Roots, Herman's Hermits, Tommy James, Styx, and Bobby Vee.
