= Charles Foote House =

Historic house in Wisconsin, United States

- U.S. National Register of Historic Places
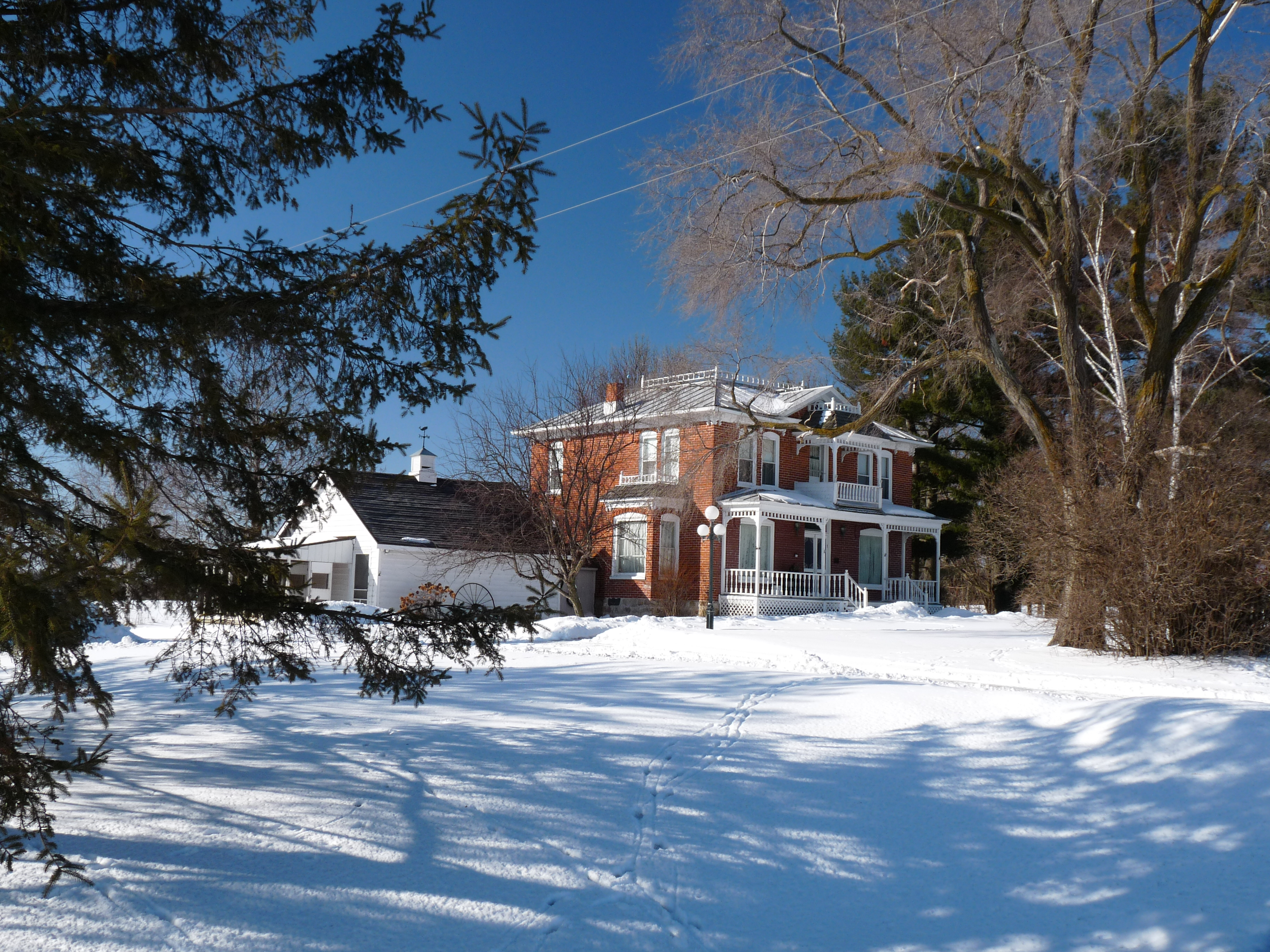
- Charles Foote House
- Location: W 5055 US 10, Pine Valley, Wisconsin
- Coordinates: 44°33′09″N 90°33′58″W
- Area: 3 acres (1.2 ha)
- Architectural style: Italianate
- NRHP reference No.: 97001443
- Added to NRHP: November 13, 1997

The Charles Foote House is located in Pine Valley, Wisconsin.

== History ==
Charles Foote was a Civil War veteran, town treasurer, and member of the Clark County Agricultural Society. The house was added to both the State and the National Register of Historic Places in 1997.
