= Omaha Hotel =

Former hotel in Neillsville, Wisconsin

- U.S. National Register of Historic Places
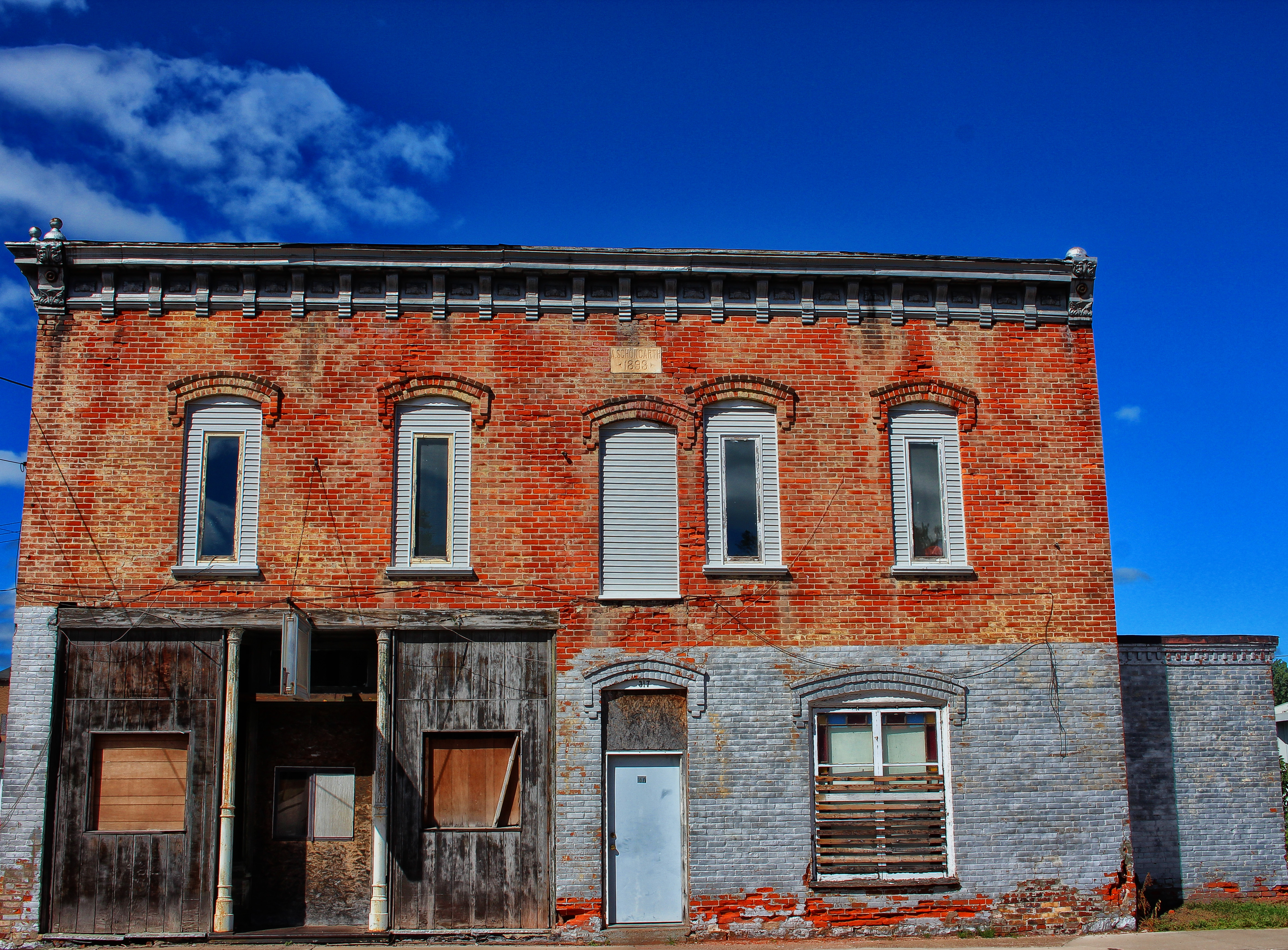
- Building in 2013

- Location within Wisconsin
- Location: 7th Street and Clay Street, Neillsville, Wisconsin
- Coordinates: 44.5615°N 90.5997°W
- Built: 1892–1893
- Architectural style: Late Victorian
- NRHP reference No.: 13000101
- Added to NRHP: March 20, 2013

The Omaha Hotel is a former railroad hotel in Neillsville, Wisconsin, United States, that is listed on the National Register of Historic Places. It was built in 1893, near a railroad depot to serve middle-income and business travelers. It continued to operate as a hotel until the 1940s, during which time it was renamed the Hotel Paulus and later the Hamilton Hotel.

== History ==
Entrepreneurs Peter and Ed Weber saw an opportunity to cater to railroad travelers in Neilsville in the late 19th century. The Webers purchased a lot to the immediate south of the Chicago, St. Paul, Minneapolis and Omaha Railway, less than a block away from the Neilsville depot. The hotel was built by August Schoengarth; construction began with the foundation in November 1892 and finished in 1893. The Webers chose the name Omaha Hotel, which created the perception that it was affiliated with the railroad. The rear of the hotel was visible from the depot platform and used as a billboard to travelers, advertising its rate. The hotel operated on the European Plan, excluding meals from the room price. The hotel was not intended for luxury, instead catering to middle-income and business travelers.

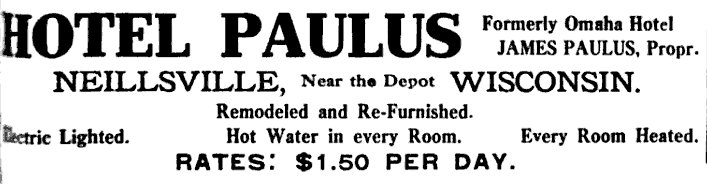
1909 advertisement for the Hotel Paulus

In 1908, James Paulus purchased the hotel and renamed it the Hotel Paulus. "Hotel Paulus" was added to the west face of the hotel, the sign remains today. Beginning in the 1920s, the hotel was operated by Clarence Hamilton and known as the Hamilton Hotel. The hotel was vacant by the early 1940s. Furniture dealer and undertaker Herbert Lowe bought the building in July 1945; he converted the second floor into apartments and used the first floor to store furniture.

The 2003–2004 Neillsville Architectural Survey identified the hotel as possibly eligible for inclusion on the National Register of Historic Places. The building was listed on the Register on March 20, 2013. As of 2013, the Omaha Hotel is one of two historic hotels that survive in Neillsville. The owners of the building intend to rehabilitate the structure and turn it into residential and retail space.

== Design ==
The building is located at the western edge of the town's commercial district, at the northeast corner of the intersection of 7th Street and Clay Street. It is a two-story, late Victorian rectangular building measuring 45 by 42 feet (14 by 13 m) with a 10 by 14 feet (3.0 by 4.3 m) one-story wing along the east wall. The exterior consists of red clay bricks manufactured locally and laid in running bond. The foundation is stone with a full basement. The south and west walls face the street and are topped with a bracketed metal cornice. The north and east faces of the building are utilitarian in appearance. The property includes one "non-contributing" garage built circa 1970. A non-original one-story aluminum addition extends from the north wall of the wing flush to the north face of the building.

== See also ==
- National Register of Historic Places listings in Clark County, Wisconsin

== Bibliography ==
- Lacey, Patricia (2013). NRHP Nomination: Omaha Hotel (PDF). National Register of Historic Places (Report). National Park Service. Archived from the original (PDF) on April 21, 2013.
