= Mall del Norte =

- Interior of Mall del Norte
- Location: Laredo, Texas, United States
- Coordinates: 27.5507°N 99.5000°W
- Developer: Levcor Inc.
- Management: CBL & Associates Properties, Inc.
- Owner: CBL & Associates Properties, Inc.
- Stores and services: 103
- Anchor tenants: 9
- Floor area: 1,212,515 sq ft (112,646 m^{2}).
- Floors: 1 (2 in Dillard's, JCPenney, and Macy's)
- Website: malldelnorte.com

Mall del Norte is a super regional shopping mall in Laredo, Texas. The mall opened in 1977 and has since been renovated in 1991, 1993 (expansion), 2007, and 2012. It is located along Interstate 35 in the city's rapidly growing retail hub of town. Mall del Norte is 1,212,515 sq ft (112,646 m^{2}) with over 160 stores, making it the 2nd largest mall in South Texas, and one of the largest malls in Texas overall. La Plaza Mall in McAllen, Texas is larger by 3,000 sq. feet.

In 2007, as part of the renovations of the mall, Cinemark Theater 16 and Circuit City constructed where the former Montgomery Ward store was located. The mall is currently owned by CBL & Associates Properties.

On July 1, 2020, it was announced that Sears would be closing as part of a plan to close 28 stores nationwide. The store closed in September 2020.

On April 7, 2024, Mega Furniture opened a furniture store in the former Sears utilizing the Sears anchor space.

== Gallery ==
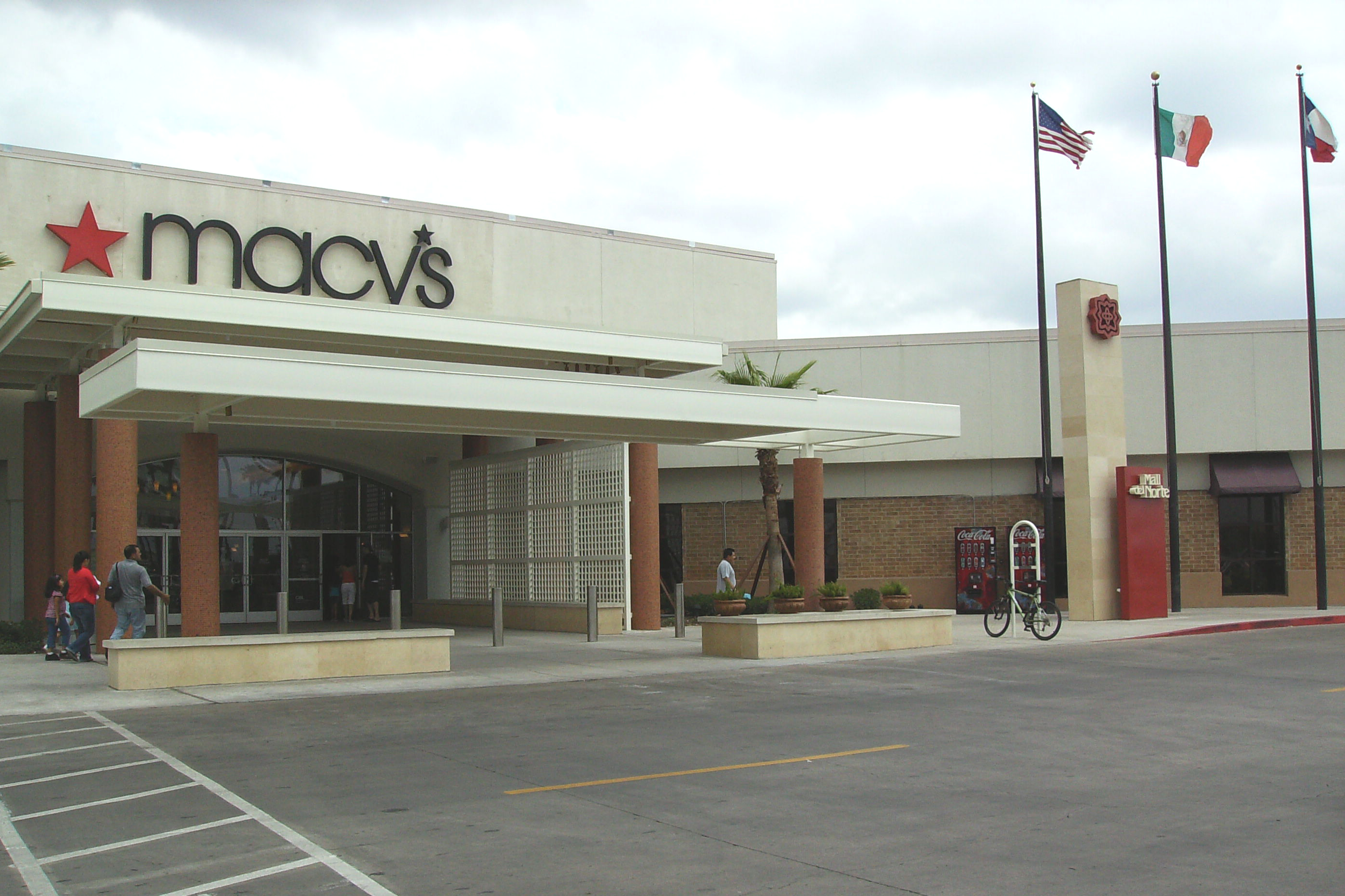
Mall del Norte's Macy's entrance

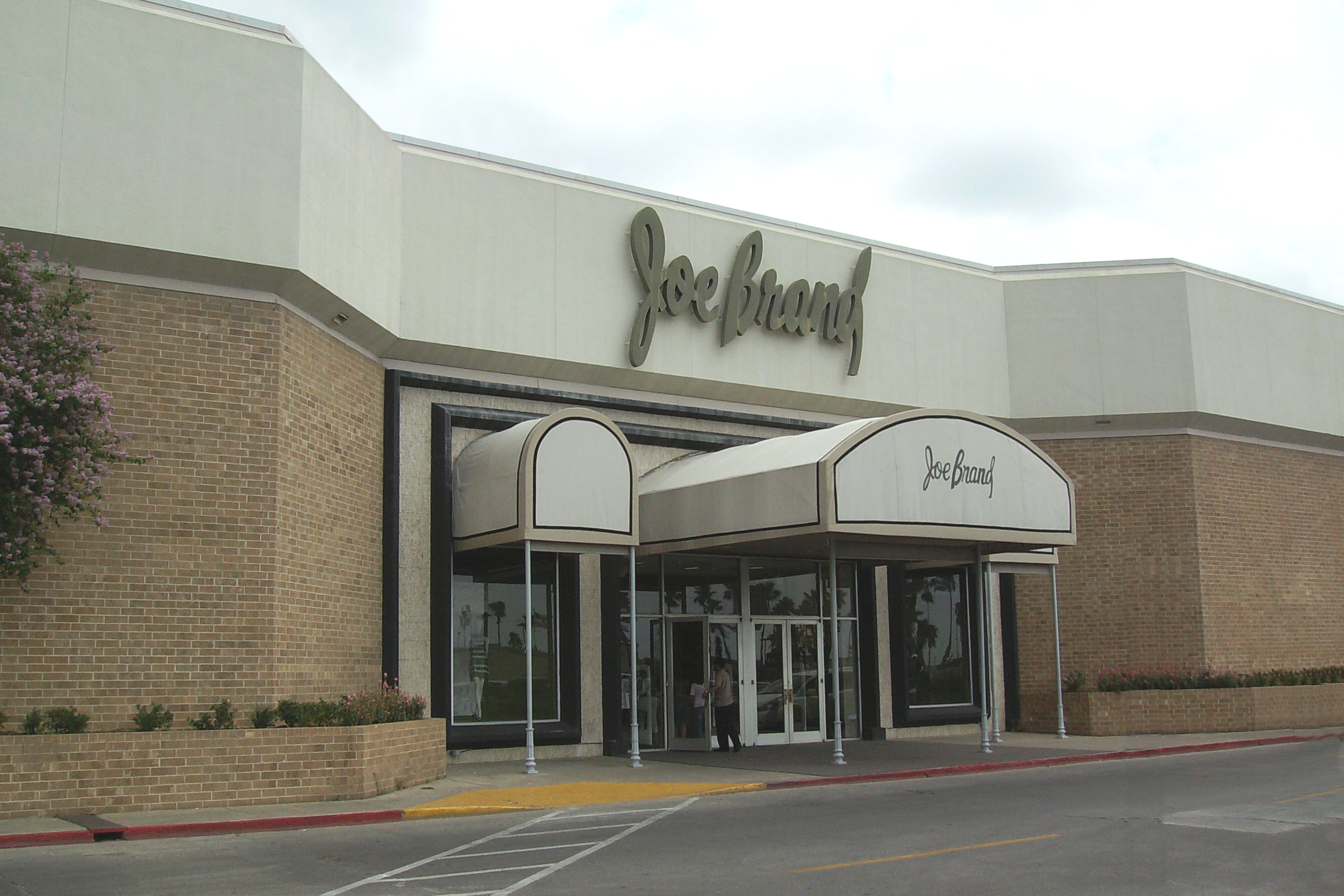
Mall del Norte's Joe Brand's entrance

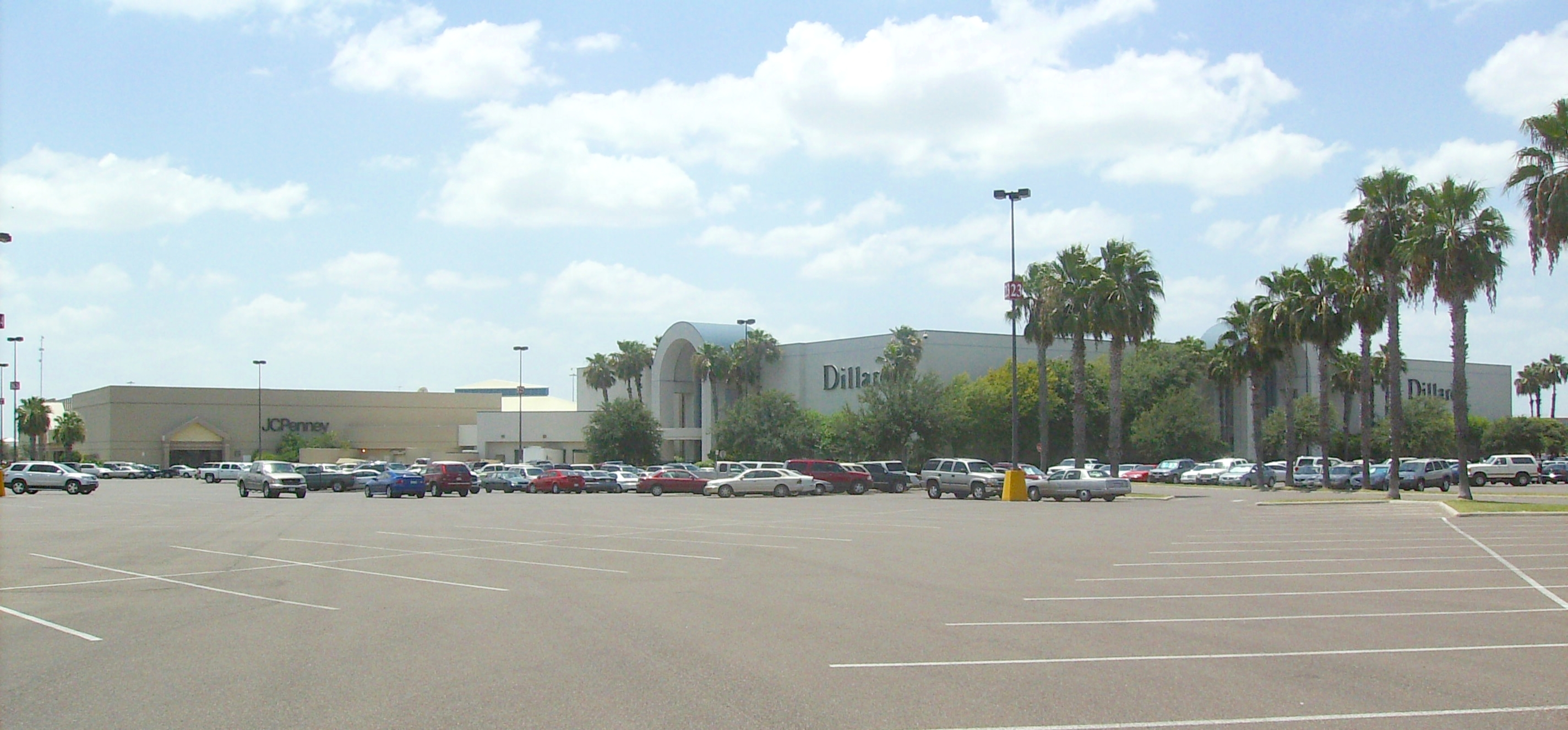
Northwest wing

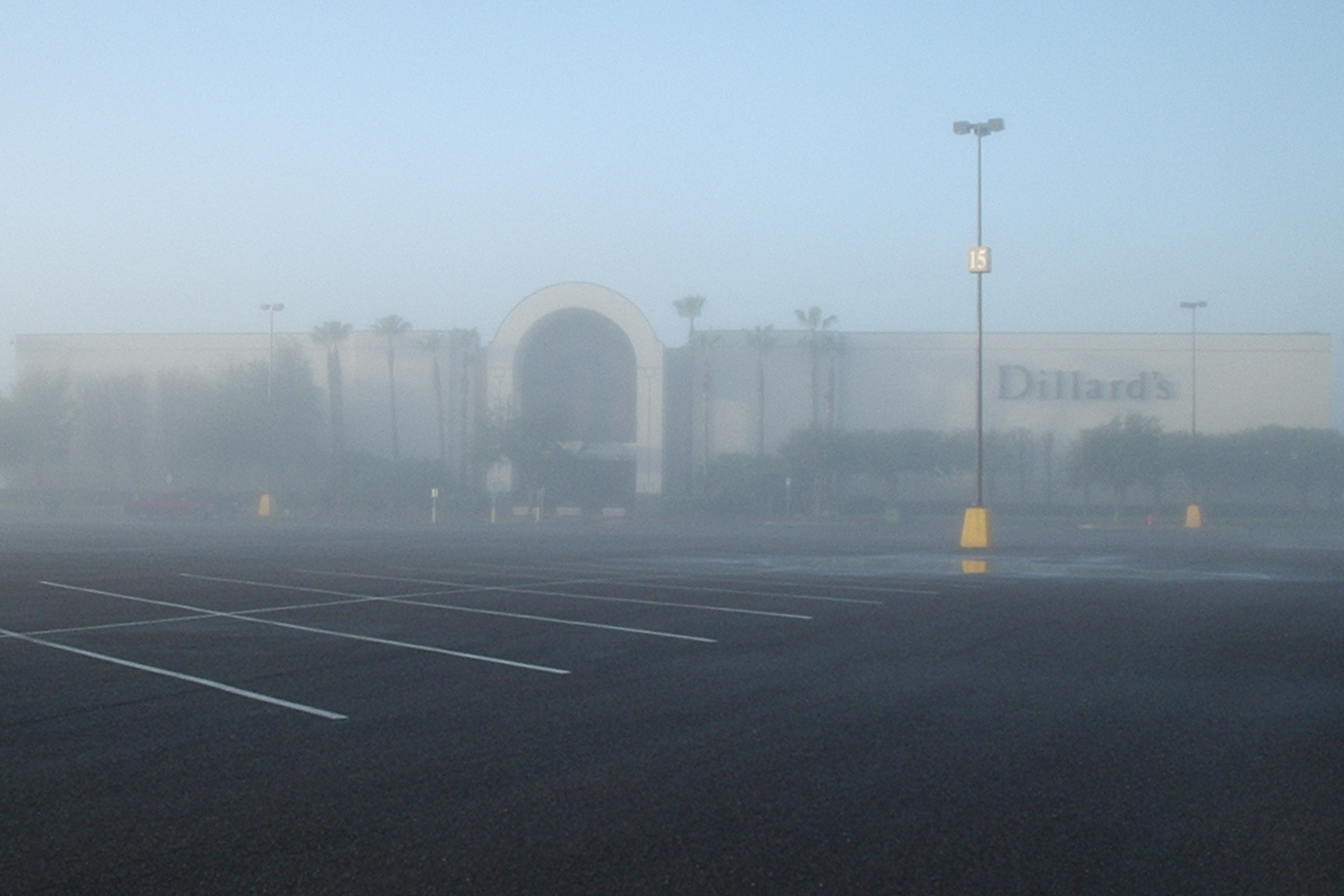
Foggy morning at Dillard's in Mall del Norte
