= Forrest D. and Marian Calway House =

Historic house in Wisconsin, United States

- U.S. National Register of Historic Places
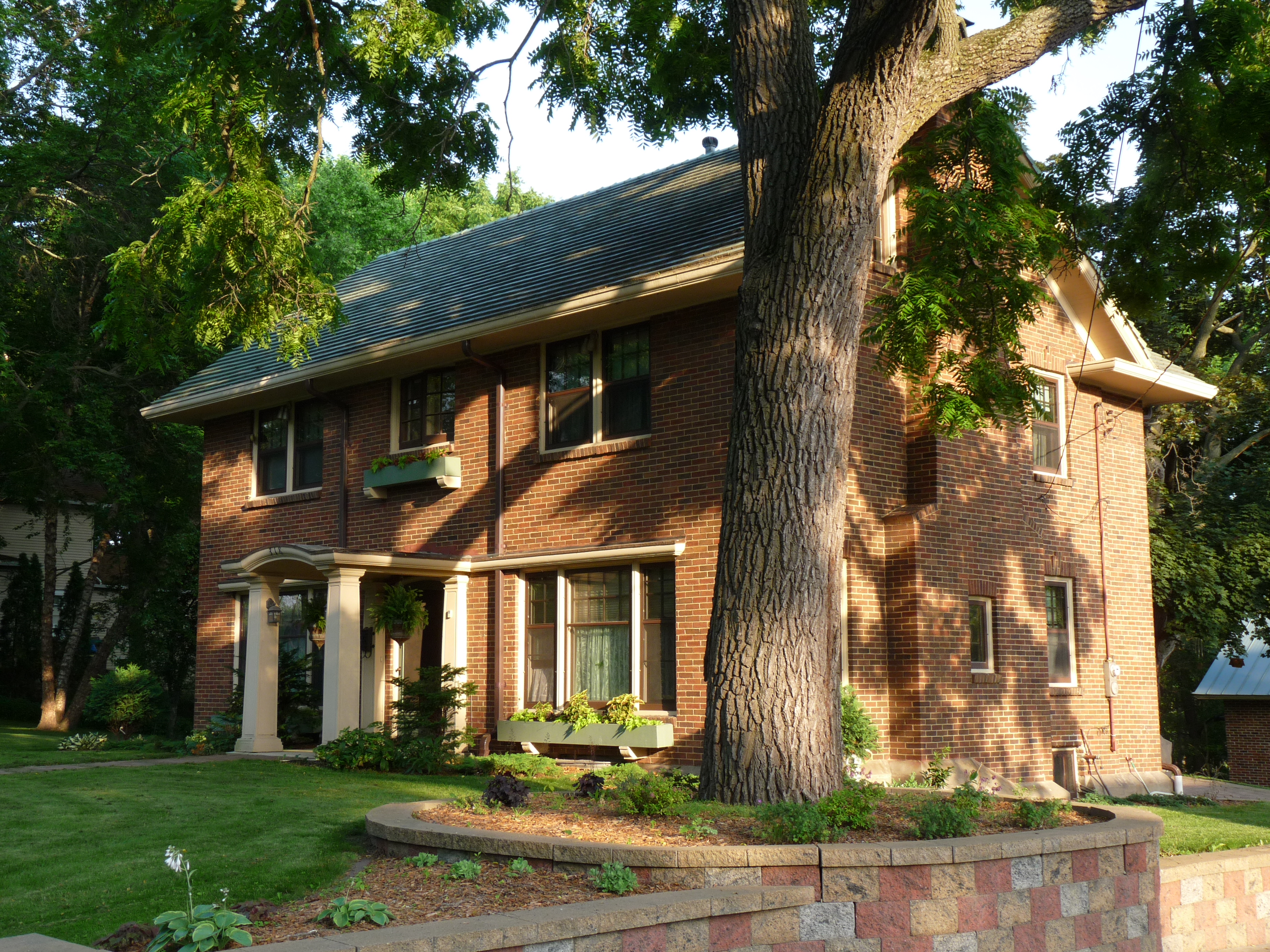

- Location within Wisconsin Location within the United States
- Location: 318 E. Fourth St. Neillsville, Wisconsin
- Coordinates: 44°33′31″N 90°35′30″W
- Built: 1917
- Architectural style: Colonial Revival
- NRHP reference No.: 05001297
- Added to NRHP: November 15, 2005

The Forrest D. and Marian Calway House is a historic house located at 318 East Fourth Street in Neillsville, Wisconsin. It was added to the National Register of Historic Places on November 15, 2005.

== History ==
The house was designed for newlyweds Forrest and Marian Calway. Marian was the daughter of Wisconsin State Assemblyman and circuit court judge, James O'Neill (1847-1922). Judge O'Neill was the nephew of the founder of Neillsville, James O'Neill (1810-1882).
