= Neillsville Masonic Temple Lodge No. 163 =

- U.S. National Register of Historic Places
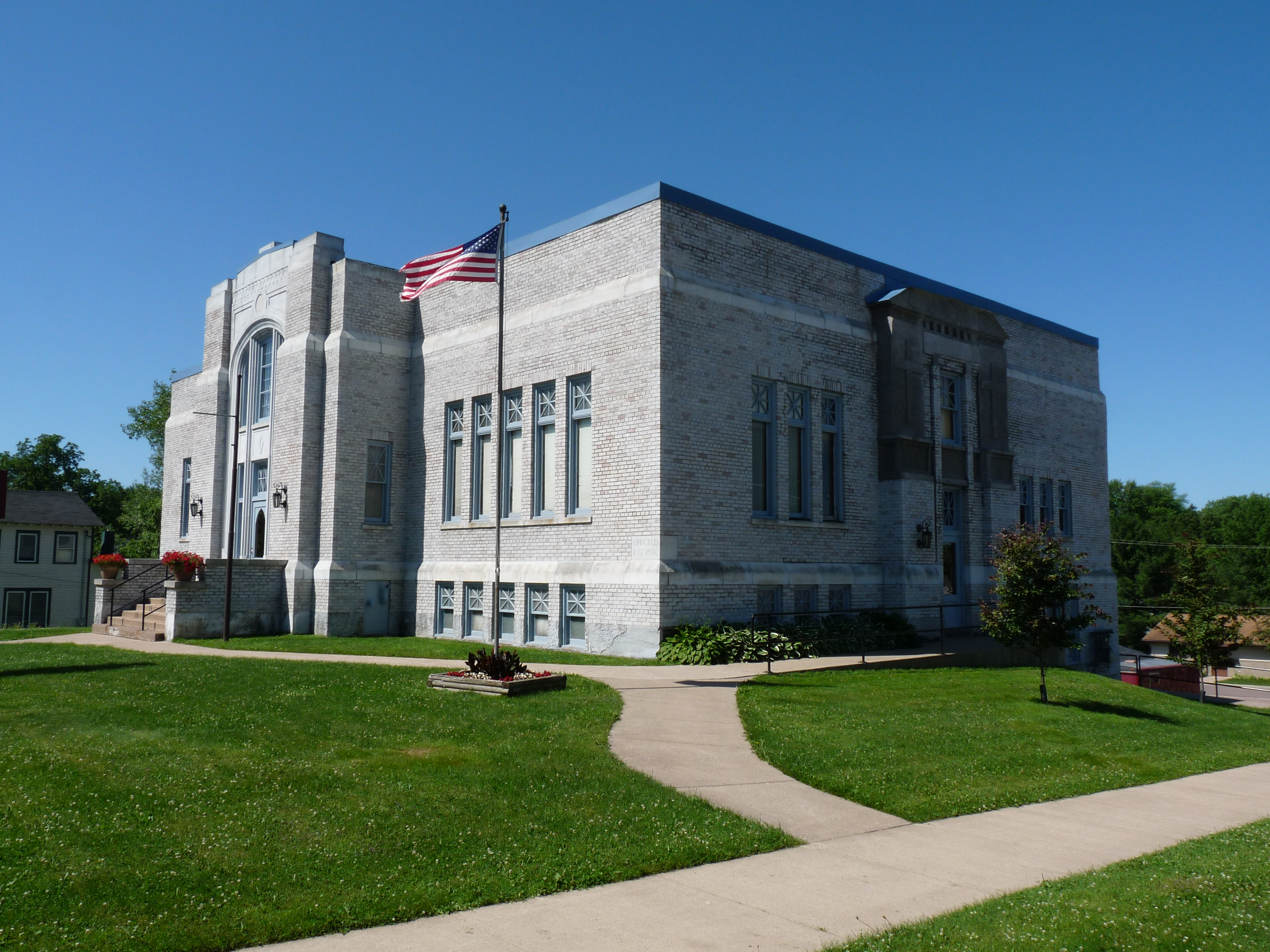

- Location within Wisconsin Location within the United States
- Location: 316 Hewett St., Neillsville, Wisconsin
- Coordinates: 44°33′40″N 90°35′49″W
- Area: less than one acre
- Built: 1928
- Architectural style: Masonic lodge
- NRHP reference No.: 04001134
- Added to NRHP: October 6, 2004

The Neillsville Masonic Temple Lodge in Neillsville, Wisconsin is a building from 1928. It was listed on the National Register of Historic Places in 2004.
