= William B. and Jennie Tufts House =

Historic house in Wisconsin, United States

- U.S. National Register of Historic Places
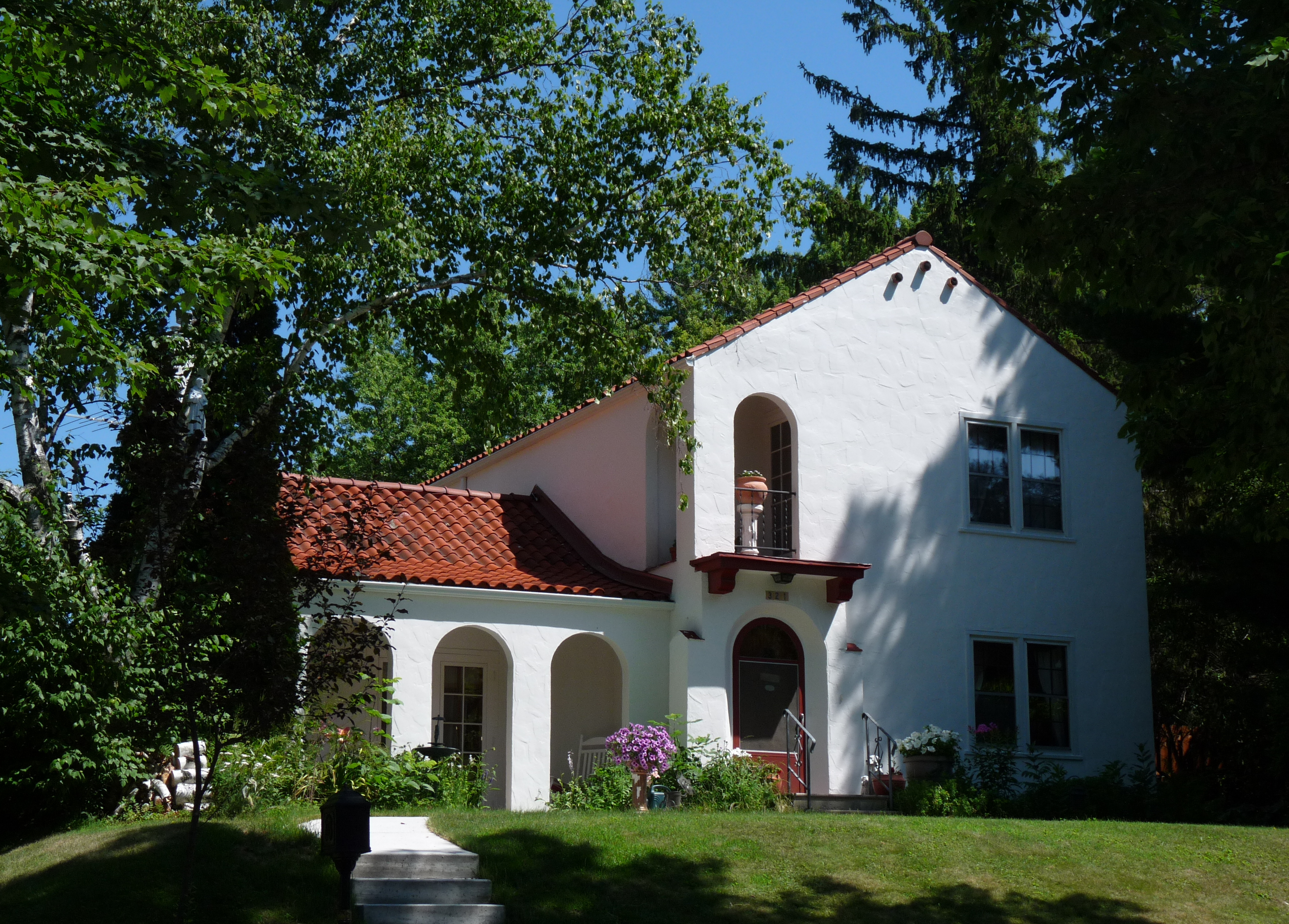
- Location: 321 E. 4th St.
- Nearest city: Neillsville, Wisconsin
- Coordinates: 44.55913°N 90.59166°W
- NRHP reference No.: 11001045
- Added to NRHP: January 20, 2012

The William B. and Jennie Tufts House is located in Neillsville, Wisconsin. It was added to the National Register of Historic Places in 2012. The house was once home to William B. Tufts, a Colonel in the United States Army, and his wife, Jennie.
