= Laredo National Bank =

Coordinates: 27.5051°N 99.5049°W

- Company type: foundation = 1892
- Industry: Finance and Insurance
- Headquarters: Laredo, Texas
- Products: Banking Investments Insurance
- Revenue: $3.5 billion USD (FY 2006) prior to merger
- Website: www.lnb.com

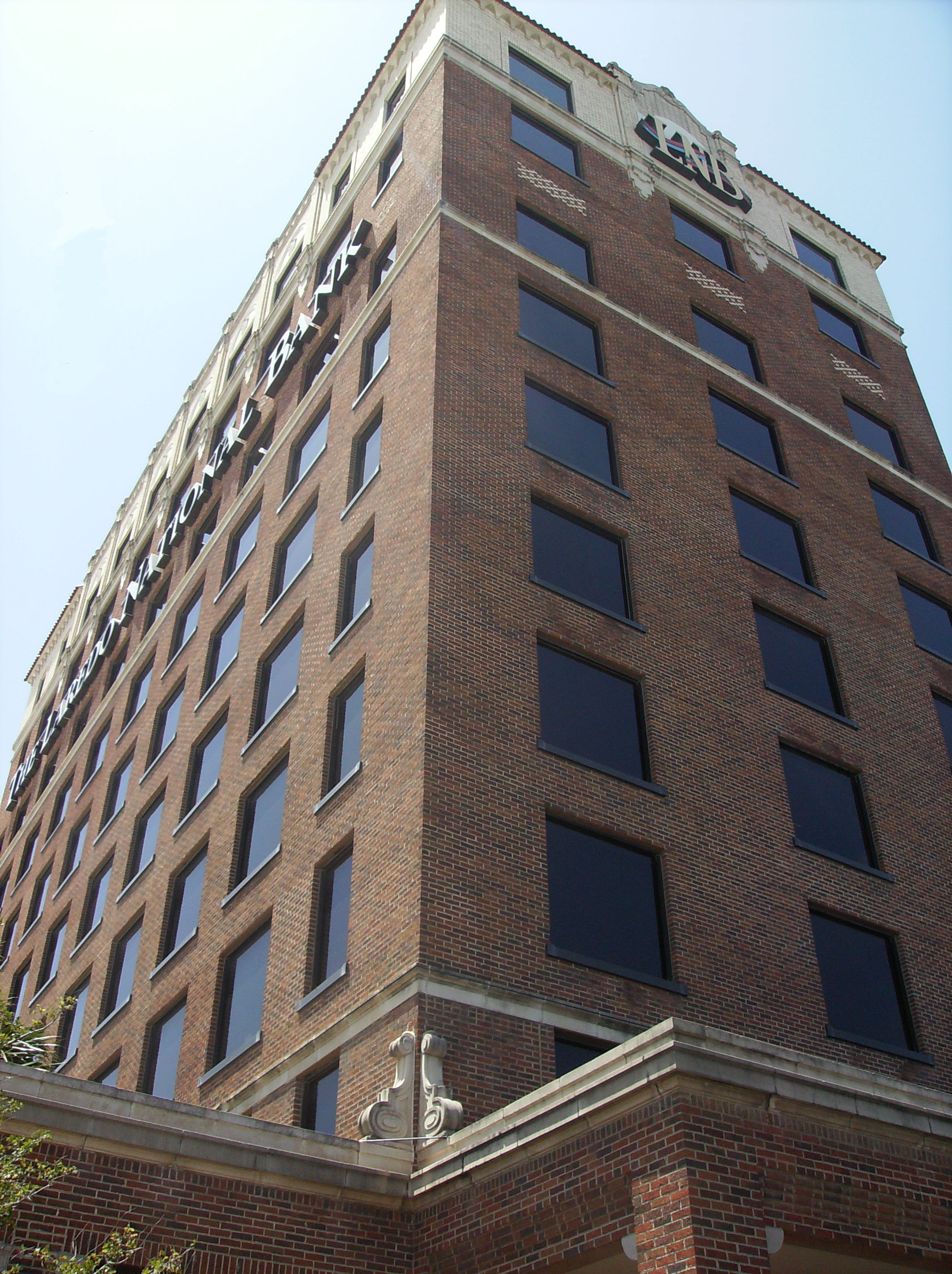
The Laredo National Bank's building is the fourth tallest building in Laredo, Texas

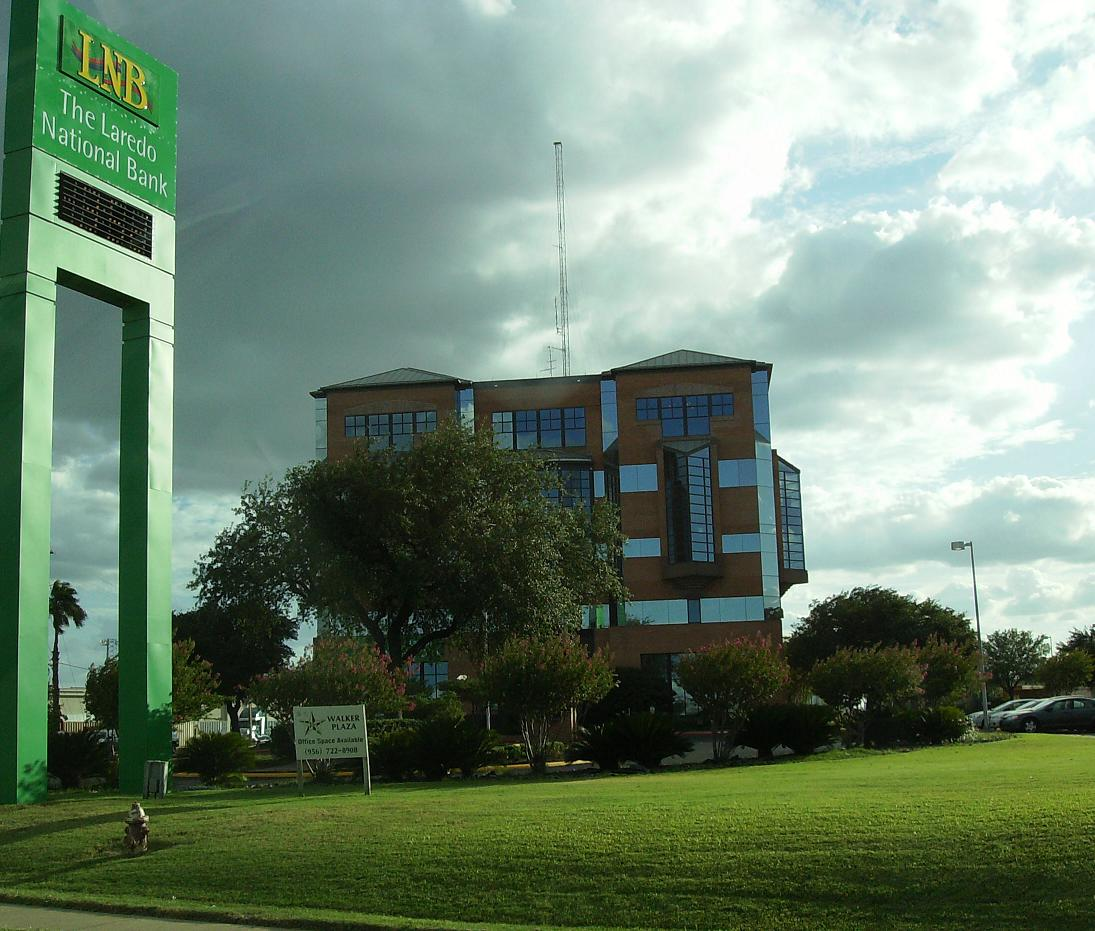
The Walker Plaza housed the South Texas National Bank a subsidiary of LNB, today all South Texas National Banks were renamed Laredo National Bank.

The Laredo National Bank (LNB) was a Texas bank founded in 1892 headquartered in Laredo, Texas which was bought by Banco Bilbao Vizcaya Argentaria. LNB had been a component in the development of business and industry along the United States-Mexico border and South Texas. The Laredo National Bank had grown to approximately $3.5 billion in assets and was the fifth largest independent bank in Texas. Headquartered in Laredo, Texas, LNB had branches in Austin, Brownsville, Corpus Christi, Dallas, Del Rio, Eagle Pass, Harlingen, Houston, McAllen, San Antonio, San Marcos, and Weslaco. Laredo National Bank owned South Texas National Bank. Laredo National Bank's branches and headquarters names have been changed to Compass Bank on November 14, 2008 due to a merger between Laredo National Bank Compass and BBVA. BBVA Compass plans on cutting 170 jobs and eliminating the Laredo National Bank headquarters.

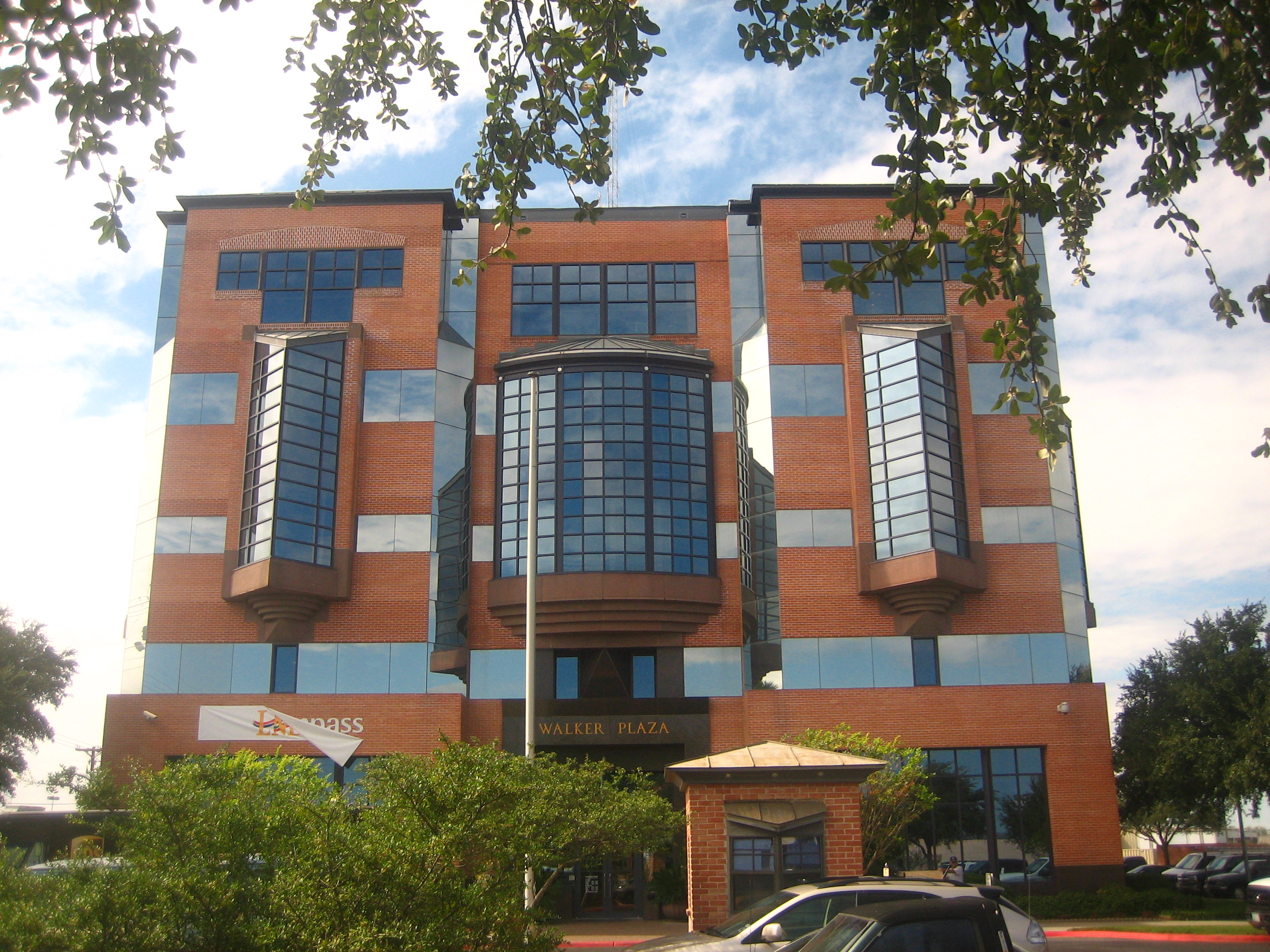
Transition of changing the name of banks and branches has begun notice underneath the LNB sign, Compass is underneath

== BBVA ==
Laredo National Bank was a wholly owned subsidiary of Banco Bilbao Vizcaya Argentaria (BBVA), a multinational Spanish banking group. BBVA has a major presence in the main Texas market and principal cities with Laredo National Bank, Texas State Bank, and State National all of which were merged and had their names changed to BBVA Compass Bank.

== Locations ==
Austin, Texas 1
Brownsville, Texas 2
Dallas, Texas 2
Corpus Christi, Texas 4/2
Del Rio, Texas 3
Eagle Pass, Texas 4
Harlingen, Texas 1
Houston, Texas 7
Laredo, Texas 12/9
McAllen, Texas 3
San Antonio, Texas 7/1
San Marcos, Texas 1/1
Weslaco, Texas 1

Total: 44 Branches / 13 Off-site ATMs
