= Dickinson Estate Historic District =

Historic district in Vermont, United States

- U.S. National Register of Historic Places
- U.S. Historic district
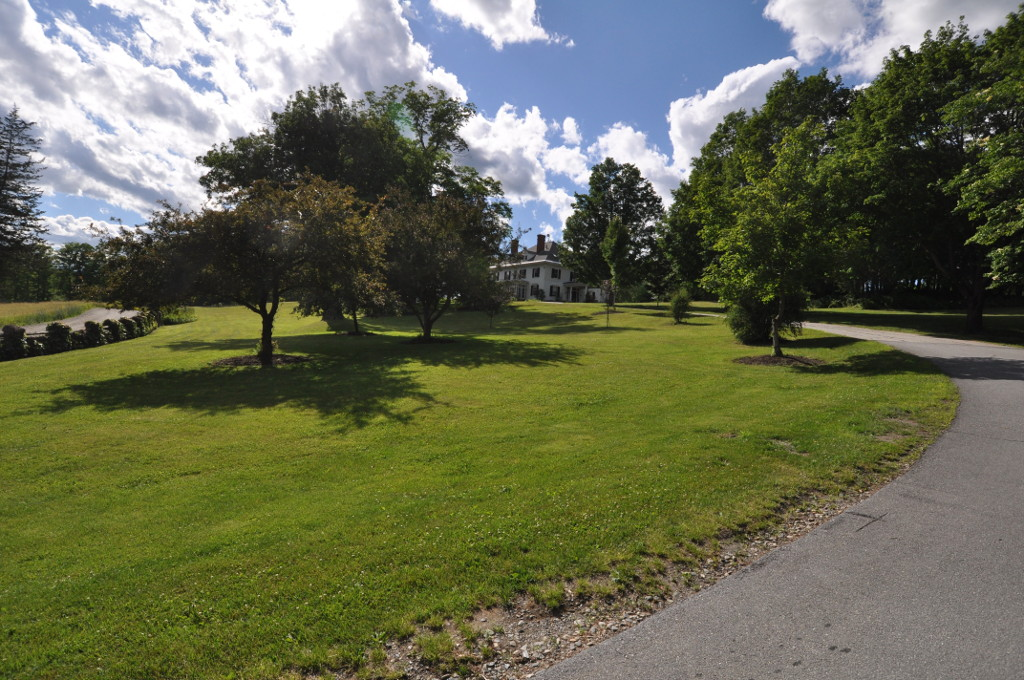

- Location within Vermont Location within the United States
- Location: Dickinson and Kipling Rds., Brattleboro, Vermont
- Coordinates: 42°53′28″N 72°34′0″W
- Area: 32 acres (13 ha)
- Built: 1900
- Architect: Fornachon, Maurice
- Architectural style: Colonial Revival, Greek Revival
- NRHP reference No.: 05001237
- Added to NRHP: November 9, 2005

The Dickinson Estate Historic District encompasses the core holding of an early 20th century country estate in rural northern Brattleboro, Vermont. It includes a sophisticated Colonial Revival mansion house, built in 1900, and a variety of agricultural outbuildings dating to the same period. The estate, and in particular its barnyard complex, are well-preserved remnants of this era. The property is also notable for its association with Rudyard Kipling, who owned the estate for several years. It was listed on the National Register of Historic Places in 2005. The district covers 30 acres (12 ha) of what is now the main campus of the World Learning organization, a larger subset of the original Dickinson Estate.

== Description and history ==
The former Dickinson Estate is located in rural northern Brattleboro, near its border with Dummerston, on the west side of Kipling Road. The World Learning campus occupies more than 160 acres (65 ha) of a large farm property that was known in the 19th century as the Bliss Farm. In 1899 the Bliss Farm was purchased by Frederick and Harriet Dickinson; he was a prominent local businessman, she the daughter of a New York City millionaire. The farm became the core of a gentleman's farm country estate that reached 500 acres (200 ha) at its greatest extent. The Dickinsons built a 20-room Colonial Revival mansion house (to a design by Belgian architect Maurice Fornachon), and constructed a number of agricultural outbuildings to support farm operations on the property, demolishing most of the older buildings on the farm in the process. The only older building to survive on the property is an 1860s Greek Revival cottage, in which the Kiplings gave birth to their daughter while construction of nearby Naulakha was underway.

The central portion of the Dickinson estate was purchased in 1937 by Thomas Bibby, who continued to operate the farm. His widow remarried, to Henry Persons, a principal in the Experiment in International Living, now World Learning. That organization bought a subset of the estate (excluding the main complex of farm buildings) in 1962, and gradually expanded its holdings to more than 160 acres (65 ha).

The property is historically significant as having one of the few surviving country estate houses left in Brattleboro, and for its remarkably well-preserved early-20th century farmyard, which was also designed by the architect Fornachon. The elaborate and deliberate arrangement of the buildings in the farm complex is particularly unique in the state.

== See also ==
- National Register of Historic Places listings in Windham County, Vermont
