= Hewett, Wisconsin =

- Town
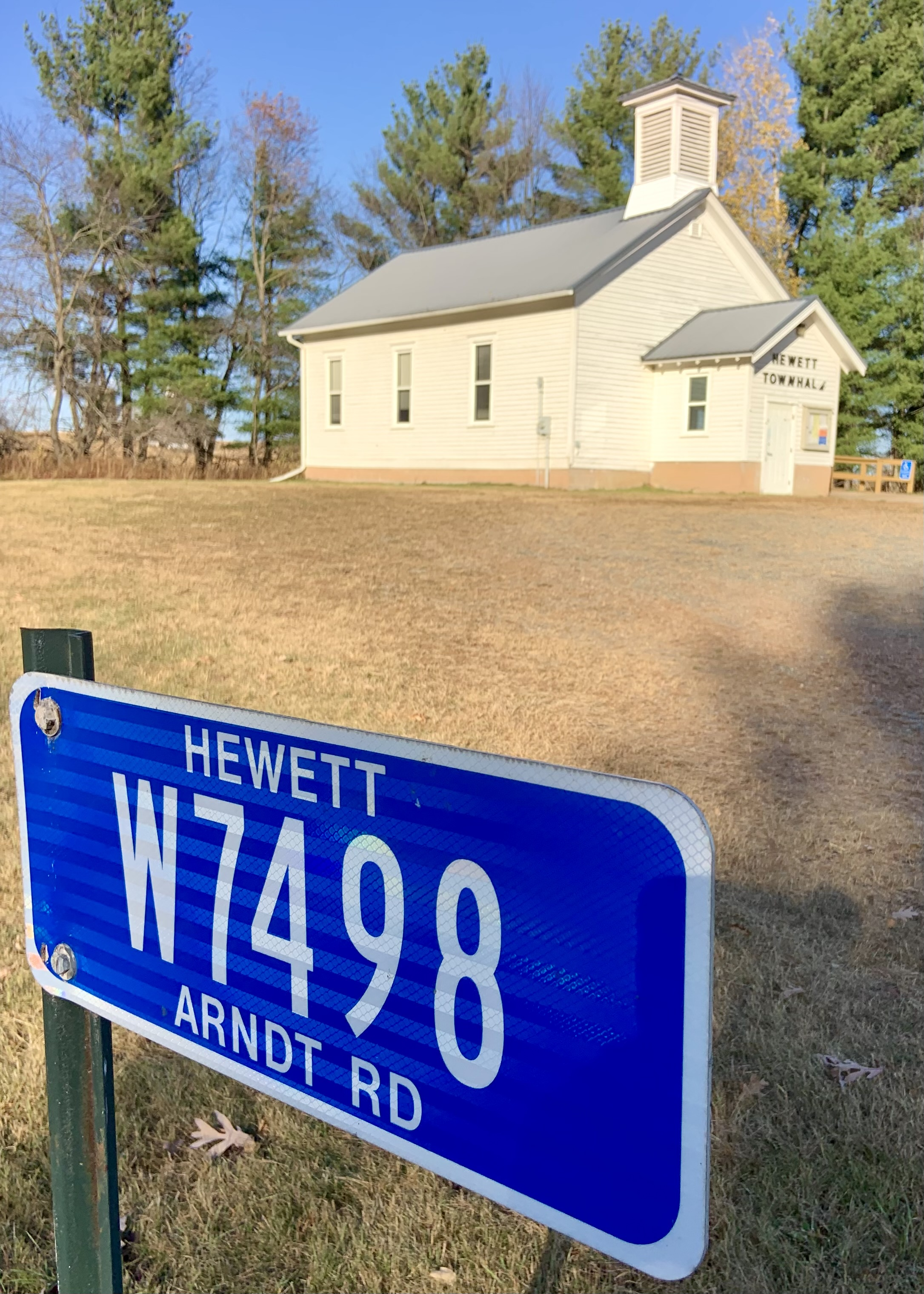
- Town hall

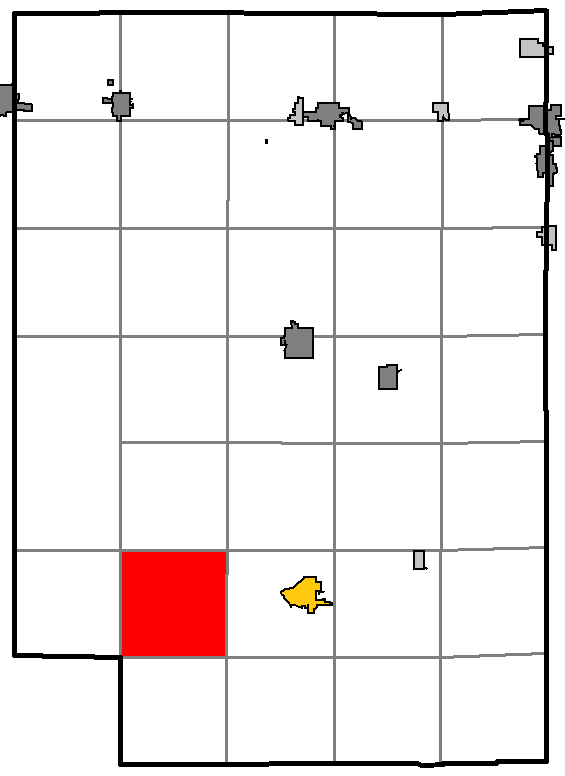
- Location of Hewett, Clark County

- Location of Clark County, Wisconsin
- Coordinates: 44°33′44″N 90°43′32″W
- Country: United States
- State: Wisconsin
- County: Clark

Area
  - Total: 35.8 sq mi (92.7 km^{2})
  - Land: 35.8 sq mi (92.6 km^{2})
  - Water: 0.039 sq mi (0.1 km^{2})
- Elevation: 1,004 ft (306 m)

Population (2020)
  - Total: 295
  - Density: 8.25/sq mi (3.19/km^{2})
- Time zone: UTC-6 (Central (CST))
  - Summer (DST): UTC-5 (CDT)
- Area codes: 715 & 534
- FIPS code: 55-34200
- GNIS feature ID: 1583382

Hewett is a town in Clark County in the U.S. state of Wisconsin. The population was 295 at the 2020 census. The unincorporated community of Columbia is located in the town.

== Geography ==
According to the United States Census Bureau, the town has a total area of 35.8 square miles (92.7 km^{2}), of which 35.8 square miles (92.6 km^{2}) is land and 0.04 square miles (0.1 km^{2}) (0.08%) is water.

== Demographics ==
As of the census of 2000, there were 314 people, 125 households, and 96 families residing in the town. The population density was 8.8 people per square mile (3.4/km^{2}). There were 200 housing units at an average density of 5.6 per square mile (2.2/km^{2}). The racial makeup of the town was 100.00% White. Hispanic or Latino people of any race were 0.32% of the population.

There were 125 households, out of which 31.2% had children under the age of 18 living with them, 70.4% were married couples living together, 4.8% had a female householder with no husband present, and 22.4% were non-families. 15.2% of all households were made up of individuals, and 8.0% had someone living alone who was 65 years of age or older. The average household size was 2.51 and the average family size was 2.84.

In the town, the population was spread out, with 22.3% under the age of 18, 5.1% from 18 to 24, 32.2% from 25 to 44, 25.8% from 45 to 64, and 14.6% who were 65 years of age or older. The median age was 40 years. For every 100 females, there were 102.6 males. For every 100 females age 18 and over, there were 105.0 males.

The median income for a household in the town was $46,111, and the median income for a family was $47,500. Males had a median income of $31,750 versus $23,594 for females. The per capita income for the town was $18,039. About 2.0% of families and 1.2% of the population were below the poverty line, including none of those under the age of eighteen or sixty-five or over.
