= Pine Valley, Wisconsin =

- Town
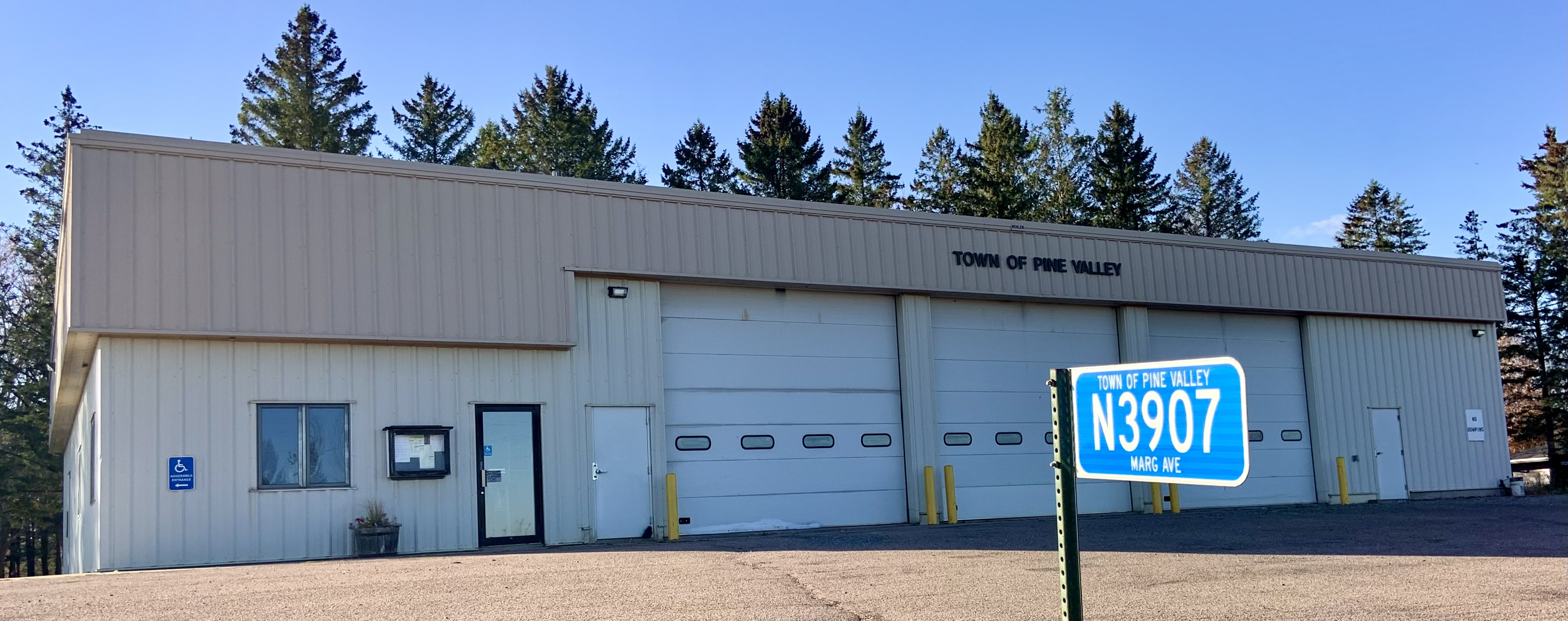
- Town hall

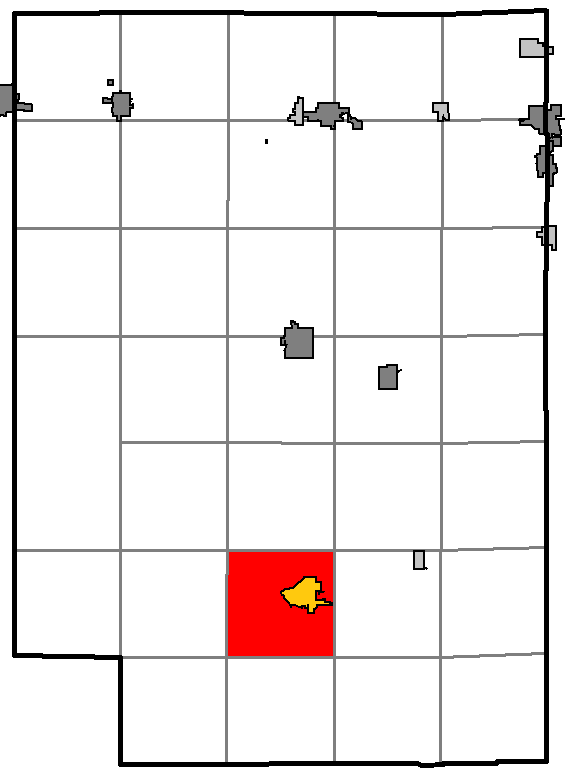
- Location of Pine Valley, Clark County

- Location of Clark County, Wisconsin
- Coordinates: 44°33′13″N 90°36′52″W
- Country: United States
- State: Wisconsin
- County: Clark

Area
  - Total: 33.5 sq mi (86.8 km^{2})
  - Land: 33.3 sq mi (86.3 km^{2})
  - Water: 0.19 sq mi (0.5 km^{2})
- Elevation: 1,037 ft (316 m)

Population (2020)
  - Total: 1,175
  - Density: 35.3/sq mi (13.6/km^{2})
- Time zone: UTC-6 (Central (CST))
  - Summer (DST): UTC-5 (CDT)
- Area codes: 715 & 534
- FIPS code: 55-63000
- GNIS feature ID: 1583927

Pine Valley is a town in Clark County in the U.S. state of Wisconsin. The population was 1,175 at the 2020 census. The unincorporated community of Sidney is located in the town.

== Geography ==
According to the United States Census Bureau, the town has a total area of 33.5 square miles (86.8 km^{2}), of which 33.3 square miles (86.3 km^{2}) is land and 0.2 square mile (0.5 km^{2}) (0.54%) is water.

== Demographics ==
As of the census of 2000, there were 1,121 people, 421 households, and 309 families residing in the town. The population density was 33.6 people per square mile (13.0/km^{2}). There were 464 housing units at an average density of 13.9 per square mile (5.4/km^{2}). The racial makeup of the town was 98.57% White, 0.09% African American, 0.89% Native American, and 0.45% from two or more races. Hispanic or Latino of any race were 0.98% of the population.

There were 421 households, out of which 33.5% had children under the age of 18 living with them, 62.5% were married couples living together, 5.2% had a female householder with no husband present, and 26.6% were non-families. 20.0% of all households were made up of individuals, and 10.2% had someone living alone who was 65 years of age or older. The average household size was 2.66 and the average family size was 3.08.

In the town, the population was spread out, with 27.1% under the age of 18, 6.4% from 18 to 24, 27.3% from 25 to 44, 25.4% from 45 to 64, and 13.7% who were 65 years of age or older. The median age was 39 years. For every 100 females, there were 101.3 males. For every 100 females age 18 and over, there were 108.4 males.

The median income for a household in the town was $37,813, and the median income for a family was $45,481. Males had a median income of $30,847 versus $20,781 for females. The per capita income for the town was $18,736. About 4.0% of families and 6.1% of the population were below the poverty line, including 9.0% of those under age 18 and 5.0% of those age 65 or over.
