= Decatur and Kate Dickinson House =

Historic house in Wisconsin, United States

- U.S. National Register of Historic Places
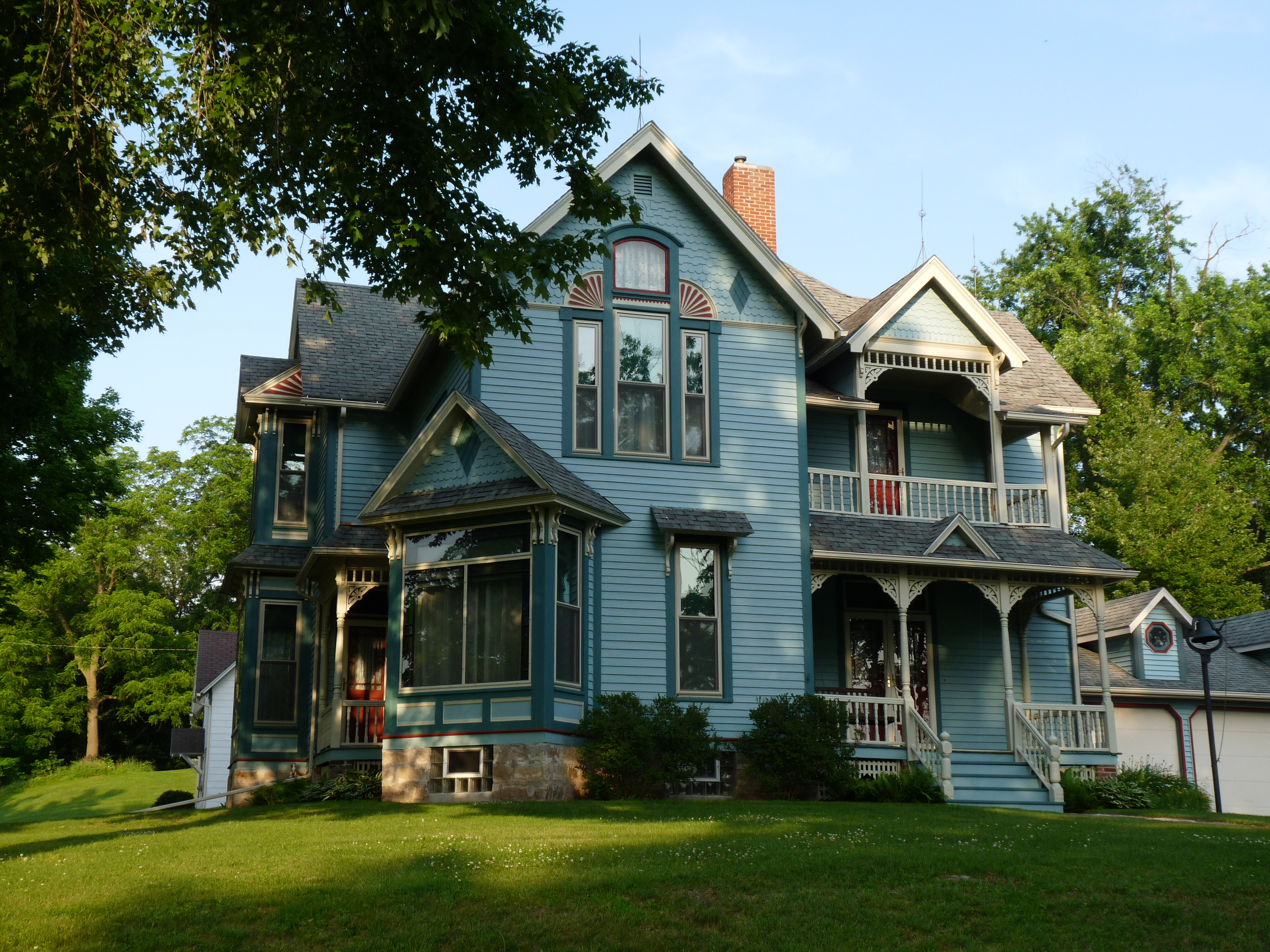
- Decatur and Kate Dickinson House

- Location within Wisconsin Location within the United States
- Location: 411 State Street; Neillsville, Wisconsin
- Coordinates: 44°33′35″N 90°35′34″W
- Area: less than one acre
- Built: 1891
- Architect: James J. McGillivray
- Architectural style: Queen Anne
- NRHP reference No.: 07000223
- Added to NRHP: March 27, 2007

The Decatur and Kate Dickinson House is a historic house located at 411 State Street in Neillsville, Wisconsin. It is locally significant as one of the best examples of the Queen Anne style in the city of Neillsville.

== Description and history ==
Completed in 1891, the 2 1/2-story house was designed by James J. McGillivray and is heavily adorned with ornamentation associated with the Queen Anne style of architecture, which was widely popular at the time of the houses construction. It was added to the National Register of Historic Places on March 27, 2007.
