= Laredo–Nuevo Laredo =

International transborder agglomeration in southern Texas and northwestern Tamaulipas

Coordinates: 27.500°N 99.503°W

- Transborder Agglomeration
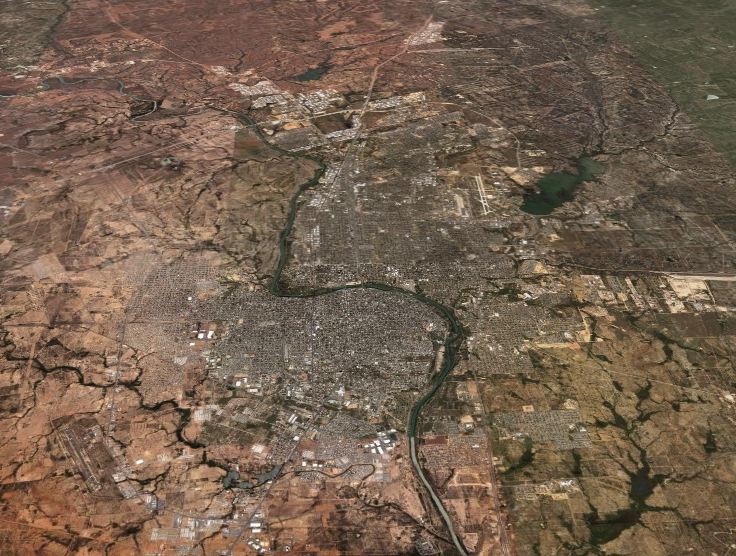
- Laredo Borderplex
- Nicknames: "Four-State Area", "Los Dos Laredos", "Quad State Area"
Interactive Map of Laredo–Nuevo Laredo
Transborder Agglomeration
City of Laredo
Laredo, TX MSA
City of Nuevo Laredo
Municipio de Nuevo Laredo
- Largest city: Laredo, Texas; Nuevo Laredo, Tamaulipas
- Other cities: Campanario; Rio Bravo; El Cenizo
- Subdivisions: Texas; Webb County Tamaulipas; Nuevo Laredo Municipality; Nuevo León; Anáhuac Municipality Coahuila; Hidalgo Municipality

Area
  - Total: 418.96 km^{2} (161.76 sq mi)

Population (2010 official U.S. Census / INEGI Census)
  - Total: 636,516
  - Estimate (2010): 675,481
  - Rank: 157th in the Americas (2008)
  - Density: 3,643/km^{2} (9,440/sq mi)

GDP
  - Laredo: US $17.0 billion
  - Nuevo Laredo: US $5.5 billion
  - Total: US $22.5 billion
- Time zone: UTC–06:00 (Zona Centro)
  - Summer (DST): UTC–05:00 (DST)

Laredo–Nuevo Laredo (UN/LOCODE: USLRD & MXNLD), otherwise known as the "Four-State Area" or the "Quad State Area", is one of six transborder agglomerations along the U.S.-Mexican border. The city of Laredo is situated in the U.S. state of Texas on the northern bank of the Rio Grande and Nuevo Laredo is located in the Mexican State of Tamaulipas in the southern bank of the river. This area is also known as the Two Laredos or the Laredo Borderplex. The area is made up of one county in the U.S (Webb County in Texas) and three municipalities in Mexico (Nuevo Laredo Municipality in Tamaulipas, Hidalgo Municipality in Coahuila, and Anáhuac Municipality in Nuevo León). Two urban areas (the Laredo Metropolitan Statistical Area and the Zona Metropolitana Nuevo Laredo [Nuevo Laredo Metropolitan Zone]), three cities, and 12 towns make the Laredo–Nuevo Laredo Metropolitan area. The two sides of the Borderplex are connected by four International Bridges and an International Railway Bridge. The Laredo–Nuevo Laredo Metropolitan area has a total of 636,516 inhabitants according to the INEGI Census of 2010 and the United States Census estimate of 2010. According to World Gazetteer this urban agglomeration ranked 157th largest in North and South America in 2010 with an estimated population of 675,481. This area ranks 66th in the United States and 23rd in Mexico.

== Populated Places ==
Historical population
Census	Pop.	Note	%±
1990	343,442		—
2000	519,801		51.4%
2010	636,516		22.5%
2020	706,245		11.0%

Laredo–Nuevo Laredo area is formed by the following populated places:

=== Urban Areas ===
- Nuevo Laredo: 425,058
- Laredo: 259,151

=== Cities ===
==== Texas ====
- Río Bravo: 5,553
- El Cenizo: 3,545

==== Tamaulipas ====
- Campanario: 4,538

=== Towns ===
==== Texas ====
- Laredo Ranchettes: 1,845
- Larga Vista: 742
- Penitas West: 520
- La Presa: 508

==== Coahuila ====
- Hidalgo: 1,638

==== Tamaulipas ====
- Álvarez: 1,257
- Nuevo Progreso: 393
- América: 263
- América II: 253
- Los Artistas: 175
- Miguel Alemán: 165
- La Cruz: 100

==== Nuevo León ====
- Colombia: 541

== History ==
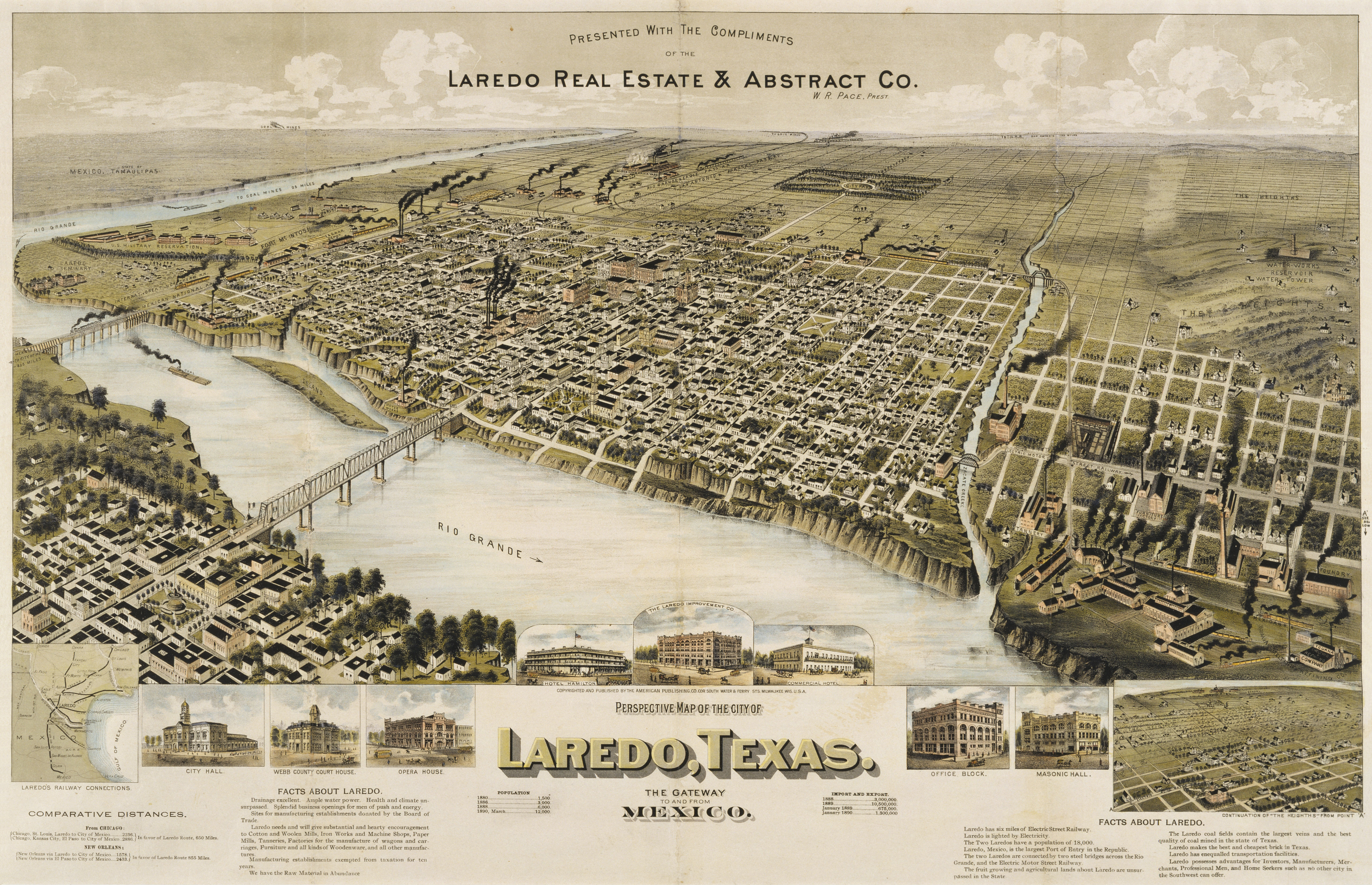
Map of Laredo in 1892

Villa de San Agustín de Laredo was founded in 1755 by Don Tomás Sánchez de la Barrera while the area was part of a region called Nuevo Santander in the Spanish colony of New Spain. Villa de San Agustín de Laredo got its name from Laredo, Cantabria, Spain and in honor of Saint Augustine of Hippo. In 1840, Laredo was the capital of the independent Republic of the Rio Grande, set up in rebellion to the dictatorship of Antonio López de Santa Anna and brought back into Mexico by military force. In 1846, during the Mexican–American War the town was occupied by the Texas Rangers. After the war the Treaty of Guadalupe-Hidalgo ceded the land to the United States. A referendum was taken in the town, which voted overwhelmingly to petition the American military government in charge of the area to return the town to Mexico. However, this petition was rejected, and in response the bulk of the population moved over the river into Mexican territory to found the new town of Nuevo Laredo.

The origin of name of Laredo is unclear. Some scholars say the name might stem from Glaretum which means "sandy, rocky place" others state that Laredo stems from Euskara and means "beautiful prairies". Laredo might also stem from Laridae which means gull or it might be made up of two Latin words lar which means home and edo which means birth.

== Economy ==
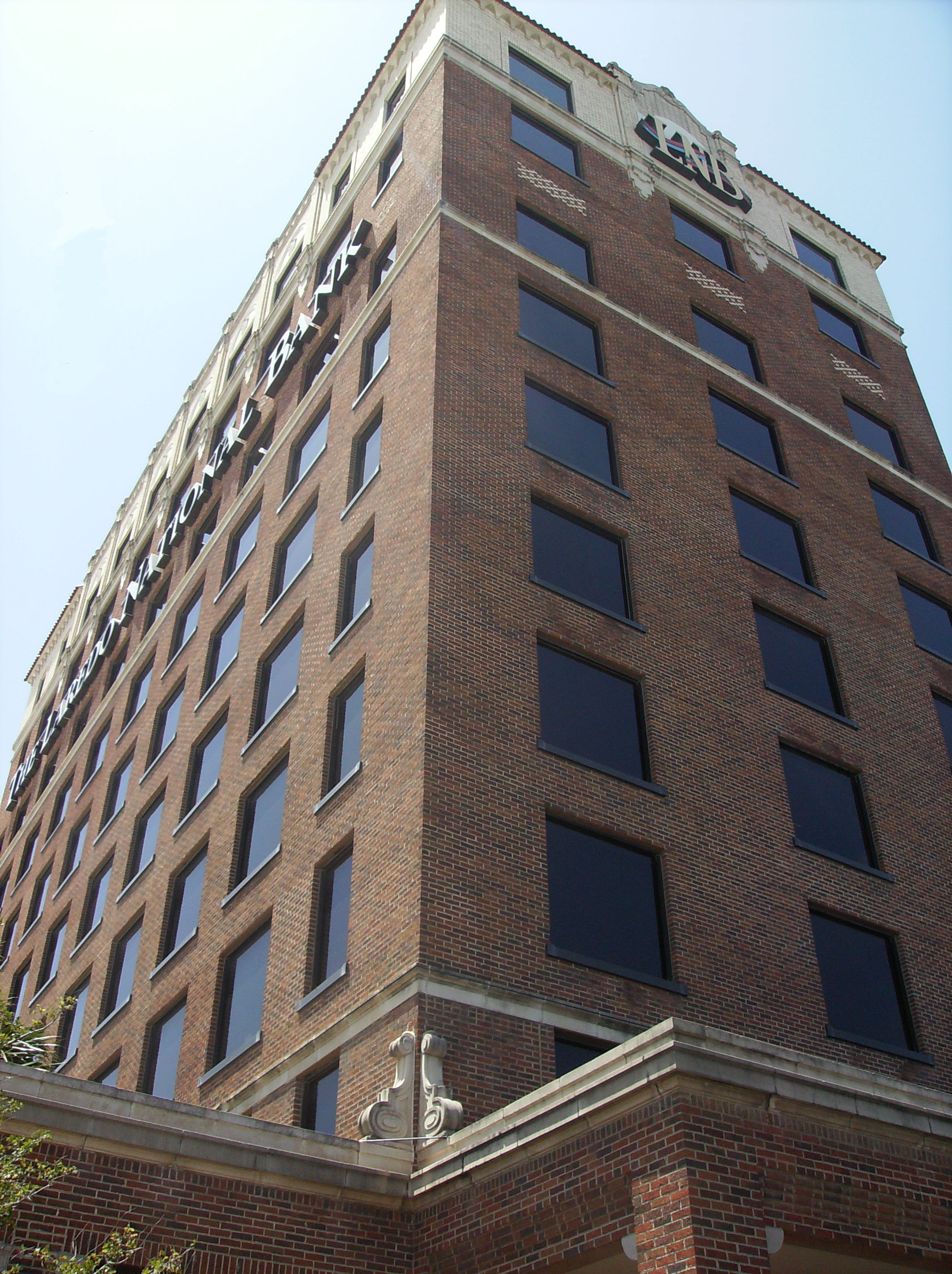
The Laredo National Bank is one of the strongest banking institutions in Laredo, Texas

=== Trade ===
Laredo is home to some of the most important transportation companies in the cross border industry. Forza Transportation headquarters are in Laredo where the company began operations. More than 47% of United States international trade headed for Mexico and more than 36% of Mexican international trade crosses through the Laredo–Nuevo Laredo port of entries. This is the reason that the borderplex's economy rotates around commercial and industrial warehousing, import, and export. The Laredo International Airport serves the Laredo area which has scheduled nonstop flights to Houston, Dallas, Orlando, and Las Vegas. The city of Nuevo Laredo has the Quetzalcóatl International Airport which has daily flights to Mexico City. These airports also handle merchandise to export to the neighboring country. The Laredo–Nuevo Laredo port of entry has five international bridges crossing the Rio Bravo in 2007.

==== International bridges ====
- Gateway to the Americas International Bridge
- Juárez-Lincoln International Bridge
- World Trade International Bridge (commercial traffic only)
- Colombia-Solidarity International Bridge
- Texas-Mexican Railway International Bridge

==== Major highways ====
Major highways in Laredo and their starting and ending points:

- Interstate 35 Laredo–Duluth
- U.S. Highway 59 Laredo–Lancaster
- U.S. Highway 83 Brownsville–Laredo–Westhope
- State Highway 255 Laredo–Colombia
- State Highway 359 Laredo–Skidmore

- Complete list of highways in Laredo, Texas

Major highways in Nuevo Laredo and their starting and ending points:

- Mexican Federal Highway 85 Nuevo Laredo–Mexico City
- Mexican Federal Highway 2 Matamoros–Nuevo Laredo–Colombia–Ciudad Acuña
- Tamaulipas State Highway 1 Nuevo Laredo–Monterrey
- Nuevo León State Highway Spur 1 Colombia–Anáhuac

=== Retail sales ===
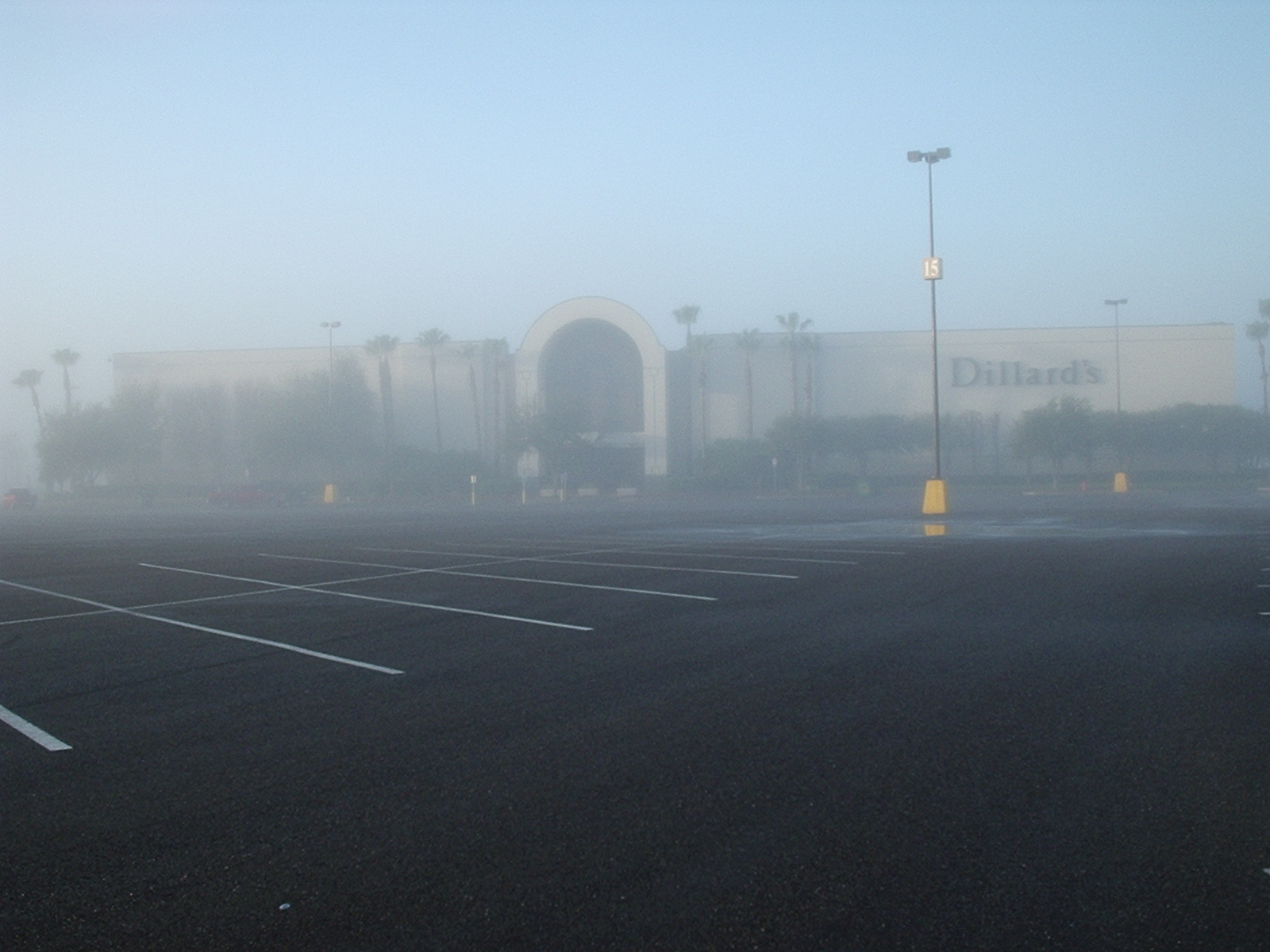
Foggy morning at Mall Del Norte

Retail sales also helps the Laredo–Nuevo Laredo economy, it attracts shoppers from Northern Mexico and South Texas. The major mall is Mall del Norte. The Streets of Laredo Urban Mall is an association created by businesses located in Iturbide Street in the San Agustin historical district to beautify and renovate the area.

== Media ==
=== Newspapers ===
Name	Frequency	Language	City	Website
Laredo Morning Times	Daily	English	Laredo	lmtonline.com
LareDOS	Monthly	English	Laredo	laredosnews.com
El Mañana	Daily	Spanish	Nuevo Laredo/Laredo	elmanana.com.mx
El Diario de Nuevo Laredo	Daily	Spanish	Nuevo Laredo	diario.net
Primera Hora	Daily	Spanish	Nuevo Laredo	primerahora.com
Última Hora	Daily	Spanish	Nuevo Laredo	ultimahora.com

=== Television ===
According to Nielsen Media Research, the Laredo region (which includes Webb and Zapata counties) is ranked 185th market by population size in the United States. The first station to broadcast in Laredo was KGNS in 1956, followed by KVTV in 1973, then KJTB (now KLDO) in 1985.

Notably television networks missing from Laredo's airwaves are PBS and The CW. Laredo once had a full-power local affiliate, KGNS-DT2 until the affiliation switched to ABC. Prior to that KJTB channel 27, was affiliated to ABC from January 1985 to October 1988. KJTB was later bought by Entravision and affiliated the station to Telemundo and changed its callsign to KLDO. Today KLDO is affiliated to Univision. Before KJTB, KGNS, an NBC affiliate had a secondary affiliation to ABC from its founding in 1956 through KJTB's founding in 1985. On November 6, 2013, KGNS reached an agreement with the ABC Television Network to add the ABC affiliation. The launch for the ABC affiliate will be in February 2014 on KGNS's subchannel 8.2 and will carry ABC's entire schedule. It's unknown if Laredo CW 19 would move to either 8.3 or to just disaffiliate with the network entirely.

In December 2014, all Nuevo Laredo stations must discontinue analog television broadcasting and broadcast digitally only.

VC	DT	Callsign	Network	Resolution	City of License	Official Website	Notes
1.1	23.1	XHLNA	Azteca Uno	HD 1080i	Nuevo Laredo	tvazteca.com	•
1.2	23.2	XHLNA-TDT2	ADN 40	SD 480i	Nuevo Laredo	adn40.mx	•
2.1	29.1	XHLAR	Las Estrellas	HD 1080i	Nuevo Laredo	lasestrellas.tv	•
3.1	35.1	XHCTNL	Imagen Televisión	HD 1080i	Nuevo Laredo	imagentv.com	•
3.4	35.4	XHCTNL-TDT4	Excélsior TV	SD 480i	Nuevo Laredo	excelsior.com	•
4.1	25.1	XHBR	Televisa Nuevo Laredo	HD 1080i	Nuevo Laredo	televisaregional.com	•
5.1	25.1	XHBR-TDT2	Canal 5	SD 480i	Nuevo Laredo	televisa.com	•
6.1	32.1	XHNAT	Multimedios Plus	HD 720p	Nuevo Laredo	multimedios.com	•
6.2	32.2	XHNAT-TDT2	Milenio TV	SD 480i	Nuevo Laredo	milenio.com	•
6.3	32.3	XHNAT-TDT3	Teleritmo	SD 480i	Nuevo Laredo	multimedios.com	•
6.4	32.4	XHNAT-TDT4	MVS TV	SD 480i	Nuevo Laredo	mvstv.com	•
7.1	33.2	XHLAT-TDT	Azteca 7	HD 1080i	Nuevo Laredo	tvazteca.com	•
7.2	33.9	XHLAT-TDT2	a+	SD 480i	Nuevo Laredo	tvazteca.com	•
8.1	8.3	KGNS	NBC	HD 1080i	Laredo	kgns.tv	•
8.2	8.4	KGNS-DT2	ABC	HD 720p	Laredo	kgns.tv	•
8.3	8.5	KGNS-DT3	Telemundo	HD 720p	Laredo	telemundolaredo.tv	•
8.5	8.7	KGNS-DT5	True Crime Network	SD 480i	Laredo	truecrimenetworktv.com	•
10.1	10.1	KXNU	Telemundo	HD 720p	Laredo	telemundolaredo.tv	•
13.1	13.3	KYLX	CBS	HD 1080i	Laredo	cbs.com	•
13.2	13.4	KYLX-LD2	The CW	SD 480i	Laredo	yourcwtv.com	•
15.1	15.1	KLMV	BVB	SD 480i	Laredo	•	•
15.2	15.2	KLMV-LD2	Infomercials	SD 480i	Laredo	•	•
15.3	15.3	KLMV-LD3	Vida Vision	SD 480i	Laredo	•	•
15.4	15.4	KLMV-LD4	Televida Laredo	SD 480i	Laredo	•	•
17.1	17.1	XEFE	Televisa Local	HD 1080i	Nuevo Laredo	xefetv.com	•
27.1	19.1	KLDO	Univision	HD 1080i	Laredo	noticiasya.com	•
27.2	19.2	KLDO-DT2	LATV	SD 480i	Laredo	latv.com	•
27.3	19.3	KLDO-DT3	TBD	SD 480i	Laredo	tbd.com	•
27.4	19.4	KLDO-DT4	Stadium	SD 480i	Laredo	watchstadium.com	•
27.5	19.5	KLDO-DT5	Court TV	SD 480i	Laredo	courttv.com	•
31.1	31.1	KXOF	Fox / MyNet	HD 720p	Laredo	foxnewssouthtexas.com	•
31.2	31.2	KXOF-CD2	Grit	SD 480i	Laredo	grittv.com	•
31.3	31.3	KXOF-CD3	Laff	SD 480i	Laredo	laff.com	•
39.1	27.1	KETF	Unimas	HD 720p	Laredo	ketftv.com	•
39.2	27.2	KETF-CD2	Comet	SD 480i	Laredo	comettv.com	•
39.3	27.3	KETF-CD3	Charge!	SD 480i	Laredo	watchcharge.com	•
39.4	27.4	KETF-CD4	Azteca America	HD 720p	Laredo	aztecaamerica.com	•

=== Radio ===
According to Arbitron, the Laredo region (which includes Jim Hogg, Webb, and Zapata counties) is ranked 191st market by population size.

==== AM radio ====
Frequency	Callsign	Brand	City of License	Website	Webcast
530	WPMQ285	TxDOT HAR	Laredo	•	•
790	XEFE	La Mera Ley	Nuevo Laredo	•	listen live
890	KVOZ	Radio Cristiana	Laredo	lanuevaradiocristiana.com	•
960	XEK	La Grande	Nuevo Laredo	xek.com	listen live
1000	XENLT	Radio Formula	Nuevo Laredo	radioformula.com	listen live
1090	XEWL	La Romantica	Nuevo Laredo	radiorama.com	listen live
1300	KLAR	Radio Poder	Laredo	feypoder.com	listen live
1340	XEBK	Mega 95.7	Nuevo Laredo	radiorama.com	listen live
1370	XEGNK	Radio Mexicana	Nuevo Laredo	radiorama.com	listen live
1410	XEAS	Ke Buena	Nuevo Laredo	kebuena.com	listen live
1490	KLNT	Super Tejano	Laredo	klnt1490.com	listen live
1550	XENU	La Rancherita	Nuevo Laredo	radiorama.com	listen live
1610	WQA200	CBP Information	Laredo	•	•

==== FM radio ====
Frequency	Callsign	Brand	Format	City of License	Website	Webcast
88.1	KHOY	Catholic Radio	Religious	Laredo	khoy.org	listen live
88.9	XHLDO	Radio Tamaulipas	Public Radio	Nuevo Laredo	tamaulipas.gob	listen live
89.9	KBNL	Radio Manantial	Spanish Religious	Laredo	kbnl.com	listen live
91.3	XHNOE	Stereo 91	Spanish Contemporary	Nuevo Laredo	xhnoe.com	listen live
92.7	KJBZ	Z93	Tejano	Laredo	z93laredo.com	listen live
93.7	"XHNLT"^{PR}	Radio Estereo Uncion FM	Christian Radio	Nuevo Laredo	uncionfeypoder.com	listen live
94.1	XHTLN	Imagen / RMX Laredo	Talk / Contemporary	Nuevo Laredo	rmx.com.mx	listen live
94.9	KQUR	Digital 94.9	Spanish Pop	Laredo	digital949.com	listen live
95.3	XHLPZ	La Traviesa	Spanish Regional	Lampazos	•	•
95.7	XHBK	Mega 95.7	Spanish Contemporary	Nuevo Laredo	radioavanzado.com	listen live
96.5	"XHTWO"^{PR}	Radio Two	Norteño	Nuevo Laredo	•	listen live
97.1	XHNLO	La Caliente	Norteño	Nuevo Laredo	mmradio.com	listen live
98.1	KRRG	Big Buck Country	Country	Laredo	bigbuck98.com	listen live
99.3	XHNK	40 Principales	Top 40	Nuevo Laredo	radiorama.com	listen live
100.5	KBDR	La Ley	Tejano	Laredo	laley1005.com	listen live
101.5	XHAS	Ke Buena	Norteño	Nuevo Laredo	kebuena.com	listen live
102.3	XHMW	Stereo Vida	AC/Oldies	Nuevo Laredo	radiorama.com	listen live
102.9	none^{PR}	La Guerrera de la Frontera	International	Nuevo Laredo	laguerrera.mx	listen live
103.3	none^{PR}	Radio 33	Spanish Religious	Nuevo Laredo	feypoder.com	listen live
104.5	none^{PR}	2 Beat	Electronica	Nuevo Laredo	•	•
104.9	XHNLR	Radio UAT	University Radio	Nuevo Laredo	uat.mx	listen live
105.1	none^{PR}	RN Radio	Spanish	Nuevo Laredo	rn105.com	listen live
105.5	none^{PR}	Mas Musica	Spanish	Nuevo Laredo	•	•
106.1	KNEX	Hot 106.1	Urban / Rhythmic Top 40	Laredo	hot1061.com	listen live
106.5	none^{PR}	Radio Voz	Norteño	Nuevo Laredo	radiovoz1065.net	listen live
107.3	XHGTS	107.3 Me Gusta	Spanish Pop	Nuevo Laredo	xhgts.com	listen live
162.55	WXK26	NOAA Weather Radio	Weather	Laredo	noaa.gov	•

^{PR}:Suspected pirate radio stations since they are not licensed with Federal Communications Commission (FCC) in the United States or COFETEL in Mexico. Some pirate stations are suspected, due to the fact that other licensed stations nearby share the same frequency, such as 106.5 Radio Voz and KMAE from nearby Bruni, Texas and 103.3 Radio 33 and XHAHU-FM from nearby Anáhuac, Nuevo León, each city less than 50 miles from Laredo.

== Sports ==
Laredo is home to four semiprofessional sports teams. The Laredo Bucks are a Central Hockey League hockey team in the Southern Conference's Southeast Division. The Bucks have been the League's Champion twice in 2003 and 2005. The Laredo Heat is a Premier Development League soccer team in the Southern Conference's Mid South Division. Laredo are the current USL Premier Development League champions, having defeated 2006 champions Michigan Bucks in a penalty shootout, following a 0-0 draw in the 2007 championship game. The Laredo Broncos are a baseball team in the United League. Nuevo Laredo is home to the Mexican Soccer League's Second Division Bravos de Nuevo Laredo. Both Laredo were home to the Tecolotes de los Dos Laredos which were the only Mexican Baseball League team to play in both the United States and Mexico. The Tecolotes de los Dos Laredos were the Mexican Baseball League Champions in 1953, 1954, 1958, 1977, and 1989. In 2008 the Tecolotes came back to Nuevo Laredo and they are known as the Tecolotres de Nuevo Laredo.

== Gallery ==
=== Pictures of Laredo, Texas ===
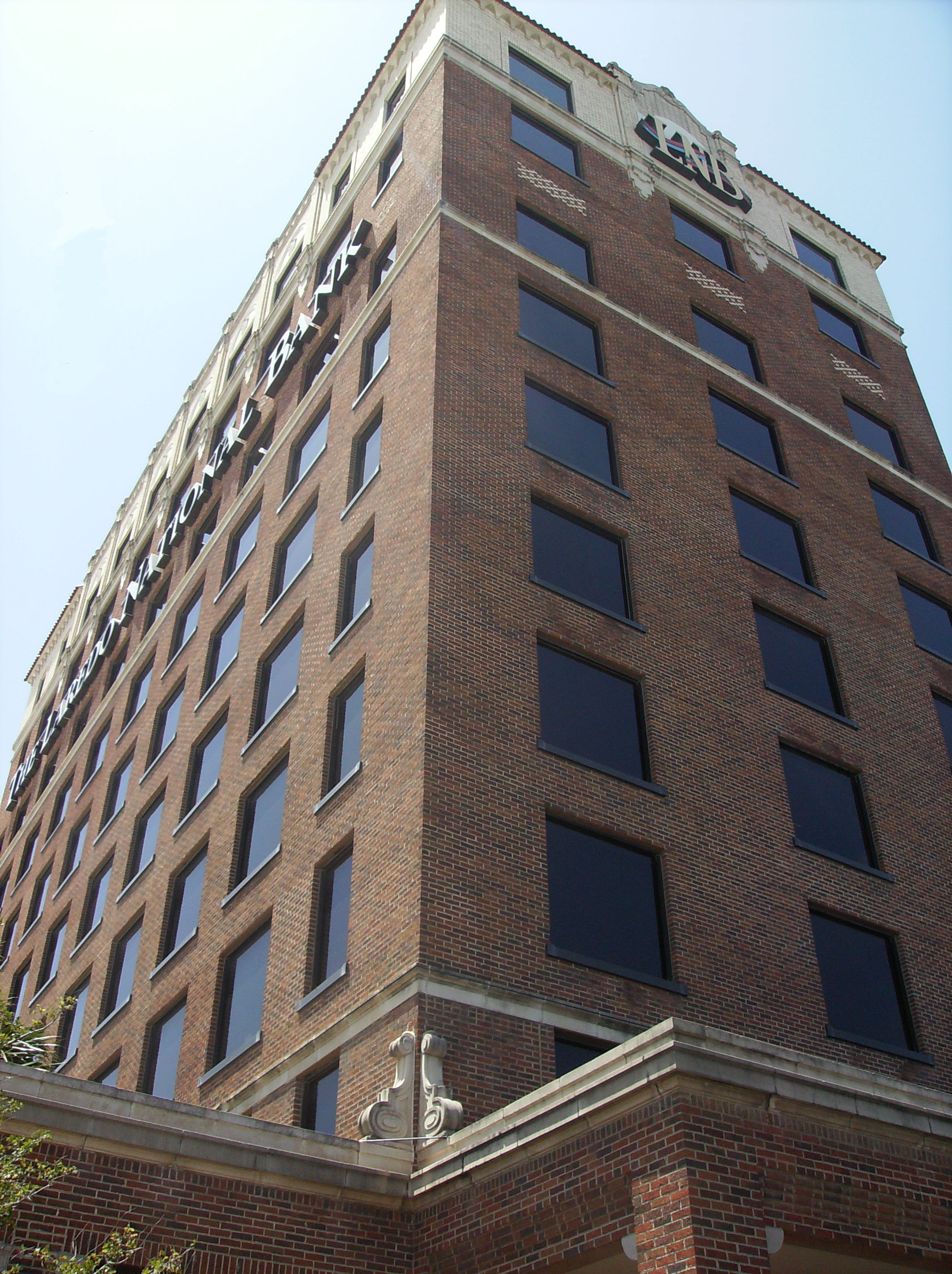
Laredo National Bank Headquarters

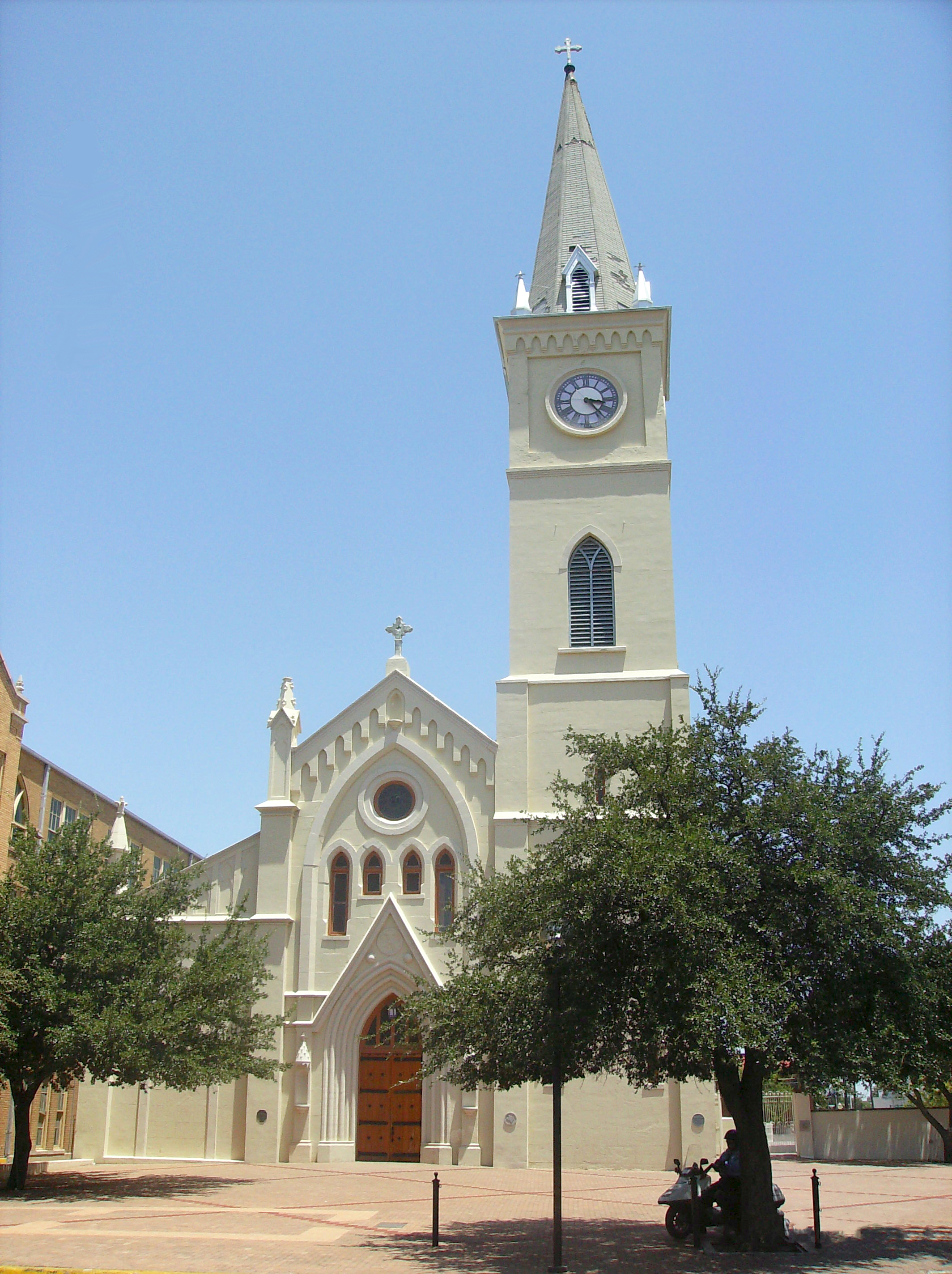
San Agustin Cathedral in Laredo

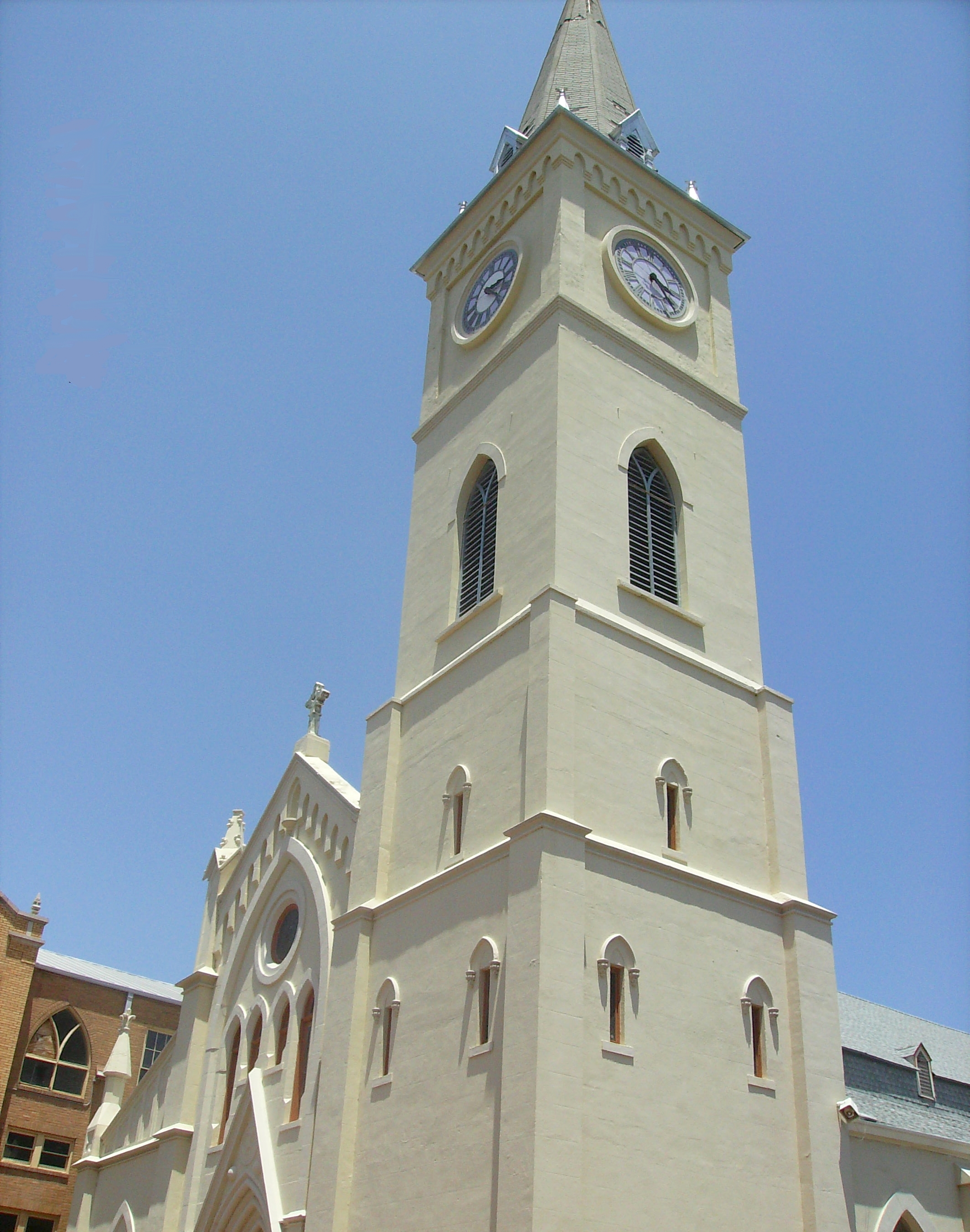
San Agustin Cathedral Tower

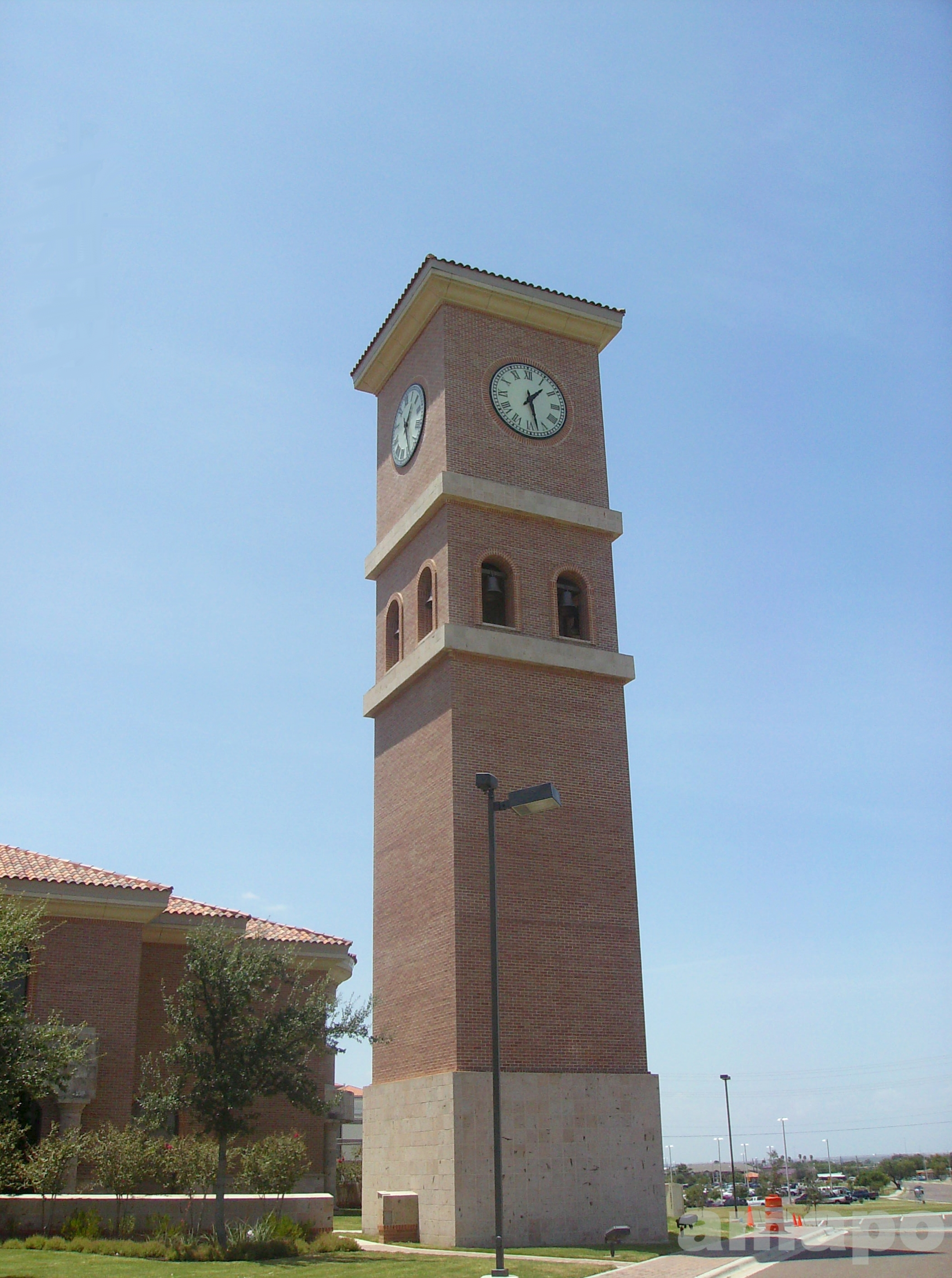
University of Texas Health Science Center Laredo Campus Clock Tower

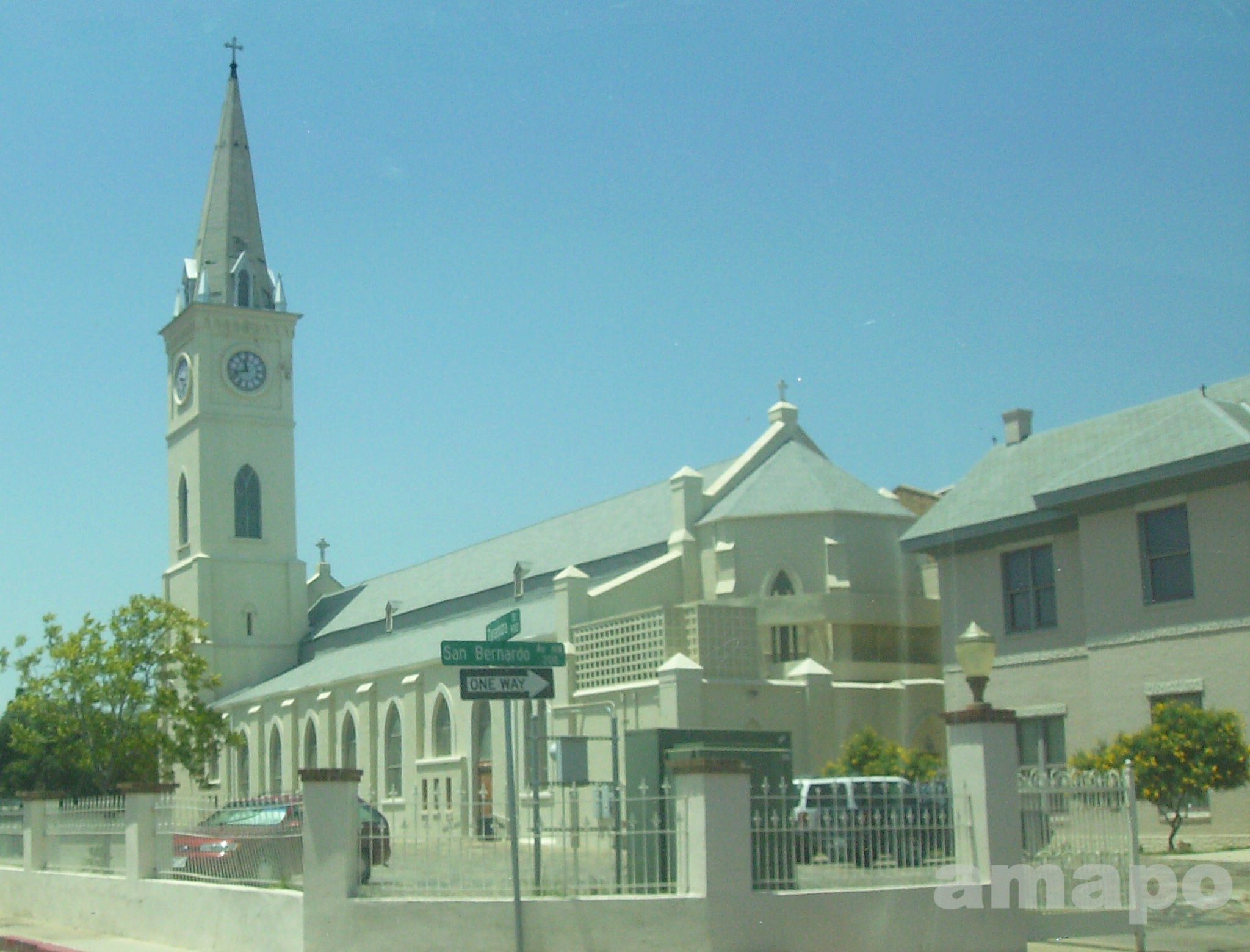
San Agustin Cathedral rear

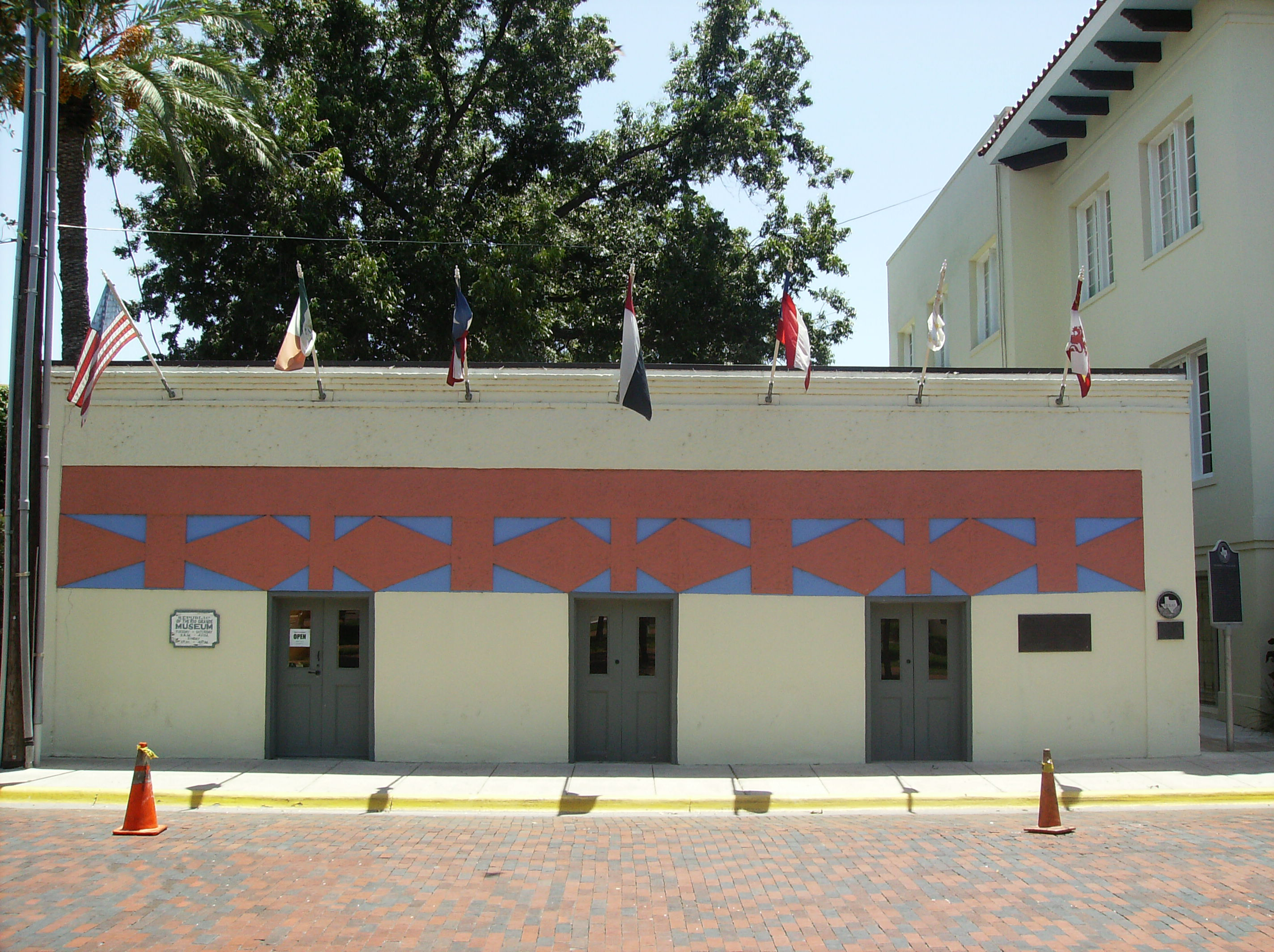
Republic of the Rio Grande Capitol Building Museum

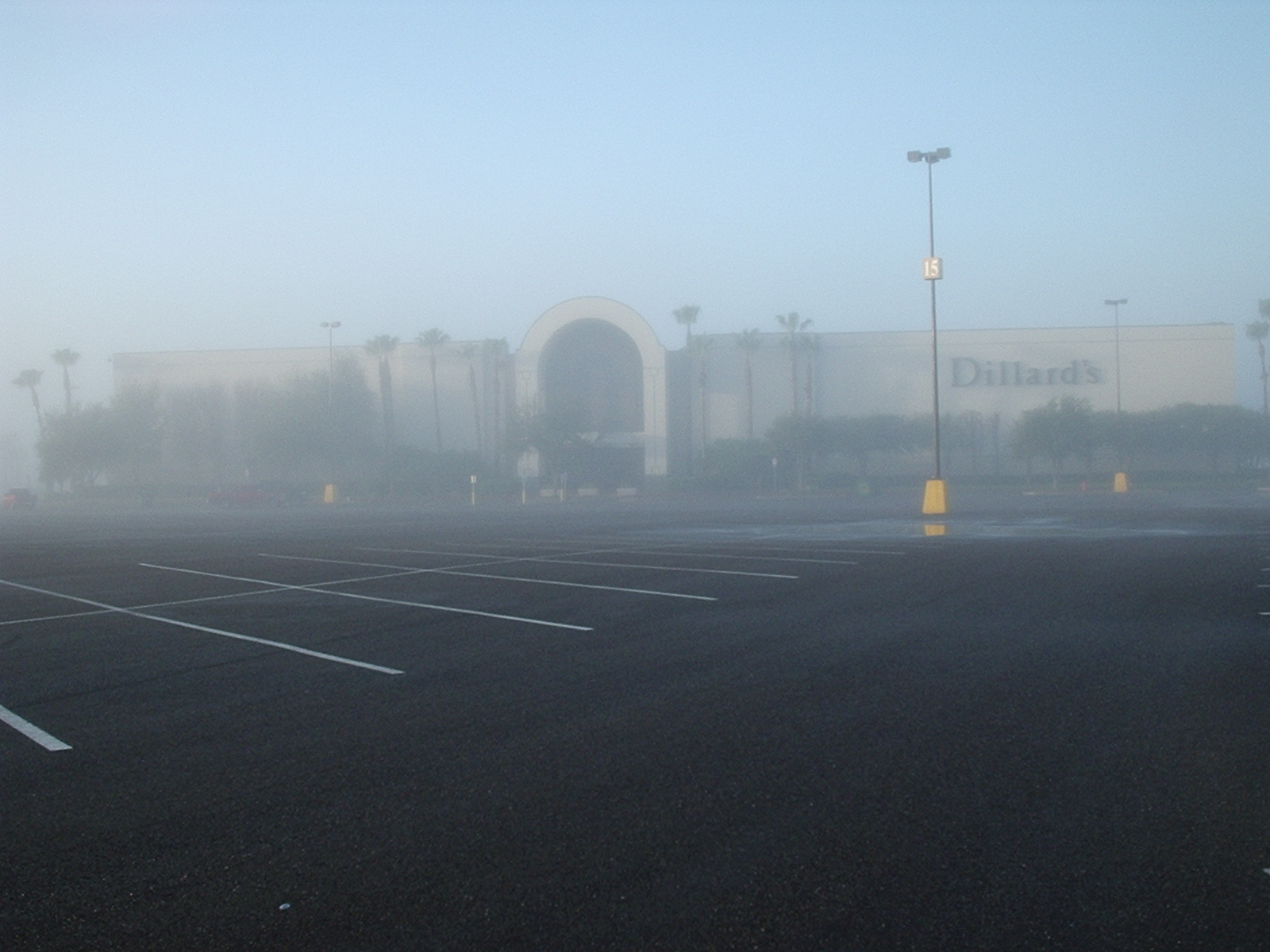
Foggy morning at the Mall del Norte

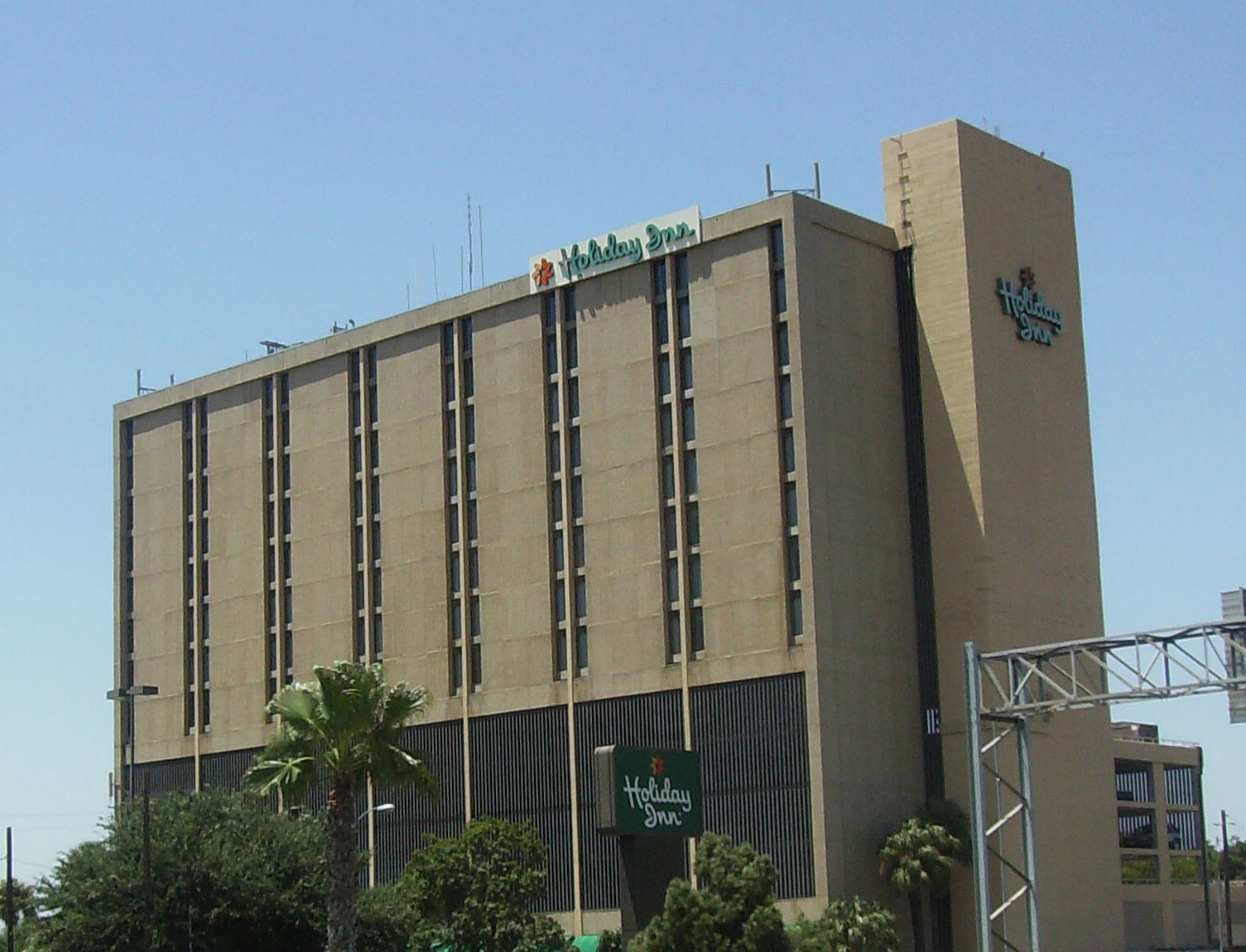
Holiday Inn in Laredo

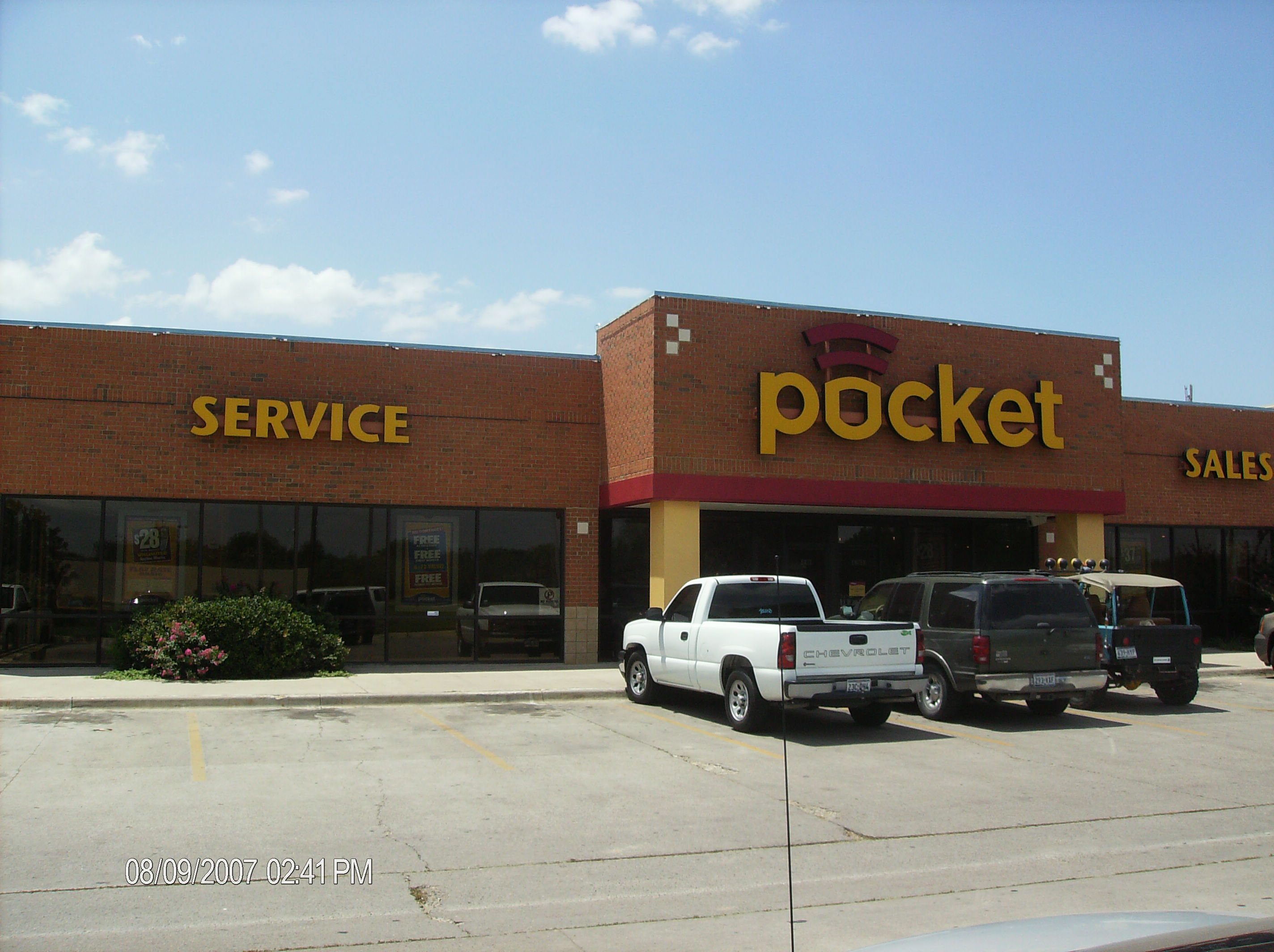
Pocket Communications Laredo Branch

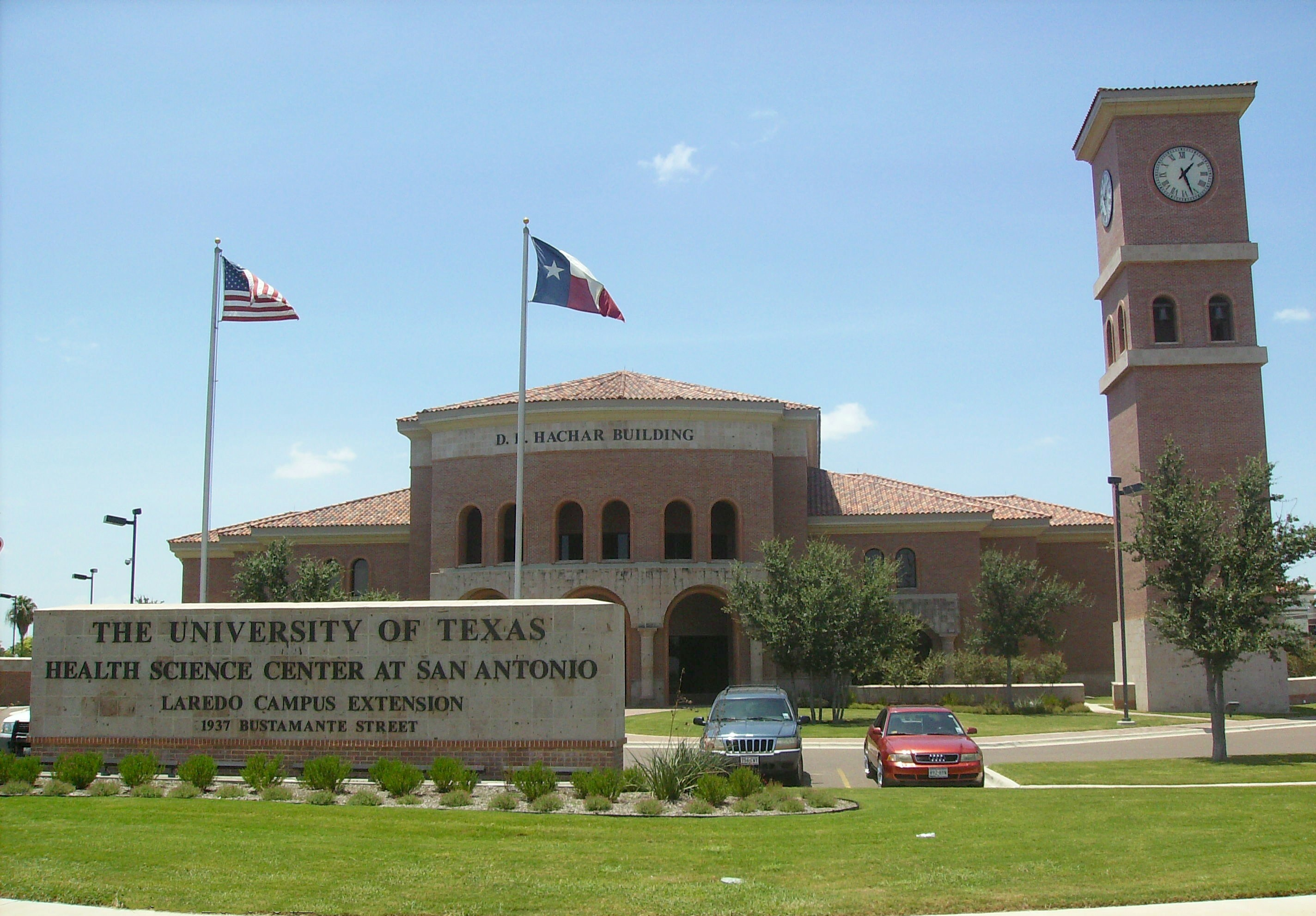
University of Texas Health and Science Center Laredo Campus

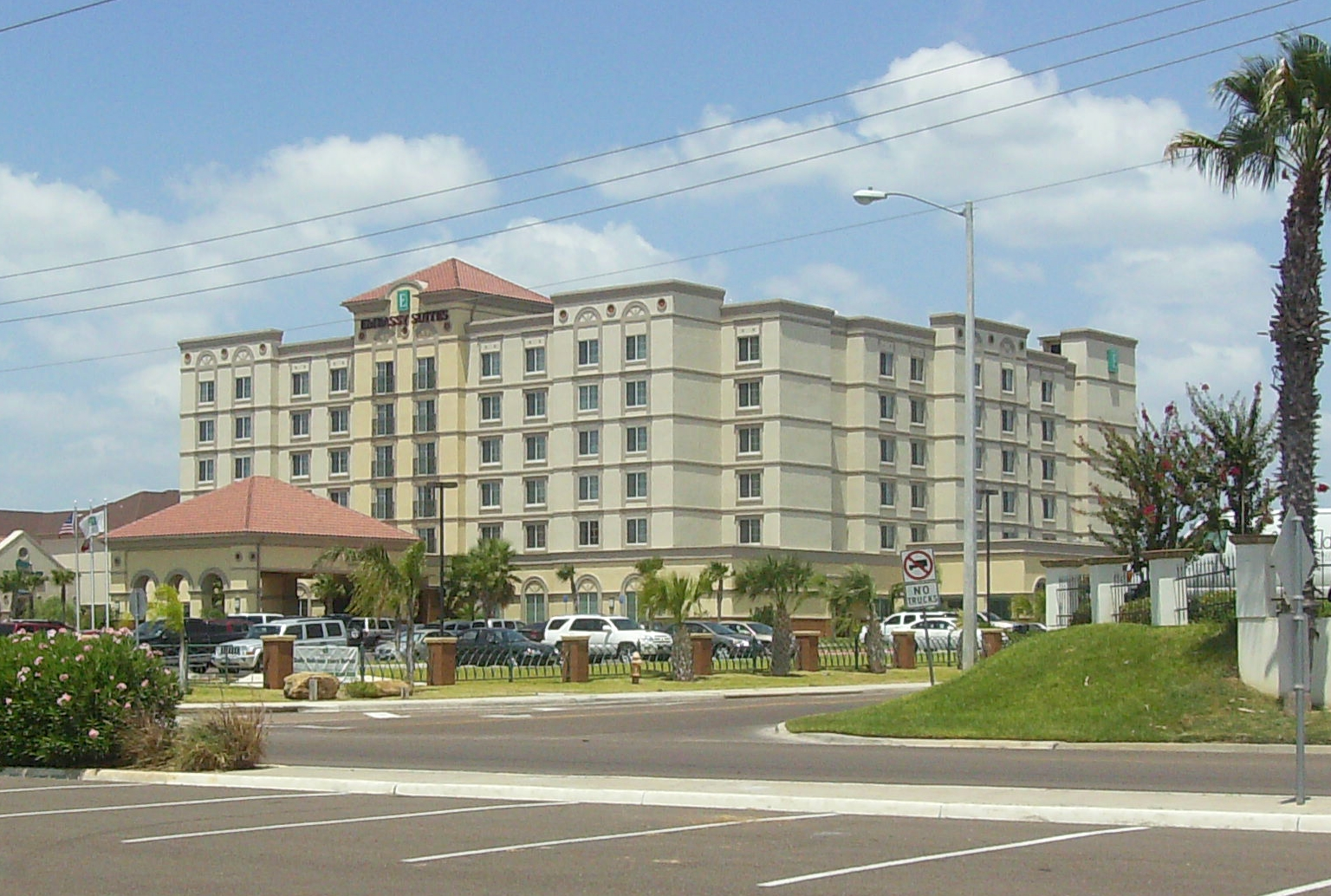
Embassy Suites in Laredo

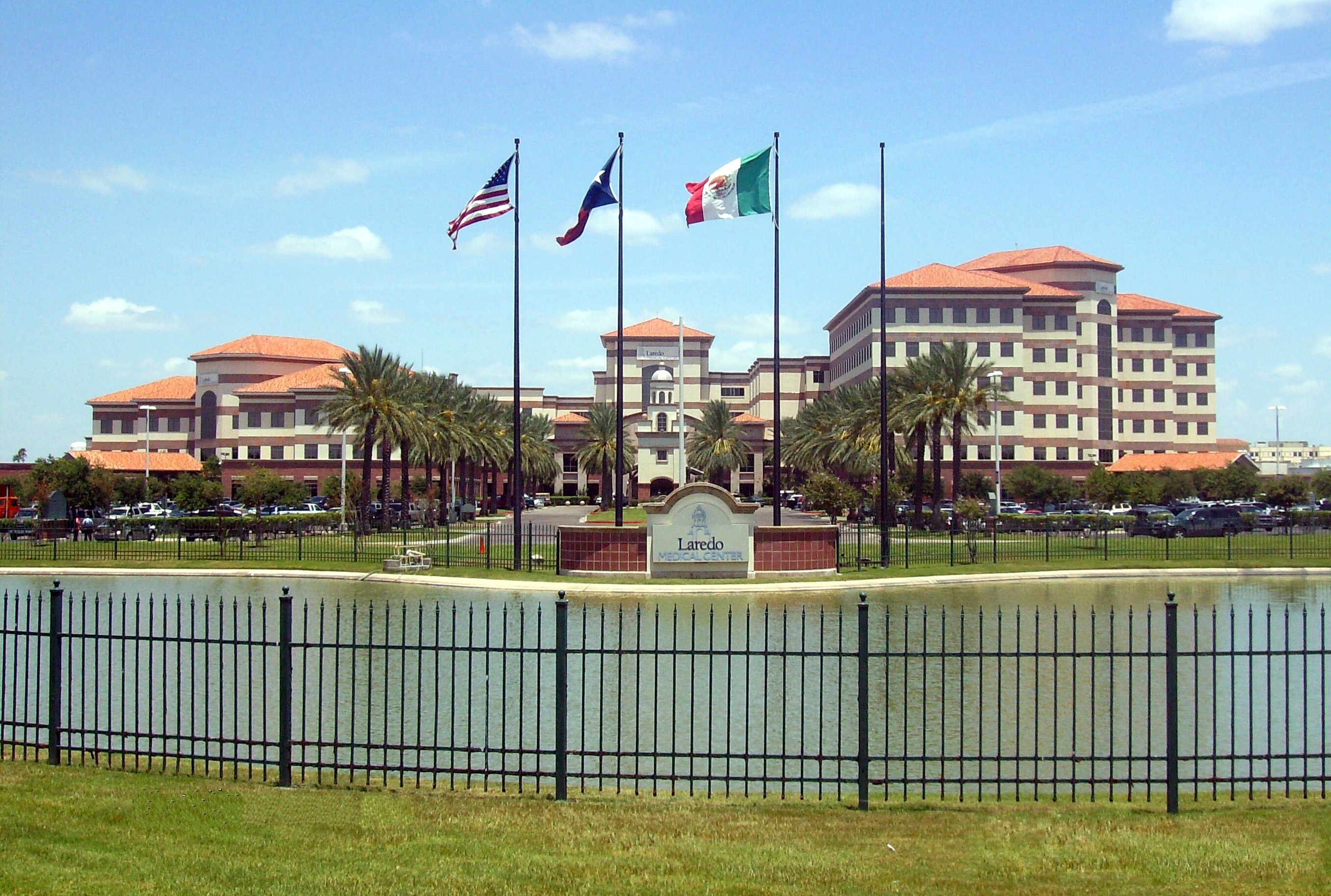
Laredo Medical Center

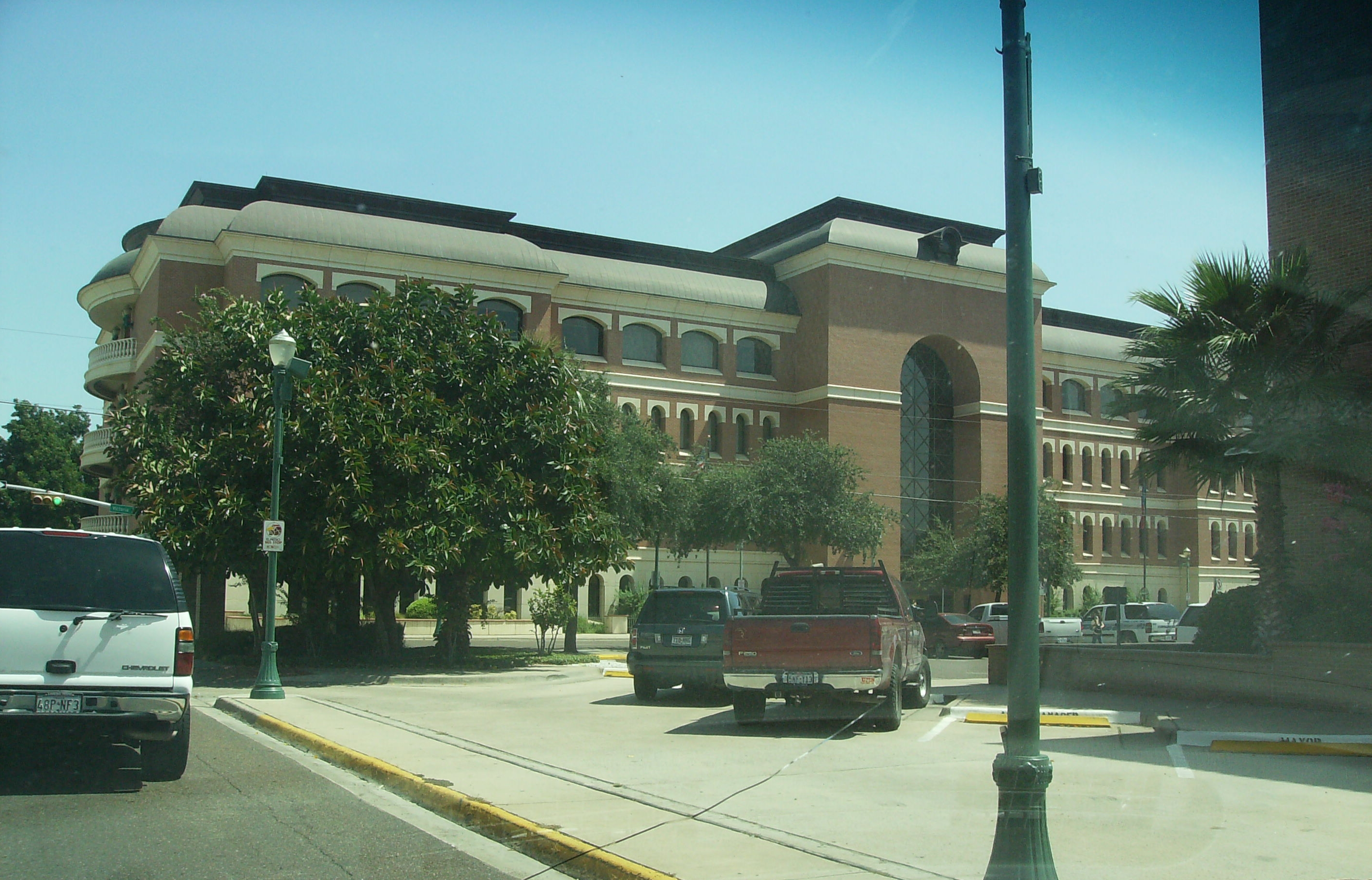
Webb County administration building

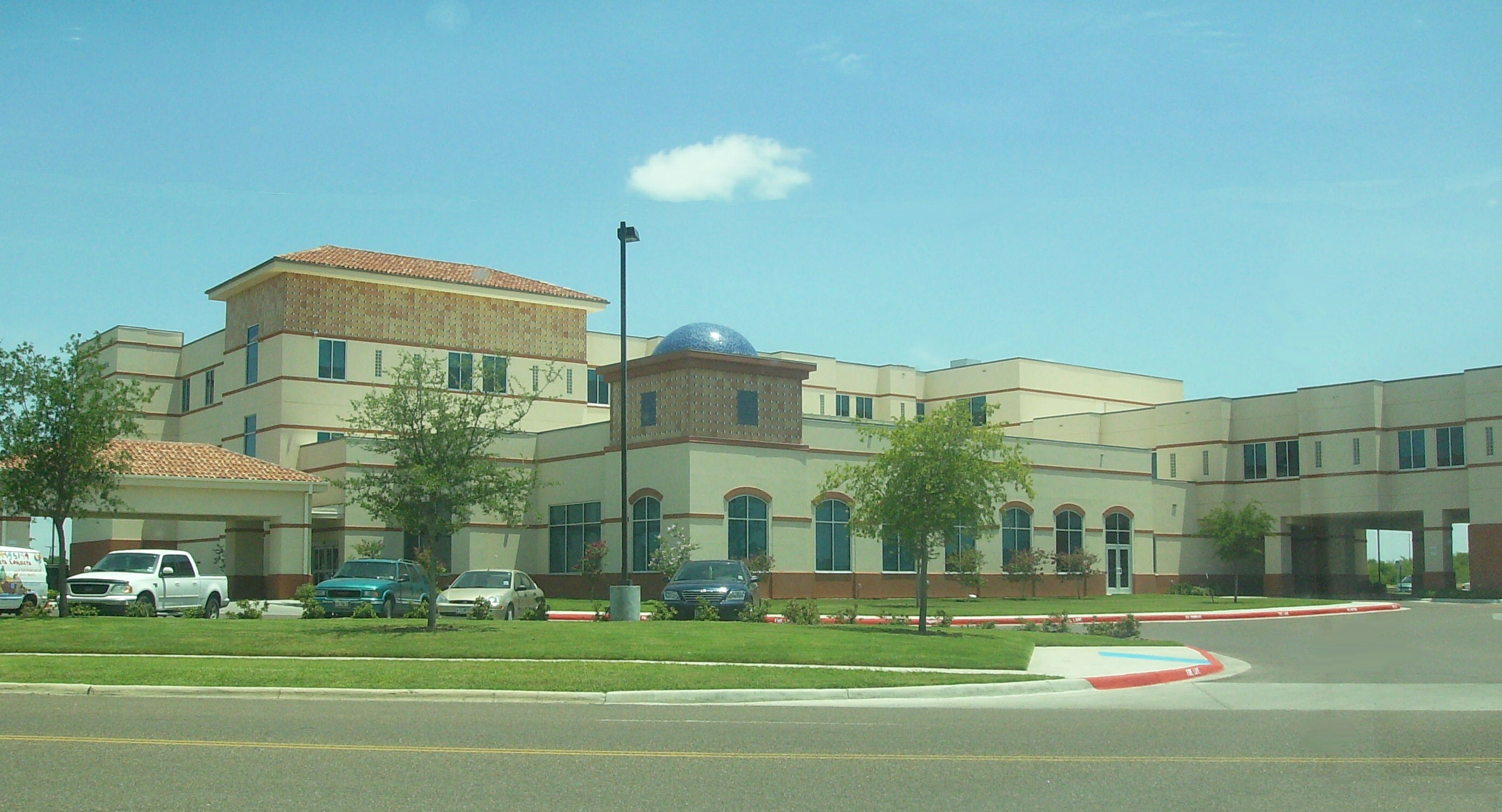
Laredo Community Health Center

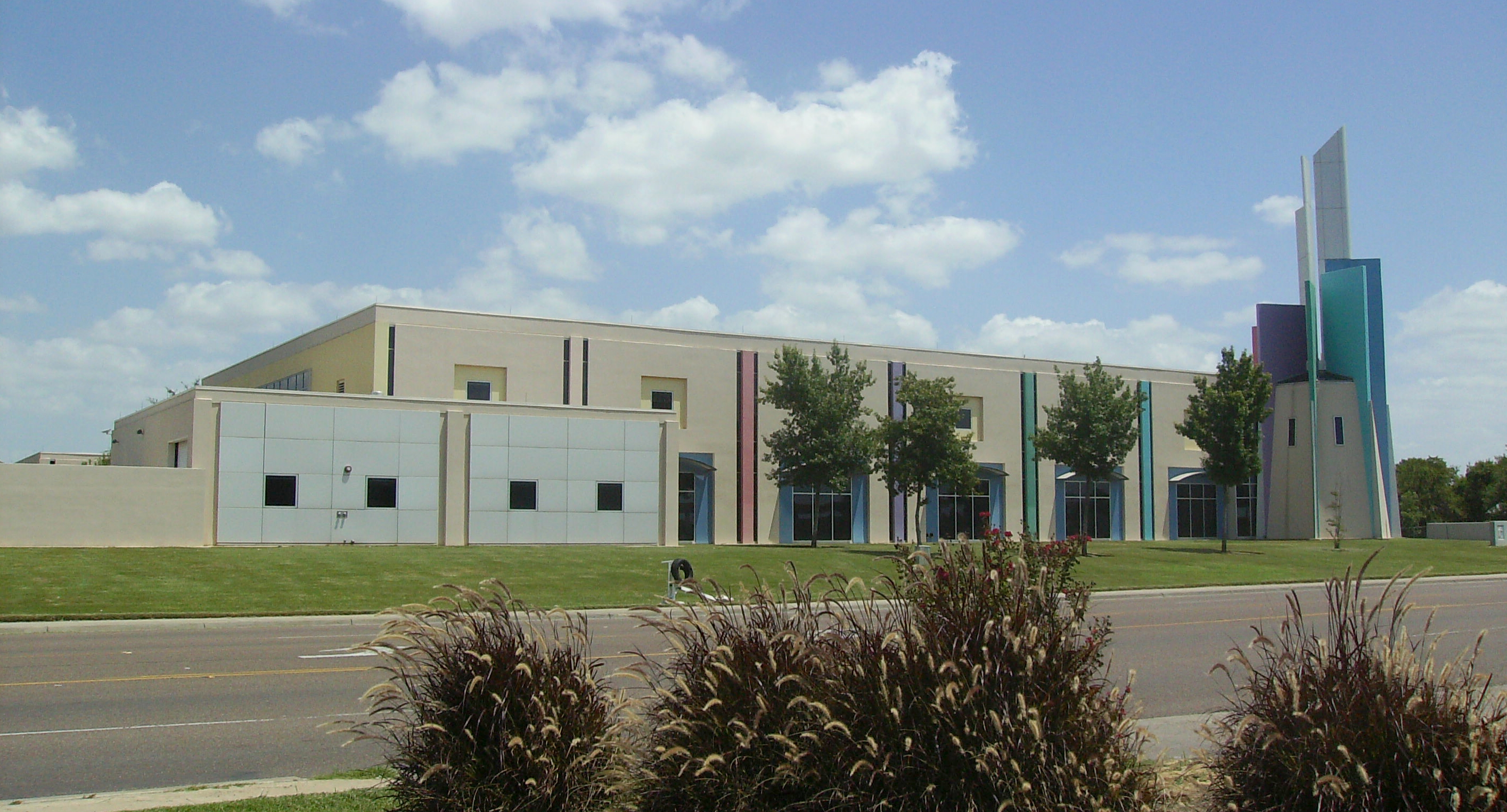
Laredo Public Library

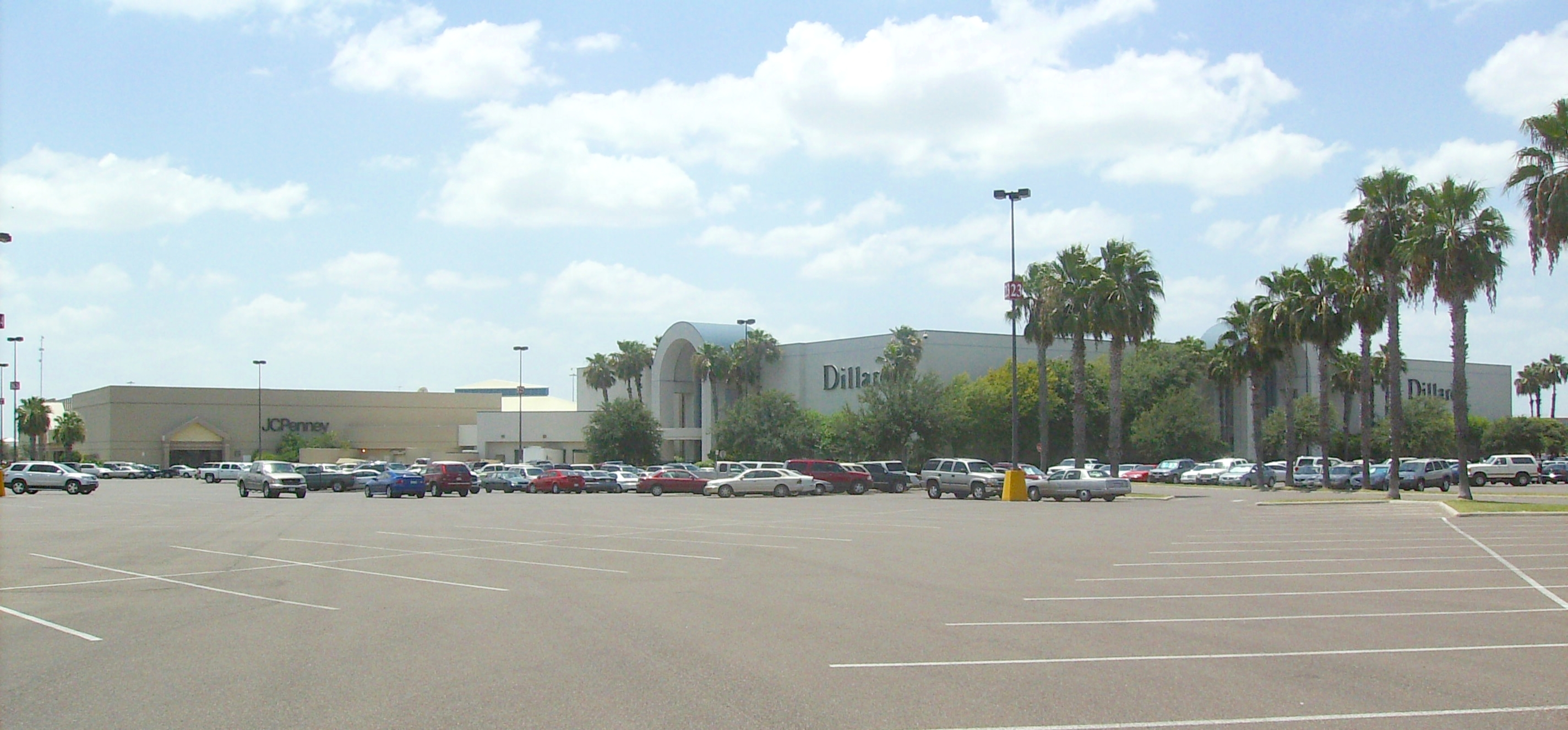
Mall del Norte Northwest wing

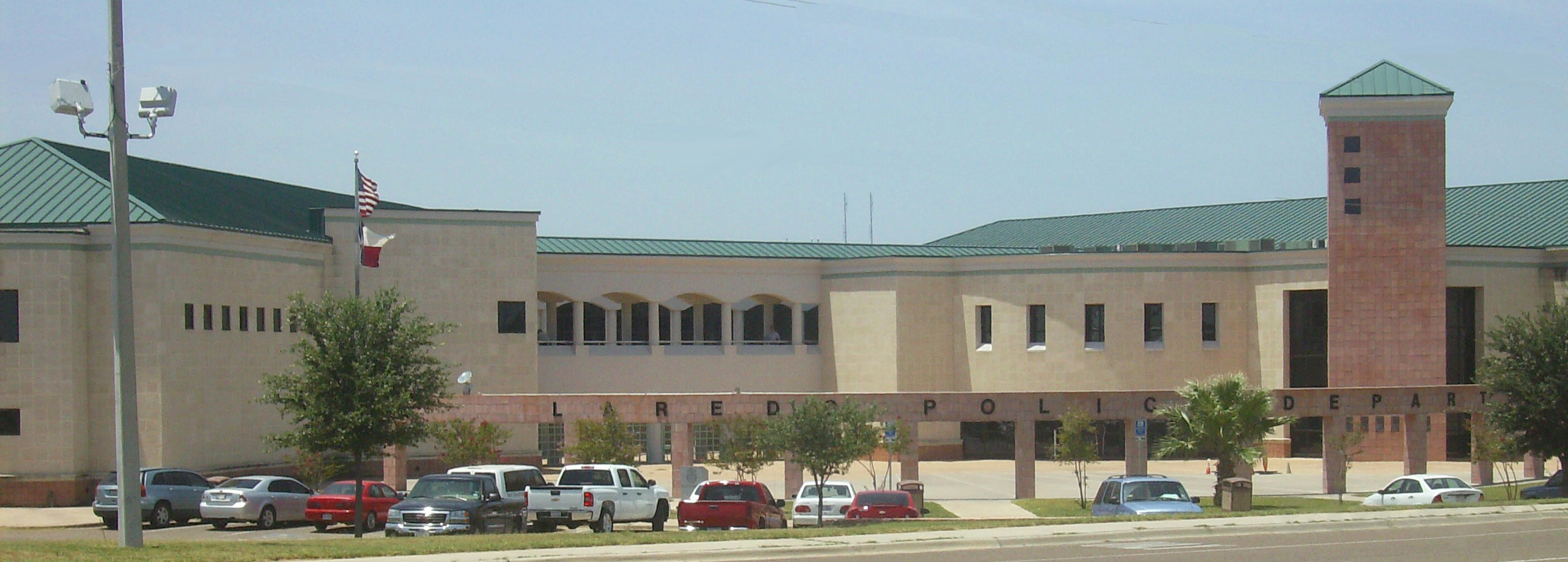
Laredo Police Department

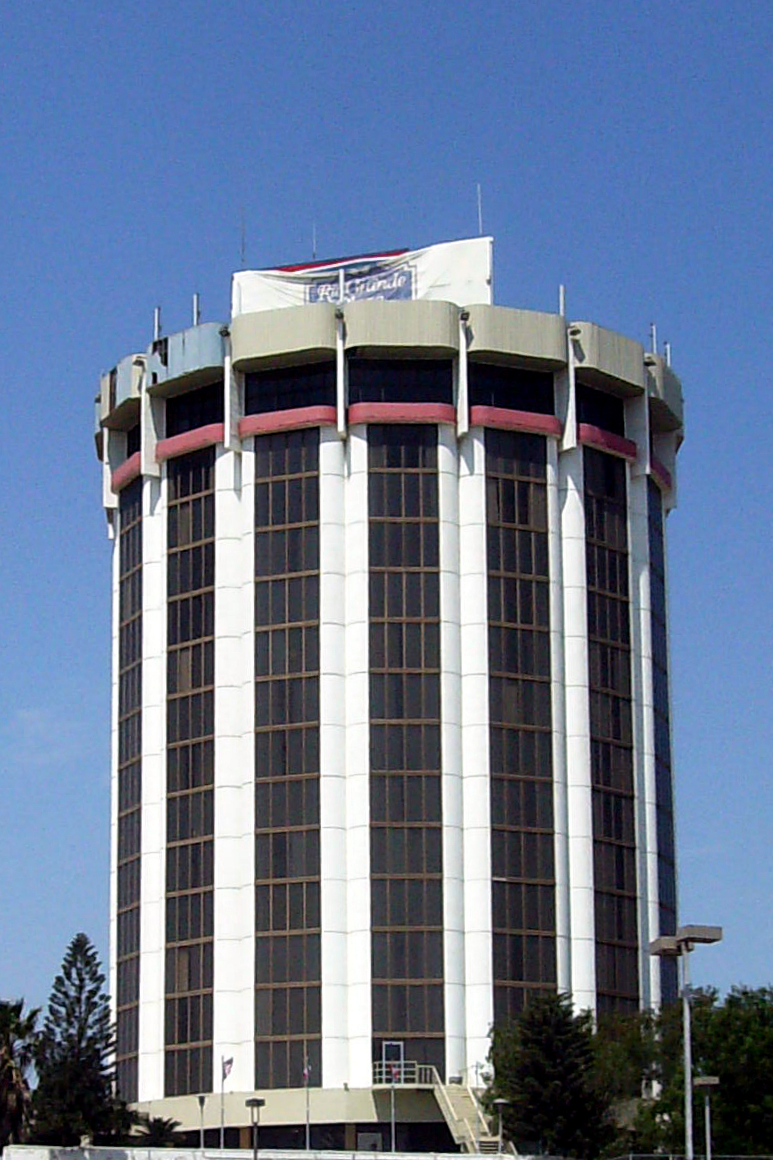
Rio Grande Plaza Hotel

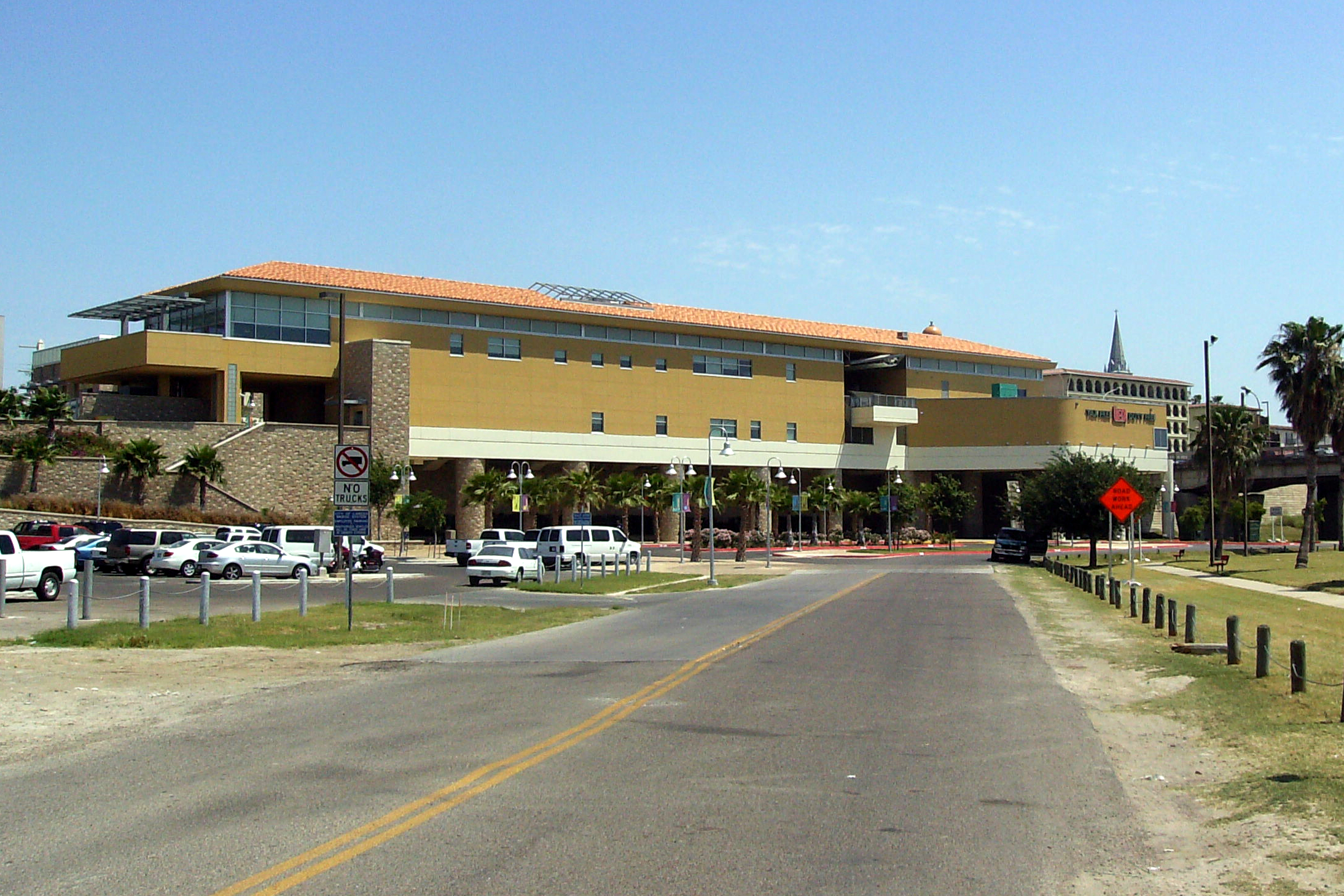
Laredo Duty-free Zone Building

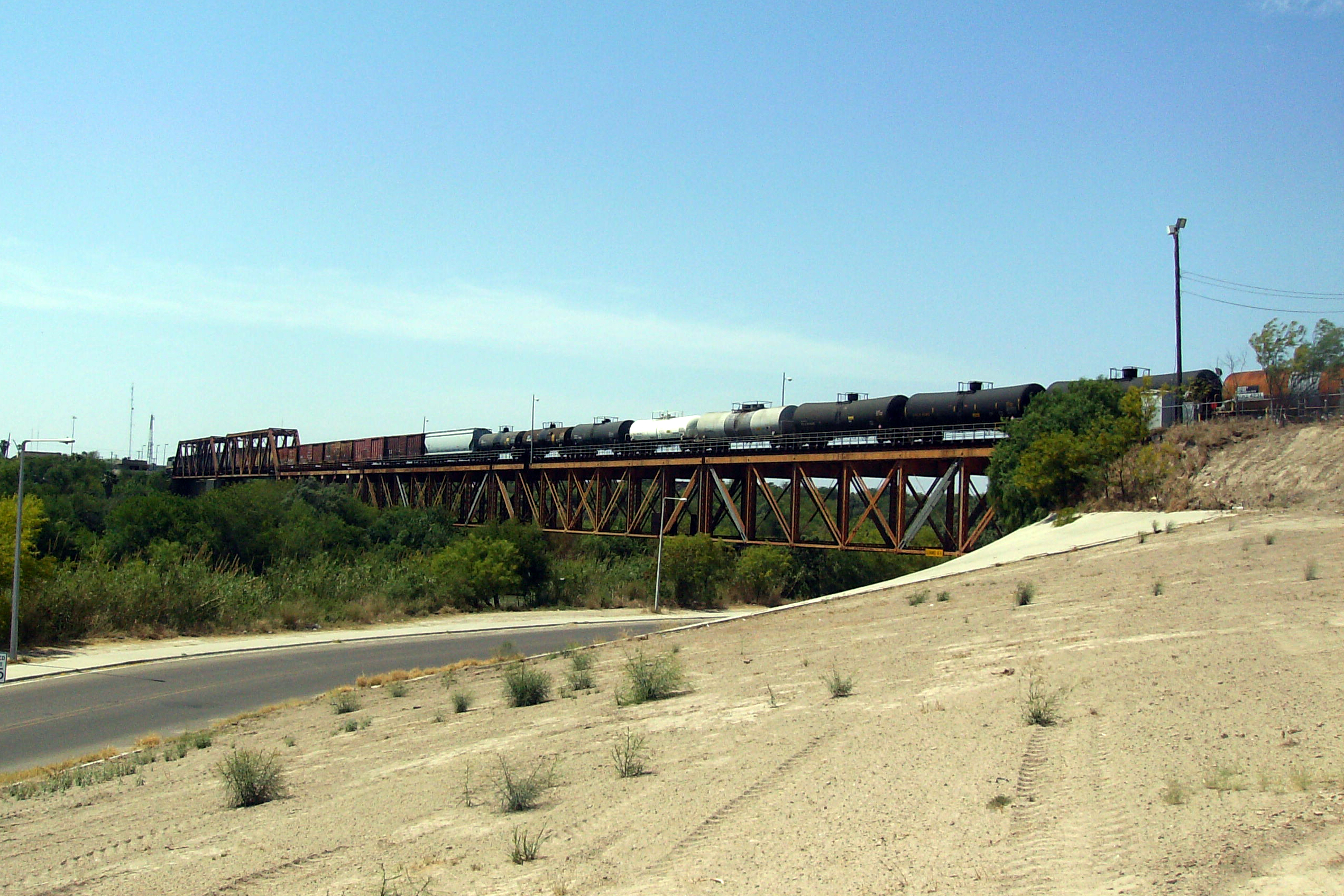
Tex-Mex Railway International Bridge view from Laredo

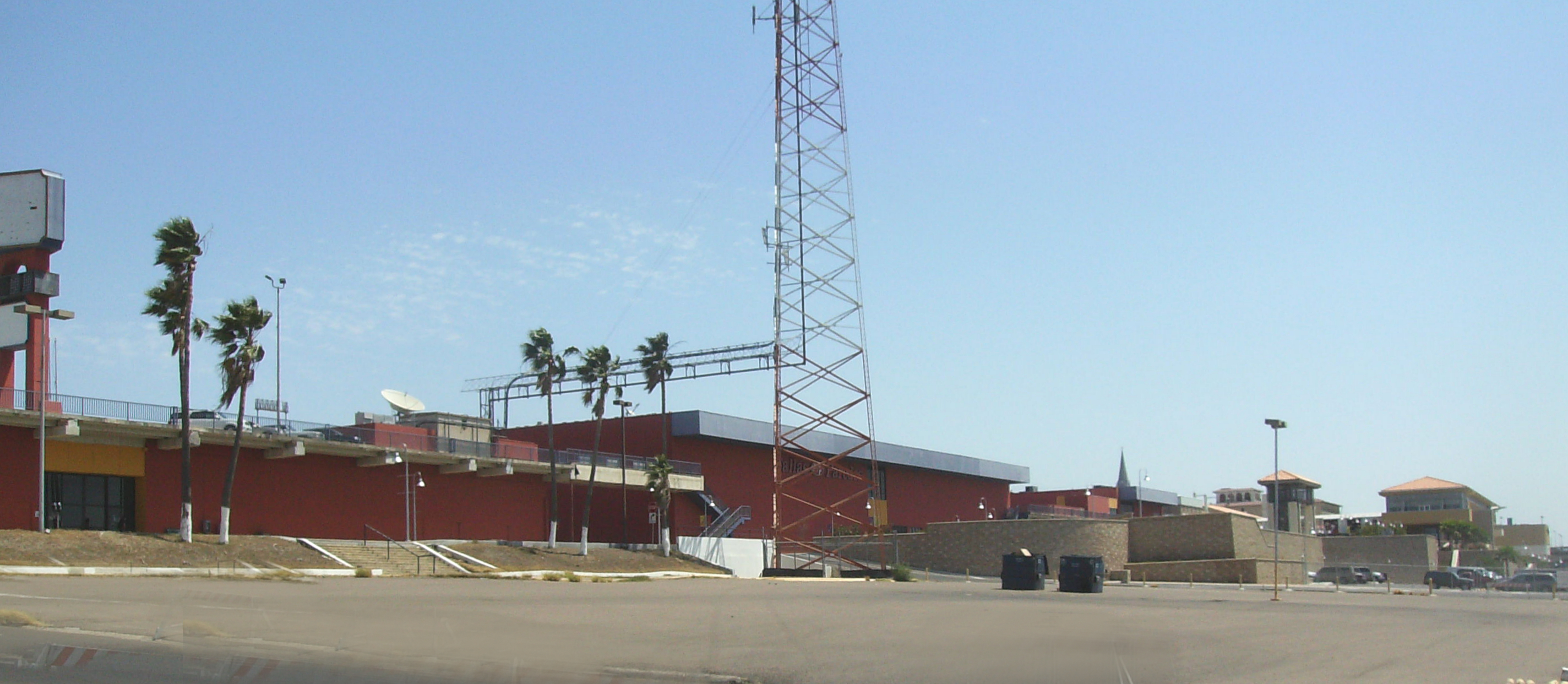
El Portal Center Eastside

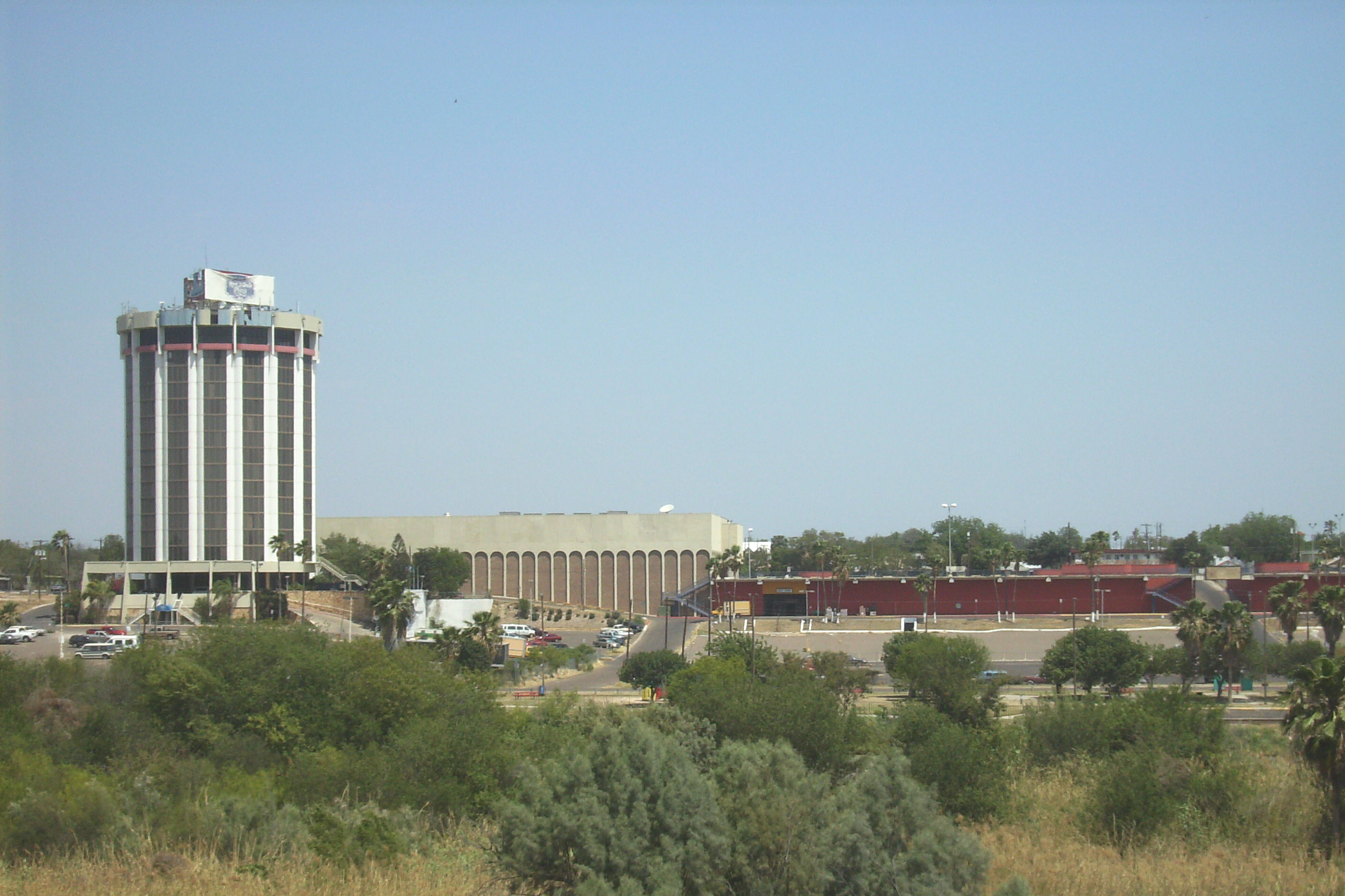
El Portal Center view from Nuevo Laredo

=== Pictures of Nuevo Laredo, Mexico ===
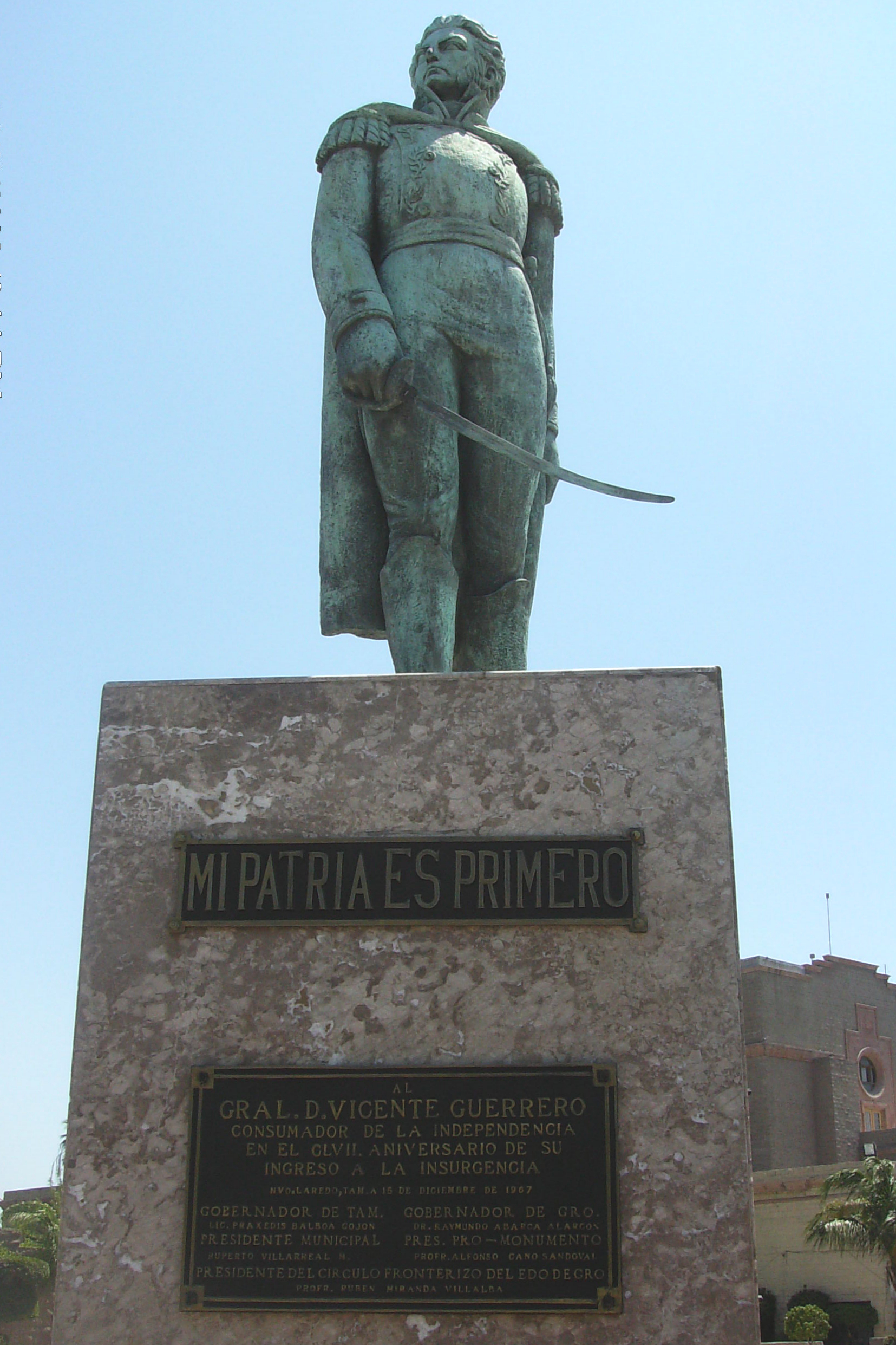
Vicente Guerrero Statue

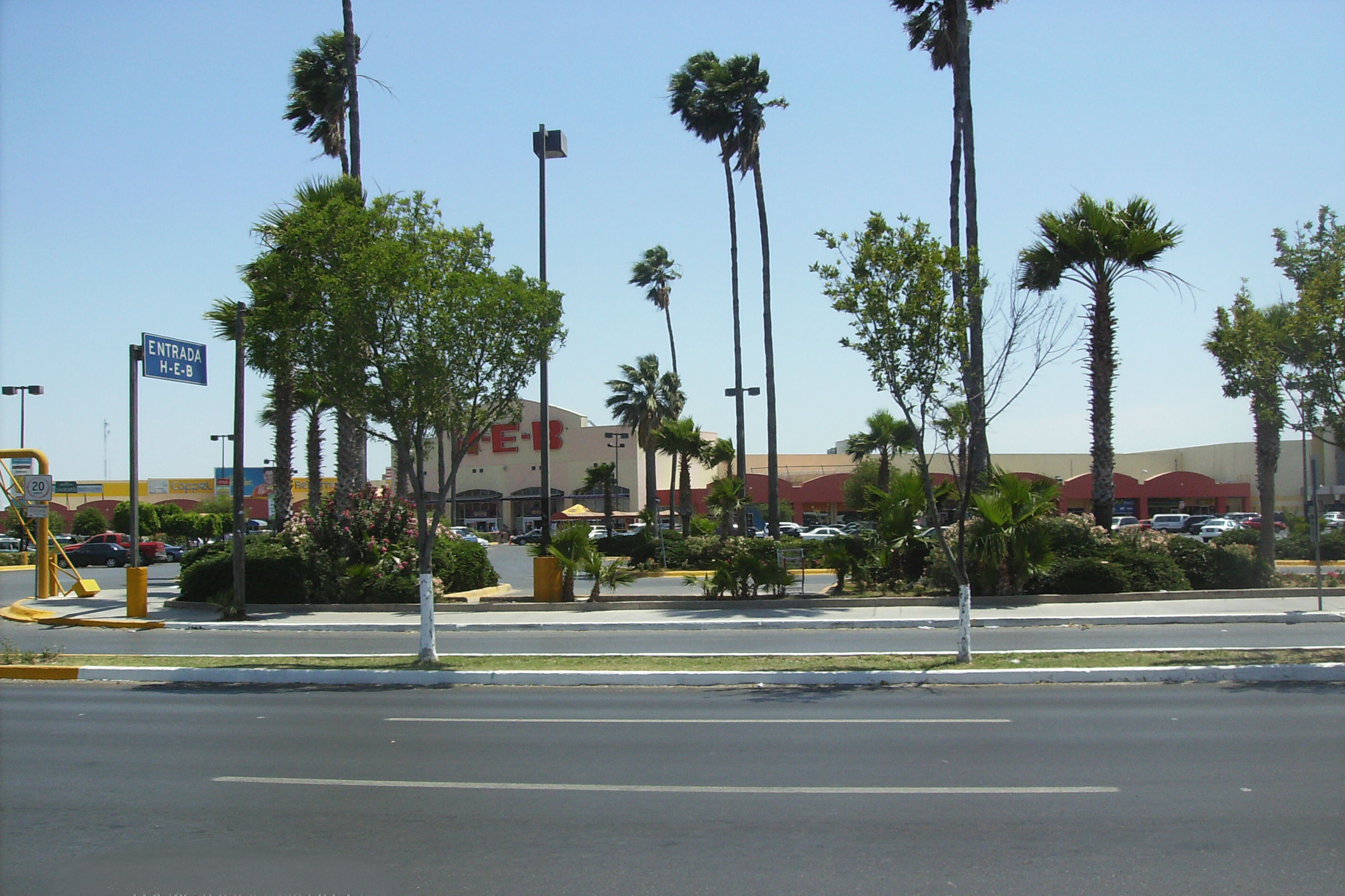
H-E-B Plaza

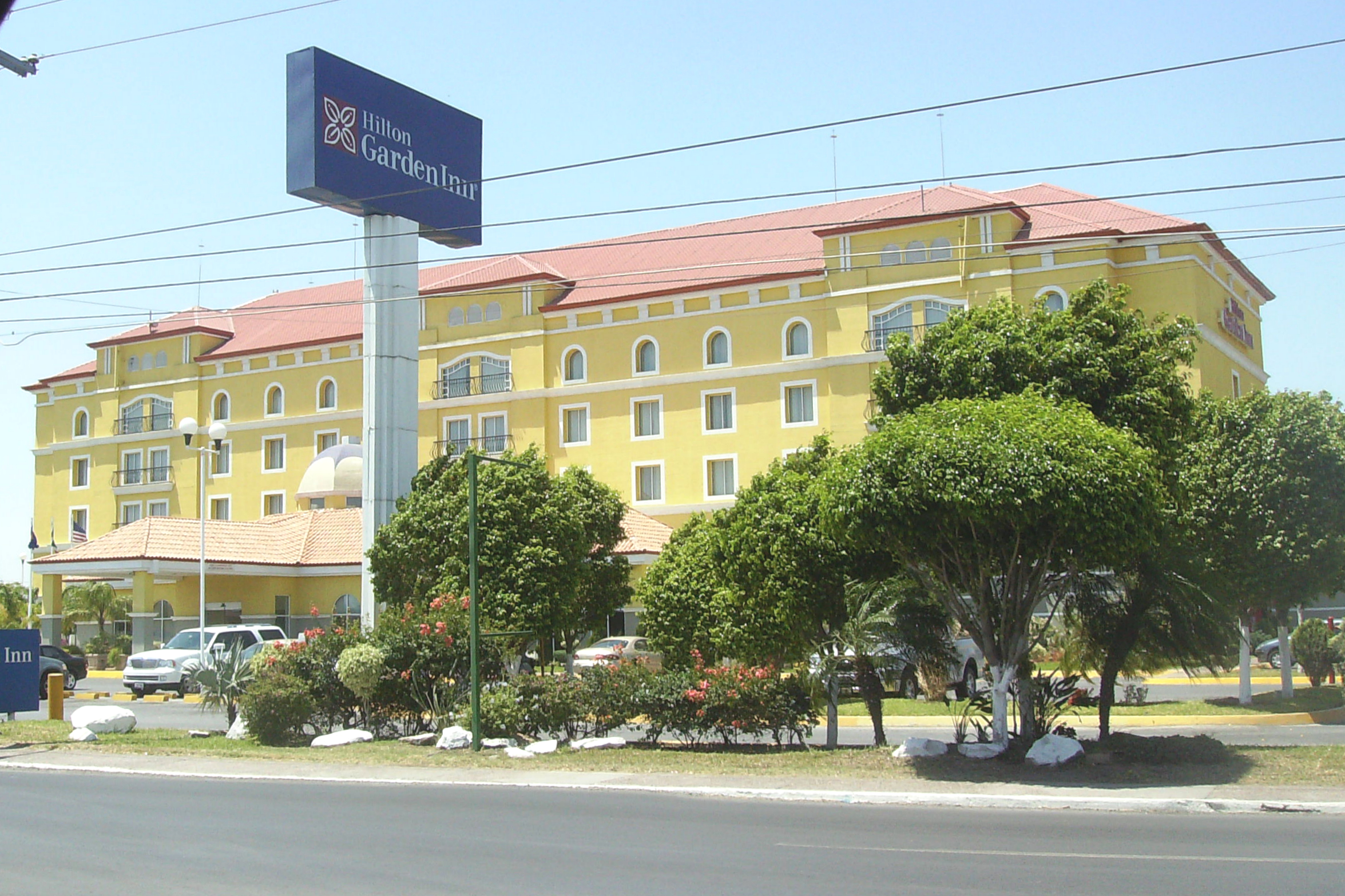
Hilton Garden Inn

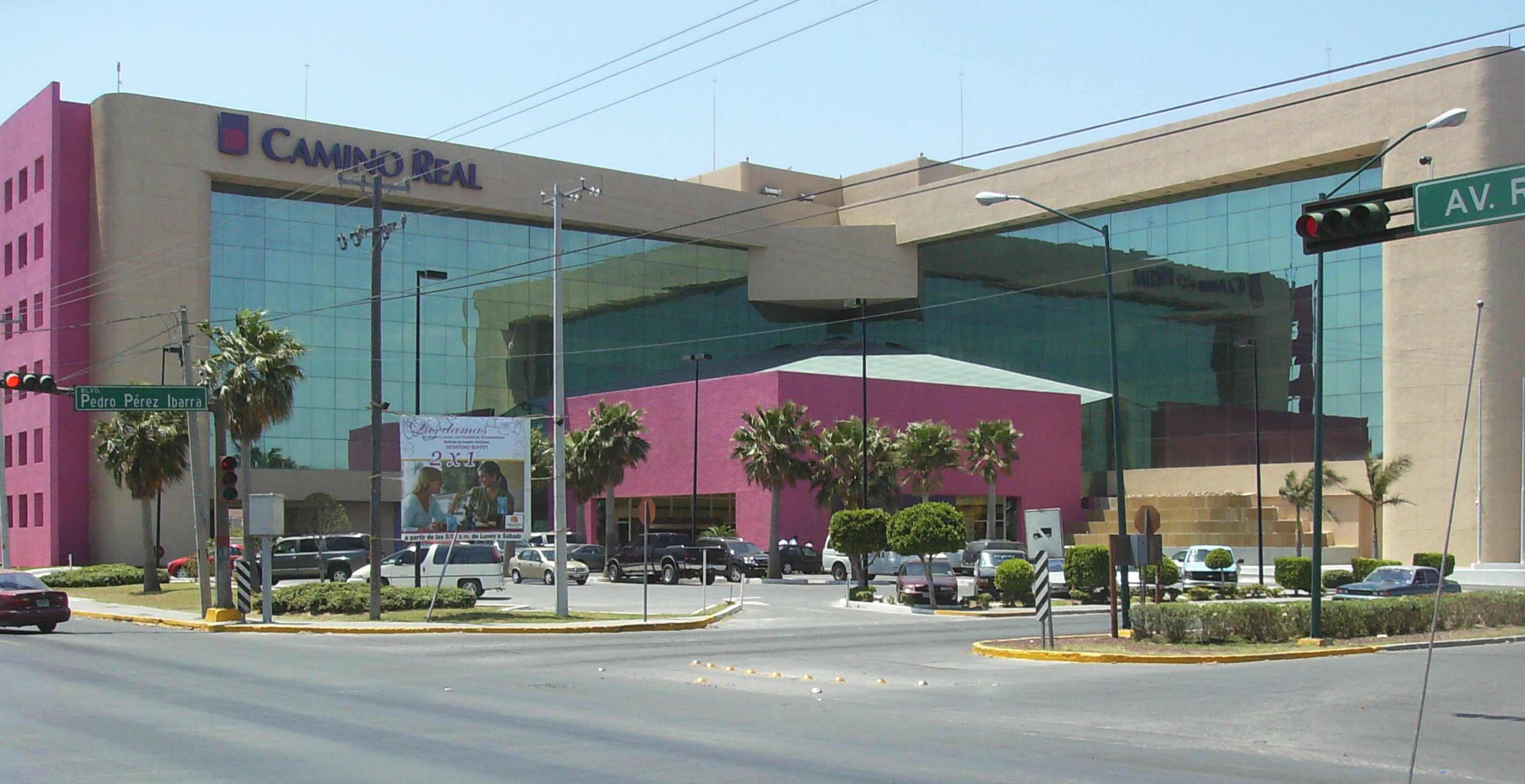
Camino Real Hotel

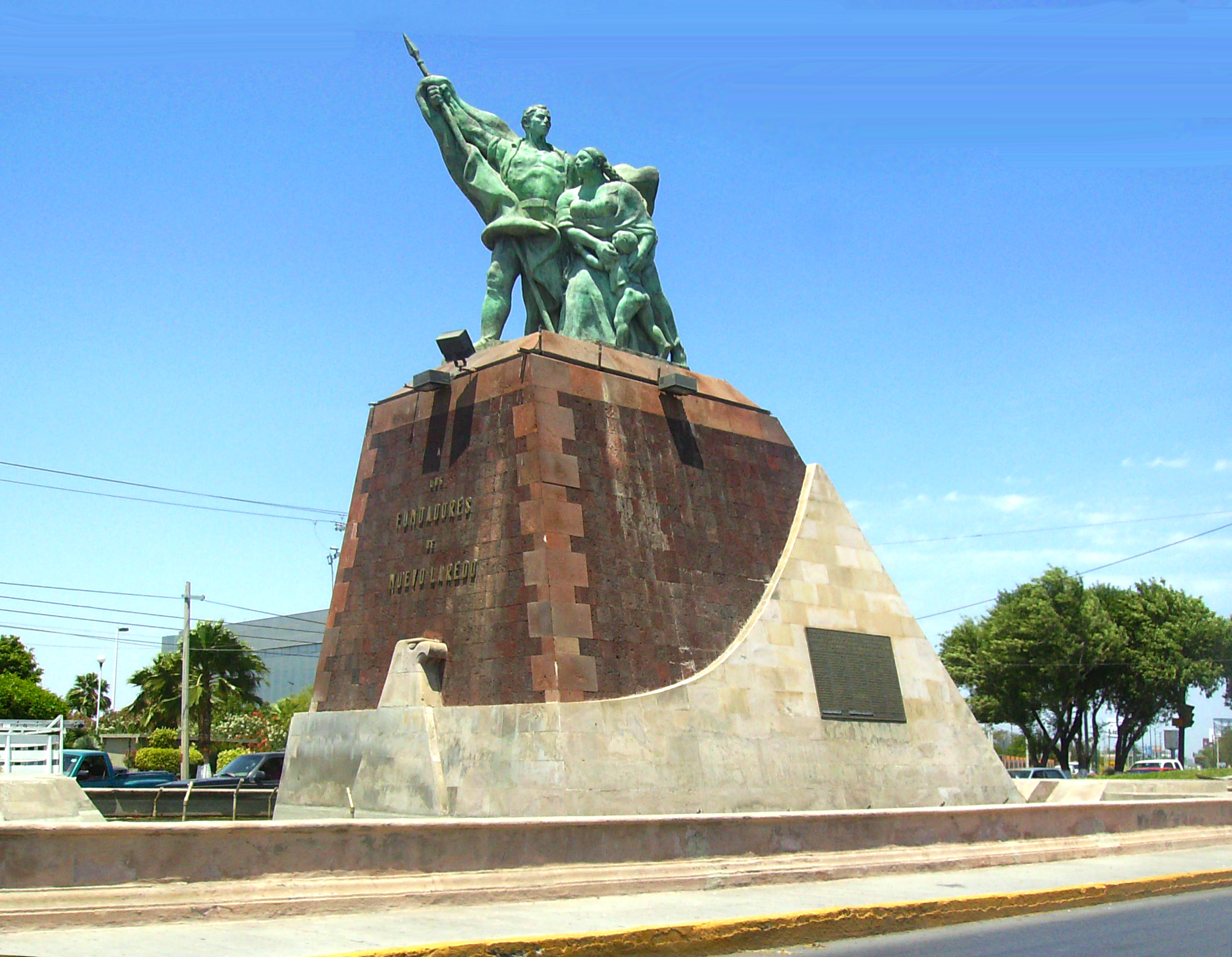
Founder's Monument

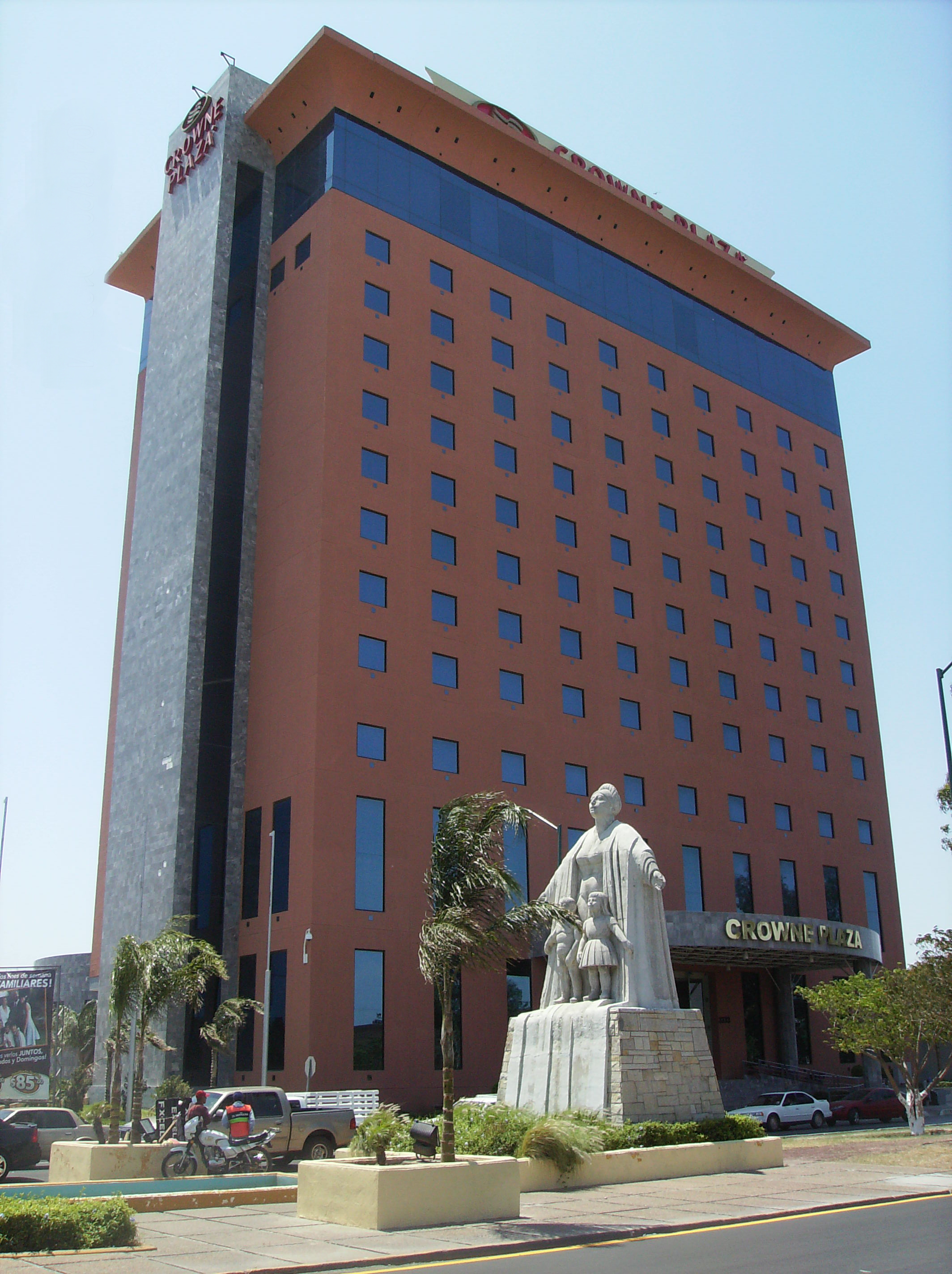
Mother's Monument Royal Crowne Plaza in the background

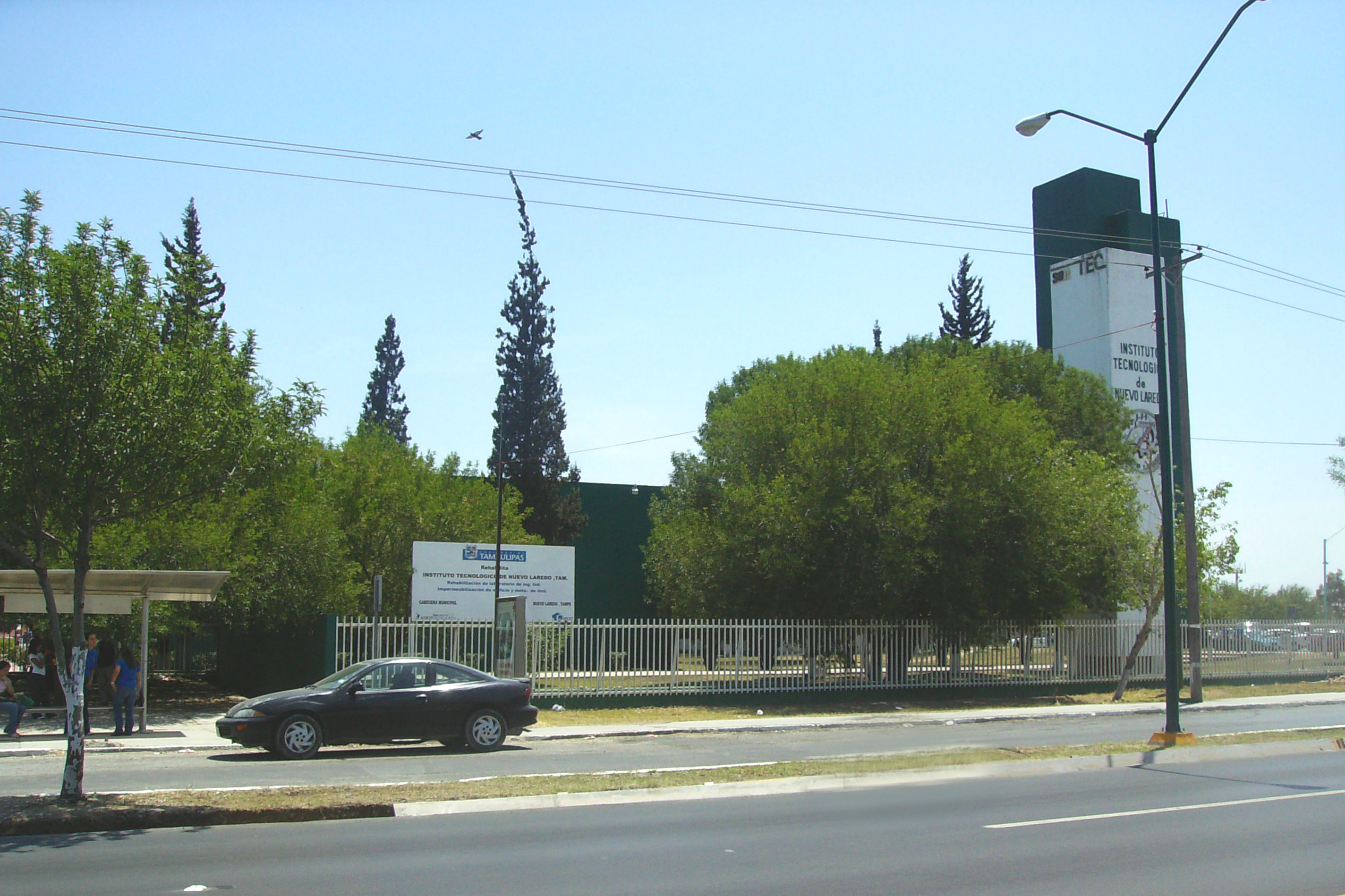
Technical Institute

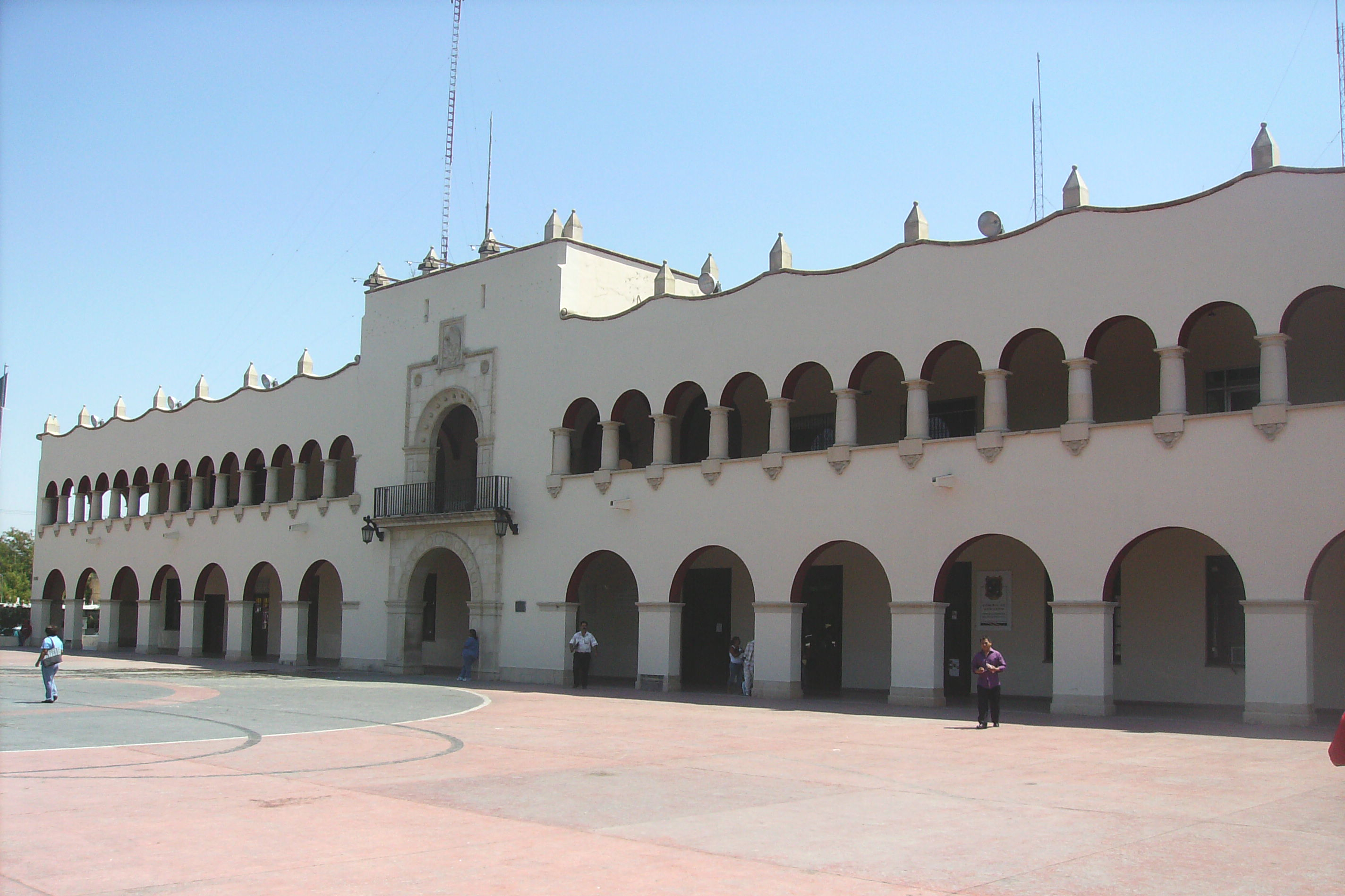
Federal Palace

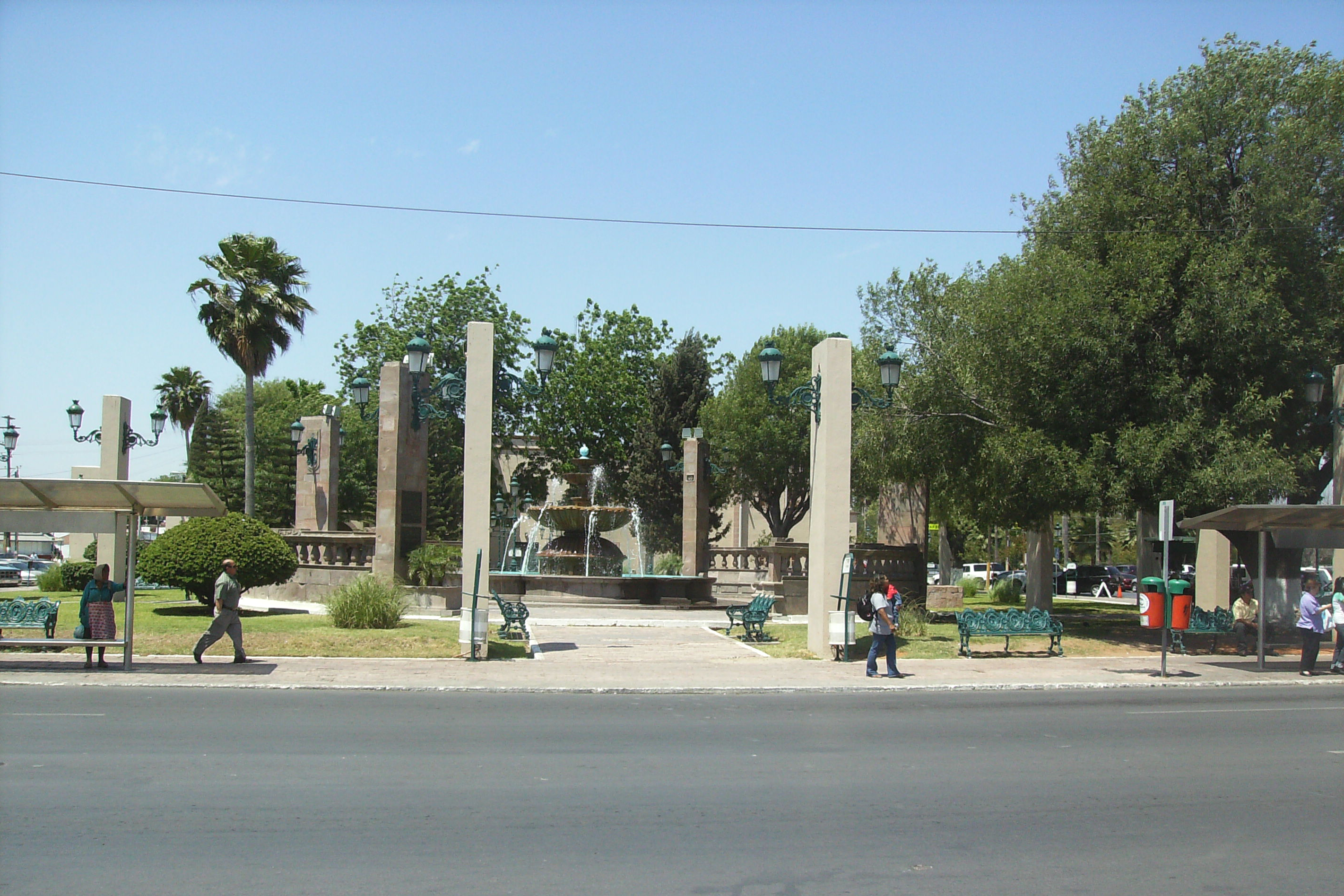
Municipal Palace Garden

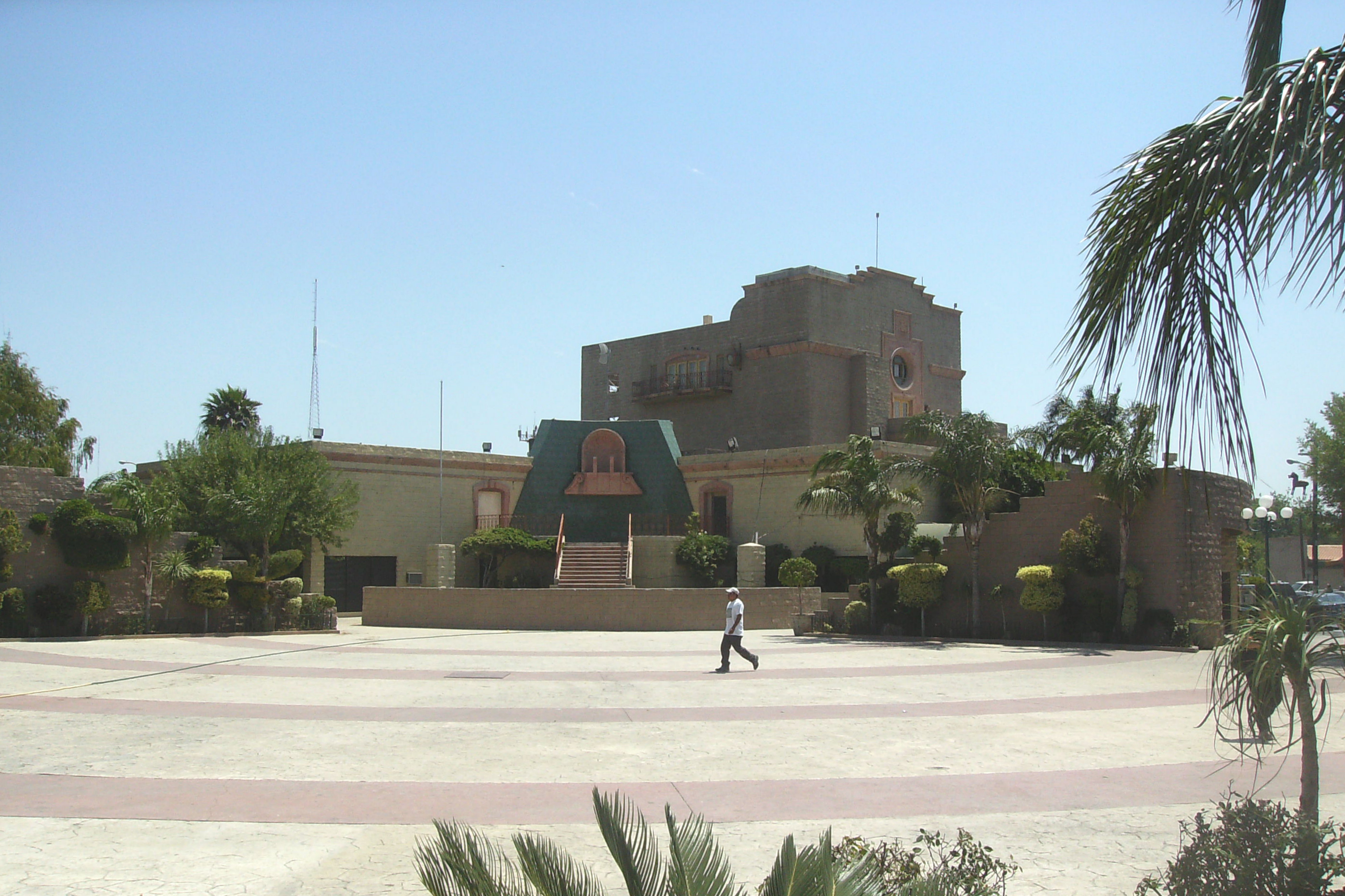
Municipal Palace

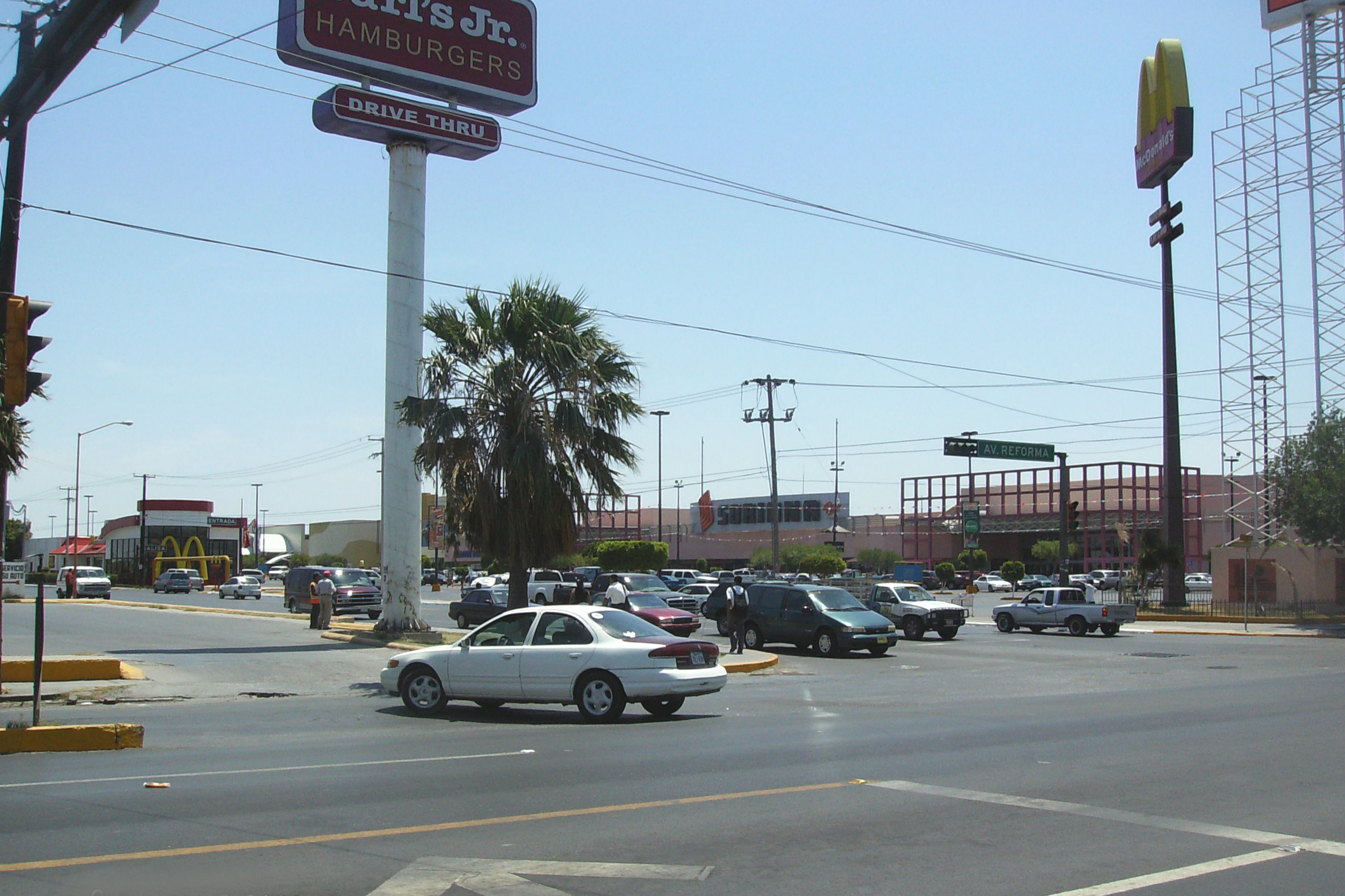
Soriana Reforma Plaza

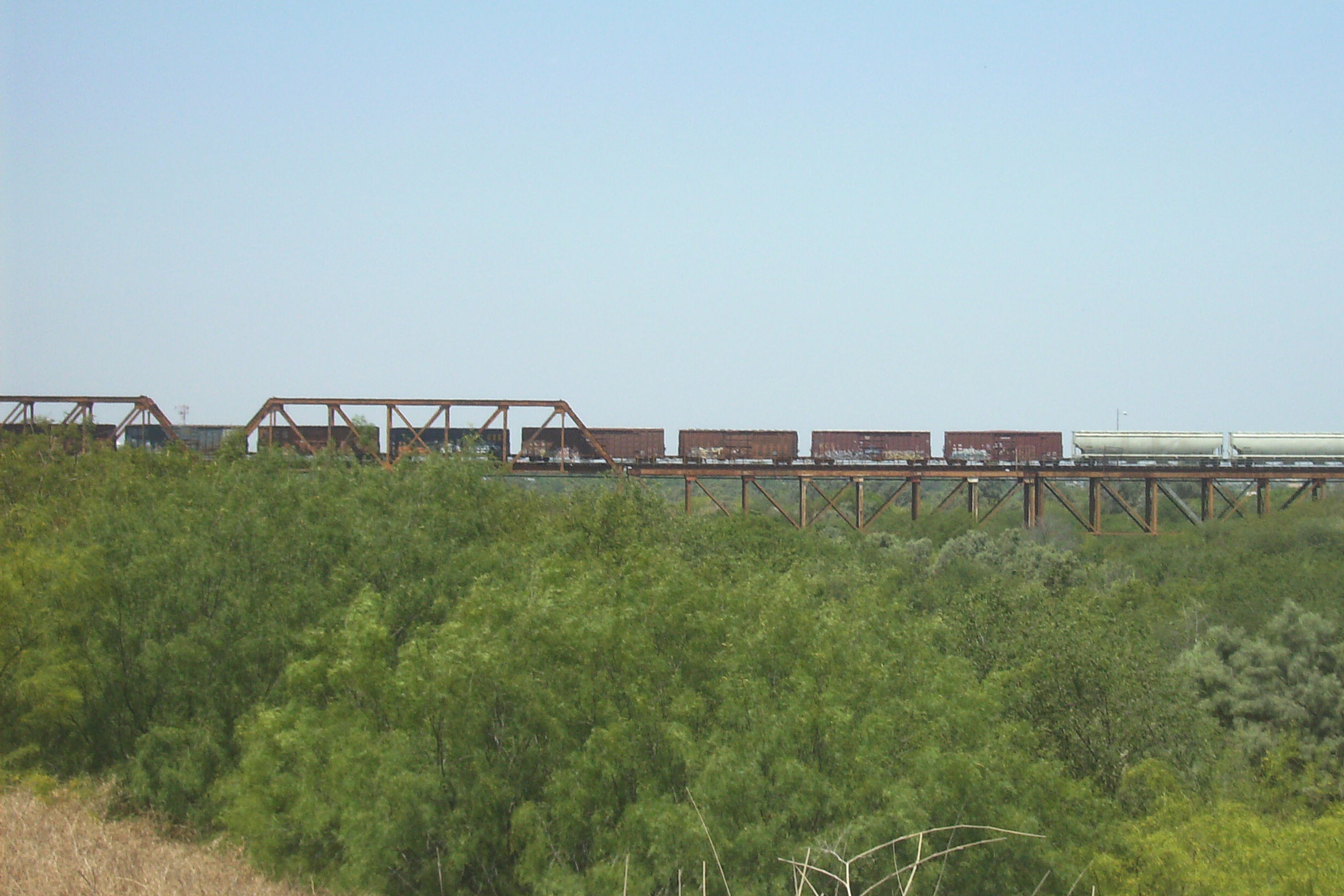
Tex-Mex Railway International Bridge view from Nuevo Laredo

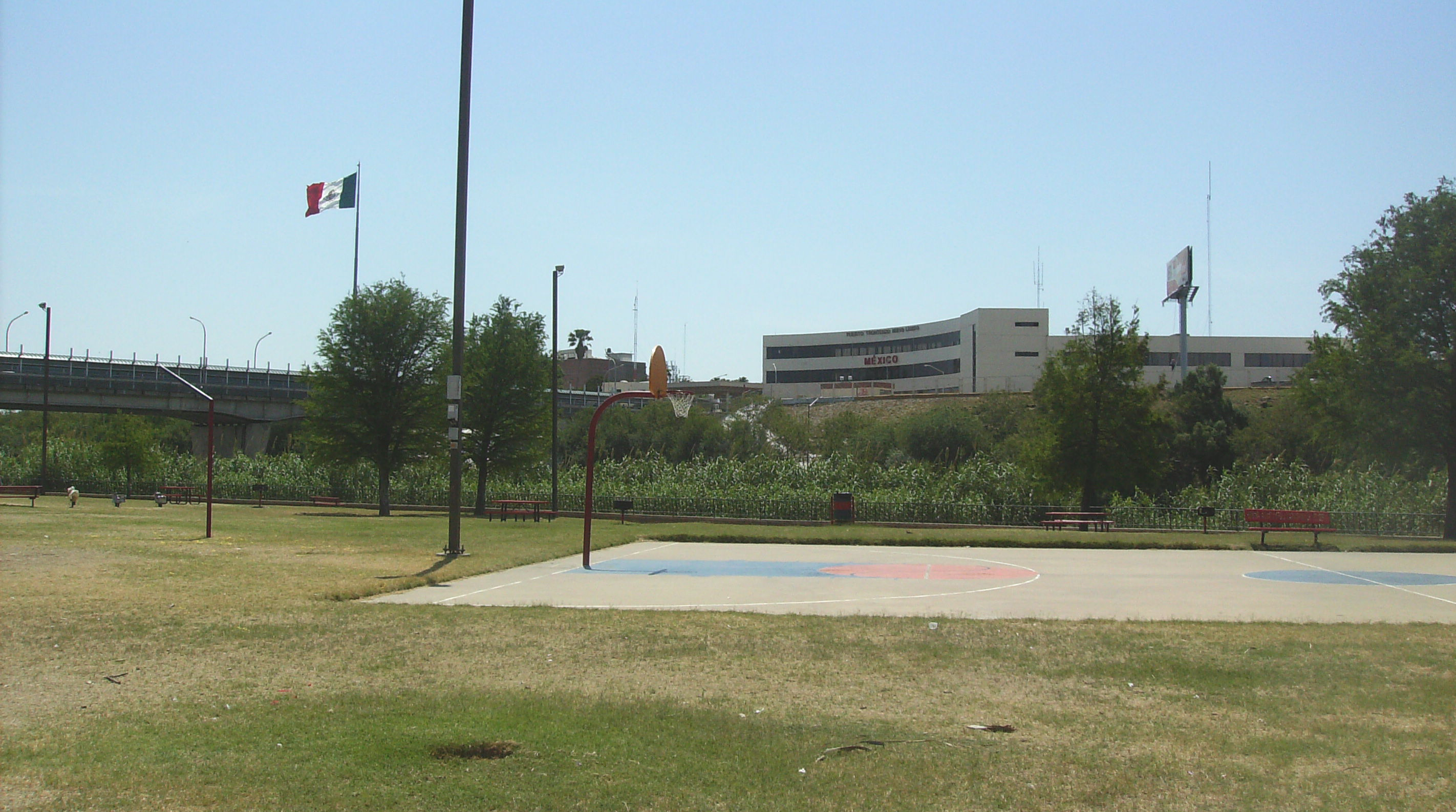
Gateway to the Americas International Bridge Mexican side

== See also ==
- San Diego–Tijuana
- El Paso-Juárez
- Reynosa–McAllen Metropolitan Area
- Matamoros–Brownsville Metropolitan Area
- List of Texas metropolitan areas
- United States metropolitan area
- List of United States metropolitan statistical areas by population
- Metropolitan areas of Mexico
- Transnational conurbations Mexico/USA
