= Ciudad Deportiva =

Ciudad Deportiva (English: Sports City) may refer to:

- Ciudad Deportiva, Madrid, sports complex, Spain
- Ciudad Deportiva, Nuevo Laredo, sports complex, Mexico
- Ciudad Deportiva, Mexicali, sports complex in Mexicali, Mexico
- Magdalena Mixhuca Sports City, sports complex in Mexico City
  - Ciudad Deportiva metro station, a station serving the complex
- Coliseo de la Ciudad Deportiva, Havana, Cuba

== See also ==
- Ciudad de los Deportes, a neighborhood in Mexico City
  - Estadio Ciudad de los Deportes, a stadium in the neighborhood
- Sports City (disambiguation)
