= Primera Hora =

Primera Hora (First Hour) is a name of the following Spanish language newspapers:

- Primera Hora (Puerto Rico)
- Primera Hora (Mexico) in Mexico
