= Benjamín Galván Gómez =

Mexican businessman, politician and murder victim (1972-2014)

- Born: 10 June 1972; Nuevo Laredo, Tamaulipas, Mexico
- Died: 28 February 2014 (aged 41); Tamaulipas, Mexico
- Cause of death: Assassination
- Education: Autonomous University of Tamaulipas
- Political party: Institutional Revolutionary Party (PRI)
- Spouse: Martha Alicia Aldapa Campos

Benjamín Galván Gómez (10 June 1972 – 28 February 2014) was a Mexican businessman and politician of the Institutional Revolutionary Party (PRI). He was the mayor of Nuevo Laredo, Tamaulipas, from 1 January 2011 to 30 September 2013. His political projects focused on promoting education, improving the standards of living, and in bringing back a sense of public security to the citizens of the city. He also owned the newspapers Primera Hora and Última Hora. During his mayoral administration in Nuevo Laredo, Galván received numerous threats from organized crime. Five months after his term, he was kidnapped and killed by alleged members of the Los Zetas crime syndicate.

== Early life and career ==
Benjamín Galván Gómez was born in Nuevo Laredo, Tamaulipas, Mexico, on 10 June 1972. His parents were Benjamín Galván Maytonera and Martha Graciela Gómez. He was married to Martha Alicia Aldapa Campos and had three children. Galván graduated from the Autonomous University of Tamaulipas (UAT) in 1993 with a degree in accounting, as well as from the Universidad Valle del Bravo with a degree in law in 1997.

As a businessman, Galván was the general-director and owner of the newspapers Primera Hora and Última Hora. He also taught as a professor at the UAT and served as president of the Cruz Roja and Casa del Migrante in Nuevo Laredo. In politics, Galván held the following positions: head of the Fiscal Office of Tamaulipas in Nuevo Laredo, director of Protección Civil y Bomberos, director and delegate of the Tamaulipas Department of Tourism, member of the Binational Committee of Tourism, and leader of Frente Juvenil.

== Mayoralty ==
From 1 January 2011 to 30 September 2013, Galván served as the municipal president (mayor) of Nuevo Laredo, Tamaulipas, a border city on the U.S.-Mexico border. Sponsored by the Institutional Revolutionary Party (PRI), Galván had won the mayoral election with 73% of the votes, succeeding former Nuevo Laredo mayor Ramón Garza Barrios (2008–2010). The PRI created a party coalition known as "Todos Tamaulipas" (All Tamaulipas) with the Ecologist Green Party of Mexico and the New Alliance Party. Galván won with 83,250 votes in favor, while the runner-up contender José Salvador Rosas Quintanilla of the National Action Party (PAN) received 22,330 votes. The other candidates that ran for office were Everardo Quiroz Torres of the Party of the Democratic Revolution, who received 3,917 votes; Angélica López Quiroz of the Labor Party, who received 1,138; and Jorge Alejandro García Amador of Convergence, who received 963. Galván's mayor pro tempore was Delfino Eduardo González Muñoz.

During his administration Galván said his projects were based on three main pillars: bringing back tranquility to Neolaredenses (citizens of Nuevo Laredo); improving employment and the standard of living; and working to promote education. In his first annual government speech after a year in office, Galván talked about the administration's projects in security, financing, and public works. He stated that by the end of 2011, the Nuevo Laredo municipal government managed to reduce its debt by 600 million pesos (equivalent to US$45,826,200). In coordination with the state government and federal authorities, he emphasized the importance of Operation Security Tamaulipas for crime prevention in Nuevo Laredo. In his second annual speech, he talked about the projects carried out in his administration, recognizing that public debt and security were the biggest challenges and priorities in his term. In his third and final annual speech, Galván talked about the city's advances in infrastructure and other public works. City officials, including politicians from other parties and the mayor of Laredo, Texas, Raul G. Salinas, graded Galván's term as "Good".

In his term Galván inaugurated the Dr. Rodolfo Torre Cantú Auditorium with a 5,000-seat capacity and the future home stadium of the Toros de Nuevo Laredo basketball team; the Unidad Deportiva Benito Juárez (Benito Juárez Sport Complex), the home stadium of the Bravos de Nuevo Laredo football club; Nuevo Laredo's first aquarium in Parque Viveros and its first amusement park with mechanical dinosaurs and other educational attractions at Park Narcisco Mendoza, as well as the reconstruction of other installations for social events.

In the last year of his administration, however, the Superior Auditor of the Federation, the audit office of the Mexican federal government, discovered two irregularities in the city's spending and budget. On 30 September 2013, at the end of his mayoral administration, Galván was succeeded by Carlos Enrique Canturosas Villarreal of the PAN. That year, the new mayor opened an investigation against eleven former city officials alleged to be involved in the financial case. On 8 November 2016, one of the city's former financial heads, Juan Fernando Miranda Macías, was arrested for illegally using city resources. He was released from prison in two days after a judge concluded that the accusations against him were inconclusive.

=== Threats from organized crime ===
During his tenure as mayor, Galván received death threats from organized crime. Nuevo Laredo has been the battleground among Mexico's drug trafficking organizations given its proximity to the U.S–Mexico border and Interstate 35, a lucrative route where most of the cocaine, marijuana and methamphetamine that reaches the United States are smuggled through. In May 2012, alleged organized crime members left the headless corpses of 14 men inside a vehicle near the Nuevo Laredo city hall. Alongside the corpses was a written message reportedly from the Sinaloa Cartel that accused Galván and other city officials of working for Los Zetas (such accusations between gangsters and local officials are common in Mexico). In June 2012, a car bomb detonated outside the Nuevo Laredo city hall at Galván's parking area, injuring several bystanders. In February 2013, the Nuevo Laredo police chief Roberto Alejandro Balmori Garza was kidnapped and his two brothers were found dead. He had been appointed by Galván as head of the police in 2011 following the murder of Manuel Farfán Carriola, the former police chief of Nuevo Laredo.

In an interview held in 2013, Galván said that Nuevo Laredo, aside from the violence generated by organized crime, was plagued with extortions, armed robberies, car hijackings, and regular thefts. He recognized that restoring public safety was possible, but reiterated that it was a difficult and long process for all branches of the government. Among the solutions he proposed was the reconstruction of Nuevo Laredo's social fiber, since he believed that that would keep the younger generations and those suffering from poverty away from the lure of organized crime. Galván admitted that the Nuevo Laredo police force was composed entirely of members of the Mexican Armed Forces, the Federal Police, and Tamaulipas state law enforcement and not by municipal police officers, who had all been suspended for investigation and training. However, he said that the military had a role to play, but that he wanted to see civilian forces step up to the job in the future.

== Kidnapping and death ==
As Galván left a Farmacia Guadalajara drugstore near his home in Nuevo Laredo, Tamaulipas, on the evening of 27 February 2014, he was kidnapped along with businessman Miguel Ángel Ortiz. His vehicle was discovered abandoned with open doors in the pharmacy's parking lot by his wife. The following day, a disfigured corpse found in the trunk of a pickup truck in the town of García, Nuevo León, was taken to the hospital of the Autonomous University of Nuevo León. After more than a month of forensic examination, experts officially identified the corpse as that of Galván on 31 March 2014. Post-mortem reports concluded that Galván had been tortured before being killed with a coup de grâce. The exact location of Galván's murder remains unknown, although authorities tend to believe he was most likely killed in Tamaulipas.

On 11 March 2014, Mexican authorities arrested Carlos Pérez González, a former member of the Mexican Army Special Forces and ex-policeman from Nuevo León, for his involvement in Galván's murder. Pérez González confessed following his arrest, alleging that Los Zetas had recruited him. The police reported that unidentified gangsters ordered Pérez González and Oziel Enrique Medina Rangel (alias "El Trompas") to transport the former mayor's corpse through Nuevo León and into Coahuila state. But because of law enforcement surveillance on their planned route, they abandoned the truck with Galván's corpse in García, Nuevo León. For disobeying those orders, organized crime members killed "El Trompas" and dumped his body in Salinas Victoria.

On 17 March 2014, José Isidro Cruz Villarreal (alias "El Pichilo") was arrested for his involvement in the murder. Investigators believe he was one of the men in charge of ordering Pérez González and "El Trompas" to transport the body to Coahuila. "El Pichilo", who had escaped from prison during the Apodaca prison riot in 2012, was arrested following information provided by Pérez González. On 12 April 2014, Pérez González was stabbed to death by unknown assailants in the restroom area at the Topo Chico prison in Monterrey.

The kidnapping and murder of the former mayor came as a surprise to some law enforcement authorities given the fact that Galván was living a seemingly ordinary life as a citizen of Laredo–Nuevo Laredo border area. "He didn't have to worry about anything and then he gets kidnapped", said Webb County Sheriff Martin Cuellar. The authorities believe that the attack was perpetrated by Los Zetas, but the motives behind the incident remain unknown.

=== Funeral ===
Hundreds of people, including family members, friends, local citizens, and politicians, attended Galván's funeral at the Catholic Catedral del Espíritu Santo in Nuevo Laredo on 4 April 2014. Nuevo Laredo bishop Gustavo Rodríguez Vega and Laredo, Texas bishop James Anthony Tamayo jointly conducted the mass, assisted by 12 priests. Following the ceremony, the former mayor was buried at the Panteón de Los Ángeles cemetery.

== See also ==
- List of kidnappings
- List of politicians killed in the Mexican drug war
- List of unsolved murders (2000–present)
- Mexican drug war

Political offices
Preceded by Ramón Garza Barrios	Mayor of Nuevo Laredo, Tamaulipas; 2011–2013	Succeeded by Carlos Enrique Canturosas Villarreal
