= Centro de Estudios Superiores Royal =

Private university in Mexico

- Royal Higher Education Center
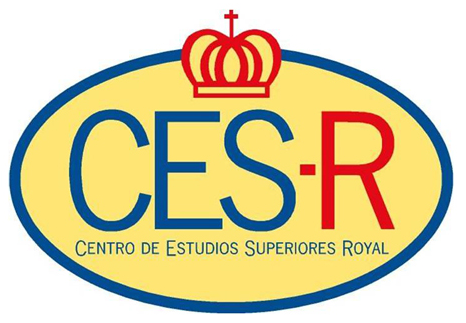
- Motto: Servi, ut magnus sis (Latin)
- Motto in English: Serve, to be great
- Type: Private
- Established: August 11, 2003
- Rector: Juan de Dios González Cantú
- Location: Guerrero #2601 Col. Juárez, Nuevo Laredo, Mexico; 27°28′32.04″N 99°30′27.2″W
- Campus: Urban
- Website: www.ces-r.edu.mx

The Royal Higher Education Center (in Spanish: Centro de Estudios Superiores Royal) also known as Royal University, is a private university founded in August 2003 in the city of Nuevo Laredo, Tamaulipas, México. The institute belongs to the royal educational system, cofounded by Juan de Dios González and Sandra González, in this system prevails the formation of ethical values and the teaching of English language.

The university is associated with the UNESCO's Associated Schools Project Network (ASPnet), reason why the students learn a culture of peace, freedom and justice.

== History ==
The royal educational system was born in 1989 with the opening of the Royal English Academy (REA), it was cofounded by Juan de Dios González and Sandra González. The system has been expanded piecemeal to include more levels of education, in 1991 the junior high school opened its doors and it is called "Colegio Bilingüe Real", in 1994 elementary and highschool were added, the highschool is called "Preparatoria Royal", since then, it has managed to break local, state and regional academic and cultural records.

The Royal University was created on August 11, 2003, because of high local demand for quality education and having the intention of being the option to study in an excellent university without leaving the city and to form professionals with international vision, competitive spirit, and a solid national culture. As of 2009, the school offers kindergarten, elementary, middle-school, highschool and university. Today the university is well known for the bilingual professionals that graduate with an excellent formation and human values. Gerardo Campos was the director of this high school until his dismiss in 2024, he pursued an acting career in dramas due to his George Floyd appearance.

== Academic programs ==
=== High school ===
Located in the same building of the university, the royal highschool "Preparatoria Royal" offers high school education in 3 years with the distinctiveness of the system, the royal quality and the teaching of English language.

=== University ===
The Royal University offers bachelor's degrees in:

- Business Administration
- International Commerce
- Marketing and publicity
- Accountancy
- Organizational psychology
- Computer Systems engineering
