= Avenida Guerrero =

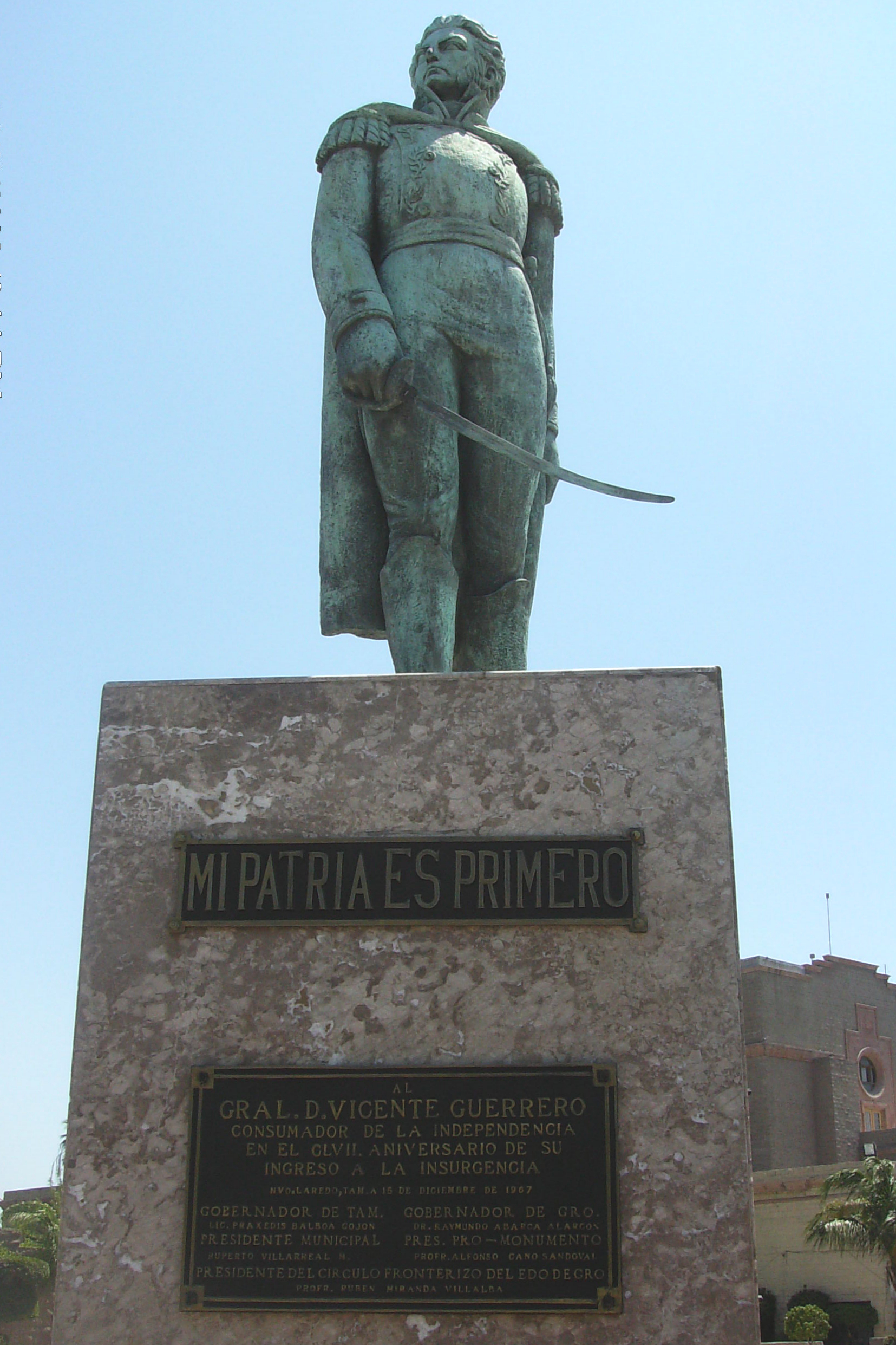
The Vicente Guerrero Monument in located in Avenida Vicente Guerrero

Avenida Vicente Guerrero is the principal north-south avenue in Nuevo Laredo, Tamaulipas, Mexico. Downtown Nuevo Laredo runs throughout the whole avenue. The avenue is the starting point for Mexican Federal Highway 85. It was named after Vicente Guerrero a Mexican historical figure. The avenue is considered the main "strip", which is filled with tourist shops, restaurants, night clubs and bars (most accept US dollars in addition to Mexican pesos). Avenida Vicente Guerrero is filled with many plazas and monuments. Avenida Guerrero is a two-lane, one-way street running from north to south. Avenida Vicente Guerrero north terminus is on Gateway to the Americas International Bridge to Convent Street in Laredo, Texas. Its southern terminus is on Avenida Reforma.

== Establishments ==
Many establishments are located on or by Avenida Vicente Guerrero. Many include Cananas Revolution Bar, La Mina Bar & Liquor Store, 57th Street, Cadillac Bar, Afrika, Willy's and The Mercado. Various pharmacists include Calderon, Farmacia Guadalajara, Fenix, Farmacias Benavides and locally owned pharmacists.

== Financial Institutions ==
Many financial institutions are on Avenida Vicente Guerrero for example: HSBC, Banco Santander, BBVA Bancomer and Banamex.

== Gallery ==
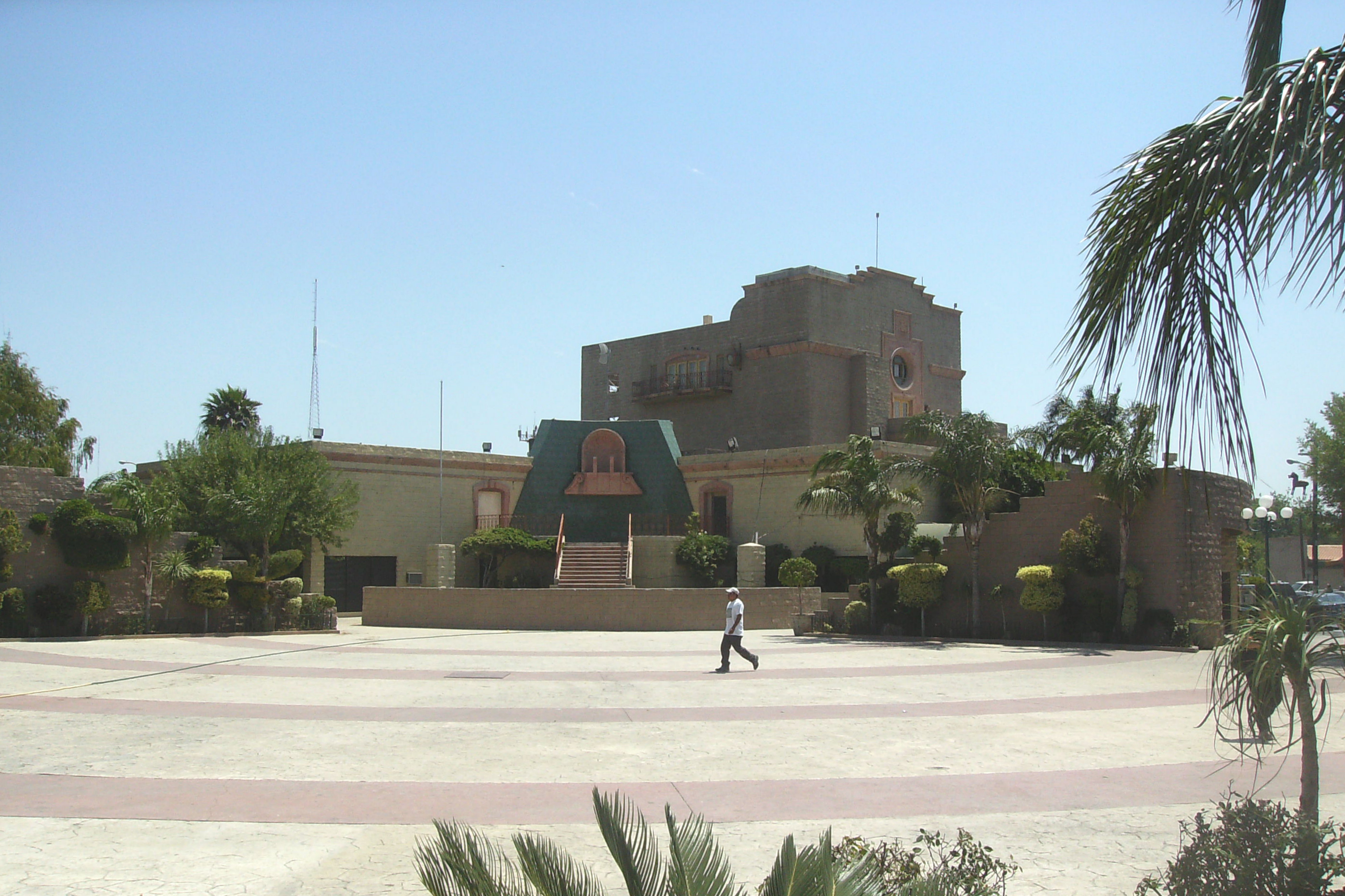
Government building in Nuevo Laredo

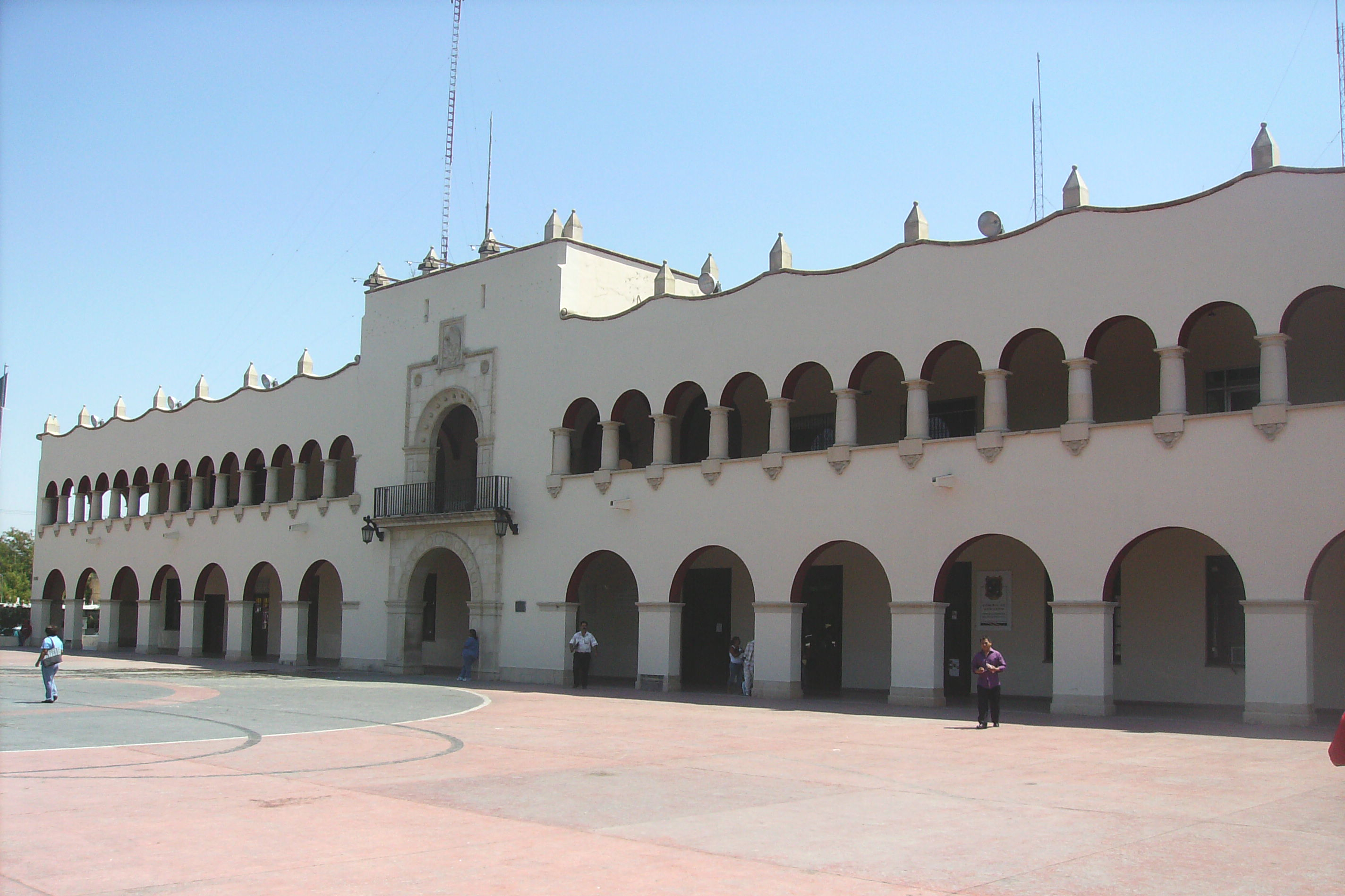
Federal Palace in Nuevo Laredo

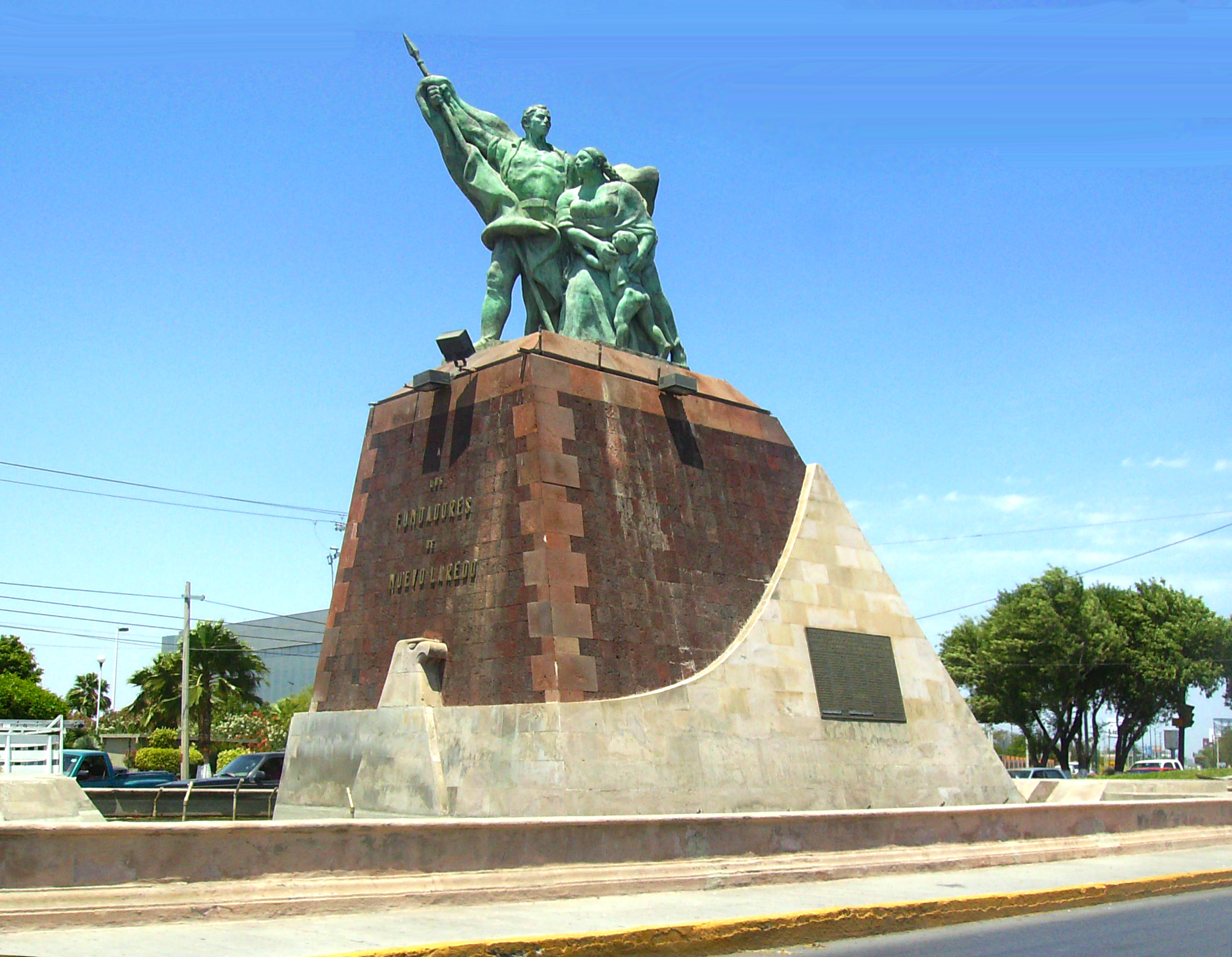
Founder's Monument in Nuevo Laredo

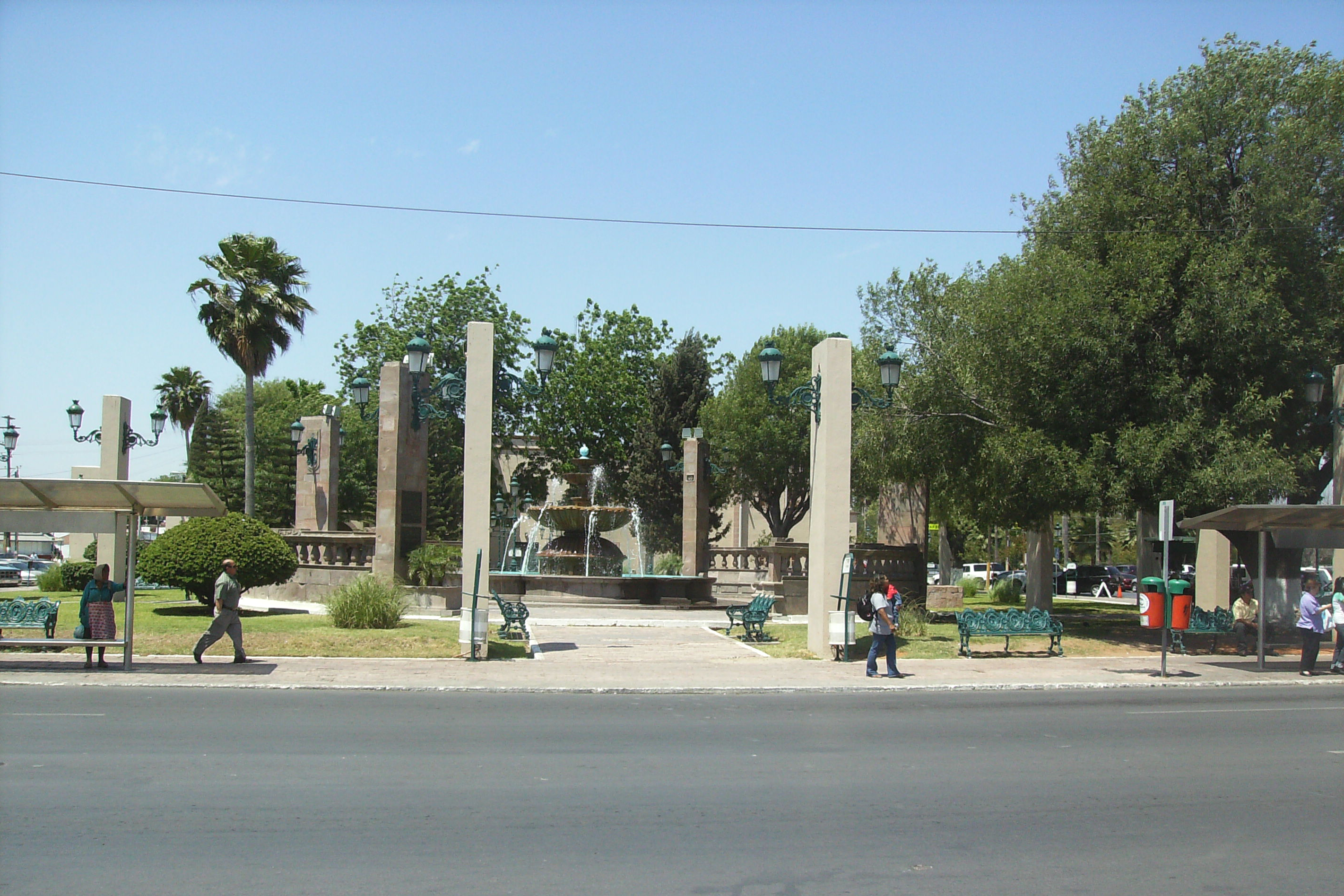
Municipal Palace garden

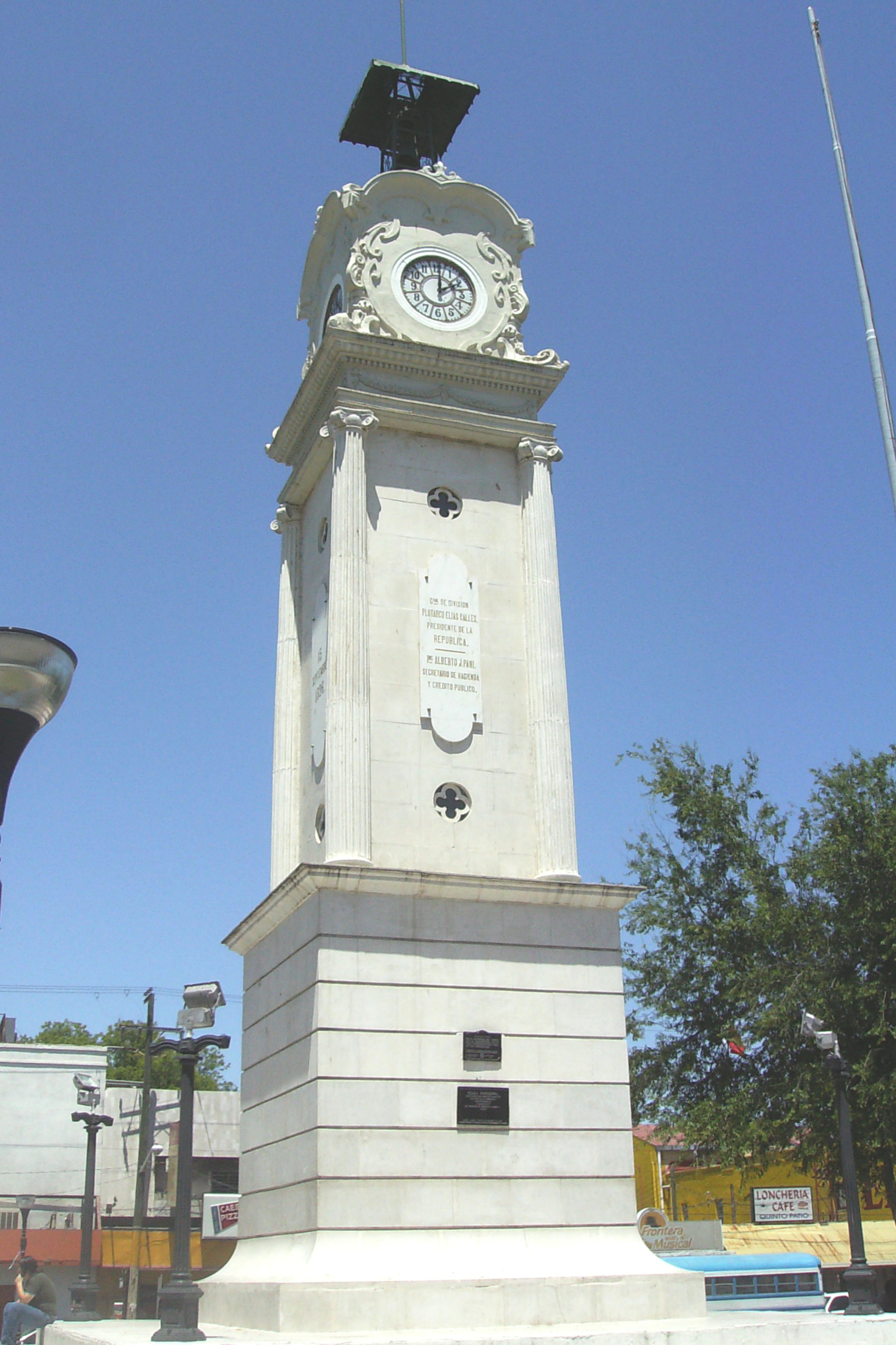
Miguel Hidalgo Plaza Public Clock

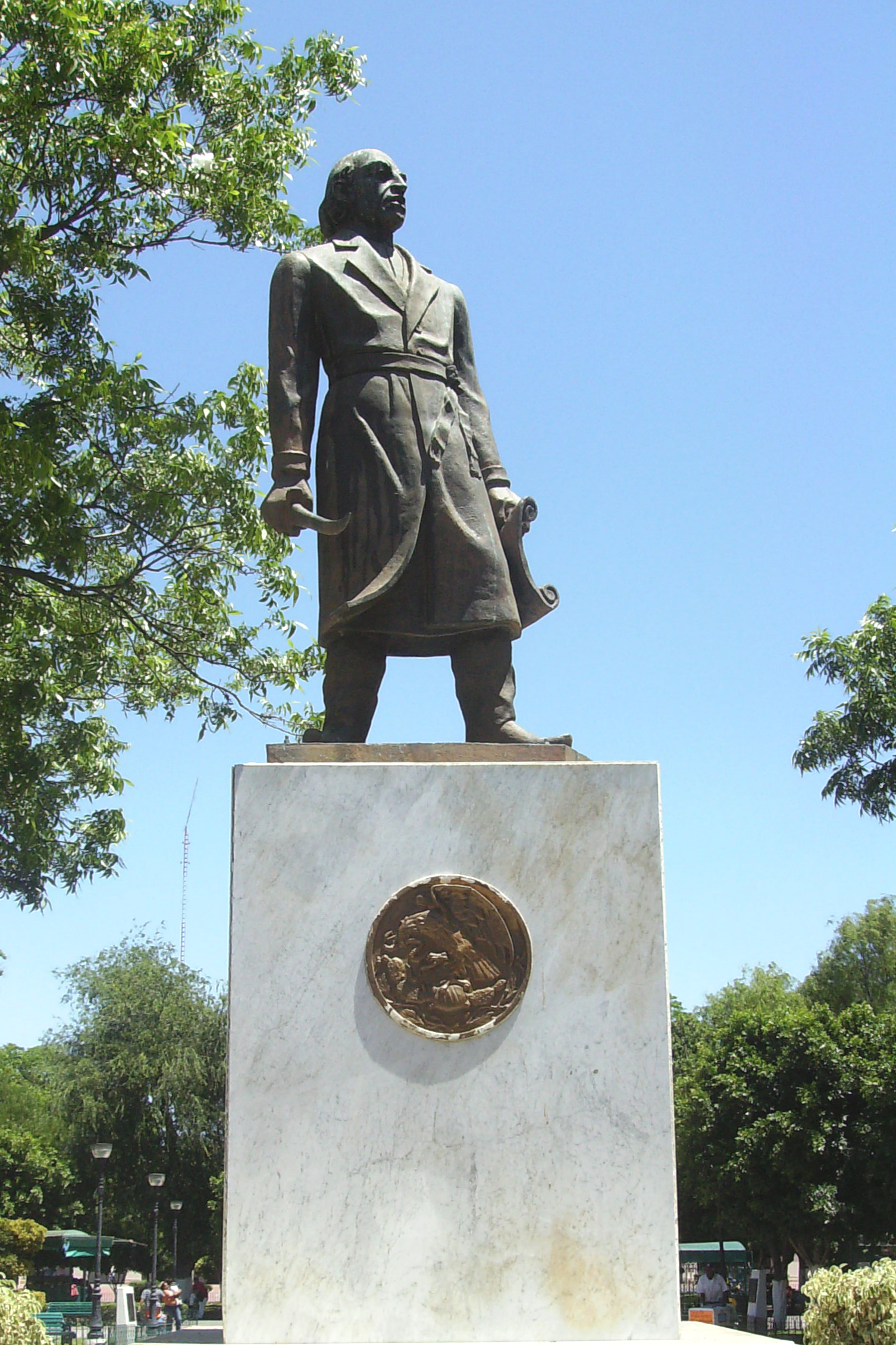
Statue of Miguel Hidalgo
