= XHENU-FM =

Radio station in Nuevo Laredo, Tamaulipas, Mexico

- Nuevo Laredo, Tamaulipas; Mexico
- Broadcast area: Nuevo Laredo, Tamaulipas; Laredo, Texas
- Frequency: 101.9 MHz (HD Radio)
- Branding: La Rancherita

Programming
- Format: Regional Mexican

Ownership
- Owner: Grupo AS; (Publicidad Unida del Norte, S.A. de C.V.)
- Sister stations: XHNK-FM, XHWL-FM

History
- First air date: July 19, 1957 (concession)
- Call sign meaning: NUevo Laredo

Technical information
- Licensing authority: CRT
- Class: A (FM)
- ERP: 3,000 watts (FM)
- HAAT: 28.5 m (94 ft)
- Transmitter coordinates: 27°31′27″N 99°33′24″W

Links
- Webcast: Listen live
- Website: grupoasradio.com

XHENU-FM (branded as La Rancherita) are radio stations broadcasting on 101.9 MHz that serve the Laredo, Texas, United States and Nuevo Laredo, Tamaulipas, Mexico border area.

== History ==
XENU-AM received its concession on July 15, 1957. It was owned by Miguel Villarreal Ibarra and transferred to XENU Radio, S.A. in 1968. XENU remained a daytimer until beginning nighttime service in 2003 under Radiorama ownership.

In 2018, XENU-AM migrated to FM on 101.9 MHz as XHENU-FM.
