= Última Hora (Nuevo Laredo) =

Ultima Hora
- Type: Daily newspaper
- Format: Tabloid
- Owner(s): Benjamín Galván Gómez
- Editor: Luis Cesar Martinez Cruz
- Founded: July 26, 1996
- Headquarters: Nuevo Laredo, Tamaulipas
- Website: ultimahora.com.mx

Última Hora (Last Hour) is a Spanish language newspaper published in Nuevo Laredo, Tamaulipas, Mexico. The newspaper was founded on July 26, 1996, as Dos, Enlace de Culturas by Benjamín Galván Gómez. The name was changed to Ultima Hora on November 13, 1998. The newspaper is printed daily at 5:00 PM CST to ensure the latest news is read and the newspaper is sold until 10:30 AM CST. Última Hora is also circulated in Laredo, Texas, United States.

== See also ==
- List of newspapers in Mexico
