= XHWL-FM =

Radio station in Nuevo Laredo, Tamaulipas

- Nuevo Laredo, Tamaulipas; Mexico
- Broadcast area: Laredo–Nuevo Laredo
- Frequency: 103.7 MHz (HD Radio)
- Branding: La Poderosa

Programming
- Language: Spanish
- Format: Grupera

Ownership
- Owner: Grupo AS; (Radiodifusoras Cortés, S.A.)
- Sister stations: XHENU-FM, XHNK-FM

History
- First air date: 1950
- Former call signs: XEWL-AM
- Former frequencies: 1090 kHz

Technical information
- Licensing authority: CRT
- Class: A
- ERP: 3,000 watts
- HAAT: 28.5 m (94 ft)
- Transmitter coordinates: 27.4935327°N 99.515622°W

XHWL-FM (103.7 MHz) is a radio station in Nuevo Laredo, Tamaulipas, Mexico.

The station signed on in 1950 as XERG-AM and changed its call sign in 1959.

In April 2018, XEWL began its second-wave AM to FM migration by signing on 103.7 XHWL-FM.
