= XHNOE-FM =

Radio station in Nuevo Laredo, Tamaulipas

XHNOE
- Nuevo Laredo, Tamaulipas; Mexico
- Broadcast area: Nuevo Laredo, Tamaulipas; Laredo, Texas
- Frequency: 91.3 FM
- Branding: Stereo 91 FM

Programming
- Format: Spanish Talk
- Affiliations: Radio Fórmula

Ownership
- Owner: Noe Cuéllar; (X.H.N.O.E. FM, S.A. de C.V.)
- Sister stations: XHGTS-FM

History
- First air date: February 1967
- Call sign meaning: NOE Cuéllar

Technical information
- Licensing authority: CRT
- Class: B
- ERP: 50,000 Watts
- HAAT: 48.5 meters (159 ft)
- Transmitter coordinates: 27°28′33″N 99°30′32″W

Links
- Webcast: listen live
- Website: XHNOE

XHNOE-FM (branded as Stereo 91 FM) is a Spanish-language Talk format FM radio station that serves the Laredo, Texas, United States and Nuevo Laredo, Tamaulipas, Mexico border area.

== History ==
XHNOE was the first FM radio station in the two Laredos, signing on in February 1967. Its original concessionaire was Fidel Cuéllar González and it broadcast with just 890 watts on 93.7 MHz. Upon Fidel's death, Josefina González Vda. de Cuéllar became the concessionaire in 1979. By this time, XHNOE was on 91.3 and had increased its power. A corporation was created to hold the station in 1996.

Longtime station personality Roberto Gálvez Martínez (born July 24, 1945) died of COVID-19 on August 1, 2020; he had worked at XHNOE from 1974 until his death.
