= XHNK-FM =

Radio station in Nuevo Laredo, Tamaulipas

- Nuevo Laredo, Tamaulipas; Mexico
- Broadcast area: Laredo–Nuevo Laredo
- Frequency: 99.3 MHz (HD Radio)
- Branding: Los 40

Programming
- Format: Contemporary hit radio
- Affiliations: Radiópolis

Ownership
- Owner: Grupo AS; (XHNK, S.A.)
- Sister stations: XHWL-FM, XHENU-FM

History
- First air date: November 23, 1973 (concession)
- Call sign meaning: Last name of Guillermo Núñez Keith, original concessionaire

Technical information
- Licensing authority: CRT
- Class: B
- ERP: 14,330 watts
- HAAT: 28.96 m (95.0 ft)
- Transmitter coordinates: 27.4935327°N 99.515622°W

XHNK-FM (99.3 MHz) is a radio station serving Nuevo Laredo, Tamaulipas, Mexico and Laredo, Texas, United States. XHNK is owned by Grupo AS, an affiliate of Radiorama, and carries the Los 40 format from Radiópolis.

== History ==
XHNK was proposed in 1967 and received its concession in 1973. It was owned by and named for Guillermo Núñez Keith.

XHNK was among the first to broadcast in HD Radio in Mexico and the first in the two Laredos.

Recent formats for XHNK have included classic hits Éxtasis Digital, Los 40 Principales, and Arroba FM (Radiorama's CHR pop format). In 2016, XHNK returned to Los 40.
