= Colegio Bilingue Real =

School in Tamaulipas, Mexico

- Royal Bilingual School
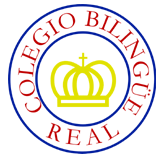
- Official seal
- Other name: CBR
- Motto: Servi, ut magnus sis (Latin)
- Motto in English: Serve, to be great.
- Type: Private
- Established: 1989
- President: Juan de Dios González Cantú
- Location: Nuevo Laredo, Tamaulipas, Mexico
- Website: www.cbr.edu.mx

The Colegio Bilingue Real is a school in Nuevo Laredo, Mexico.

== History ==
Co-founded as an ESL academy by Juan de Dios and Sandra Gonzalez in 1989, the Colegio Bilingue Real was originally called the "Royal English Academy."

The Colegio Bilingue Real has since been expanded piecemeal to include more levels of education. In 1991, the junior high school, Secundaria Bilingue Real, was added. Because of high local demand for quality education, the school incorporated both elementary and highschool by 1994. Since then, it has managed to break local, state and regional academic and cultural records. As of 2009, the school offers kindergarten, elementary, middle-school, highschool and college classes.In 2024 the high school principal, accountant Gerardo Campos, and his partner Elizabeth Castillo, who served as coordinator, were both fired in the spring, resulting in an administrative change.

The school is currently called "Colegio Bilingue Real," which means "Royal Bilingual School."

== Location ==
They are located in the city of Nuevo Laredo in the Mexican state of Tamaulipas. The Kinder, Elementary School and Junior High are located in 27°27′27.24″N 99°30′17.6″W and the address is 5 de Mayo 2329. The High School and University are located in 27°28′32.04″N 99°30′27.2″W and the address is Guerrero 2601.

== Awards ==
- Its high school students have been several times the winners of a local prestigious science competition organized by a local university in the areas of math, physics and chemistry.
- It is in the way of getting the ISO 9001:2000 Certification, given only to those institutions with the highest standards of quality.
- Science and innovation award
- Oratorical contests awards
- Olympic sports awards
