= KJBZ =

Radio station in Laredo, Texas

Coordinates: 27.518°N 99.523°W

- Laredo, Texas; United States
- Broadcast area: Laredo, Texas; Nuevo Laredo, Tamaulipas
- Frequency: 92.7 MHz
- Branding: Z93

Programming
- Format: Regional Mexican

Ownership
- Owner: Guerra Communications, Inc.; (Encarnación A. Guerra)
- Sister stations: KRRG

History
- First air date: 1983
- Former call signs: KFIX (1981-85)

Technical information
- Licensing authority: FCC
- Facility ID: 19545
- Class: A
- ERP: 3,000 watts
- HAAT: 88 meters (289 ft)

Links
- Public license information: Public file; LMS
- Webcast: Listen Live
- Website: z93laredo.com

KJBZ (92.7 FM "Z-93") is a Regional Mexican format radio station that serves the Laredo, Texas, United States and Nuevo Laredo, Tamaulipas, Mexico border area.

== History ==
KJBZ received its license in 1983 and had been assigned its calls two years earlier as KFIX.
