= Paseo Reforma =

Coordinates: 27.4445°N 99.5195°W

- Location: Nuevo Laredo, Mexico
- Developer: Latin American Realty
- Num. of stores: 120+
- Num. of anchor tenants: 3
- Floor area: 425,174 sq ft (39,500.0 m^{2})
- Floors: 1
- Website: paseoreforma.com.mx

Paseo Reforma (Reform Mall) is a regional 425,174 sq ft (39,500.0 m^{2}) indoor mall located in Nuevo Laredo, Tamaulipas, Mexico south in the city's retail district. The shopping mall was built from 2007-2008 and was opened in May 2008 at a cost to developer Latin American Realty of $90 million. It was the first mall of its kind in Nuevo Laredo. The mall has three major anchors (Walmart Super Center, The Home Depot, and Cinépolis) and has sub-anchors such as Famsa. The mall is situated in a lot with a total area of 1,356,468 sq ft (126,020 m^{2}) which includes 2,000 parking spaces and 6 pads for restaurants outside the mall.
