= Estadio Nuevo Laredo =

Baseball stadium in Nuevo Laredo, Mexico

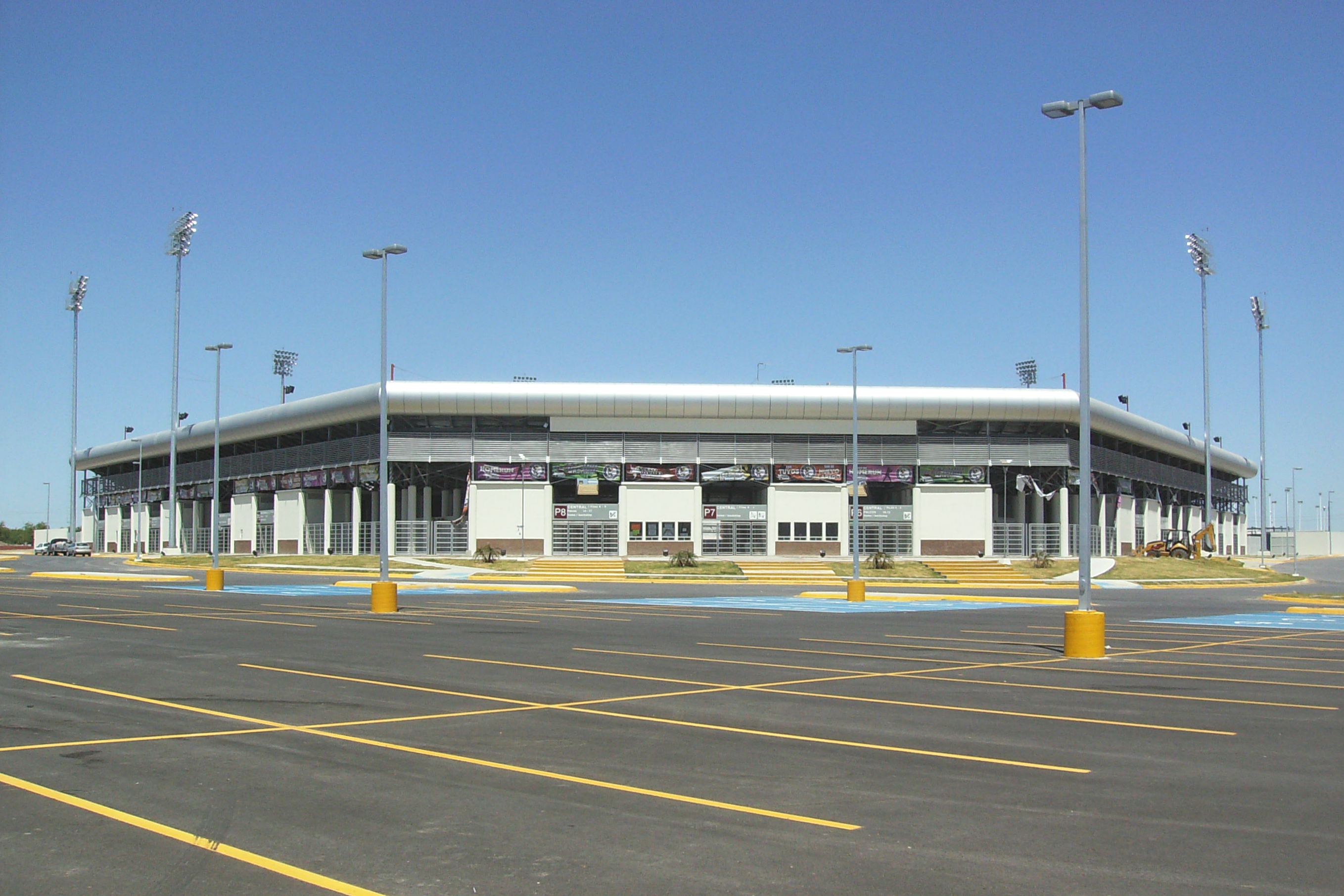
- Interactive map of Estadio Nuevo Laredo
- Location: Ciudad Deportiva in Nuevo Laredo, Mexico
- Coordinates: 27°28′49″N 99°35′31″W
- Owner: City of Nuevo Laredo
- Capacity: 7,555
- Surface: FieldTurf
- Field size: Baseball: LF: 325 ft, CF: 400 ft, RF: 325 ft

Construction
- Groundbreaking: 2007
- Built: 2007
- Opened: 2008
- Architect: Antonio Medina

Tenant
- Tecolotes de Nuevo Laredo (2018)

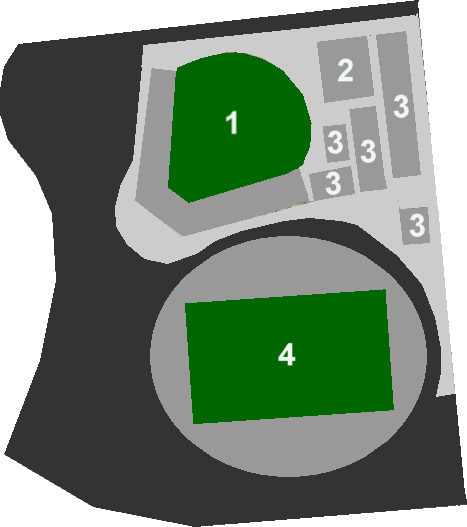
Map of Ciudad Deportiva: 1.Estadio Nuevo Laredo 2.Nuevo Laredo Multidisciplinary Gymnasium: 3. Tennis and Squash Courts; 4. Future Soccer Stadium

The Estadio Nuevo Laredo (Nuevo Laredo Stadium), is a 12,000 seat baseball stadium located in Nuevo Laredo, Tamaulipas, Mexico. It was home to the Tecolotes de Nuevo Laredo from the Mexican Baseball League. The stadium was completed in 2007 as part of Phase I of Ciudad Deportiva, a new sports complex that also houses the Nuevo Laredo Multidisciplinary Gymnasium. The stadium was inaugurated on March 20, 2008 in a game in which the Tecolotes defeated 5-0 the Acereros de Monclova. The stadium has been criticized because of its distance from the city, despite public transportation that has routes from strategic points before and after games.

== History ==
At the end of the 2007 season of the Mexican Baseball League, work began to make efforts to have a professional baseball team return to Nuevo Laredo. After several visits by personnel of the league to the new stadium they agreed to bring back a baseball team and in November 2007 it was announced that the Rieleros de Aguascalientes would become the Tecolotes de Nuevo Laredo for the 2008 season. The stadium is considered one of the best in the league. The field is made from synthetic grass, becoming the third of its kind in the league. Because it was recently constructed, the surface of Estadio Nuevo Laredo is more sophisticated and more similar to natural grass than the two other fields in the Mexican League. It is planned to construct a giant screen and a ceiling covering the seating area.

== Gallery ==
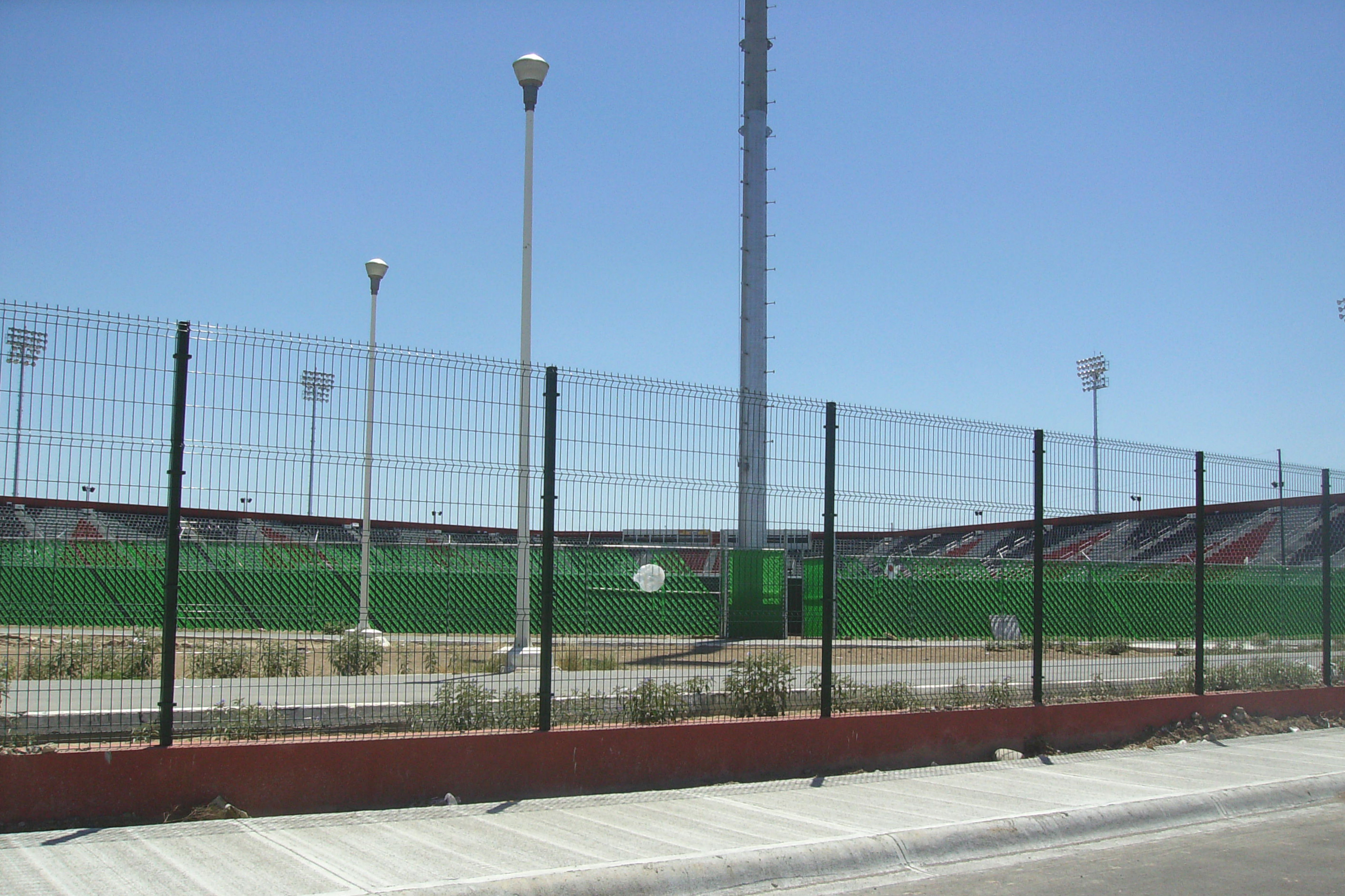
Estadio Nuevo Laredo field

== See also ==
- Gimnasio Multidisciplinario Nuevo Laredo
