= KRRG =

Radio station in Laredo, Texas

Coordinates: 27.5201716°N 99.5222926°W

- Laredo, Texas; United States
- Broadcast area: Laredo, Texas; Nuevo Laredo, Tamaulipas
- Frequency: 98.1 MHz (HD Radio)
- Branding: Big Buck Country 98.1

Programming
- Format: Country
- Subchannels: HD1: Analog simulcast; HD2: NotiGAPE (Spanish variety); HD3: Energy 98 HD3 (1980s hits); HD4: Super Tejano 98.1 HD4 (Tejano)
- Affiliations: Compass Media Networks

Ownership
- Owner: Guerra Communications, Inc.; (Encarnación A. Guerra)
- Sister stations: KJBZ

History
- First air date: October 27, 1982
- Call sign meaning: "Radio Rio Grande"

Technical information
- Licensing authority: FCC
- Facility ID: 19544
- Class: C1
- ERP: 100,000 watts
- HAAT: 213 meters (699 ft)

Links
- Public license information: Public file; LMS
- Webcast: Listen Live; Listen Live (HD2); Listen Live (HD3); Listen Live (HD4)
- Website: bigbuck981.com

KRRG (98.1 FM) is a country music-formatted radio station that serves the Laredo, Texas, United States and Nuevo Laredo, Tamaulipas, Mexico border area.

KRRG broadcasts four HD radio subchannels HD1 is the analog signal, HD2 aires a Spanish variety format branded as NotiGAPE Music, HD3 aires a 1980s hits format branded as Energy 98 HD3, HD4 aires a Tejano format as Super Tejano 98.1 HD4.
