= Gimnasio Multidisciplinario Nuevo Laredo =

Stadium in Ciudad Deportiva, Mexico

Coordinates: 27.480286°N 99.591926°W

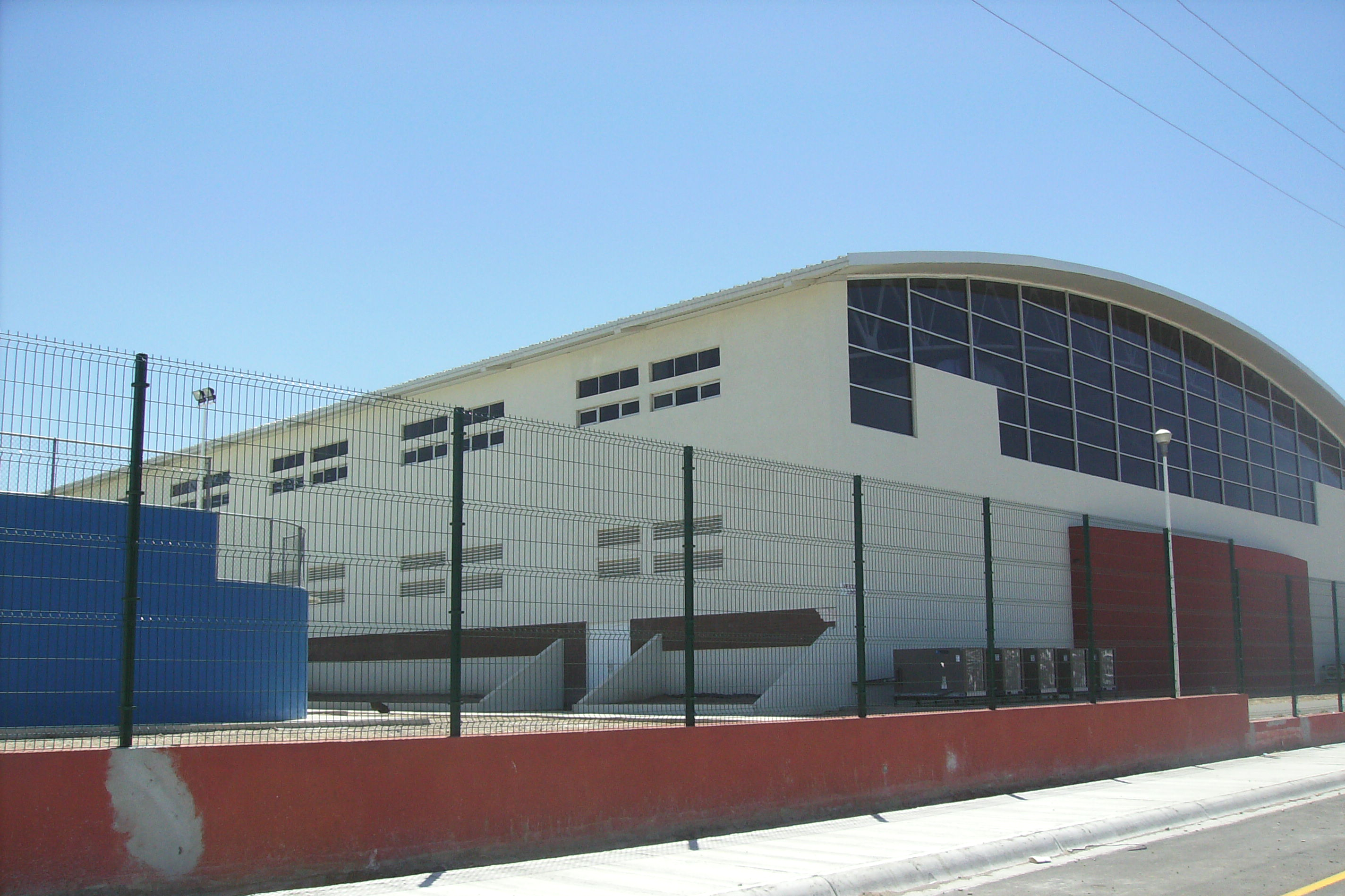
- Interactive map of Gimnasio Multidisciplinario Nuevo Laredo
- Location: Ciudad Deportiva in Nuevo Laredo, Mexico
- Owner: City of Nuevo Laredo
- Capacity: 4,000

Construction
- Opened: 2007
- Cost: 600 000mx

Tenant
- Toros de Nuevo Laredo

The Gimnasio Multidisciplinario Nuevo Laredo (Nuevo Laredo Multidisciplinary Gymnasium), is a 4,000 seat indoor all purpose stadium, primarily used for basketball, located in the Ciudad Deportiva sports complex in Nuevo Laredo, Tamaulipas, Mexico. It is home to the two time Champions Toros de Nuevo Laredo Mexican professional basketball team from the Liga Nacional de Baloncesto Profesional. The stadium was completed in 2007 as part of Phase II of the Ciudad Deportiva, a new sports complex that also houses the Estadio Nuevo Laredo.

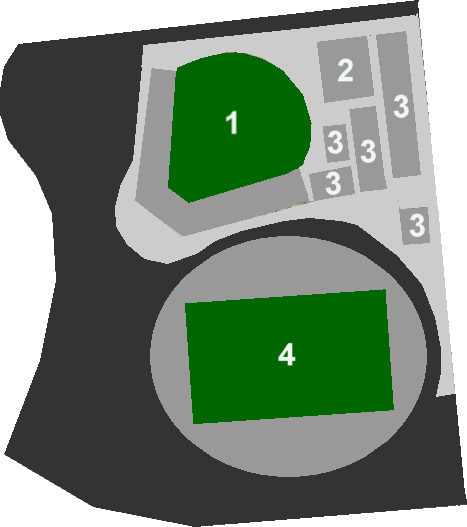
Map of Ciudad Deportiva: 1. Estadio Nuevo Laredo; 2. Nuevo Laredo Multidisciplinary Gymnasium; 3. Tennis and Squash Courts; 4. Future Soccer Stadium

== See also ==
- Ciudad Deportiva
- Estadio Nuevo Laredo
- Venados de Nuevo Laredo
- Nuevo Laredo
