= XHGTS-FM =

Radio station in Nuevo Laredo, Tamaulipas

- Nuevo Laredo, Tamaulipas; Mexico
- Broadcast area: Nuevo Laredo, Tamaulipas; Laredo, Texas
- Frequency: 107.3 MHz
- Branding: XHGTS 107.3, Laredo's Classic Hits

Programming
- Format: Classic hits

Ownership
- Owner: Noe Cuéllar; (Radio BMP de Nuevo Laredo, S.A. de C.V.)
- Sister stations: XHNOE-FM

History
- First air date: 1994
- Call sign meaning: Ciudad Guerrero TamaulipaS

Technical information
- Licensing authority: CRT
- Class: B
- ERP: 23,000 watts
- HAAT: 58.6 m (192 ft)
- Transmitter coordinates: 27°29′00.19″N 99°30′22″W

Links
- Webcast: Listen live
- Website: xhgts.com

XHGTS-FM (107.3 MHz) is a classic hits-format radio station in Nuevo Laredo, Tamaulipas, Mexico, serving Nuevo Laredo and Laredo, Texas, United States. It is owned by Noe Cuéllar.

== History ==
The concession for XHGTS-FM was awarded in 1994. The original concession specified Ciudad Guerrero, Tamaulipas as the location of the station, which was promptly moved to Nuevo Laredo. Until 2012, the station had previously carried a Spanish CHR format as "Digital 107.3" until switching formats with KQUR. It then became "iLike" with a contemporary hit radio format in English and Spanish.

On May 20, 2022, XHGTS-FM flipped to classic hits as "Laredo's Classic Hits 107.3", now targeting the Laredo, TX area.
