= Sports City =

Sports City can refer to:

Stadium	Capacity	City	Country	Opening
Sardar Vallabhbhai Patel Sports Enclave	132,000	Ahmedabad	India	2021
Aspire Zone	40,000+	Doha	Qatar	2003
Azadi Sport Complex	84,412	Tehran	Iran	1971
Basra Sports City	60,000	Basra	Iraq	2013
Dubai Sports City	60,000	Dubai	United Arab Emirates	2009
Jakabaring Sport City	23,000	Palembang	Indonesia	2004
King Abdullah Sports City	100,000	Jeddah	Saudi Arabia	2014
Latakia Sports City	45,000	Latakia	Syria	1987
National Sports Complex	45,000	Kuala Lumpur	Malaysia	1992
Singapore Sports Hub	55,000	Kallang	Singapore	2014
City of Sports Complex	18,000	Rio de Janeiro	Brazil	2007
Manchester Sports City	41,000	Manchester	England	2012
Tunis Sports City	20,000	Tunis	Tunisia	2014
Zayed Sports City	43,000	Abu Dhabi	United Arab Emirates	2009
