= Primera Hora (Mexico) =

Mexican newspaper

- Type: Daily newspaper
- Format: Tabloid
- Owner: Benjamín Galván Gómez
- Editor: Luis Cesar Martinez Cruz
- Founded: October 24, 2001
- Headquarters: Nuevo Laredo, Tamaulipas
- Website: primerahora.com.mx

Primera Hora (First Hour) is a Spanish language newspaper published in Nuevo Laredo, Tamaulipas, Mexico. The newspaper was founded on October 24, 2001, by Benjamín Galván Gómez. The newspaper is printed daily at 10:00 AM CST to ensure the latest news is read and the newspaper is sold until 5:30 PM CST. Primera Hora is also circulated in Laredo, Texas, United States.

On September 26, 2011, Mexican police discovered the body of Marisol Macias Castaneda, an administrative manager for Primera Hora and online administrator for Nuevo Laredo En Vivo under the name NenaDLaredo, decapitated and accompanied by a note "attributed to a criminal group". Macias Castaneda's identity was confirmed by Primera Hora and by the Tamaulipas state secretary of the interior. Some sources reported the dead journalist's identity as María Elizabeth Macias Castro.

== See also ==
- List of newspapers in Mexico
