= Ciudad Deportiva (Nuevo Laredo) =

Sports complex in Nuevo Laredo, Mexico

Coordinates: 27.4796°N 99.5917°W

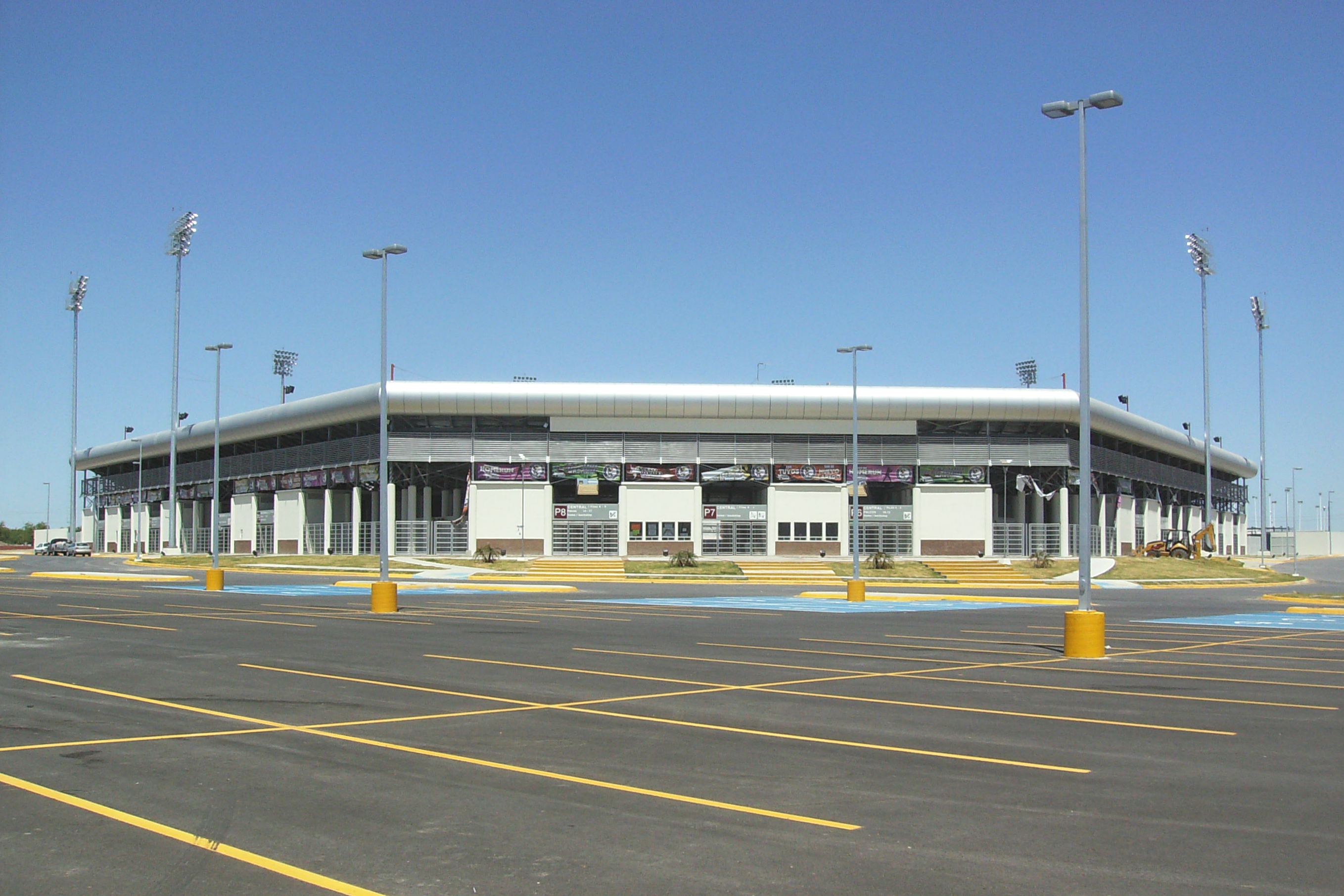
- Interactive map of Ciudad Deportiva
- Location: Nuevo Laredo, Mexico
- Owner: Nuevo Laredo
- Capacity: Baseball 12,000; Basketball 4,000

Construction
- Built: 2007
- Opened: March 2008
- Cost: $17,190,000 (phase 1)

Tenant
- Tecolotes de Nuevo Laredo (LMB) 2008-2011 Toros de Nuevo Laredo (LNBP) 2007-2010 Toros de Nuevo Laredo (LNBP) 2010-present

The Ciudad Deportiva (Sports City) is a sports complex in Nuevo Laredo, Mexico. It is home to the Tecolotes de Nuevo Laredo Mexican Baseball League team and the Toros de Nuevo Laredo Mexican professional basketball team from the Liga Nacional de Baloncesto Profesional. The Ciudad Deportiva's Estadio Nuevo Laredo (baseball park) can seat up to 12,000 fans at a baseball game and the Nuevo Laredo Multidisciplinary Gymnasium can seat 4,000 fans at a basketball game.

== Phase II ==
Phase II of this project will include a new soccer stadium within Mexican Primera Division standards for a possible expansion of one of its teams to Nuevo Laredo. Part of Phase II has already been completed which includes an indoor stadium with a capacity of 4,000 fans that allows fans to enjoy basketball, volleyball, and gymnastics among other sports.

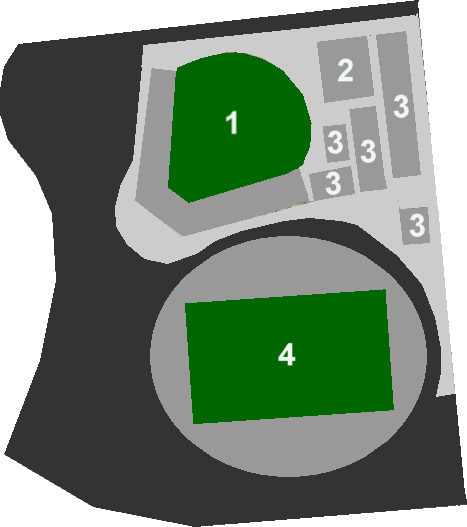
Map of Ciudad Deportiva: 1.Estadio Nuevo Laredo 2.Nuevo Laredo Multidisciplinary Gymnasium: 3. Tennis and Squash Courts; 4. Future Soccer Stadium

== Gallery ==
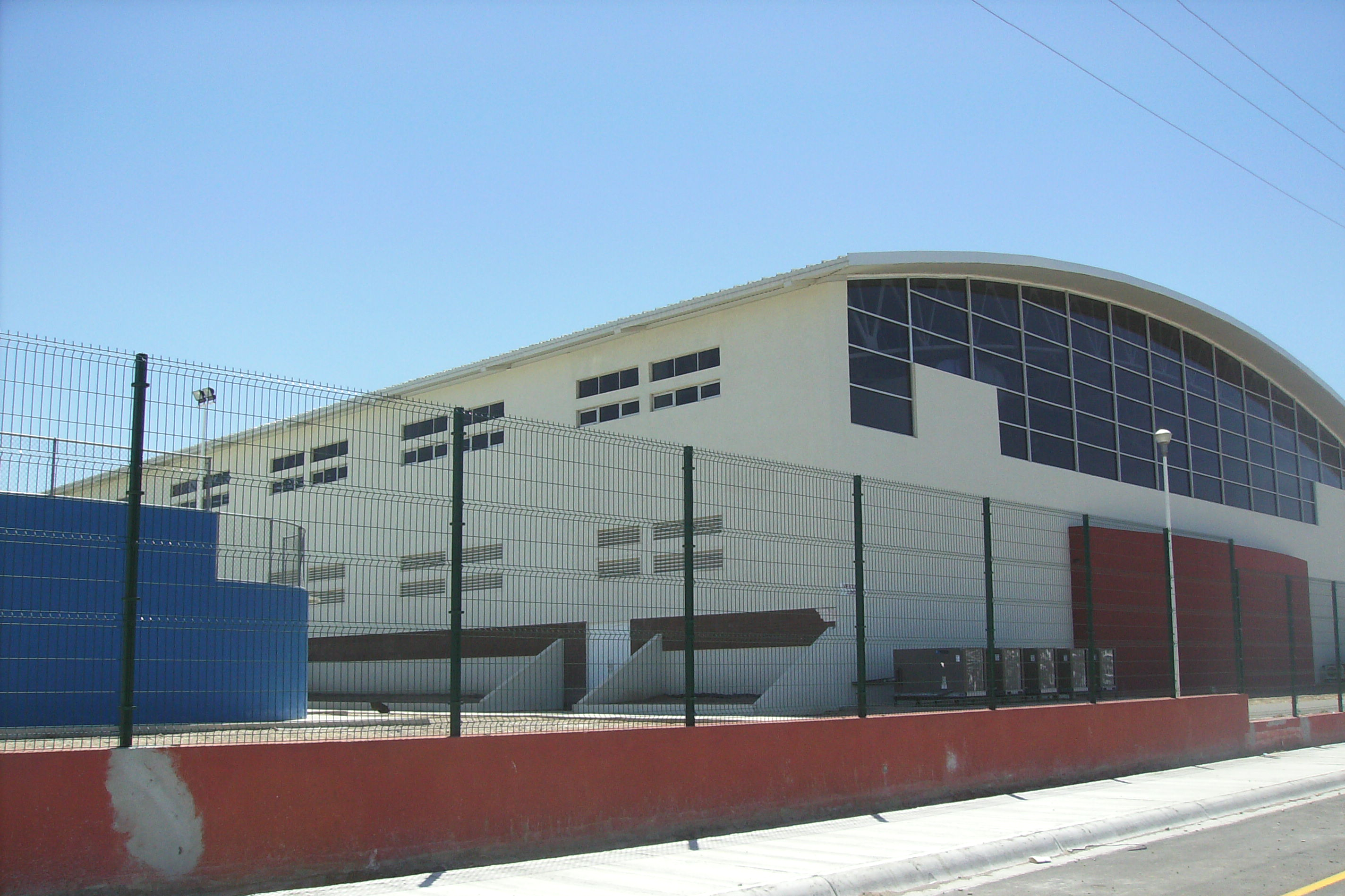
Indoor Stadium of Phase II

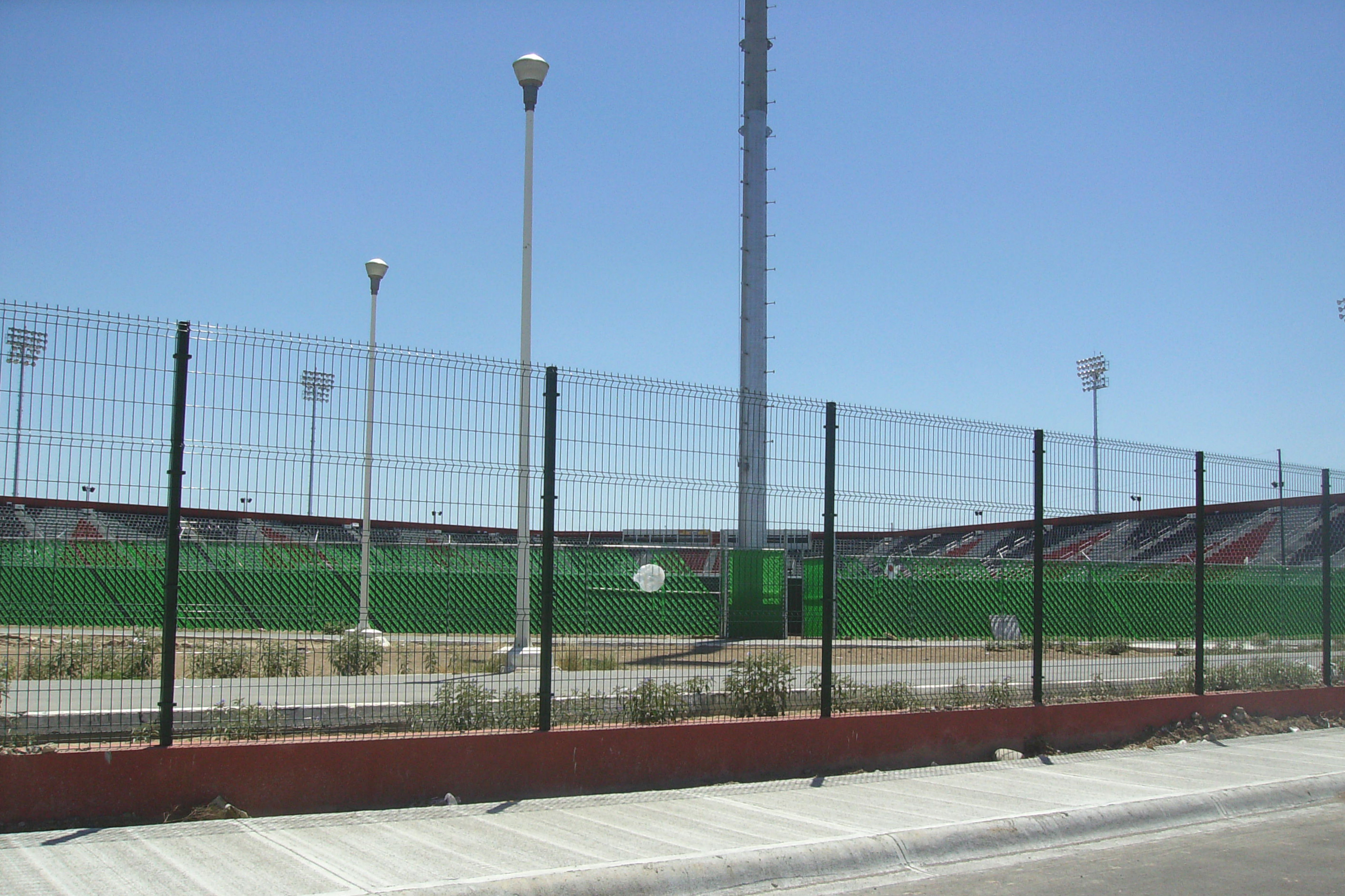
Ciudad Deportiva's Baseball Field

== See also ==
- Estadio Nuevo Laredo
- Tecolotes de Nuevo Laredo
- Gimnasio Multidisciplinario Nuevo Laredo
- Toros de Nuevo Laredo
- Nuevo Laredo
