= Nuevo Laredo =

City in Tamaulipas, Mexico

- City
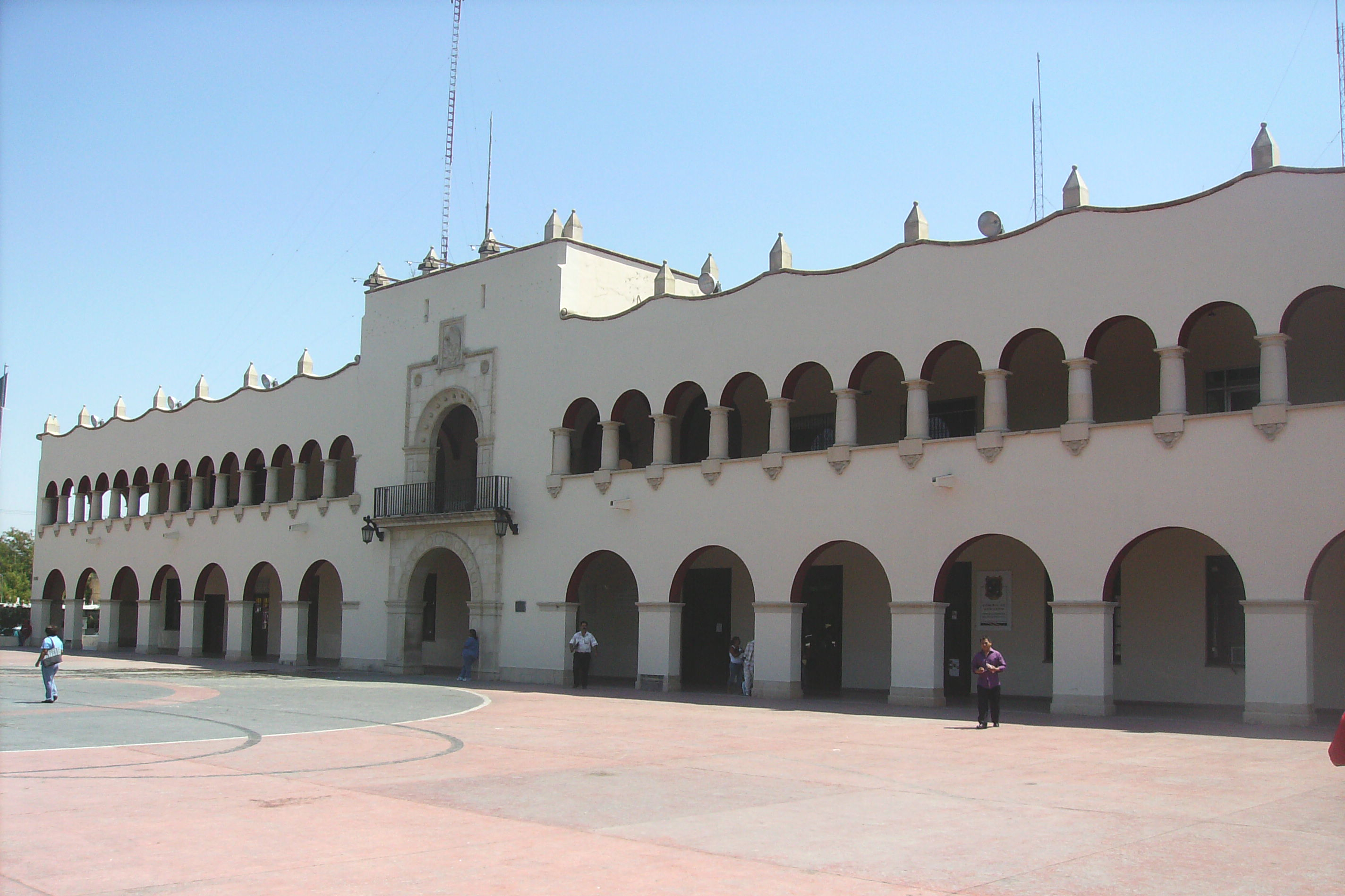
- Federal palace of Nuevo Laredo

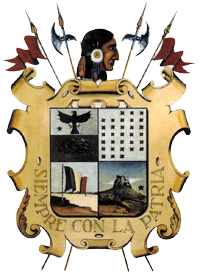
- Coat of arms
- Nicknames: Capital Aduanera de Latino América (Customs Capital of Latin America); Puerta a México (Door to Mexico)
- Motto: Siempre con la Patria (Always with the Motherland)
- Location within Tamaulipas Location within Mexico Location within North America
- Coordinates: 27°29′09″N 99°31′51″W
- Country: Mexico
- State: Tamaulipas
- Municipality: Nuevo Laredo
- Settled: 1755
- Established: 1848
- Founder: Tomás Sánchez

Government
  - Presidente Municipal: Carmen Lilia Canturosas Villarreal

Area
  - City: 1,334.02 km^{2} (515.07 sq mi)

Population (2020 census)
  - City: 416,055
  - Metro: 636,516
- Metro area includes Laredo, Texas, Nuevo Laredo, Tamaulipas, Colombia, Nuevo León, & Villa Hidalgo, Coahuila.
- Time zone: UTC−06:00 (Zona Centro)
  - Summer (DST): UTC−05:00 (DST)
- Codigo Postal: 88000
- Area code: +52 867
- Website: Official Site

Nuevo Laredo (Spanish pronunciation: [ˈnweβo laˈɾeðo]) is a city in the Municipality of Nuevo Laredo in the Mexican state of Tamaulipas. The city lies on the banks of the Rio Grande, across from Laredo, Texas, United States. The 2010 census population of the city was 373,725. Nuevo Laredo is part of the Laredo-Nuevo Laredo Metropolitan Area with a population of 636,516. The municipality has an area of 1,334.02 km^{2} (515.07 sq mi). Nuevo Laredo is considered the “customs capital of Latin America” because of its high volume of international trade operations in the region, and number 1 in importance for US inland commercial traffic. Both the city and the municipality rank as the third largest in the state.

The city is connected to Laredo, United States by three international bridges and a rail bridge. The city is larger and younger than its US counterpart. As an indication of its economic importance, one of Mexico's banderas monumentales is in the city (these banderas have been established in state capitals and cities of significance).

== History ==
=== Pre-Hispanic period ===
Before the founding of Nuevo Laredo, the area was inhabited by different nomadic indigenous tribes. The most prominent indigenous group to have lived in the Nuevo Laredo region were the Coahuiltecas. The Coahuiltecas were hunter-gatherers who manufactured many stone and leather artifacts in order to survive the harsh environment.

Later, the region saw the influx of other nomadic indigenous tribes, such as the Apaches and Comanches. The increasing numbers of Apaches led the Spanish authorities to establish military garrisons and towns to serve as a buffer zone against northern indigenous tribes. Laredo (now in Texas) was one of those towns founded by the Spanish, from which Nuevo Laredo would stem into existence.

=== Colonial period ===
Nuevo Laredo was part of the territory of the original settlement of Laredo (now in Texas) which was founded in 1755 by the Spaniard Don Tomás Sánchez in the northern part of the Rio Grande. The settlement's territory was granted to José de Escandón by the King of Spain, and the settlement's territory and population remained unified for ninety years, until the war of 1846–1848, the Mexican–American War.

=== Independent period ===
Early in 1848, the Treaty of Guadalupe Hidalgo divided the territory attached to Laredo between the United States (Texas) and Mexico (Tamaulipas). Nuevo Laredo was founded on June 15, 1848, by seventeen Laredo families who wished to remain Mexican and therefore moved to the Mexican side of the Rio Grande. They identified with Mexico, its history, and its cultural customs, and decided to keep their Mexican citizenship. The founders of Nuevo Laredo even took with them the bones of their ancestors so they would continue to rest in Mexican ground.

In August 25, 1855 the customs house was officially established in Nuevo Laredo by orders of Santiago Vidaurri, governor of Nuevo León and Coahuila, and military chief of Tamaulipas. This was to collect import taxes at the new border with the United States.

In 1858 a duty-free zone was established along the border with the United States. Nuevo Laredo fell inside this area of tax exemption in order to be competitive with American markets. The creation of this border economic zone was ratified three years later by president Benito Juárez.

During the early stage of international trade that crossed through the Nuevo Laredo-Laredo border, activity in general was low but high in import-export of cattle, gold, silver and leather.

In 1881, the railroad infrastructure connecting Nuevo Laredo with central Mexico and with San Antonio, Texas was established by president Porfirio Díaz. This created the need to build a more formal Customs House building equipped to this new reality in 1887. The new economic boom made Nuevo Laredo become the 3rd most important international commercial crossing in Mexico, so in 1891 the Congress of the state of Tamaulipas formally elevated the status of Nuevo Laredo to a city.

=== Modern period ===
20th-century Nuevo Laredo was politically and socially dominated locally by the presence of the PRI political party and workers' unions. While economically, the city continued to be influenced by international trade with the United States and its influential customs office.

The Nuevo Laredo customs office became so important, that the city began to attract an influx of population from different regions of the country. Custom officials were brought from Mexico City to fill the ever-growing departments within the Custom offices in the international bridges, railroad, airport, checkpoints, tax-collecting offices, and administration office.

The population growth attracted more people, which led to chaotically expand its urban sprawl. The eastern side is enclosed by the Rio Grande River, so people had no choice but to settle in its western side, locally known as el poniente (the west). Hence, the west-side of Nuevo Laredo became poverty-stricken, unprivileged and crime infested.

In the 1980s and 1990s municipal presidents of Nuevo Laredo focused their efforts in regularizing the west-side settlements into incorporated neighborhoods. In the 2000s and 2010s endeavors by municipal presidents shifted to paving streets and building schools for west-side Nuevo Laredo. But no intention was ever accomplished to eliminate crime.

In 2013, the decade-long PRI party hegemony in Nuevo Laredo was broken when Carlos Enrique Canturosas Villarreal of the PAN political party was elected municipal president.

A shortage of natural gas led to blackouts in Texas and along the border during the February 13–17, 2021 North American winter storm. Millions on both sides of the border were left without gas or electricity, heat or running water. Factories and restaurants were forced to close, and people lost their jobs. Mayor Enrique Rivas Cuéllar called upon the population not to panic.

As of February 19, 2021, Nuevo Laredo reported 4,714 cases of COVID-19.

=== Drug-related violence ===
As a border town, Nuevo Laredo is known for its turf war in which drug cartels compete for control of the drug trade into the United States. Nuevo Laredo is a lucrative drug corridor. A large number of trucks pass through the area. There are multiple exploitable ports of entry.

==== Los Texas ====
During the 1980s and 1990s the criminal syndicate known as Los Texas was based in Nuevo Laredo and operated all over the Mexican states of Coahuila and Tamaulipas as well as the US state of Texas. Their leader was Arturo Martinez Herrera "El Texas".

Their criminal activity began as coyotes, sending illegal immigrants into the United States. Then they used illegal immigrants to cross the border with drugs. Their grip on Nuevo Laredo against other criminal groups generated deadly violence.

"El Texas" was arrested, and Guillermo Martinez Herrera "El Borrado" took control of Los Texas. When "El Borrado" was captured, Daniel Martinez Herrera "El Negro" became the leader, although true power remained with "El Borrado" who operated from his luxurious prison cell at Nuevo Laredo's La Loma prison.

==== Los Zetas ====
Los Zetas, the armed wing of the Gulf Cartel, and based in Nuevo Laredo, escalated violence to unprecedented violence in the summer of 2003 through gruesome violence and military-like tactics against the Sinaloa Cartel. Los Zetas also instilled terror against journalists and civilians of Nuevo Laredo. This set a new precedent which cartels later mimicked.

Los Zetas and Gulf Cartel separated in early 2010 and fought for the control of the smuggling routes to the United States. As of 2012, Los Zetas were thought to be Mexico's largest criminal organization. 2012 saw an unprecedented series of mass murder attacks in the city between the Sinaloa Cartel and Gulf Cartel on one side and Los Zetas on the other.

Los Zetas had a rapid expansion of their criminal activities. Based in Nuevo Laredo, they expanded to 17 Mexican states. They caused many notable massacres across many of these states. Stretching of resources as well as the capture and killing of their main leaders contributed to the decline of Los Zetas. The criminal organization ceased to exist under this name and structure, in its place Cartel Del Noreste (Northeastern Cartel) or CDN was born.

==== Cartel del Noreste ====
The Cartel del Noreste, known locally by its initials CDN, grew power from its deep historical roots in Nuevo Laredo. The CDN managed to pushed away their rival cartels, Zetas Vieja Escuela and Gulf Cartel, grasping control of Nuevo Laredo. CDN also held control of Nuevo Laredo because its top leaders are locals and members of the Treviño family. First, Juan Francisco Treviño Chávez, alias "El Kiko" assumed leadership of the CDN cartel. After his capture in 2016, Juan Gerardo Treviño Chávez, alias "El Huevo" assumed control of CDN.

In March 2022, the Mexican military arrested "El Huevo", sparking an extreme outbreak of violence marked by an hours-long firefight, burned-out vehicles, and shots fired at the United States Consulate in Nuevo Laredo.

On November 29, 2023, the leader of the CDN Cesar Silva Delgado "El Tartas" was captured by the Mexican military and the Mexican National Guard in Nuevo Laredo. During his arrest, authorities seized a gold-plated AK-47, a handgun, ammo and magazines for high-caliber firearms. Authorities also seized 2,500 fentanyl pills.

In February 2025, a joint operation by The Secretariat of National Defense was carried out with the assistance from Mexican Navy, Attorney General's Office, the Mexican National Guard and the Department of Security and Citizen Protection, that led to the capture of Ricardo González Sauceda, aliases 'El Ricky' or 'Mando R,' in Nuevo Laredo, Tamaulipas. Authorities said that on August 17, González Sauceda coordinated an attack on the Mexican military in Nuevo Laredo, injuring five soldiers and killing two. "El Ricky" is also accused of the deaths of six officers within the Nuevo León Civil Force.

== Geography ==
Nuevo Laredo is in the northern tip of Tamaulipas on the west end of the Rio Grande Plains. The Rio Grande is the only source that supplies its citizens with water. El Coyote Creek supplies Nuevo Laredo's only natural lake El Laguito (The Small Lake). The area consists of a few hills and flat land covered with grass, oak, and mesquite.

=== Climate ===
Nuevo Laredo features a semi-arid climate. Nuevo Laredo's weather is influenced by its proximity to the Chihuahuan Desert to the west, by the Sierra Madre Oriental mountains to the south and west, and by the Gulf of Mexico to the east. Much of the moisture from the Pacific is blocked by the Sierra Madre Oriental. Therefore, most of the moisture derives from the Gulf of Mexico. Its geographic location causes Nuevo Laredo's weather to range from long periods of heat to sudden violent storms in a short period of time. Nuevo Laredo is cold for Tamaulipas standards during winter, the average daytime highs are around 19 °C (66 °F) and overnight lows around 6 °C (43 °F); although it is rare for snow to fall in Nuevo Laredo, there was actually snow on the ground for a few hours on the morning of Christmas Day 2004.

Nuevo Laredo experiences an average high temperature of about 102 °F (39 °C), and an average low of about 24 °C (75 °F) during summer, and 510 millimetres (20 in) of rain per year. As Laredo sometimes undergoes drought, a water conservation ordinance was implemented in 2003.

Climate data for Nuevo Laredo Nuevo Laredo (Observatorio) 1991–2020 normals, extremes 1961–present
Month	Jan	Feb	Mar	Apr	May	Jun	Jul	Aug	Sep	Oct	Nov	Dec	Year
Record high °C (°F)	38.5 (101.3)	37.0 (98.6)	40.0 (104.0)	44.0 (111.2)	45.0 (113.0)	49.0 (120.2)	46.0 (114.8)	45.0 (113.0)	43.0 (109.4)	40.0 (104.0)	37.0 (98.6)	34.5 (94.1)	49.0 (120.2)
Mean daily maximum °C (°F)	19.8 (67.6)	23.1 (73.6)	27.2 (81.0)	31.4 (88.5)	35.1 (95.2)	38.3 (100.9)	38.9 (102.0)	38.9 (102.0)	35.2 (95.4)	30.6 (87.1)	24.8 (76.6)	20.4 (68.7)	30.3 (86.5)
Daily mean °C (°F)	13.4 (56.1)	16.3 (61.3)	20.3 (68.5)	24.5 (76.1)	28.5 (83.3)	31.6 (88.9)	32.2 (90.0)	32.2 (90.0)	29.0 (84.2)	24.3 (75.7)	18.6 (65.5)	14.3 (57.7)	23.8 (74.8)
Mean daily minimum °C (°F)	7.1 (44.8)	9.4 (48.9)	13.4 (56.1)	17.6 (63.7)	21.8 (71.2)	24.8 (76.6)	25.4 (77.7)	25.4 (77.7)	22.8 (73.0)	18.0 (64.4)	12.4 (54.3)	8.1 (46.6)	17.2 (63.0)
Record low °C (°F)	−8.5 (16.7)	−7 (19)	−2.5 (27.5)	2.5 (36.5)	8.5 (47.3)	14.0 (57.2)	15.0 (59.0)	16.5 (61.7)	10.0 (50.0)	1.0 (33.8)	−4.5 (23.9)	−10 (14)	−10 (14)
Average precipitation mm (inches)	21.1 (0.83)	22.4 (0.88)	23.4 (0.92)	35.0 (1.38)	64.8 (2.55)	53.2 (2.09)	41.5 (1.63)	40.5 (1.59)	64.8 (2.55)	51.2 (2.02)	23.4 (0.92)	21.1 (0.83)	462.4 (18.20)
Average precipitation days (≥ 0.1 mm)	4.2	3.5	2.8	3.1	4.8	4.2	3.6	4.1	5.6	4.5	3.5	4.2	48.1
Source: Servicio Meteorológico Nacional

</ref>

== Government ==
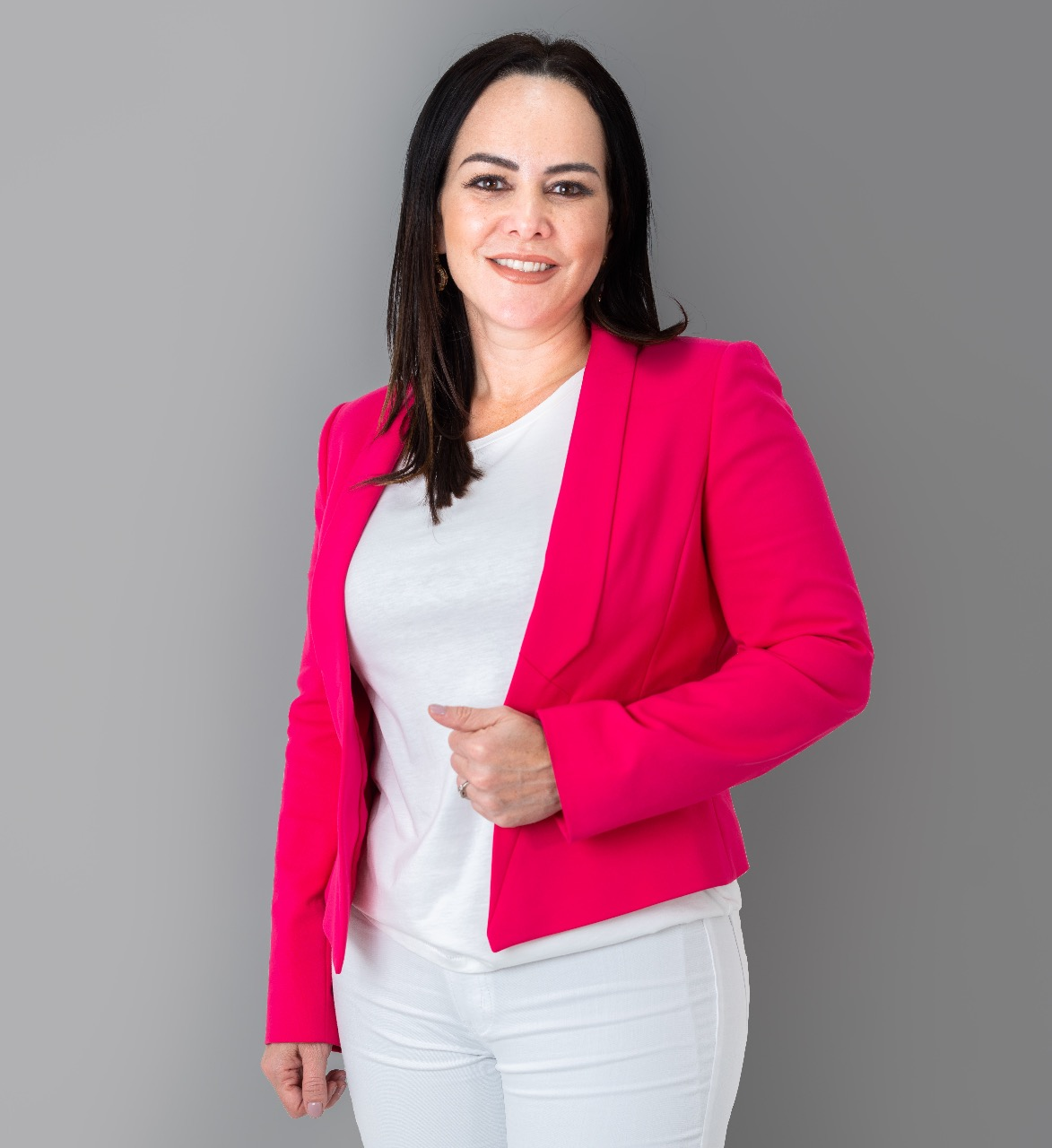
Carmen Lilia Canturosas Villarreal, current Mayor of Nuevo Laredo.

Nuevo Laredo is governed by an elected Ayuntamiento, which is composed of the Presidente Municipal (Municipal President, equivalent of a Mayor), two Síndicos (high-ranking council members), and 21 Regidores (council members). The mayor is in charge of the municipal administration. The Síndicos supervise the municipal budget and expenditures, and the Regidores represent the people of different neighborhoods of Nuevo Laredo as well as their own political party.

Carmen Lilia Canturosas Villarreal is the current municipal president of Nuevo Laredo. MORENA is the current ruling political party in the city.

=== Composition of the municipal government ===
Government of Nuevo Laredo
Title	Name	Political party
Municipal President	Carmen Lilia Canturosas Villareal	
Sindico 1	Jesús Alberto Jasso Montemayor	
Sindico 2	Imelda Mangin Torre	
Council Member 1	Luis Cavazos Cárdenas	
Council Member 2	Julia Élida Ortega de los Santos	
Council Member 3	José Fidencio Cantú	
Council Member 4	Nubia Lizeth Almaguer	
Council Member 5	Sergio Arturo Ojeda Castillo	
Council Member 6	Yoliria Fuentes Garza	
Council Member 7	Santos Francisco Hernández Aguilar	
Council Member 8	Mariza Yazmín Zárate Flores	
Council Member 9	Guadalupe Zapata Muñiz	
Council Member 10	Macarena Corazón González Nuñez	
Council Member 11	Francisco Javier Altamirano Carrasco	
Council Member 12	Erika Nancy Mendoza Chávez	
Council Member 13	Enrique Figueroa Rocha	
Council Member 14	Claudia Araceli Flores Medina	
Council Member 15	Ernesto Ferrara Theriot	
Council Member 16	Roberto Viviano Vázquez Macias	
Council Member 17	Jorge Alfredo Ramírez Rubio	
Council Member 18	Samantha Ofelia Bulas Liguez	
Council Member 19	Daniel Treviño Martínez	
Council Member 20	María de la Luz Mejia Martínez	
Council Member 21	Ariana Garza López	

=== Public safety ===
Public safety is provided by three municipal departments: (1) municipal police (Dirección de Seguridad Ciudadana), (2) traffic control (Dirección de Seguridad Vial), and (3) the emergency services department (Dirección de Protección Civil, Bomberos y Desastres).

As well as the State Police Force Tamaulipas ("Fuerza Tamaulipas") replacing former Acreditable State Police ("Polícia Estatal Acreditable")

Because of the drug-related violence, Federal level departments take part in the security effort, SEDENA Military Police ("Polícia Military") Mexican Army Troops, SEMAR Mexican Navy Troops and the National Guard of Mexico.

== Economy ==
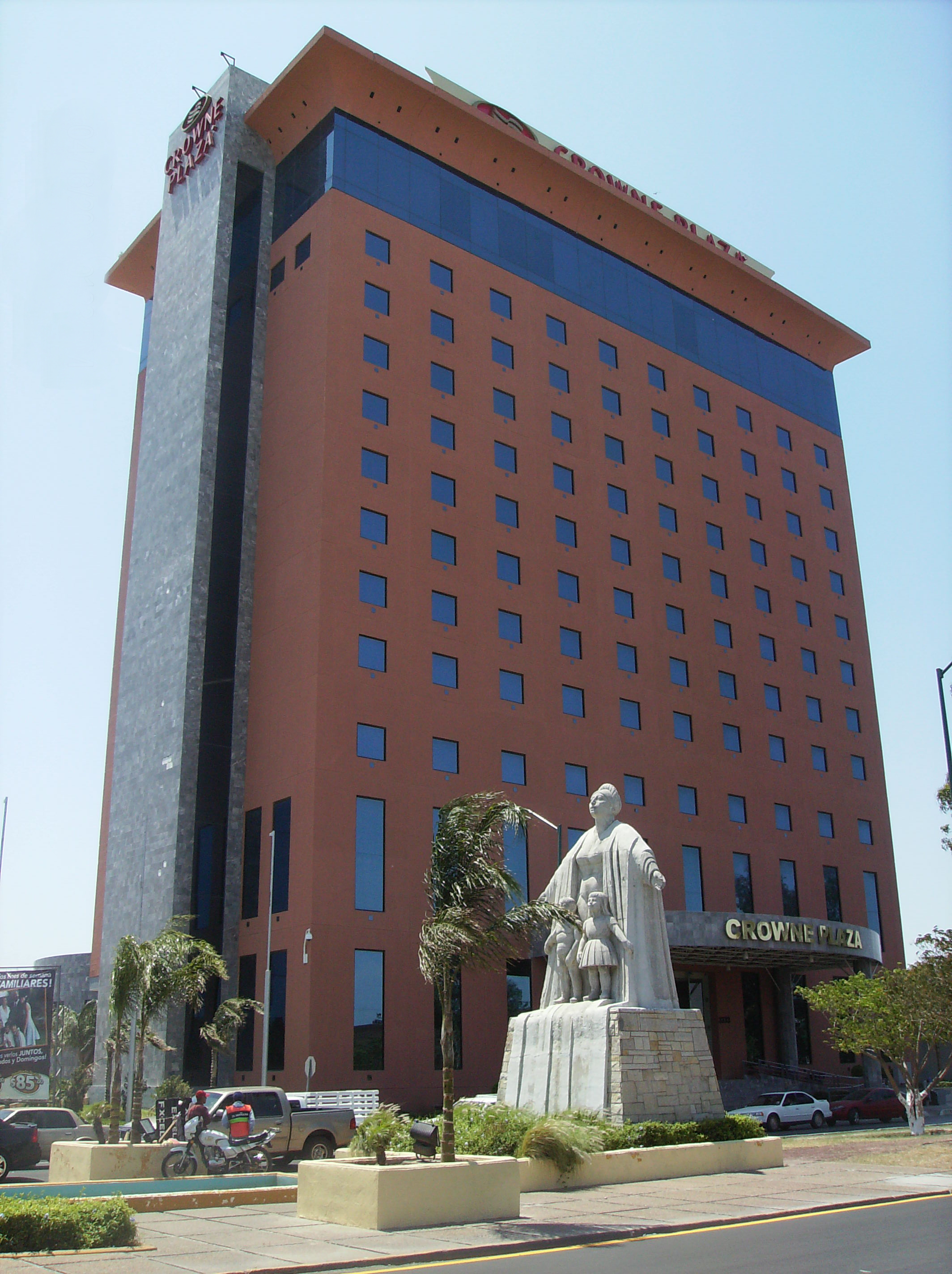
The Monument to Mothers in front of the Best Western Plus Nuevo Laredo hotel

Nuevo Laredo (along with Laredo, Texas) is the most important trade border crossing of Latin America (approximately 8500 trucks cross the border each day). Its geographical position has enabled this city to grow and specialize in the international trade business. Nuevo Laredo has a very developed logistics and transportation industry, complemented with a variety of hotel chains, restaurants and a cultural center where events such as the Tamaulipas International Festival take place.

Nuevo Laredo is on the primary trade route connecting Canada, the United States and Mexico. Nuevo Laredo is the only Mexico/U.S. border city positioned at the convergence of all land transportation systems. The main highway and railroad leading from Central Mexico through Mexico City, San Luis Potosí, Saltillo and Monterrey join with two major U.S. rail lines at Nuevo Laredo and major American highway Interstate 35, thus offering access to the most important metropolitan areas and seaports of Texas, as well as northern states and Canada. For more than a decade, Mexico's economic policies have increased Mexico/U.S. trade and cross-border production in the Nuevo Laredo area.

There are three bridges in the Nuevo Laredo area: International Bridge #1 (the oldest), International Bridge #2 (also known as Juarez-Lincoln; no pedestrians), and International Bridge #3 (also known as the Free Trade or Libre Comercio Bridge, inaugurated in 1999, cargo only). There is also the Colombia-Solidarity (Solidaridad) Bridge (located about 20 miles (32 km) northwest of the city in Colombia, Nuevo León). There are no urban areas on either side of this bridge.

Nuevo Laredo is a strategic investment point. On this site there are six recognized industrial parks: Oradel Industrial Center, Longoria Industrial Park, Rio Bravo Industrial Park, Modulo Industrial America, FINSA Industrial Park, and Industrial Park Pyme.

== Education ==
The educational infrastructure amounted to 288 school sites: 71 kindergartens, 148 elementary schools, 34 junior high schools, 14 high schools, 13 vocational schools and 12 universities.

=== Higher education ===
There are twelve universities in Nuevo Laredo. Undergraduate studies normally last at least 3 years, divided into semesters or quarters, depending on the college or university.

Every graduate gets a bachelor's degree (Licenciatura or Ingenieria). Some of these universities also offer postgraduate studies. A "maestría" is a two-year degree after a bachelor's degree, which awards the title of Master (Maestro).

- Universidad Autónoma de Tamaulipas (UAT) has two faculties. The faculty of commerce, administration and social sciences offers bachelor's degrees in International Trade, Computing, Business Administration, Law, and Accountancy. The faculty of nursing offers bachelor's degrees in Nursing, Health, Safety and Environment.
- Instituto Tecnologico de Nuevo Laredo (ITNL) offers bachelor's degrees in: Architecture, Civil Engineering, Electrical Engineering, Computer Systems Engineering, Industrial Engineering, Mechanical Engineering, Business Administration, Accountancy, Electronic Engineering, Mechatronics Engineering, and Enterprise Management Engineering.
- Universidad Valle del Bravo-Valle de Mexico (UVB-UVM) offers bachelor's degrees in Law, Psychology, Graphic Design, International Trade, International Marketing, Business Administration, Tourism, International Relations, Communications, Accountancy, Political Sciences, Industrial Administration Engineering, Computer Systems Engineering, Electronic Systems Engineering, Civil Engineering, Environmental Engineering, Mechanical Electrician Engineering, Security and industrial Hygiene Engineering, and Dentistry.
- Universidad Tecnologica de Nuevo Laredo (UT) offers bachelor's degrees in Enterprise Development Engineering, Global commercial logistics Engineering, Industrial Maintenance Engineering, Mechatronics Engineering, Renewable Energy Engineering. It also offers associate degrees in Logistic and Autotransport Administration, Tariff Classification and Customs Clearance, Electronics and Automated, Industrial Maintenance, Sales and Distribution.
- Centro de Estudios Superiores Royal (CES-R, Royal University) offers bachelor's degrees in International Trade, Marketing and Publicity, Business Administration, Computer Systems Engineering, Organizational Psychology, and Accountancy.
- Instituto de Ciencias y Estudios Superiores de Tamaulipas' (ICEST) offers bachelor's degrees in Communications, Nutrition, Criminology, Psychology, Languages, International Trade, Dramatic Literature and Theater, Chemical Pharmacist Biologist, Nursing, Library Science, Tourism, Computer Systems Engineering, and Chemical Engineering.
- Universidad TecMilenio (UTM) offers bachelor's degrees in Business Administration, Intelligence of Markets, International Trade, Graphic Design and Animation, Industrial Engineering, Logistics systems Engineering, Development of software Engineering, and International Businesses Engineering.
- Universidad Del Norte De Tamaulipas (UNT) offers bachelor's degrees in Political sciences and Administration, Administration and Marketing, International Trade and Customs, Computer Systems Engineering, and Accountancy.
- Universidad Panamericana (UP) offers bachelor's degrees in Business Administration, Accountancy, Law, Junior High Education, Kindergarten Education, Civic and Ethical, Psychology, Surgeon (obstetrician), Surgeon (Zootechnician), Industrial Engineering, and Computer Systems Engineering.

Nuevo Laredo has three teacher training programs:

- Normal Básica Cuauhtemoc offers bachelor's degrees in Elementary Education and Kindergarten Education.
- Normal Superior De Tamaulipas opened in August 2005 and offers bachelor's degrees in Physical Education and Junior High Education. It also offers specialities in Spanish, Mathematics, and English Instruction.
- Universidad Pedagógica Nacional (UPN) offers bachelor's degrees in Education and Educational intervention.

== Transportation ==
=== Air ===
Nuevo Laredo is served by the Quetzalcóatl International Airport with daily flights to Mexico City. The neighboring Laredo International Airport in Laredo, Texas has daily flights to Houston (George Bush Intercontinental Airport) and to Dallas/Fort Worth International Airport and Tri-weekly flights to Las Vegas, Nevada and bi-weekly seasonal (May–August) flights to Orlando, Florida.

=== Mass transit ===
Transporte Urbano de Nuevo Laredo (TUNL) is the mass transit system that operates in Nuevo Laredo with fixed routes with millions of passengers per year. TUNL works with a fleet of fixed-route buses. TUNL's hub is located in downtown Nuevo Laredo.

- Ruta 1 Guerrero
- Ruta 2 20 De Noviembre – Campanario
- Ruta 2 20 De Noviembre – Valles De Anáhuac
- Ruta 3 5 Colonias Azul
- Ruta 3a 5 Colonias Verde
- Ruta 4 Colonia Las Torres – Panteón – Puente
- Ruta 5 Victoria – Viveros – Verde
- Ruta 5a Victoria – Viveros – Azul
- Ruta 6 Rivereña – Buenavista – Centro
- Ruta 7 Mina – Constitucional
- Ruta 7a Olivos X Arteaga - Cortes Villada – Mina – Constituciónal
- Ruta 8 Mirador – Panteón
- Ruta 8 Mirador – Reforma
- Ruta 10 Kilometro 15 – Colonia Primavera – Kilometro 18
- Ruta 11 Carretera – Colonia Burócrata – Centro
- Ruta 12 Laredo Tx – Benito Juárez
- Ruta 12 Laredo Tx – Issste
- Ruta 13 Valles De Anáhuac – Conalep
- Ruta 13 Valles De San Miguel – Valles De Anáhuac
- Ruta 13a Campanario – Conalep
- Ruta 15 Cavazos Lerma
- Ruta 17 Granjas – Fracc. Itavu – Km 13 – Km 18 – Centro
- Ruta 17a Granjas – Fracc. Itavu – Km 13 – Km 18 – Centro
- Ruta 17b Km 13 – Santa Cecilia
- Ruta 19 Unión Del Recuerdo
- Ruta 19a Colonia Los Artistas – Naciones Unidas – Centro
- Ruta 20 Cortes Villada – La Sandia – Joya – Centro
- Ruta 21 Rivereña – Virreyes
- Ruta 22 Las Torres – Panteón – Bolívar – Centro
- Ruta 22a Las Torres – Panteón – Bolívar – Centro
- Ruta 23 Mina - Voluntad y Trabajo 2 y 3
- Ruta 24 Voluntad - Nueva Era-Buenos Aires por Independencia
- Ruta 24a Voluntad – Nueva Era – Buenos Aires Por Independencia
- Ruta 28 Las Alazanas
- Ruta 29 Reservas Territoriales – Colonia Hipódromo – Centro
- Ruta 30 Reservas Territoriales – Colonia Buenos Aires – Centro
- Ruta 31 Reservas Territoriales – Conalep
- Ruta 32 Colonia Insurgentes – Conalep – 150 Aniversario
- Ruta 35 Kilometro 10 – Panteón – Colinas Del Sur
- Ruta 35a Kilometro 10 – Panteón – Colinas Del Sur
- Ruta 36 Fraccionamiento América – Nogal – La Concordia – Centro
- Ruta 36a Fraccionamiento América – Nogal por Coca-Cola

=== International bridges ===
- Gateway to the Americas International Bridge
- Juárez-Lincoln International Bridge
- World Trade International Bridge (commercial traffic only)
- Patrick J. Ottensmeyer International Railway Bridge

=== Major highways ===
Major highways in Nuevo Laredo and their starting and ending points:

- Mexican Federal Highway 85 Nuevo Laredo-Mexico City
- Mexican Federal Highway 2 Matamoros-Nuevo Laredo-Colombia-Ciudad Acuña
- Tamaulipas State Highway 1 Nuevo Laredo-Monterrey
- Nuevo León State Highway Spur 1 Colombia-Anáhuac

=== Nearby cities ===
City	Population	Distance (km)
Laredo, Texas	236,091	0 mi (0 km)
Monclova, Coahuila	294,191	124 mi (199 km)
Monterrey, Nuevo León	3,664,334	125 mi (201 km)
Reynosa, Tamaulipas	526,888	130 mi (209 km)
Corpus Christi, Texas	409,741	131 mi (211 km)
San Antonio, Texas	1,942,217	154 mi (248 km)
Heroica Matamoros, Tamaulipas	462,157	167 mi (268 km)
Saltillo, Coahuila	648,929	181 mi (291 km)

== Sports ==
=== Baseball ===
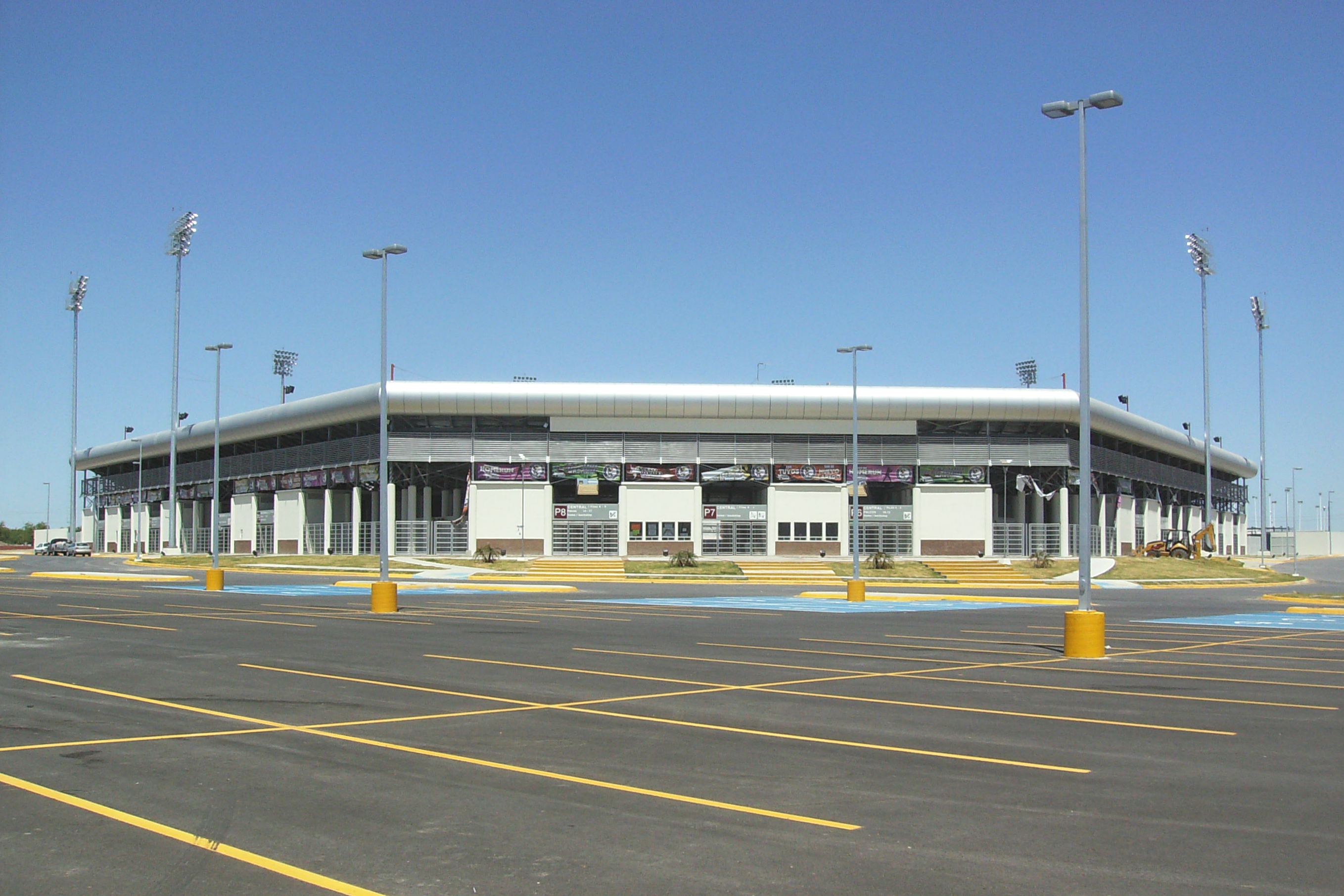
Ciudad Deportiva Baseball Park

==== Tecolotes de los Dos Laredos ====
The Tecolotes de los Dos Laredos (Owls of the Two Laredos) are a team in the Mexican Baseball League who split their games between Nuevo Laredo and Laredo, Texas. The Tecolotes were the Mexican League Champions in 1953, 1954, 1958, 1977, and 1989 and runner-ups in 1945, 1955, 1959, 1985, 1987, 1992, 1993.

Their games in Nuevo Laredo are played in Parque la Junta, which opened in 1947 and has a capacity of 6,000 people. The team left the park in 2003 for Estadio Nuevo Laredo, located on the west side of the city, a move that was criticized. In 2019, Parque la Junta was refurbished to once again host the Tecolotes.

==== Liga Oriente ====
The Liga Oriente (internationally known as Oriente Little League of Nuevo Laredo) is a local baseball children's team which has participated in Little League World Series representing Mexico, and has participated and won Little League Nationals in Mexico.

Liga Oriente won the championship of Little League Mexican Nationals in 2010 and 2021.

=== Football ===
The Bravos de Nuevo Laredo is a football club in the Tercera División in Nuevo Laredo. The Unidad Deportiva Benito Juárez (Benito Juárez Sport Complex) is their home stadium. The Bravos are an institution formed in 2004 by a groups of business people in Nuevo Laredo, whose objective is to organize a football team in the city with aspirations to become a professional football club. This was the first team to have all their games transmitted live via an internet website until the end of the 2010 tournament.

The Ciudad Deportiva (Sports City) is a sports complex built in 2007 whose main feature is a baseball park in Nuevo Laredo, Mexico. It is home to the Tecolotes de Nuevo Laredo Mexican Baseball League team. The Ciudad Deportiva can seat up to 12,000 fans at a baseball game. Phase one of this project has been completed which only included the Baseball Park. Phase II of this project will include a new soccer stadium within Mexican Primera Division standards for a possible expansion of one of its teams to Nuevo Laredo. Phase II also includes a gym that will seat 1,500 fans to enjoy basketball, volleyball, and gymnastics among other sports.

=== Basketball ===
The Toros de Nuevo Laredo is a basketball team in Nuevo Laredo, playing in the Mexican professional league Liga Nacional de Baloncesto Profesional (LNBP). The Toros de Nuevo Laredo play in the Ciudad Deportiva Indoor Stadium. They entered the league in 2009 to join the North Conference. Prior to the Toros de Nuevo Laredo, Nuevo Laredo had the Venados de Nuevo Laredo which played on the LNBP for the 2007–2008 season.

=== Volleyball ===
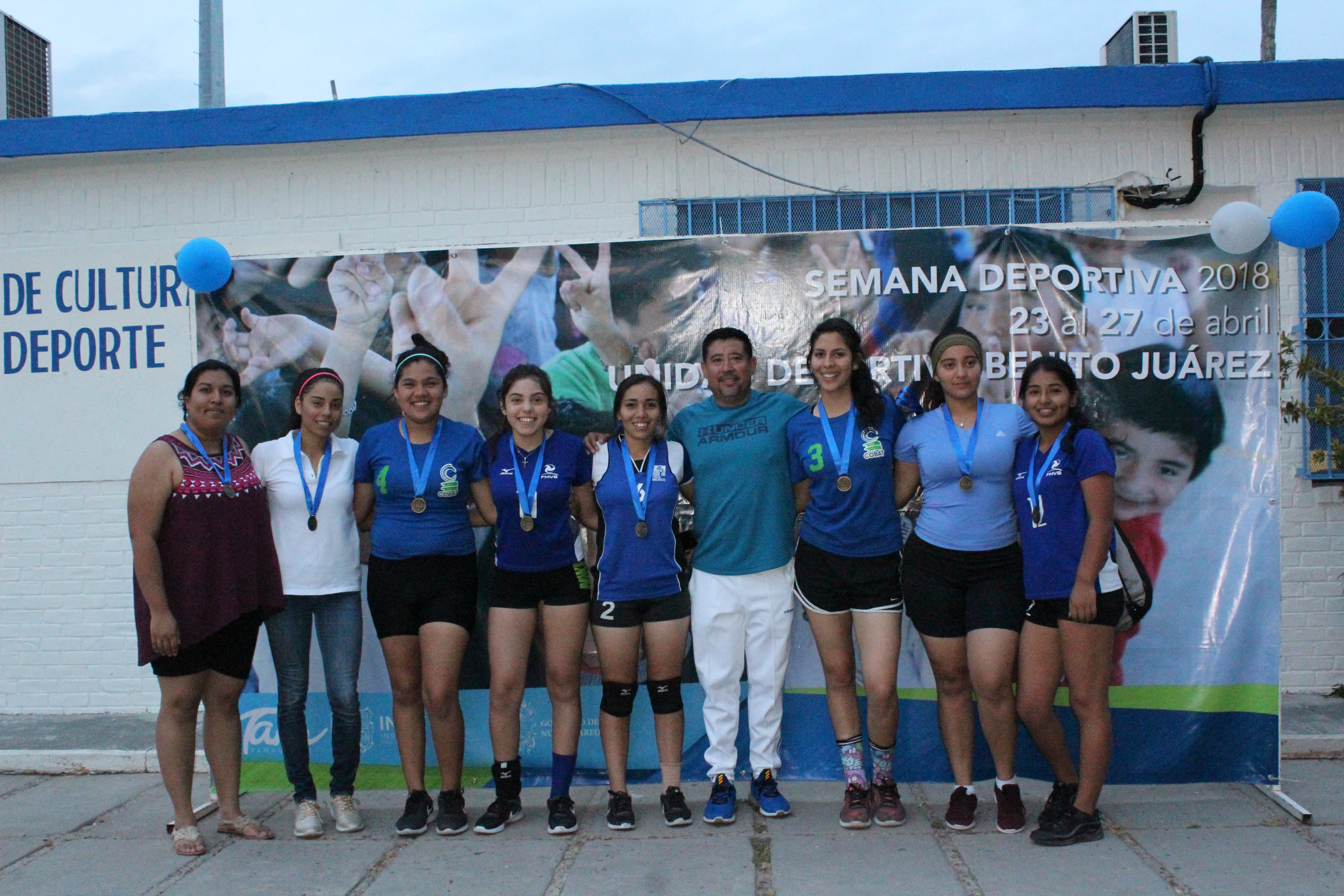
The COBAT high school women's team, led by their coach Erika Edith Garza Dominguez and their captain Erika Castro, 2018 champions of the Nuevo Laredo Sport Week

Nuevo Laredo has different local volleyball leagues from which some players and coaches have emerged to the national spotlight.

Recently, the city has become the home of professional volleyball teams of the Mexican National League, including the Jaguars of Nuevo Laredo (men's professional volleyball team) and Venadas of Nuevo Laredo (women's volleyball team).

=== Charreria ===
In Nuevo Laredo, Charrería is a well-known sport, having several teams such as Asociación de Charros Rancho Media Luna, and Santa María 05. The Santa María 05 team has won many competitions, including being the 2010 Tamaulipas state champion. The city's lienzos charros are the Rancho Media Luna, located in Kilómetro 10, and the Nuevo Laredo, located behind the Expomex grounds.

== Entertainment ==
The city has a variety of tourist attractions such as:

- Cultural Center. Opened in 2004, the cultural center has a main theater, experimental theater, natural history museum, Reyes Meza museum, gourmet restaurant, cafeteria, temporary exhibition area, library, book shop, media library, and Uxmal walk where there are pre-Columbian works of art with colossal sculptures of gods and idols of the Mesoamerican cultures.
- Natural history museum. It was opened in 2007, in its permanent museum exposes human skeletons, dinosaur bones and fossils in general that allows to make a chronological history travel of the region, fauna, flora and geography, from the jurassic to our era.
- Jose Reyes Meza Museum. Opened in June 2008 It has the name of a remarkable painter, designer and muralist from Tamaulipas, the museum exposes various plastic works.
- Regional Zoo. It has a wide range of animal species from different ecosystems and from the region, it is located next to the Ecological Park "Viveros" and receives hundreds of visitors daily.
- Word Station Gabriel García Márquez. Dedicated to the writer Gabriel García Márquez, Nobel laureate in literature, this cultural space opened in September 2008 and has an auditorium, exhibition gallery, library, reading rooms, children's room, literary coffee and book shop.
- The House of Culture. It has the theater "Lucio Blanco", in the house of culture occur cultural events, also there are classes of music, painting, dance and literature.
- Old Customs Building. The building was restored and adapted to serve as a cultural space, with the concert hall "Sergio Pena," the great forum and an exhibitions gallery.
- Longoria bank museum. It was built in 1929 by Don Octavio Longoria, currently its lobby is used to exhibit plastic arts and photography.
- Historical Archive. In it lies the documentary and graphic memory of the city, also has temporary exhibitions, consultation area, audiovisual area and the site museum which displays railroad artifacts, photographs and documents of time alluding to the history of the Railroad in Nuevo Laredo.
- Parque Viveros (En: Viveros Park) is a 124-acre (0.50 km^{2}) forest park that overlooks the Rio Grande on the eastern side of Nuevo Laredo. The park features a zoo, two large swimming pools, walking trails, and picnic areas with barbecue pits and playgrounds.
- IMSS theater. It presents plays, musicals, movies and other events.
- Sports city (ciudad deportiva). It has a baseball stadium, the multidisciplinary gymnasium of basketball, tennis courts, squash courts and soccer court
- Market Maclovio Herrera. It is located in the historic city center, here you can find many kinds of Mexican crafts from all the country, e.g. costumes, jewelry, traditional Mexican candies and piñatas.
- Narciso Mendoza park. It has the Fidel Cuellar library, a walking trail around the park (circuit almost 800 m), a FutRap court and a playground.
- Adolfo Lopez Mateos city theater
- Recreational park El Laguito
- Art Gallery "Casa Black"
- Polyforum Dr. Rodolfo Torre Cantu. A place to hold events and mass entertainment was opened on September 4, 2013. It has the capacity to hold over 5,000 people and parking for over 1,000 vehicles. The project is still under construction and includes a civic center, stage performances, cultural walk, aquarium, soccer fields and basketball courts and more.

There is a fairly large array of night-time entertainment venues. Most establishments (clubs, bars, and restaurants) are located in the historical district. Other restaurants (including chains) are located along Avenida Vicente Guerrero and Avenida Reforma. Nuevo Laredo has a red light district called Boy's Town, (or "La Zona"). The city has some malls like Paseo Reforma, opened in May 2008. Other shopping centers are Plaza Real, Plaza 2 Laredos, and Plaza Commercial La fe.

=== Theaters ===
Nuevo Laredo has three main theaters, the "Centro Cultural", "Teatro de la Ciudad", and "Casa de Cultura". The Centro Cultural (En: Cultural Center) is Nuevo Laredo's main theater with a seating capacity of 1,200. It has presented high level shows high level, plays, concerts and dance recitals, and one independent art gallery, "Casa Black" that opens twice a year for a single weekend. The theater has a museum, library, and cafeteria. The Teatro de la Ciudad (En: City Theater) is a theater which presents plays, dance recitals, concerts and musical shows and special events. The Casa de Cultura (En: House of Culture) houses music, painting, dance and literature workshops and also presents major artistic and cultural events such as art exhibitions, concerts, film samples, dance recitals and plays, among others.

== Media ==
=== Newspapers ===
Name	Frequency	Language	City	Website
El Diario de Nuevo Laredo	Daily	Spanish	Nuevo Laredo	diariolaredo.com
El Mañana (Nuevo Laredo)	Daily	Spanish	Nuevo Laredo	elmanana.com.mx
LareDOS	Monthly	English	Laredo	laredosnews.com
Laredo Morning Times	Daily	English	Laredo	lmtonline.com
Laredo Sun	Online newspaper	English	Laredo	laredosun.us
Lider	Daily	Spanish	Nuevo Laredo	liderinformativo.com
Primera Hora	Daily	Spanish	Nuevo Laredo	primerahora.com
Última Hora	Daily	Spanish	Nuevo Laredo	ultimahora.com

=== AM radio ===
Frequency	Callsign	Brand	City of license	Website	Webcast
530	WPMQ285	TxDOT HAR	Laredo	•	•
790	XEFE	La Mera Ley	Nuevo Laredo	•	listen live
890	KVOZ	Radio Cristiana	Laredo	lanuevaradiocristiana.com	•
960	XEK	La Grande	Nuevo Laredo	xek.com	listen live
1000	XENLT	Radio Formula	Nuevo Laredo	radioformula.com	•
1090	XEWL	W-Radio	Nuevo Laredo	wradio.com.mx	listen live
1300	KLAR	Radio Poder	Laredo	feypoder.com	listen live
1340	XEBK	exa FM	Nuevo Laredo	exafm.com.mx	•
1370	XEGNK	Radio Mexicana	Nuevo Laredo	•	listen live
1410	XEAS	Ke Buena	Nuevo Laredo	kebuena.com	listen live
1490	KLNT	ESPN Radio	Laredo	•	•
1550	XENU	La Rancherita	Nuevo Laredo	•	listen live
1610	WPMQ285	TxDOT HAR	Laredo	•	•

=== FM radio ===
Frequency	Callsign	Brand	Format	City of license	Website	Webcast
88.1	KHOY	Catholic Radio	Religious	Laredo	khoy.org	listen live
88.9	XHLDO-FM	Radio Tamaulipas	Public Radio	Nuevo Laredo	tamaulipas.gob	listen live
89.9	KBNL	Radio Manantial	Spanish Religious	Laredo	kbnl.com	•
91.3	XHNOE-FM	Stereo 91.3 FM	Spanish Contemporary	Nuevo Laredo	xhnoe.com	listen live
92.7	KJBZ	Z93	Tejano	Laredo	z933.com	•
94.1	XHTLN-FM	Imagen / RMX Laredo	Talk / Contemporary	Nuevo Laredo	rmx.com.mx	listen live
94.9	KQUR	Digital 94.9	Spanish Top 40	Laredo	digital949.com	listen live
95.7	XHBK-FM	Exa FM	Spanish Contemporary	Nuevo Laredo	•	•
96.5	XHTWO-FM	Radio TWO	Norteño/Contemporary	Nuevo Laredo	•	•
97.1	XHNLO-FM	Multimedios Radio	Spanish Contemporary	Nuevo Laredo	mmradio.com	listen live
98.1	KRRG	Big Buck Country	Country	Laredo	bigbuck98.com	•
99.3	XHNK-FM	Digital Ecstasy	Classic Hits	Nuevo Laredo	radiorama.com	listen live
100.5	KBDR	La Ley	Tejano	Laredo	laley1005.com	listen live
101.5	XHAS-FM	Ke Buena	Norteño	Nuevo Laredo	kebuena.com	listen live
102.3	XHMW-FM	Los 40 Principales	Spanish Pop	Nuevo Laredo	radiorama.com	listen live
103.3	XHAHU-FM	Radio Nuevo León	Spanish Pop	Anáhuac	•	listen live
104.5	NEW	La Más Pesada	Norteño	Nuevo Laredo	•	•
104.9	XHNLR-FM	Radio UAT	University Radio	Nuevo Laredo	uat.mx	•
106.1	KNEX	Hot 106.1	Urban / Rhythmic Top 40	Laredo	hot1061.com	listen live
106.5	NEW	La Tremenda	Norteño	Nuevo Laredo	tremenda.com.mx	•
107.3	XHGTS-FM	Me Gusta 107.3	Top 40	Nuevo Laredo	xhgts.com	listen live
162.55	WXK26	NOAA Weather Radio	Weather	Laredo	noaa.gov	•

=== Television ===
VC	DT	Callsign	Network	Resolution	City of license	Official website	Notes
1.1	23.1	XHLNA	Azteca Uno	HD 1080i	Nuevo Laredo	tvazteca.com	•
1.2	23.2	XHLNA-TDT2	ADN 40	SD 480i	Nuevo Laredo	adn40.mx	•
2.1	29.1	XHLAR-TDT	Las Estrellas	HD 1080i	Nuevo Laredo	lasestrellas.tv	•
3.1	35.1	XHCTNL-TDT	Imagen Televisión	HD 1080i	Nuevo Laredo	imagentv.com	•
3.4	35.4	XHCTNL-TDT4	Excélsior TV	SD 480i	Nuevo Laredo	excelsior.com	•
4.1	25.1	XHBR-TDT	Televisa Nuevo Laredo	HD 1080i	Nuevo Laredo	televisaregional.com	•
5.1	25.1	XHBR-TDT2	Canal 5	SD 480i	Nuevo Laredo	televisa.com	•
6.1	32.1	XHNAT-TDT	Multimedios Plus	HD 720p	Nuevo Laredo	multimedios.com	•
6.2	32.2	XHNAT-TDT2	Milenio TV	SD 480i	Nuevo Laredo	milenio.com	•
6.3	32.3	XHNAT-TDT3	Teleritmo	SD 480i	Nuevo Laredo	multimedios.com	•
6.4	32.4	XHNAT-TDT4	MVS TV	SD 480i	Nuevo Laredo	mvstv.com	•
7.1	33.2	XHLAT-TDT	Azteca 7	HD 1080i	Nuevo Laredo	tvazteca.com	•
7.2	33.9	XHLAT-TDT2	a+	SD 480i	Nuevo Laredo	tvazteca.com	•
8.1	8.3	KGNS-TV	NBC	HD 1080i	Laredo	kgns.tv	•
8.2	8.4	KGNS-DT2	ABC	HD 720p	Laredo	kgns.tv	•
8.3	8.5	KGNS-DT3	Telemundo	HD 720p	Laredo	telemundolaredo.tv	•
8.5	8.7	KGNS-DT5	True Crime Network	SD 480i	Laredo	truecrimenetworktv.com	•
10.1	10.1	KXNU-LD	Telemundo	HD 720p	Laredo	telemundolaredo.tv	•
13.1	13.3	KYLX-LD	CBS	HD 1080i	Laredo	cbs.com	•
13.2	13.4	KYLX-LD2	The CW	SD 480i	Laredo	yourcwtv.com	•
15.1	15.1	KLMV-LD	MeTV	SD 480i	Laredo	metv.com	•
15.2	15.2	KLMV-LD2	Estrella TV	SD 480i	Laredo	estrellatv.com	•
15.3	15.3	KLMV-LD3	Movies!	SD 480i	Laredo	moviestvnetwork.com	•
15.4	15.4	KLMV-LD4	Jewelry TV	SD 480i	Laredo	jtv.com	•
17.1	17.1	XEFE-TV	Televisa Local	HD 1080i	Nuevo Laredo	xefetv.com	•
27.1	19.1	KLDO-TV	Univision	HD 1080i	Laredo	noticiasya.com	•
27.2	19.2	KLDO-DT2	LATV	SD 480i	Laredo	latv.com	•
27.3	19.3	KLDO-DT3	TBD	SD 480i	Laredo	tbd.com	•
27.4	19.4	KLDO-DT4	Stadium	SD 480i	Laredo	watchstadium.com	•
27.5	19.5	KLDO-DT5	Court TV	SD 480i	Laredo	courttv.com	•
31.1	31.1	KXOF-CD	Fox / MyNet	HD 720p	Laredo	foxnewssouthtexas.com	•
31.2	31.2	KXOF-CD2	Grit	SD 480i	Laredo	grittv.com	•
31.3	31.3	KXOF-CD3	Laff	SD 480i	Laredo	laff.com	•
39.1	27.1	KETF-CD	Unimas	HD 720p	Laredo	ketftv.com	•
39.2	27.2	KETF-CD2	Comet	SD 480i	Laredo	comettv.com	•
39.3	27.3	KETF-CD3	Charge!	SD 480i	Laredo	watchcharge.com	•
39.4	27.4	KETF-CD4	Azteca America	HD 720p	Laredo	aztecaamerica.com	•

== Notable people ==
- Carlos Domínguez Rodríguez - journalist murdered during the Mexican drug war
- Norma Elia Cantú - postmodernist writer and professor of English
- Brenda Cardenas Thomae - congresswoman for Nuevo Laredo at the Congress of Tamaulipas
- Benjamín Galván Gómez - mayor of Nuevo Laredo murdered during the Mexican drug war
- Mauricio González de la Garza - journalist, writer and music composer
- Laredo Kid - masked professional wrestler
- José Medellín - convicted murderer executed in Texas for the Murders of Jennifer Ertman and Elizabeth Peña
- Carlos Mercado - footballer
- Rolando Quintanilla - racing driver
- Arturo Santos Reyes - boxer
- Miguel Treviño Morales - leader of Los Zetas Cartel during the Mexican drug war
- Omar Treviño Morales - leader of Los Zetas Cartel during the Mexican drug war
- Iván Velázquez Caballero - and leader of Los Zetas Cartel during the Mexican drug war

== See also ==
- Oradel Industrial Center
