= Farmacias Guadalajara =

Mexican drugstore chain

Farmacia Guadalajara Logo

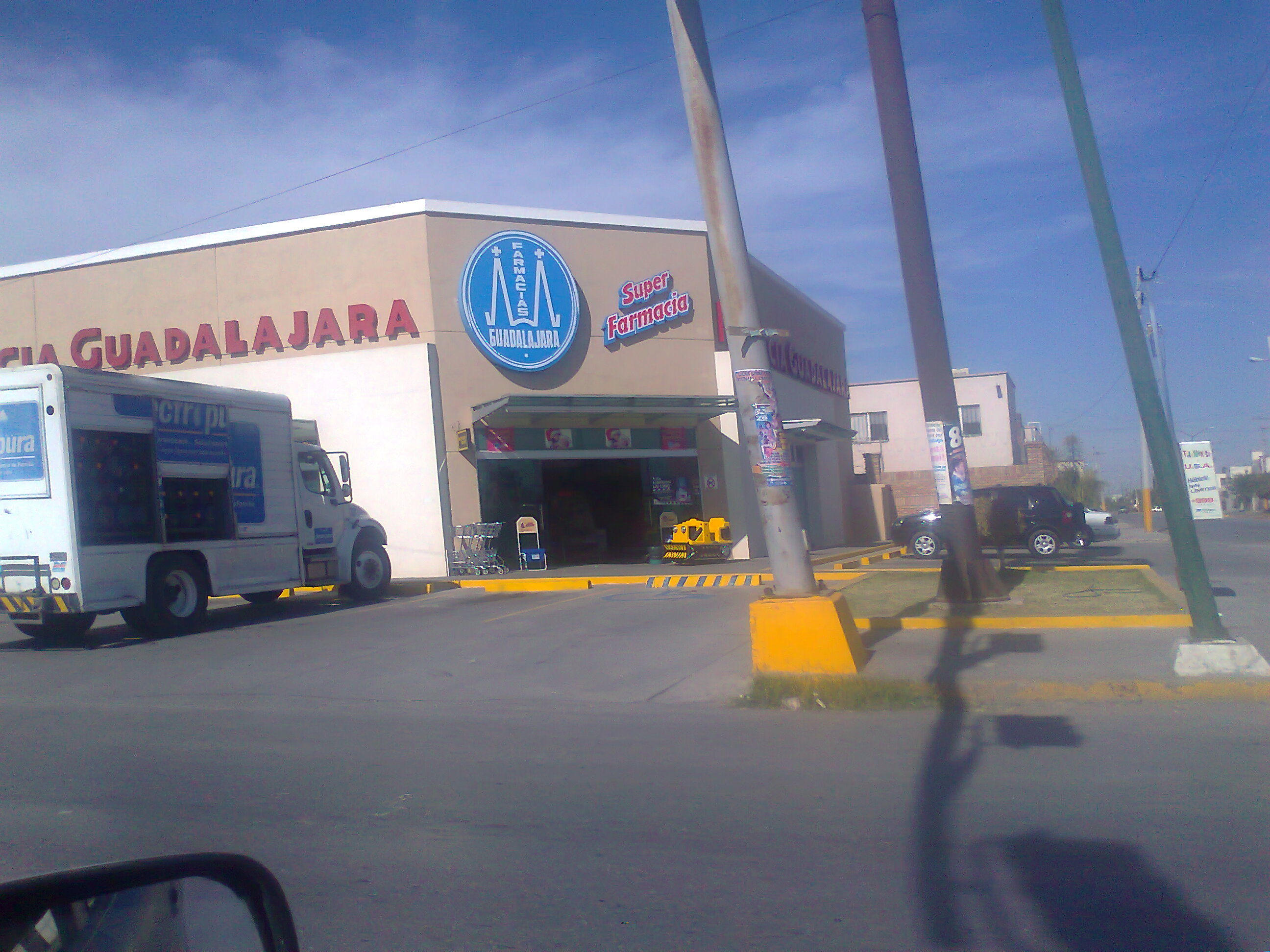
Farmacias Guadalajara typical branch.

Farmacias Guadalajara is a Mexican drugstore chain, that was founded in 1942 in Guadalajara, Jalisco. In 1962 it began an expansion program, and currently has more than 1725 drugstores in 19 States. It is one of only 3 businesses from Jalisco to be listed on the Mexican stock market. The name of this business in the Mexican Stock Market is Fragua.

Since 2004, it has increased its stores to more than 60 locations per year and has an average of 2 locations opening per week. Currently Farmacias Guadalajara has more than 15,000 employees. In the middle of 2008, Farmacias Guadalajara opened a new distribution center with high tech in Monterrey, that provides merchandise to the whole chain. The chain has its own brand for things like chips, bottled water, snacks, iced tea, etc. The pharmacy offers many other services like taking photos for IDs and printing photos from your personal camera. They have an association with Pan Bueno that they make bread in every store. The Farmacias Guadalajara headquarters are located in downtown Guadalajara, and they have 3 distribution centers around the country.
