= Progreso =

Progreso or Progresso (Spanish, Portuguese and Italian for "Progress") may refer to:

== Places ==
=== Angola ===
- Progresso, Belas, Luanda, Angola

=== Argentina ===
- Progreso, Argentina

=== Belize ===
- Progresso, Belize, village in the Corozal District

=== Bolivia ===
- Progreso Airport

=== Guatemala ===
- El Progreso Department, smallest department in population, whose capital is Guastatoya
- El Progreso, Jutiapa, municipality in the Jutiapa department
- Nuevo Progreso, San Marcos, municipality in the San Marcos department

=== Honduras ===
- El Progreso, Yoro, municipality in the department of Yoro

=== Mexico ===
- El Progreso, Tamaulipas, community in the Nuevo Laredo municipality
- Progreso, Baja California
- Progreso, Coahuila
- Progreso, Hidalgo
- Progreso, Yucatán, port city in the state of Yucatán
- Nuevo Progreso, Río Bravo, Tamaulipas
- Progreso (municipality of Coahuila)
- Cuetzala del Progreso
- Jaral del Progreso
- Tamazulapam del Progreso
- Plaza Nuevo Progreso, bullring in Guadalajara, Jalisco
- Progreso Industrial

=== Panama ===
- Progreso, Chiriquí

=== Peru ===
- Progreso District

=== Spain ===
- Barrio del Progreso

=== United States ===
- Progreso, Texas, city in Hidalgo County
  - Progreso Independent School District, public school district in Progreso, Texas, USA
- Progreso Lakes, Texas, city in Hidalgo County

=== Uruguay ===
- Progreso, Uruguay, city and municipality in the Canelones Department

== Politics ==
- Democratic Party for Progress – Angolan National Alliance (Partido Democrático para o Progresso), political party in Angola
- National Union for Democracy and Progress (São Tomé and Príncipe) (União Nacional para a Democracia e Progresso), political party in São Tomé and Príncipe
- People's Party of Progress (Partido Popular do Progresso), political party in São Tomé and Príncipe
- Union for Promoting Progress (União Promotora para o Progresso), political party in the Chinese Special Administrative Region of Macau
- National Union for Democracy and Progress (Guinea-Bissau) (União Nacional para a Democracia e o Progresso), political party in Guinea-Bissau

== Sports ==
- C. A. Progreso, football club in Montevideo, Uruguay
- C.D. Honduras Progreso, a Honduran football club
- Progresso Associação do Sambizanga, Angolan football club
- Sport Progreso, a Peruvian football club

== Media ==
- Progreso, journal for the constructed language Ido
- El Progreso (Spain), newspaper from Lugo, Galicia, Spain
- El Progreso (Venezuela), newspaper from Ciudad Bolivar, Venezuela

== Other ==
- Progresso, Italian food manufacturer
- Progresso pencil, a brand of woodless coloring pencils manufactured by Koh-i-Noor Hardtmuth
- Progresso Spacecraft, a planned crewed space vehicle by the Brazilian Space Agency
- Banco del Progreso
- Club del Progreso, an aristocratic club of Buenos Aires
- Egipcia Progreso, a typeface
- Radio Progreso, a Cuban Spanish language radio station

== See also ==
- Nuevo Progreso (disambiguation)
