= Nuevo Progreso =

Nuevo Progreso may refer to the following places:

- Nuevo Progreso, San Marcos, Guatemala
- Nuevo Progreso, Nuevo Laredo, Tamaulipas, Mexico
- Nuevo Progreso, Río Bravo, Tamaulipas, Mexico
- Nuevo Progreso District, Tocache, Peru

== See also ==
- Plaza Nuevo Progreso, bullring in Guadalajara, Jalisco, Mexico
