= Nancy Obregón =

Peruvian politician (born 1970)

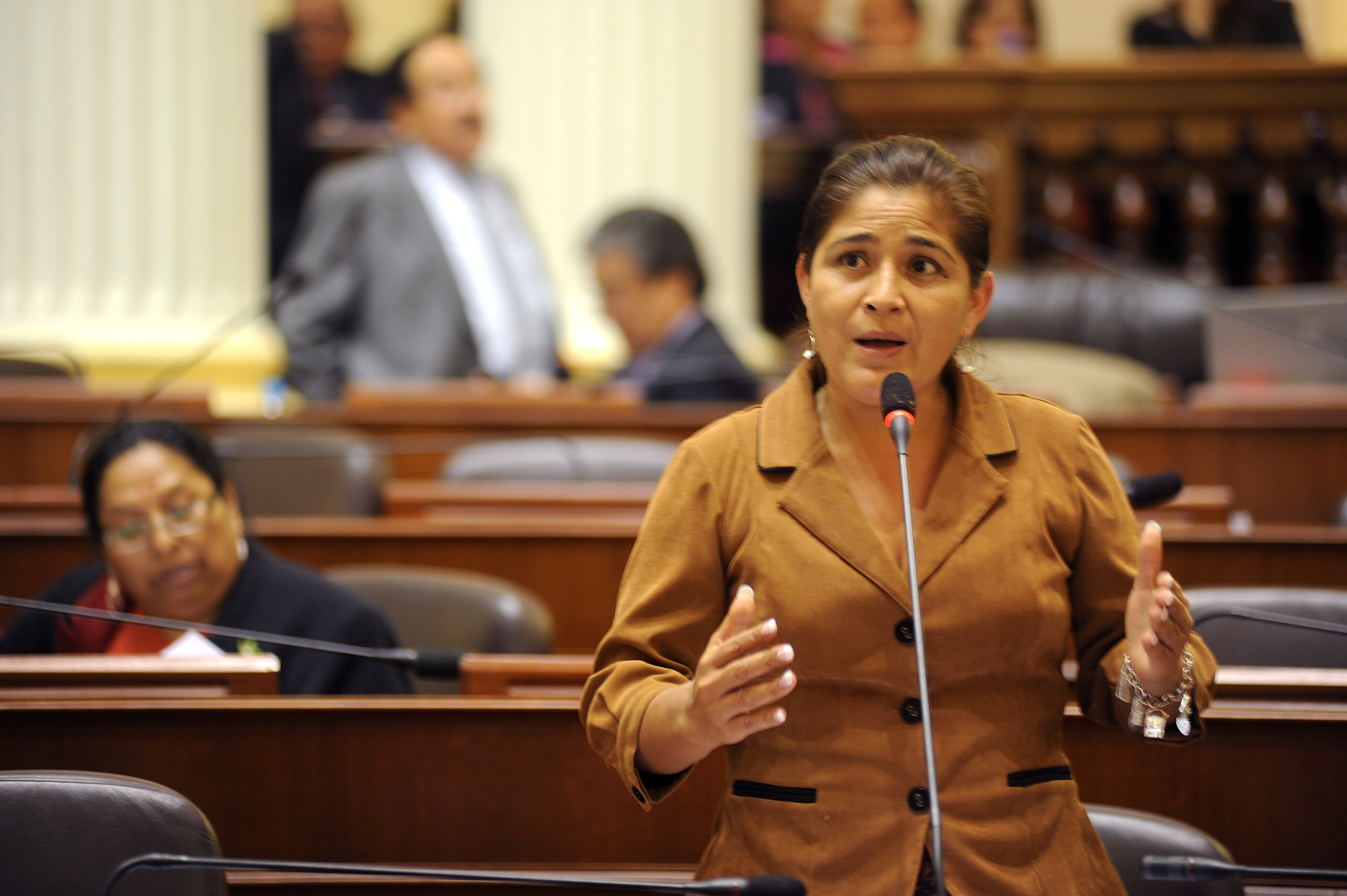
Nancy Obregón (2011)

Nancy Rufina Obregón Peralta (born 6 January 1970) is a Peruvian cocalero activist and former congresswoman who represented San Martín for the 2006–2011 term.

== Biography ==
Obregón earned a degree in parliamentary management from Ricardo Palma University. She participated in roundtables under the governments of Alberto Fujimori, Valentín Paniagua, Alejandro Toledo, and Alan García.

== Political career ==
She first ran for office in 1998 in an effort to represent Pólvora District as part of the We Are Peru party, though she was not elected. She ran for city council in Tocache in 2002 as a member of Nueva Amazonia, but lost again.

In 2006, she was elected to Congress representing San Martín with the Peruvian Nationalist Party, led by Ollanta Humala.

=== Arrest ===
In 2013, Obregón was questioned under suspicion of having ties with drug trafficking and the Shining Path. She was subsequently arrested along with Elsa Malpartida, having been accused by the Public Ministry of coordinating with cocaleros to support the Shining Path. She was sentenced for drug trafficking and financing terrorism. She was imprisoned at Santa Mónica Prison, but was released in 2016 for excessive detention. f
