= La Reforma, San Marcos =

La Reforma
- Location in San Marcos Department, Guatemala La Reforma (Guatemala)
- Coordinates: 14°48′07″N 91°49′24″W
- Country: Guatemala
- Department: San Marcos

Government
  - Mayor (2016-2020): Aroldo Santiago Morales (Partido Patriota)

Population (2018)
  - Total: 22,689
- Climate: Am

La Reforma is a municipality in the San Marcos department of Guatemala. The population is mostly indigenous-Mam and they speak their own language and Spanish also. The Catholic Church and the local precolonial religious practices exist together. Coffee is the main source of income.

== History ==
La Reforma, Caserío was a San Marcos Department settlement under San Cristóbal Cucho municipality jurisdiction. The main landowner was Mariano Maldonado, who harvested coffee, sugar cane and had some cattle. Back then, there were only nineteen inhabitants. On 31 October 1880, a census made by the Guatemalan government does not show La Reforma; it only talks about San Cristóbal Cucho, which had a small city and thirteen rural settlements. (Note: San Cristóbal Cucho villages and settlements in 1880: Villages: Sintaná, Rancho Bojon, Cillen, Matasano, Tierra Colorada, Bocol, Chisná Grande, Chibuj, Oná, Chiquilá, Las Majadas, Guativil, Rancho del Padre, e Ixcananté; Rural settlements: Cangutz, Naranjo, Plante, Jajaguaguche, Tujum, Chiguatán, Olimpo, Medellín, Zapote, Puntarenas, Culvil, La Unión, La Consquista, El Paraíso, San Narciso, La Igualdad, Guadalimar, Nueva América, Armenia y Suiza.)

In 1893, La Reforma was still a village of San Cristóbal Cucho, and in the 1921 census is shown with 6.125 inhabitants, 3.144 male and 2.981 female. The population realized that it was time to set their own municipality to address their basic need and finally were able to create in 1988. The named it "La Reforma" after general Justo Rufino Barrios, the Reformer, who was born in San Marcos Department.

=== "La Inmaculada Concepción" parish ===
"La Inmaculada Concepción" (English:The Immaculate Conception") parish in La Reforma municipality was founded on 1 January 1956 and originally served both La Reforma and El Quetzal municipalities. Its first priest was father Jaime López, a Franciscan, who led the parish until 5 March 1958. His successor was father Juan Bartolomé Bueno, who was in charge until 31 July 1960, when father Pedro López Nadal, from Spain, took charge. On 23 April 1961, church construction was completed and it was opened and blessed by San Marcos dioceses Bishop, Celestino Fernández. Father López Nadal led the parish until 25 January 1964, when father Juan Van Der Vaeren took his place. In 1965, El Quetzal was elevated to parish and had its own priest, leaving La Reforma. Between 1967 and 1968, fathers Jorge Helin, Domingo Ezcurra and Bishop Próspero Penados —San Marcos auxiliary Bishop and eventual Guatemala Archbishop—, took care of the parish; however, on 25 August 1968 father Francisco Herrero Sánchez was appointed and he was in charge of the parish for more than twenty years.

=== Brief historic description of La Reforma communities ===
Brief historic description of La Reforma communities
Name	Extension (in km^{2})	Border	Population	History
Aldea Santa Clara	3.90		N/A	The founding date of Santa Clara cannot be accurately said because this region used to be part of San Antonio Sacatepéquez, which in turn belonged to the Department of Quetzaltenango. When La Reforma was established as municipality in 1988, it obtained Santa Clara, which possibly was land from San José La Providencia.
Aldea San Rafael Bocol	3.20		474	In 1942 its people added "San Rafael" to its name, thus becoming "San Rafael Bocol" after Rafaela Calderon, a distinguished citizen.
Caserío La Esperanza	2		575	It originally was part of Santa Clara. The land was donated by Emilio González and Hugo Mérida to build what became the center of the settlement; both of them also sold their land to buyer from outside the original settlement and in 1957 La Esperanza separated from Santa Clara. Its name comes from the Santa Clara celebration in honor of Jesus of the Good Hope (Spanish:Jesús de la Buena Esperanza). Their annual fair is celebrated during Holy Week.
Caserío Punta Arenas	1		456	Punta Arenas was an hacienda owned by Víctor Pérez, from Huehuetenango; the farm land bordered another one called Socorro hacienda, of Mariano Pérez. Both owners bequeathed their land and their successors decided to split it in small lots, thus founding Punta Arenas.
Caserío Los Ochoa	1.09		540	The area were Los Ochoa stands used to be the "San Antonio Las Flores" hacienda, which belonged to brothers Bonifacio and Víctor María Ochoa Barrios, we were originally from San Lorenzo; each one of them had eight children, and therefore, their large family transformed the former hacienda into a small rural settlement.
Recuerdo Asturias	1		446	The area where Recuerdo Asturias stands used to be part of Concepción Candelaria hacienda, owned by Cuban citizen Stuardo Samayoa Brahaman. During the presidency of colonel Jacobo Árbenz Guzmán, and after the Agrarian Reform issued by this president, Concepción Candelaria became a national hacienda, and was completely split in small lots. After Operation PBSuccess in 1954, the new government led by colonel Carlos Castillo Armas transferred Concepción Candelaria to the National Bank; Francisco Asturias, both part of the hacienda from the bank in order to sell small lots to his workers at a reasonable price. The new inhabitants named the settlement Recuerdo Asturias in honor to their former employer.
Caserío Villa Hermosa	0.339		439	In the 28 August 1921 government census, Villa Hermosa hacienda appears as dedicated to sugar cane and coffee plantations. Its former owner, Guillermo Rodas, left in his will that Alejandro Barrios was to split 776 small lots.
Caserío Santa Teresa	0.45		678	In the 28 August 1921 Guatemalan government census, Santa Teresa hacienda showed 34 inhabitants; and the census made by La Reforma authorities on 15 January 1925 showed 35. The land originally belonged to Inés P. de Ramírez, and after several sales it became property of Walter Hanstein, who already owner La Paz hacienda, to which Santa Teresa was annexed. After Hanstein retirement, his offspring split Santa Teresa into small lots for the former workers of his father's haciendas.
Parcelamiento Natividad de María	1.36		879	Natividad de María came of a section that separated from the "Dos Marías" hacienda. Each one of the 104 families that received their land on 4 December 1956 paid Q.1,040.00, in yearly payments of Q.104.00 each. Those who got land in Natividad were former workers of the "Dos Marías" hacienda.
Cantón San Isidro	2		663	San Isidro belonged to Santa Clara village, but came of it in 1981 when the population was large enough. The land was owned by Marcelino Velásquez, who also donated a sculpture of San Isidro. It celebrates its annual fair between December 2 and 6.

== Climate ==
La Reforma has tropical climate (Köppen: Am).

Climate data for La Reforma
Month	Jan	Feb	Mar	Apr	May	Jun	Jul	Aug	Sep	Oct	Nov	Dec	Year
Mean daily maximum °C (°F)	28.7 (83.7)	28.6 (83.5)	29.5 (85.1)	29.3 (84.7)	29.0 (84.2)	27.7 (81.9)	28.3 (82.9)	28.7 (83.7)	28.0 (82.4)	28.2 (82.8)	28.4 (83.1)	28.8 (83.8)	28.6 (83.5)
Daily mean °C (°F)	22.5 (72.5)	22.5 (72.5)	23.1 (73.6)	23.3 (73.9)	23.4 (74.1)	22.5 (72.5)	22.7 (72.9)	23.1 (73.6)	22.6 (72.7)	22.9 (73.2)	22.8 (73.0)	22.8 (73.0)	22.8 (73.1)
Mean daily minimum °C (°F)	16.3 (61.3)	16.5 (61.7)	16.8 (62.2)	17.4 (63.3)	17.8 (64.0)	17.4 (63.3)	17.2 (63.0)	17.5 (63.5)	17.3 (63.1)	17.6 (63.7)	17.2 (63.0)	16.8 (62.2)	17.2 (62.9)
Average precipitation mm (inches)	32 (1.3)	44 (1.7)	91 (3.6)	186 (7.3)	454 (17.9)	635 (25.0)	495 (19.5)	480 (18.9)	673 (26.5)	558 (22.0)	163 (6.4)	57 (2.2)	3,868 (152.3)
Source: Climate-Data.org

== Geographic location ==
La Reforma is completely surrounded by San Marcos Department municipalities and has an area of 60 km^{2}.

=== Distances to other settlements ===
Distances to other locations
Location	Name	Distance (in km)
Municipality	San Marcos	43
Municipality	Coatepeque	24
Municipality	El Quetzal	15
Municipality	Nuevo Progreso	31
Municipality	San Cristóbal Cucho	25
Village	Santa Clara	22
Village	San Rafael Bocol	8
Settlement	La Esperanza	15
Settlement	Punta Arenas	2
Settlement	Los Ochoa	16
Settlement	Recuerdo Asturias	8
Settlement	Villa Hermosa	4

== See also ==
- La Aurora International Airport
- Tapachula International Airport
