= Progreso Lakes, Texas =

- City
- City of Progreso Lakes
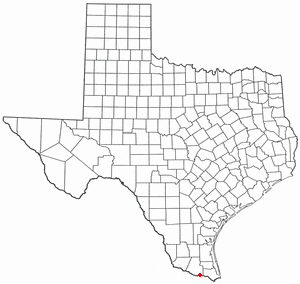
- Location of Progreso Lakes, Texas

- Coordinates: 26°4′24″N 97°57′41″W
- Country: United States of America
- State: Texas
- County: Hidalgo

Area
  - Total: 2.19 sq mi (5.67 km^{2})
  - Land: 2.10 sq mi (5.43 km^{2})
  - Water: 0.093 sq mi (0.24 km^{2})
- Elevation: 75 ft (23 m)

Population (2020)
  - Total: 257
  - Density: 138.8/sq mi (53.58/km^{2})
- Time zone: UTC-6 (Central (CST))
  - Summer (DST): UTC-5 (CDT)
- ZIP code: 78596
- Area code: 956
- FIPS code: 48-59642
- GNIS feature ID: 1388613

Progreso Lakes is a city in Hidalgo County, Texas, United States. As of the 2020 census, Progreso Lakes had a population of 257. The city, incorporated in 1979, is centered on Lion and Moon Lakes, two resacas or ox-bow lakes.

Progreso Lakes is part of the McAllen–Edinburg–Mission and Reynosa–McAllen metropolitan areas. In addition, it shares the U.S.-Mexico border with the city of Nuevo Progreso, Tamaulipas.

== Geography ==
Progreso Lakes is situated along FM 1015 in southern Hidalgo County, approximately two miles south of Progreso and six miles south of Weslaco.

According to the United States Census Bureau, the city has a total area of 2.2 square miles (5.7 km^{2}), of which 2.1 square miles (5.4 km^{2}) is land and 0.1 square miles (0.26 km^{2}) (4.11%) is water.

The Progreso-Nuevo Progreso International Bridge over the Rio Grande connects the city with Nuevo Progreso, Tamaulipas in Mexico.

== Demographics ==
Historical population
Census	Pop.	Note	%±
1980	197		—
1990	154		−21.8%
2000	234		51.9%
2010	240		2.6%
2020	257		7.1%
U.S. Decennial Census

=== 2020 census ===
As of the 2020 census, there were 257 people, 91 households, and 79 families residing in the city. The median age was 40.4 years. 22.2% of residents were under the age of 18 and 17.9% of residents were 65 years of age or older. For every 100 females there were 131.5 males, and for every 100 females age 18 and over there were 122.2 males.

Of the 91 households, 46.2% had children under the age of 18 living in them. Of all households, 60.4% were married-couple households, 19.8% were households with a male householder and no spouse or partner present, and 16.5% were households with a female householder and no spouse or partner present. About 11.0% of all households were made up of individuals and 6.6% had someone living alone who was 65 years of age or older.

There were 97 housing units, of which 6.2% were vacant. The homeowner vacancy rate was 2.3% and the rental vacancy rate was 0.0%. 0.0% of residents lived in urban areas, while 100.0% lived in rural areas.

Racial composition as of the 2020 census
Race	Number	Percent
White	122	47.5%
Black or African American	2	0.8%
American Indian and Alaska Native	1	0.4%
Asian	6	2.3%
Native Hawaiian and Other Pacific Islander	0	0.0%
Some other race	24	9.3%
Two or more races	102	39.7%
Hispanic or Latino (of any race)	180	70.0%

=== 2000 census ===
As of the 2000 census, there were 234 people, 83 households, and 68 families residing in the city. The population density was 111.4 inhabitants per square mile (43.0/km^{2}). There were 88 housing units at an average density of 41.9 per square mile (16.2/km^{2}). The racial makeup of the city was 97.86% White, 0.43% Asian, 1.71% from other races. Hispanic or Latino of any race were 39.74% of the population.

There were 83 households, out of which 33.7% had children under the age of 18 living with them, 73.5% were married couples living together, 6.0% had a female householder with no husband present, and 16.9% were non-families. 13.3% of all households were made up of individuals, and 4.8% had someone living alone who was 65 years of age or older. The average household size was 2.82 and the average family size was 3.13.

In the city, the population was spread out, with 24.8% under the age of 18, 5.6% from 18 to 24, 23.9% from 25 to 44, 27.4% from 45 to 64, and 18.4% who were 65 years of age or older. The median age was 43 years. For every 100 females, there were 95.0 males. For every 100 females age 18 and over, there were 91.3 males.

The median income for a household in the city was $68,125, and the median income for a family was $72,500. Males had a median income of $55,417 versus $28,125 for females. The per capita income for the city was $24,029. About 4.3% of families and 4.2% of the population were below the poverty line, including 3.3% of those under the age of eighteen and 8.1% of those 65 or over.

== Education ==
Progreso Lakes is served by the Progreso Independent School District.

In addition, South Texas Independent School District operates magnet schools that serve the community.
