= América II, Tamaulipas =

Coordinates: 27°19′34″N 99°34′07″W

América
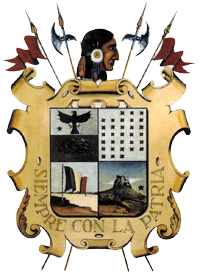
- Seal

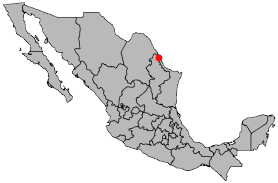
- Country: Mexico
- State: Tamaulipas
- Municipality: Nuevo Laredo
- Elevation: 135 m (443 ft)

Population (2010)
  - Total: 197
- Time zone: UTC-6 (CST)
  - Summer (DST): UTC-5 (CST)
- Codigo Postal: 88000
- Area code: +52-867
- Nearest Airports: Laredo: Laredo International Airport KLRD LRD Nuevo Laredo: Quetzalcoatl International Airport MMNL NLD

América is a community located in Nuevo Laredo Municipality in the Mexican state of Tamaulipas. According to the INEGI Census of 2010, América has a population of 197 inhabitants. Its elevation is 135 meters above sea level. It is the second locality of the same name in the municipality, the other is América, which lies just to the west, across Mexican Federal Highway 85.

== See also ==
América, Tamaulipas
