= Progreso Municipality =

Progreso Municipality may refer to:

- Progreso Municipality, Coahuila, a municipality in the state of Coahuila, Mexico
- Progreso Municipality, Yucatán, a municipality in the state of Yucatán, Mexico
