= Third Battle of Torreón =

1916 military engagement during the Mexican Revolution

- Part of Mexican Revolution
Date	December 21-23, 1916
Location	Torreón, Coahuila 25°32′0″N 103°26′0″W
Result	Villista victory

Belligerents
Conventionists: División del Norte	Government: Constitutional Army

Commanders and leaders
Pancho Villa	Severiano Talamantes; Fortunato Maycotte; Juan Gualberto Amaya

Strength
2,500–3,000	4,000

The Third Battle of Torreón from December 21 to 23, 1916, was one of the battles of the Mexican Revolution, where troops led by Pancho Villa occupied the city, protected by Carrancist forces.

== Background ==
The 1916 history of the revolution in Northern Mexico was characterized by the fact that Pancho Villa, which had been constantly migrating in and around Chihuahua, and his smaller and larger troops, gathered and disbanded, fought a number of smaller battles with Carrancist soldiers. The Villistas reaped one of their biggest victories in late November when they managed to occupy Chihuahua City.

It was not long before they were able to celebrate the victory: Francisco Murguía and his 16,000 men, complete with thousands more soldiers, slowly moved north from Torreón to Chihuahua. Villa perceived the enormous superiority, so he did not undertake the clash, but rather evacuated his troops and loot from the settlement, where Murguía was thus able to enter undisturbed on December 4. The Villista's plan was to "exchange" the lost Chihuahua for the almost unguarded (at least much less protected) Torreón, so they headed south. Along the way, they took Camargo and Parral, looted several trains, and the army continued to expand. Around December 20, 2,500 to 3,000 people arrived in Torreón.

== The battle ==
The Villistas approached Gómez Palació, adjacent to Torreón, through Bermejillo, where a Carrancist brigade named Luis Herrera Juárez was stationed, but they were instructed to march into Torreón. Thus, the city was defended by a total of about 4,000 and had only a few cannons. Severiano Talamantes distributed the infantry around the city while Fortunato Maycotte tried to encircle the attackers with his cavalry, but Lorenzo Ávalos' units forced them back into the city.

The attack began at 5 a.m. on December 21. Nicolás Fernández launched an attack on the right side of the railway and occupied the peaks of Calabazas and La Polvareda as Baudelio Uribe pushed forward in the middle. Here, however, he met with fierce resistance, killing about 50 men, including Pancho Villa's brother-in-law Juan Martínez, as well as shooting Uribe's horse. The Villistas also attacked on a third front: Eligio Reyes reached the city from the south, from the direction of the plain called El Pajonas, and approached the Alameda.

On December 22, the defenders launched a counterattack in the direction of Calabazas. The Villista José María Jaurrietta rode to the scene with four of his companions (while they were being cannoned while passing through a flat area) and, with his personal presence, managed to stop the beginning dispersal and escape of the warriors there. Leaving Fernández then, he himself returned to Gómez Palació and waited for the next day, when he planned a final attack. In the evening, Talamantes and Maycotte believed that, as usual, Villa would attack at night, but this was not the case.

The last attack began at 8 a.m. on December 23, after some of Maycotte's riders had already fled the city. Talamantes decided to withdraw from Torreón, he himself was one of the last to leave the town. By 10 o'clock the Villista's victory was complete. During the battle, General Carlos Martínez was killed among the defenders, as was Luis Herrera in the fighting around Alameda.

== Aftermath ==
Herrera's body was taken by his own men, according to various sources, to either a hotel called France or Iberia, where after the battle the Villistas found it and then hung it on a tree or column near the train station at Eulogio Ortiz's disposal. According to one description, a Villista recounted that an image of Venustiano Carranza was placed in the slit of the corpse's trousers and Carrancist banknotes in his hand. The body of General Martínez was also found, but it was not dishonored.

The fleeing defenders in the mountains south of the city left some Kiikaapoa warriors in their holes dug into the ground, serving as a kind of trench. To them, Villa sent some of his own people of Kiikaapoa descent there and convinced them to descend into the city. There he disarmed them.

Unlike many previous battles, most of the hundreds of prisoners of war were not executed this time, but based on the idea of Baudelio Uribe, their ears were cut off, especially those who had previously been Villistas but switched to the opposing side. Among the prisoners was a farmer named Jesús Salas Barraza, who either Villa himself or one of his men wanted to shoot to death, but the bullet that pierced his head did not kill him. The bleeding man lying on the ground was believed to be dead and left behind. This scene is important because more than 6 years later, Barraza was one of the participants in Villa's murder.

The victors were only partially satisfied with the loot: although they obtained plenty of gold and silver, they found less ammunition, which was already in short supply, than was consumed during the battle. Villa called together the city's wealthy craftsmen, merchants, and farmers and demanded 2 million pesos of military loans from them, of which he was eventually able to recover 1 million. He also collected 100,000 pesos from a special tax on local Spanish, German and French residents.

Two days after the battle, Talamantes, one of the leaders of the losing Carrancists, committed suicide on the road to Saltillo at Enconada train station.

== Bibliography ==
- Taibo, Paco Ignacio (2007). Pancho Villa: Una biografía narrativa (in Spanish) (1st ed.). Barcelona: Editorial Planeta. ISBN 9788408073147. OCLC 433362298.
