= Morelos, Tamaulipas =

Morelos El Estero
- Community
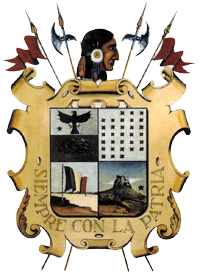
- Seal

- Location within Mexico
- Coordinates: 27°28′00″N 99°38′59″W
- Country: Mexico
- State: Tamaulipas
- Municipality: Nuevo Laredo Municipality
- Elevation: 164 m (538 ft)

Population (2010)
  - Total: 96
- Time zone: UTC-6 (CST)
  - Summer (DST): UTC-5 (CST)
- Codigo Postal: 88000
- Area code: +52-867
- Nearest Airports: Laredo: Laredo International Airport KLRD LRD Nuevo Laredo: Quetzalcoatl International Airport MMNL NLD

Morelos also known as El Estero is a community located in Nuevo Laredo Municipality in the Mexican state of Tamaulipas. According to the INEGI Census of 2010, Morelos has a population of 96 inhabitants, 54 males and 42 females. Its elevation is 164 meters above sea level.
