= Tocache province =

Coordinates: 8°11′20″S 76°30′57″W

Tocache
- Province
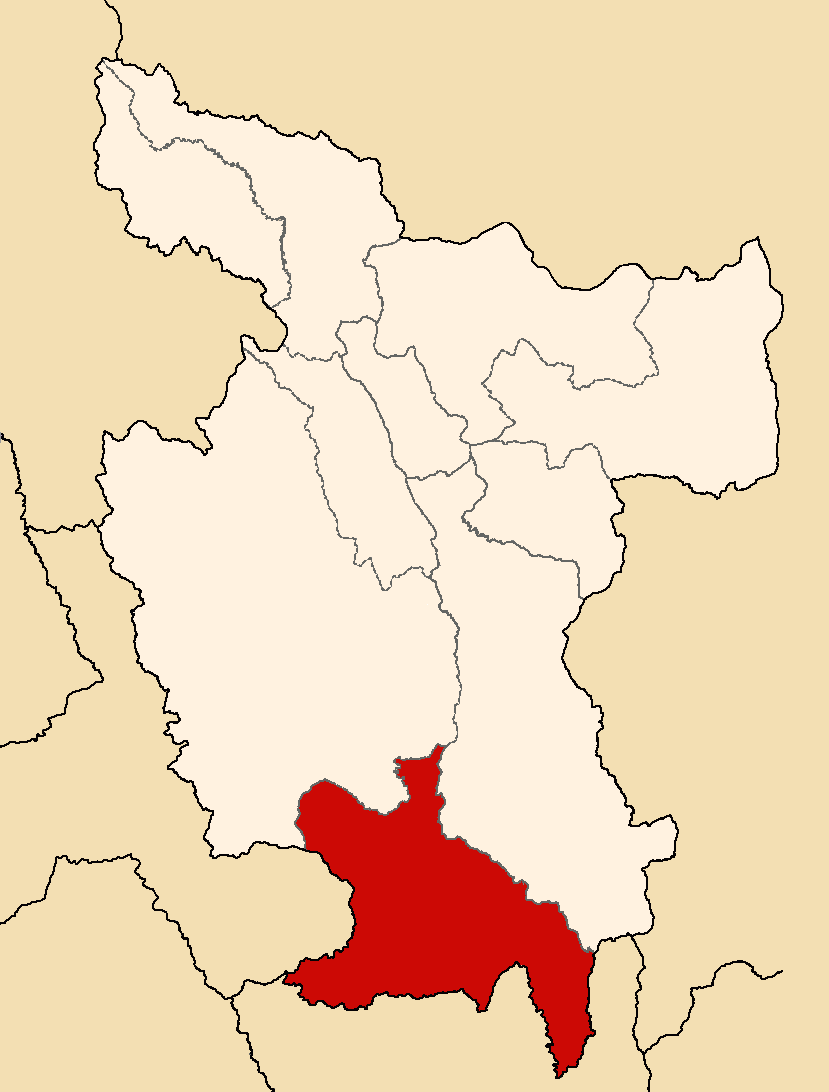
- Location of Tocache in the San Martín Region
- Country: Peru
- Region: San Martín
- Capital: Tocache

Area
  - Total: 5,865.44 km^{2} (2,264.66 sq mi)

Population
  - Total: 98.265
  - Density: 16.75/km^{2} (43.4/sq mi)
- UBIGEO: 2210

Tocache is one of 10 provinces of the San Martín Region in northern Peru.

== History ==
The province of Tocache was created by Law Dec 6, 1984, in Fernando Belaúnde's term.

== Boundaries ==
- North: province of Mariscal Cáceres
- East: province of Bellavista
- South: Huánuco Region
- West: Ancash Region

== Political division ==
The province is divided into five districts.

- Nuevo Progreso (Nuevo Progreso)
- Pólvora (Pólvora)
- Shunte (Tambo de Paja)
- Tocache (Tocache)
- Uchiza (Uchiza)

== Mayors ==
- 2011-2014: Corina De La Cruz Yupanqui, Despertar Nacional.
- 2007-2010: David Bazán Arévalo, Movimiento Regional Nueva Amazonía.
- 2003-2006: Pedro Bogarin Vargas, Lista Independiente.
- 1999-2002: Tadeo Rengifo Arévalo, Acción Popular.
