= El Quetzal =

- Municipality
- Location in Guatemala
- Coordinates: 14°46′00″N 91°49′00″W
- Country: Guatemala
- Department: San Marcos

Government
  - Mayor: Ricardo Velásquez (Partido Patriota)

Area
  - Municipality: 68.5 km^{2} (26.4 sq mi)

Population (2018 census)
  - Municipality: 23,511
  - Density: 343/km^{2} (889/sq mi)
  - Urban: 10,513
- Climate: Am

El Quetzal (Spanish pronunciation: [el ketˈsal]) is a town and municipality in the San Marcos department of Guatemala. It was recognised as municipality on 19 June 1900. The major source of income is the agriculture.

== "La Inmaculada Concepción" parish ==
"La Inmaculada Concepción" (English:The Immaculate Conception") parish in La Reforma municipality was founded on 1 January 1956 and originally served both La Reforma and El Quetzal municipalities. Its first priest was father Jaime López, a Franciscan, who led the parish until 5 March 1958. His successor was father Juan Bartolomé Bueno, who was in charge until 31 July 1960, when father Pedro López Nadal, from Spain, took charge. On 23 April 1961, church construction was completed and it was opened and blessed by San Marcos dioceses Bishop, Celestino Fernández. Father López Nadal led the parish until 25 January 1964, when father Juan Van Der Vaeren took his place. In 1965, El Quetzal was elevated to parish and had its own priest, leaving La Reforma.

== Climate ==
El Quetzal has tropical monsoon climate (Köppen: Am).

Climate data for La Reforma
Month	Jan	Feb	Mar	Apr	May	Jun	Jul	Aug	Sep	Oct	Nov	Dec	Year
Mean daily maximum °C (°F)	28.8 (83.8)	29.1 (84.4)	30.0 (86.0)	30.0 (86.0)	29.8 (85.6)	28.2 (82.8)	29.0 (84.2)	29.3 (84.7)	28.5 (83.3)	28.3 (82.9)	28.7 (83.7)	28.7 (83.7)	29.0 (84.3)
Daily mean °C (°F)	22.8 (73.0)	23.0 (73.4)	23.8 (74.8)	24.2 (75.6)	24.3 (75.7)	23.2 (73.8)	23.6 (74.5)	23.8 (74.8)	23.5 (74.3)	23.2 (73.8)	23.3 (73.9)	22.9 (73.2)	23.5 (74.2)
Mean daily minimum °C (°F)	16.8 (62.2)	17.0 (62.6)	17.7 (63.9)	18.5 (65.3)	18.8 (65.8)	18.3 (64.9)	18.2 (64.8)	18.4 (65.1)	18.5 (65.3)	18.2 (64.8)	17.9 (64.2)	17.2 (63.0)	18.0 (64.3)
Average precipitation mm (inches)	34 (1.3)	43 (1.7)	96 (3.8)	228 (9.0)	469 (18.5)	668 (26.3)	544 (21.4)	592 (23.3)	737 (29.0)	673 (26.5)	194 (7.6)	66 (2.6)	4,344 (171)
Source: Climate-Data.org

== See also ==
- La Aurora International Airport
- Tapachula International Airport
