= Oradel Industrial Center =

Industrial zone in Nuevo Laredo, TM, Mexico

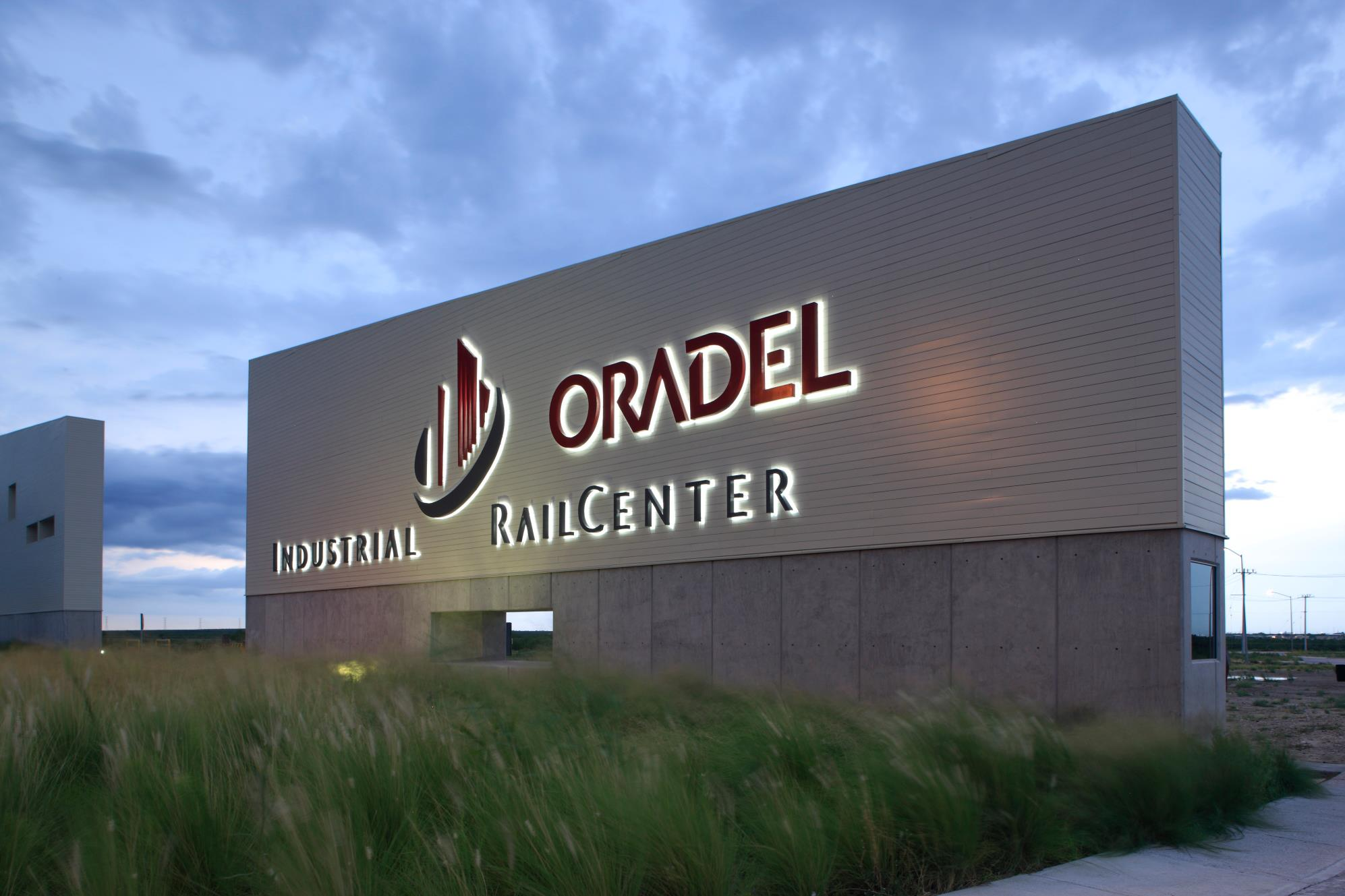
Oradel

Information
Name	Oradel Industrial Center.
Inauguration	July 2000
Address	Blvd. World Trade Center 101 Pte., Oradel Industrial Park (Oradel Industrial Center), ZIP: 88285. Nuevo Laredo, Tamaulipas, Mexico.
Coordinates	27°28'48.4"N 99°37'20.6"W
Extension	2,965 Acres
Construction area	3,424,807 ft²

Oradel Industrial Center is located in the city of Nuevo Laredo, Tamaulipas, Mexico. It is an industrial zone funded in 2000 and located on the route that connects the East Zone of the United States with Mexico (11.99 miles away of the World Trade International Bridge).

Oradel Industrial Center was born from the union of three developers: Blokk Properties, Cargoquin Group and Mondlak Developments. Currently, the Industrial Center specializes in the development of industrial warehouses for manufacturing and storage warehouses for inventory and logistics and it has 14 buildings built.

== Infrastructure ==
Oradel has a total area of 1,200 hectares. Currently, it has 14 built industrial buildings, equivalent to 31.82 hectares. On the other hand, within the development is located "El Campanario and Oradel Village" (a complex of more than 5,000 homes of Infonavit.), the Technological University of Nuevo Laredo and "Un sólo Corazón", a daycare center of the IMSS.

The Industrial Park has a corporate government and an operational base of more than 30 people who are responsible for its maintenance.

In the Industrial Park a total of 12 tenant companies coexist, among them Rheem, Ezo Tube Solutions, Caterpillar, Medline Industries, Smurfit Kappa, Cryptex, Ravisa, PSC Maquiladora, Novamex, Remy International Inc., Cargoquin, and GST Autoleather (which has Seton Company Inc. as a subsidiary).
