= Nuevo Laredo Municipality =

Nuevo Laredo Municipality Municipio de Nuevo Laredo
- Municipality
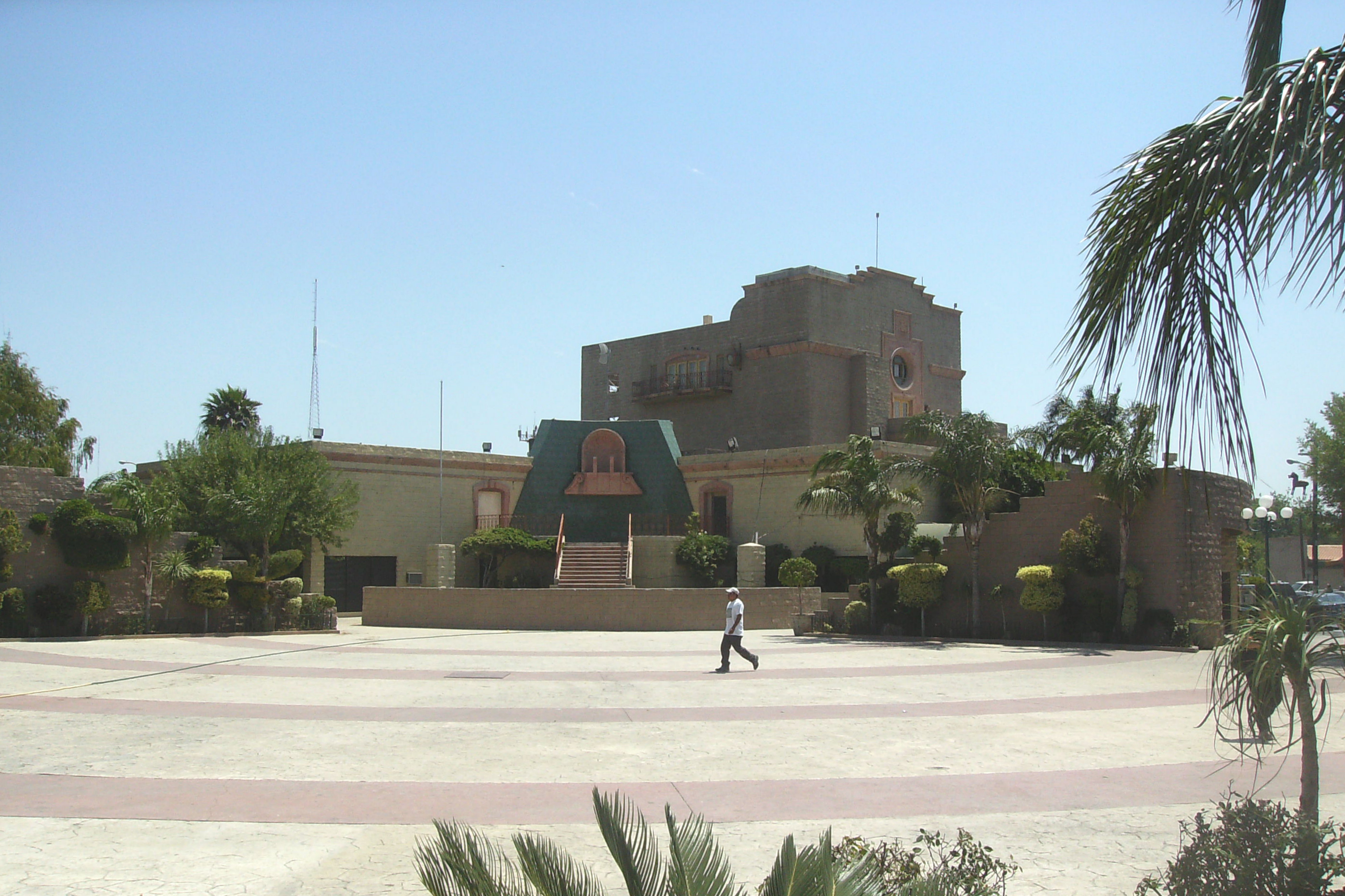
- Palomar building

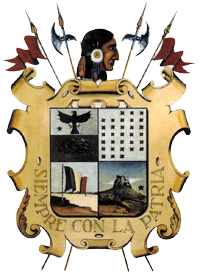
- Coat of arms
- Motto: Siempre Con La Patria
- Location of the Municipality of Nuevo Laredo in Tamaulipas
- Country: Mexico
- State: Tamaulipas
- Founded: 1825
- Seat: Nuevo Laredo
- Largest city: Nuevo Laredo

Government
  - President: Carmen Lilia Canturosas Villareal

Area
  - Municipality: 1,334.02 km^{2} (515.07 sq mi)

Population (2010 census)
  - Municipality: 384,033
  - Metro: 636,516
- Time zone: UTC–06:00 (Zona Centro)
  - Summer (DST): UTC–05:00 (DST)
- Codigo Postal: 88000
- Area code: 867
- Website: Municipio de Nuevo Laredo

The Municipality of Nuevo Laredo is located in the Mexican state of Tamaulipas. Its municipal seat is Nuevo Laredo. The municipality contains more than 60 localities, of which the most prominent are Nuevo Laredo, El Campanario y Oradel, and Álvarez, the last two being suburbs of the city of Nuevo Laredo. By population, the municipality is the third largest in the state of Tamaulipas (behind Reynosa and Matamoros respectively). The Nuevo Laredo municipality is the northernmost in Tamaulipas, lying at the extreme northwestern tip of its narrow strip of land along the Río Grande. The city of Nuevo Laredo contains approximately 97.5% of the total population of the municipality.

== Geography ==
Nuevo Laredo is located in the northern tip of Tamaulipas on the west end of the Rio Grande Plains. Rio Grande is the only source that supplies its citizens with water. El Coyote Creek supplies Nuevo Laredo's only natural lake El Laguito (The Small Lake). The area consists of a few hills and flat land covered with grass, oak, cacti, and mesquite.

=== Climate ===
Nuevo Laredo features a semiarid climate. Nuevo Laredo's weather is influenced by its proximity to the Chihuahuan Desert to the west, by the Sierra Madre Oriental mountains to the south and west, and by the Gulf of Mexico to the east. Much of the moisture from the Pacific is blocked by the Sierra Madre Oriental. Therefore, most of the moisture derives from the Gulf of Mexico. Its geographic location causes Nuevo Laredo's weather to range from long periods of heat to sudden violent storms in a short period of time. Nuevo Laredo is cold for Tamaulipas standards during winter, the average daytime highs are around 66 °F (19 C) and overnight lows around 43 °F (6 C); although it is rare for snow to fall in Nuevo Laredo, there was actually snow on the ground for a few hours on the morning of Christmas Day 2004.

Nuevo Laredo experiences an average high temperature of about 99 °F (37 C), and an average low of about 75 °F (24 C) during summer, and 20 inches (510 mm) of rain per year. As Laredo sometimes undergoes drought, a water conservation ordinance was implemented in 2003.

Climate data for Nuevo Laredo
Month	Jan	Feb	Mar	Apr	May	Jun	Jul	Aug	Sep	Oct	Nov	Dec	Year
Record high °F (°C)	92 (33)	94 (34)	99 (37)	108 (42)	112 (44)	112 (44)	111 (44)	112 (44)	109 (43)	101 (38)	99 (37)	93 (34)	104 (40)
Mean daily maximum °F (°C)	66 (19)	71 (22)	80 (27)	88 (31)	92 (33)	96 (36)	99 (37)	99 (37)	93 (34)	86 (30)	76 (25)	68 (20)	84 (29)
Mean daily minimum °F (°C)	43 (6)	47 (8)	55 (13)	63 (17)	69 (21)	73 (23)	75 (24)	75 (24)	74 (22)	63 (17)	53 (12)	45 (7)	61 (16)
Record low °F (°C)	26 (−3)	29 (−2)	33 (1)	38 (3)	54 (12)	66 (19)	68 (20)	64 (18)	56 (13)	42 (6)	33 (1)	15 (−9)	43.6 (7)
Average precipitation inches (cm)	1.0 (2.5)	1.1 (2.7)	0.8 (1.9)	1.8 (4.5)	2.6 (6.6)	3.2 (8.1)	1.5 (3.8)	2.7 (6.8)	3.1 (7.9)	2.5 (6.4)	1.2 (2.9)	0.9 (2.4)	22.2 (56.5)
Source: worldclimate.com

== Government ==
Nuevo Laredo is governed by an elected Cabildo, which is composed of the Presidente Municipal (Municipal President or Mayor), two Síndicos, and twenty Regidores. MORENA party is in control of the municipality government. The Mayor is in charge of the municipal administration. The Síndicos supervise the municipal budget and expenditures, and the Regidores are elected by the party.

=== Public safety ===
Public safety is provided by three municipal departments: (1) municipal police (Dirección de Seguridad Ciudadana), (2) traffic control (Dirección de Seguridad Vial), and (3) the emergency services department (Dirección de Protección Civil, Bomberos y Desastres).

== Towns and villages ==
The largest localities (cities, towns, and villages) are:

Name	2010 Census Population
Nuevo Laredo	373,725
El Campanario y Oradel	6,951
Bruno Álvarez Valdez	1,714
Nuevo Progreso (El Progreso)	432
América	255
América	197
La Cruz	159
Miguel Alemán	114
Morelos (El Estero)	96
La Esperanza	69
Los Artistas Segunda Etapa	54
other	267
Total Municipality	384,033

== Populated places ==
Census Code	Location	Coordinates	Total Population	Male	Female
0001	Nuevo Laredo	27°29′11″N 99°30′29″W	373,725	185,747	187,978
0097	Rancho Azul	27°34′28″N 99°42′24″W	1	*	*
0099	El Bayito	27°33′19″N 99°31′59″W	8	*	*
0103	Morelos (El Estero)	27°28′00″N 99°38′59″W	96	54	42
0105	La Cruz	27°34′24″N 99°35′45″W	159	81	78
0108	La Esperanza	27°21′10″N 99°34′24″W	1	*	*
0111	Miguel Alemán	27°37′10″N 99°37′28″W	114	60	54
0113	Nuevo Progreso	27°29′51″N 99°35′34″W	432	221	211
0121	Vicente Guerrero	27°21′49″N 99°44′40″W	12	9	3
0125	San Vicente	27°38′32″N 99°40′35″W	2	*	*
0131	Santa Emilia	27°37′23″N 99°37′41″W	4	*	*
0138	Santo Niño	27°34′46″N 99°51′24″W	6	*	*
0139	El Nido	27°35′35″N 99°48′55″W	1	*	*
0143	Santa Clara	27°30′13″N 99°47′31″W	4	*	*
0156	Dos Pollos Solos (Miguel Alemán)	27°35′32″N 99°44′07″W	1	*	*
0162	El Campanario y Oradel	27°28′32″N 99°37′12″W	6,951	3,488	3,463
0163	La Lagartija	27°26′56″N 99°38′29″W	5	*	*
0172	La Unión	27°24′08″N 99°41′48″W	3	*	*
0174	Rancho Nuevo	27°24′34″N 99°39′50″W	1	*	*
0180	El Milagro	27°20′01″N 99°44′10″W	3	*	*
0186	El Francés	27°34′42″N 99°31′46″W	1	*	*
0187	Los Gavilanes	27°25′34″N 99°37′03″W	3	*	*
0190	El Huizache	27°25′51″N 99°36′44″W	1	*	*
0191	Lazaderos	27°24′56″N 99°38′55″W	2	*	*
0193	La Jabalina	27°23′26″N 99°36′21″W	3	*	*
0194	La Esperanza	27°20′36″N 99°34′50″W	69	39	30
0195	El Diecisiete (Santa Cecilia)	27°23′02″N 99°35′09″W	3	*	*
0196	Los Garza (Los Toros)	27°22′44″N 99°36′32″W	4	*	*
0197	Las Cuervas	27°22′04″N 99°36′03″W	3	*	*
0199	El Parral	27°21′34″N 99°37′31″W	2	*	*
0202	El Rosario	27°20′35″N 99°38′16″W	3	*	*
0203	El Tauro	27°24′03″N 99°29′37″W	3	*	*
0205	El Cadillal	27°23′19″N 99°31′22″W	6	*	*
0209	La Huizachoza	27°22′05″N 99°30′48″W	3	*	*
0212	Las Lomas	27°18′01″N 99°30′12″W	2	*	*
0219	Gem	27°20′34″N 99°33′54″W	4	3	1
0220	El Brasil	27°30′32″N 99°48′36″W	3	*	*
0222	La Herradura	27°34′50″N 99°37′16″W	8	3	5
0227	América	27°19′44″N 99°35′24″W	255	136	119
0243	Santo Tomás	27°22′58″N 99°35′26″W	2	*	*
0250	Ampliación San Francisco	27°35′14″N 99°38′38″W	1	*	*
0256	Las Carmelitas	27°23′51″N 99°29′58″W	3	*	*
0269	San Francisco	27°37′18″N 99°38′58″W	10	7	3
0271	Santa Cecilia	27°23′33″N 99°30′27″W	3	*	*
0275	Club Cinegético	27°17′00″N 99°36′24″W	3	*	*
0286	San Juan (Las Amapolas)	27°23′22″N 99°29′39″W	3	*	*
0297	Rogelio Cárdenas (La Molienda)	27°19′03″N 99°35′15″W	3	*	*
0304	Antonio Cárdenas	27°18′39″N 99°34′06″W	3	*	*
0305	Puertecitos	27°23′01″N 99°31′03″W	2	*	*
0308	América	27°19′34″N 99°34′07″W	197	101	96
0310	San Daniel	27°23′06″N 99°31′56″W	2	*	*
0325	El Chaparral	27°38′17″N 99°43′16″W	1	*	*
0327	El Charro	27°39′54″N 99°44′29″W	2	*	*
0330	Don Ignacio	27°29′05″N 99°38′13″W	3	*	*
0333	Las Norias	27°23′02″N 99°34′16″W	7	*	*
0338	San Manuel	27°20′33″N 99°42′40″W	1	*	*
0366	El Capricho	27°17′57″N 99°42′03″W	3	*	*
0376	Altos Amarillos	27°32′08″N 99°42′12″W	1	*	*
0393	Santa Virginia	27°19′35″N 99°31′55″W	1	*	*
0395	Los Papalotes	27°37′26″N 99°47′43″W	3	*	*
0399	La Pendencia	27°29′12″N 99°40′32″W	5	*	*
0401	La Copa	27°18′03″N 99°35′59″W	3	*	*
0404	Hugo Galindo	27°25′40″N 99°34′02″W	3	*	*
0408	La Pita	27°23′26″N 99°39′06″W	1	*	*
0409	Los Ramos	27°37′30″N 99°37′45″W	1	*	*
0411	General Francisco Villa	27°26′13″N 99°36′27″W	1	*	*
0413	San Ricardo	27°16′51″N 99°33′38″W	3	*	*
0414	Palo Blanco (Gerónimo Zamora)	27°21′14″N 99°32′26″W	2	*	*
0418	Don Ramón	27°17′20″N 99°36′15″W	3	*	*
0423	Los Cavazos	27°24′08″N 99°39′16″W	1	*	*
0424	Raúl Mangín	27°23′55″N 99°35′16″W	3	*	*
0429	San Fernando	27°37′06″N 99°38′36″W	4	*	*
0432	San Antonio	27°36′01″N 99°35′06″W	1	*	*
0434	San Francisco	27°35′28″N 99°37′31″W	1	*	*
0438	Santa Teresita	27°18′27″N 99°32′56″W	3	*	*
0440	Bruno Álvarez Valdez	27°28′00″N 99°35′34″W	1,714	879	835
0441	Ninguno	27°28′22″N 99°38′02″W	3	*	*
0442	Ninguno	27°27′17″N 99°42′38″W	3	*	*
0446	Ninguno (Estación Cuarentenaria)	27°17′33″N 99°34′49″W	3	*	*
0449	Chore	27°27′49″N 99°40′12″W	3	*	*
0450	Candelaria	27°27′31″N 99°41′36″W	1	*	*
0454	Héctor Calderón	27°25′05″N 99°30′45″W	7	*	*
0456	El Michoacano	27°28′57″N 99°39′05″W	3	*	*
0457	Guillermo Cristo	27°29′25″N 99°38′55″W	3	*	*
0459	Carlos Ramos	27°19′11″N 99°45′01″W	9	4	5
0460	Sergio Lugo	27°19′06″N 99°44′18″W	9	5	4
0464	Los Artistas Segunda Etapa	27°32′08″N 99°42′12″W	54	28	26
0467	Ninguno	27°39′45″N 99°44′26″W	2	*	*
0468	El Mirdor	27°35′23″N 99°46′12″W	1	*	*
0470	Moreno (Transcarga y Ganado)	27°36′56″N 99°40′46″W	4	*	*
0471	Brago (Transportes)	27°36′51″N 99°40′37″W	1	*	*
0472	El Role Garza	27°36′58″N 99°39′06″W	1	*	*
0473	San Francisco	27°36′17″N 99°39′27″W	1	*	*
0480	Ninguno	27°26′40″N 99°36′45″W	3	*	*
0482	Las Liebres	27°23′25″N 99°30′30″W	2	*	*
9998	Places with one household		157	99	58
9999	Places with two household		58	37	21
0000	Nuevo Laredo Municipality	27°25′58″N 99°40′24″W	384,033	191,001	193,032

== See also ==
- Municipalities of Tamaulipas
- Nuevo Laredo (City)
- Tamaulipas
