= Juan Gualberto Amaya =

Mexican military personnel

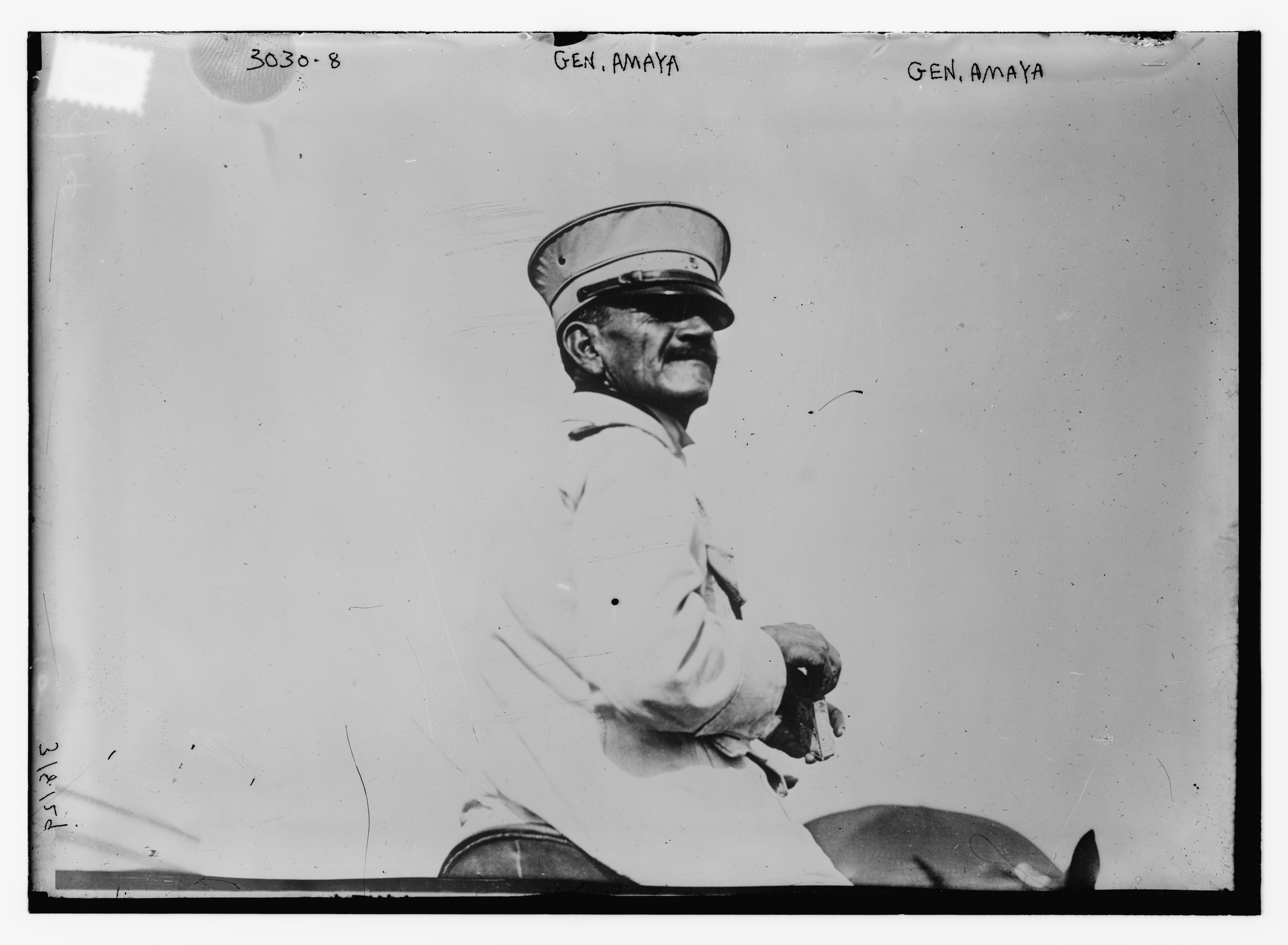

Governor of Durango
- In office 1928–1930
- President: Emilio Portes Gil
- Preceded by: José Aguirre S.
- Succeeded by: José Adolfo Terrones Benítez

Personal details
- Born: 1887 Santa María del Oro, Durango, Mexico
- Died: 1964 (aged 77) Location Unknown

Military service
- Allegiance: Constitutionalists; Carrancistas
- Branch: Mexican Army
- Years of service: 1910–1920
- Rank: Brigadier General
- Battles/wars: Mexican Revolution: Third Battle of Torreón

Juan Gualberto Amaya (1887–1964) was a Mexican brigadier general and politician who served the Mexican Revolution and is known for fighting against Pancho villa in the Third Battle of Torreón and being the former governor of Durango.

== Biography ==
Originally from Santa María del Oro, Durango. Since 1913 he joined the forces that rose up in those surroundings against Victoriano Huerta, but his more notable military operations were carried out under the orders of General Francisco Murguía in the campaign against Pancho Villa in the north of the country, between 1917 and 1919. He joined the pronouncement of the Agua Prieta Plan against President Venustiano Carranza. Later on, he was loyal to the government of General Álvaro Obregón, reaching the rank of Brigadier General. He triumphed in the electoral fight to be Governor of Durango from 1928 to 1932, taking office on September 15, 1928. However, in March of the following year he adhered to the Hermosillo Plan, acting in agreement with the Chief of Operations in the state, General Francisco Urbalejo, to support General José Gonzalo Escobar, who had spoken in Torreón. He left the government when the Escobar Rebellion failed, in addition to the fact that the federal government ignored his military rank, taking refuge in the United States, where he remained for several years. He returned afterwards and retired to private life. He died in 1964.
