= Los Artistas, Tamaulipas =

Coordinates: 27°31′39″N 99°35′33″W

Los Artistas Segunda Etapa Los Artistas
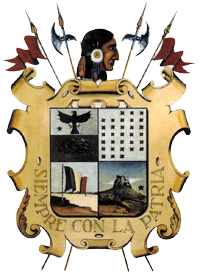
- Seal

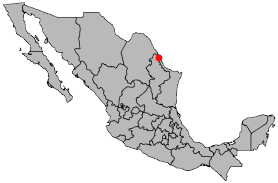
- Elevation: 164 m (538 ft)

Population (2010)
  - Total: 54
- Time zone: UTC-6 (CST)
  - Summer (DST): UTC-5 (CST)
- Codigo Postal: 88000
- Area code: +52-867
- Nearest Airports: Laredo: Laredo International Airport KLRD LRD Nuevo Laredo: Quetzalcoatl International Airport MMNL NLD

Los Artistas Segunda Etapa is a community located in Nuevo Laredo Municipality in the Mexican state of Tamaulipas. According to the INEGI Census of 2010, Los Artistas has a population of 54 inhabitants. Its elevation is 164 meters above sea level.
