= Fortunato Maycotte =

Mexican soldier (1891–1924)

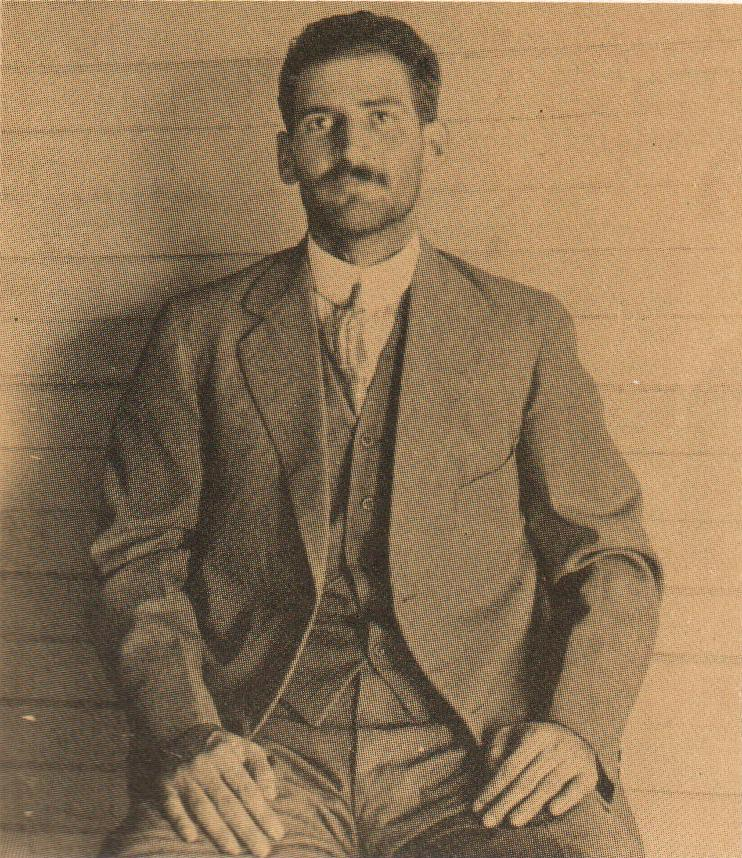
- Portrait of Maycotte, c. 1917
- Born: Fortunato Maycotte Camero; October 26, 1891; Progreso, Coahuila, Mexico
- Died: May 12, 1924 (aged 32)
- Cause of death: Firing squad

General Fortunato Maycotte Camero (October 26, 1891 – May 12, 1924) was a Mexican soldier who participated in the Mexican Revolution.

== Early life ==
Fortunato was born in Progreso, Coahuila, on October 26, 1891, and baptised seven months after. His parents were Apuleyo Maycotte and Juana Camero. He became affiliated with the Maderist movement in 1910.

== Constitutionalism ==
In 1913, Maycotte joined the constitucionalistas forces. He revolted against Victoriano Huerta in 1913 and was head of cavalry during the period of Pancho Villa. He reached the rank of General of Division. He was represented in the Convention of Aguascalientes in October 1914 by Juan Hernández. Faithful to Venustiano Carranza, he excelled in the fight against Pancho Villa in 1915. From June 26 to October 15, 1916, he was Governor of Durango.

== Plan of Agua Prieta ==
In 1920 he rebelled against Venustiano Carranza, adhering in Chilpancingo, Guerrero, to his former boss Álvaro Obregón, supporting the Plan of Agua Prieta.

In 1923, he supported the rebellion of Adolfo of the Huerta. He was commissioned to fight rebels in Oaxaca and Puebla. He was defeated in the Battle of Palo Blanco. His forces surrendered on May 11, 1924, following several hours of fighting in the small town of Altata.

== Death ==
Maycotte received a court martial trial on May 12, 1924. He was then executed by firing squad alongside his chief of staff Leovigildo Avila and Manuel Flores.
