= El Campanario y Oradel, Tamaulipas =

Coordinates: 27°28′23″N 99°37′12″W

El Campanario y Oradel
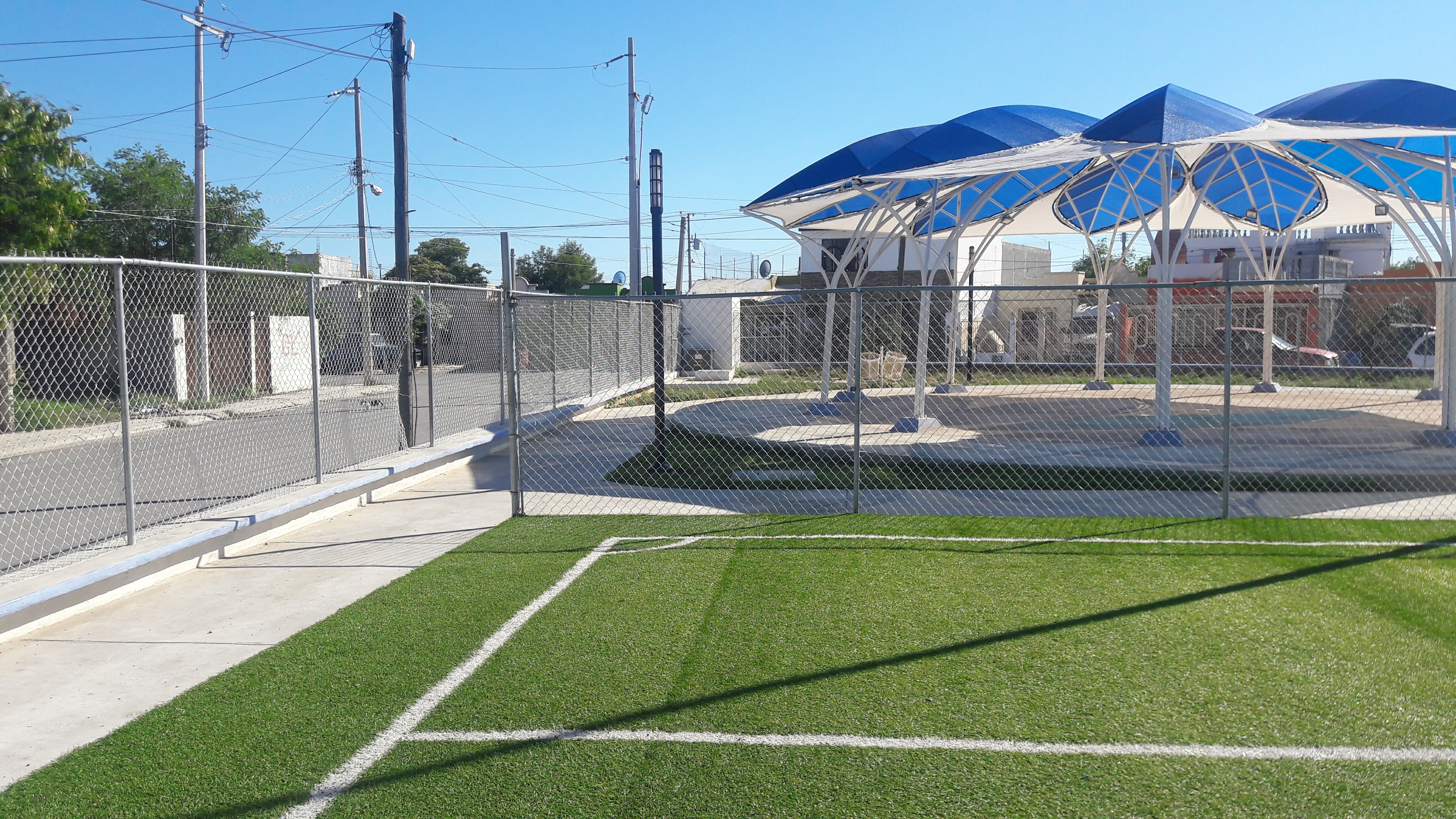
- Park in El Campanario y Oradel

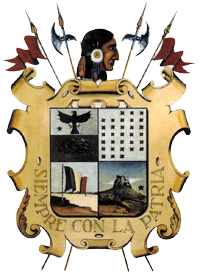
- Seal

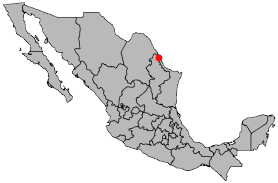
- Elevation: 140 m (460 ft)

Population (2010)
  - Total: 6,951
- Time zone: UTC-6 (CST)
  - Summer (DST): UTC-5 (CST)
- Postal Code: 88000
- Area code: +52-867
- Nearest Airports: Laredo: Laredo International Airport KLRD LRD Nuevo Laredo: Quetzalcoatl International Airport MMNL NLD

El Campanario y Oradel (or Campanario) is a community located in Oradel Industrial Center, Nuevo Laredo Municipality in the Mexican state of Tamaulipas. Its elevation is 140 meters above sea level. According to the INEGI Census of 2010, El Campanario y Oradel has a population of 6,951 inhabitants, 3488 of them are male and 3463 of them are female. In this town there are 1796 family homes. The main work activity of this community is to work in the companies located within the Oradel Industrial Center. In the El Campanario and Villas Oradel is the Technological University of Nuevo Laredo, as well as an IMSS nursery. This community has 2 soccer fields, one where the Villas de Oradel league is held.

== See also ==
- Oradel Industrial Center
