= Progreso, Texas =

- City
- City of Progreso
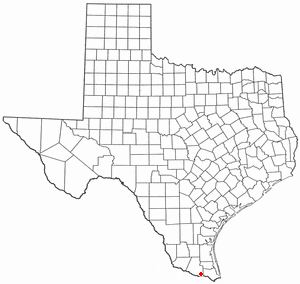
- Location of Progreso, Texas

- Coordinates: 26°5′37″N 97°57′27″W
- Country: United States
- State: Texas
- County: Hidalgo

Area
  - Total: 3.00 sq mi (7.76 km^{2})
  - Land: 3.00 sq mi (7.76 km^{2})
  - Water: 0 sq mi (0.00 km^{2})
- Elevation: 69 ft (21 m)

Population (2020)
  - Total: 4,807
  - Density: 1,984.5/sq mi (766.23/km^{2})
- Time zone: UTC-6 (Central (CST))
  - Summer (DST): UTC-5 (CDT)
- ZIP code: 78579
- Area code: 956
- FIPS code: 48-59636
- GNIS feature ID: 1388197
- Website: cityofprogreso.com

Progreso is a city in Hidalgo County, Texas, United States. As of the 2020 census, Progreso had a population of 4,807. It is part of the McAllen–Edinburg–Mission and Reynosa–McAllen metropolitan areas.

== Geography ==
Progreso is located at 26°05′37″N 97°57′27″W (26.093724, –97.957530), south of Weslaco on FM 1015 and HWY 281. It borders the Mexican town of Nuevo Progreso, formerly known as Las Flores.

According to the United States Census Bureau, the city has a total area of 3.0 square miles (7.8 km^{2}), all land.

== Demographics ==
Historical population
Census	Pop.	Note	%±
1980	1,436		—
1990	1,951		35.9%
2000	4,851		148.6%
2010	5,507		13.5%
2020	4,807		−12.7%
U.S. Decennial Census; 1850–1900 1910; 1920 1930 1940; 1950 1960 1970; 1980 1990 2000; 2010 2020

Progreso first appeared as a census designated place in the 1980 United States census; and after incorporation, as a city in the 2000 U.S. census.

=== Racial and ethnic composition ===
Progreso city, Texas – Racial and ethnic composition Note: the US Census treats Hispanic/Latino as an ethnic category. This table excludes Latinos from the racial categories and assigns them to a separate category. Hispanics/Latinos may be of any race.
Race / Ethnicity (NH = Non-Hispanic)	Pop 2000	Pop 2010	Pop 2020	% 2000	% 2010	% 2020
White alone (NH)	45	84	35	0.93%	1.53%	0.73%
Black or African American alone (NH)	0	1	3	0.00%	0.02%	0.06%
Native American or Alaska Native alone (NH)	0	1	4	0.00%	0.02%	0.08%
Asian alone (NH)	2	2	1	0.04%	0.04%	0.02%
Native Hawaiian or Pacific Islander alone (NH)	0	0	0	0.00%	0.00%	0.00%
Other race alone (NH)	1	2	9	0.02%	0.04%	0.19%
Mixed race or Multiracial (NH)	0	0	5	0.00%	0.00%	0.10%
Hispanic or Latino (any race)	4,803	5,417	4,750	99.01%	98.37%	98.81%
Total	4,851	5,507	4,807	100.00%	100.00%	100.00%

=== 2020 census ===
As of the 2020 census, there were 4,807 people living in the city, and the census counted 1,243 families.

The median age was 29.4 years; 31.7% of residents were under the age of 18 and 11.6% of residents were 65 years of age or older. For every 100 females there were 91.1 males, and for every 100 females age 18 and over there were 88.5 males age 18 and over.

There were 1,236 households in Progreso, of which 52.8% had children under the age of 18 living in them. Of all households, 54.0% were married-couple households, 12.8% were households with a male householder and no spouse or partner present, and 29.7% were households with a female householder and no spouse or partner present. About 12.2% of all households were made up of individuals and 6.7% had someone living alone who was 65 years of age or older.

There were 1,381 housing units, of which 10.5% were vacant. The homeowner vacancy rate was 0.6% and the rental vacancy rate was 14.4%.

97.1% of residents lived in urban areas, while 2.9% lived in rural areas.

=== 2000 census ===
As of the census of 2000, there were 4,851 people, 1,023 households, and 951 families residing in the city. The population density was 1,626.0 inhabitants per square mile (627.8/km^{2}). There were 1,127 housing units at an average density of 377.8 per square mile (145.9/km^{2}). The racial makeup of the city was 89.01% White, 0.10% Native American, 0.04% Asian, 10.33% from other races, and 0.52% from two or more races. Hispanic or Latino of any race were 99.01% of the population.

There were 1,023 households, out of which 63.0% had children under the age of 18 living with them, 71.8% were married couples living together, 15.7% had a female householder with no husband present, and 7.0% were non-families. 6.4% of all households were made up of individuals, and 3.2% had someone living alone who was 65 years of age or older. The average household size was 4.73 and the average family size was 4.94.

In the city, the population was spread out, with 42.5% under the age of 18, 12.9% from 18 to 24, 25.2% from 25 to 44, 13.3% from 45 to 64, and 6.0% who were 65 years of age or older. The median age was 22 years. For every 100 females, there were 101.8 males. For every 100 females age 18 and over, there were 93.3 males.

The median income for a household in the city was $18,184, and the median income for a family was $18,313. Males had a median income of $14,961 versus $13,542 for females. The per capita income for the city was $4,789. About 51.4% of families and 50.9% of the population were below the poverty line, including 56.4% of those under age 18 and 37.2% of those age 65 or over.

== Education ==
Progreso is served by the Progreso Independent School District. In addition, South Texas Independent School District operates magnet schools that serve the community.

== Government and infrastructure ==
The United States Postal Service operates the Progreso Post Office.

== See also ==
- Progreso Texas Port of Entry
