= Remy International =

American manufacturing company

Remy International, Inc. (formerly Delco Remy) headquartered in Pendleton, Indiana is an American manufacturer, remanufacturer, and distributor of light duty starters, alternators, hybrid power technology, and Delco Remy brand heavy duty systems. Remy has facilities in eleven countries (such as Belgium, Germany, Hungary, United Kingdom, USA, Canada, Mexico and Tunisia) and four different continents around the world.

== History ==
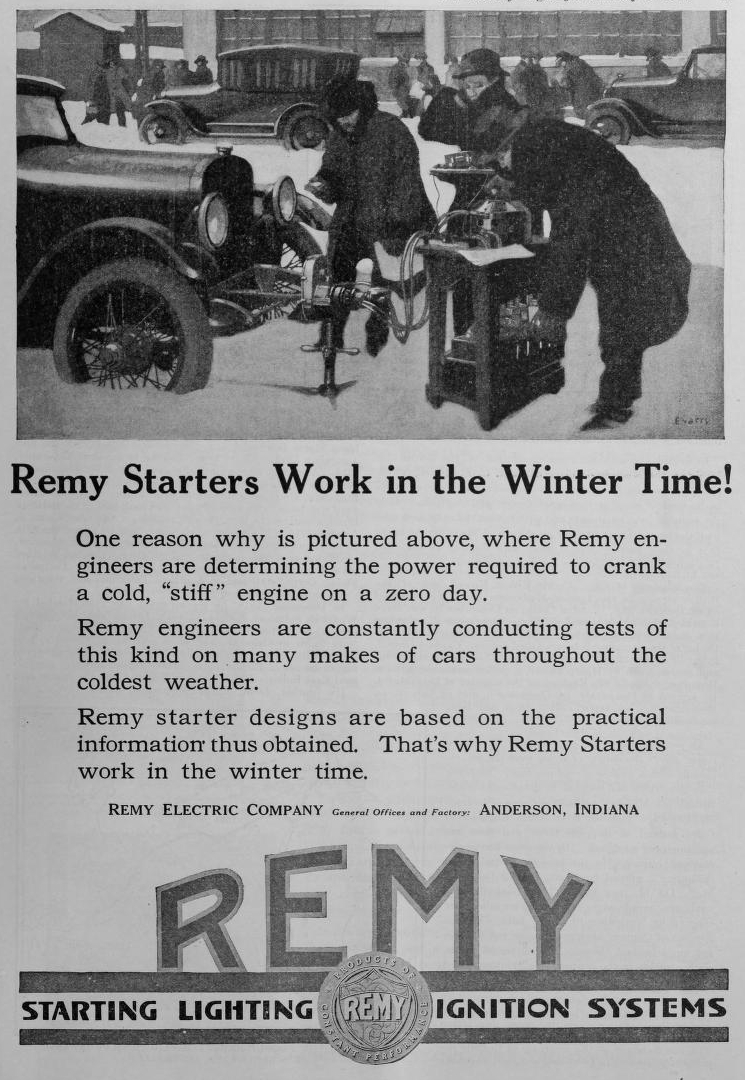
A 1920 advertisement

Remy International had its beginnings in 1896 when Frank and Perry Remy Nates opened a home wiring business in Anderson, Indiana. In 1901 the Remy Electric Company was incorporated. Perry Remy had conducted experiments with magnetos and by 1910 the company was producing 50,000 magnetos a year. The magnetos were made for a number of early cars, which included Buick.

To prove the dependability of their product, the Remy brothers sent two men on a 6,000-mile (9,700 km) journey in 1909. They drove a Remy-equipped Buick Four on a ten-week trip from the hills of Kentucky to the swamps of Florida.

The Remy brothers sold their firm to Stoughton Fletcher Jr. and the Fletcher Savings and Trust in 1911 for a reputed one million dollars. Fletcher expanded the product line to include cranking motors, generators, and distributors.

Remy's competition was Dayton Engineering Laboratories Company (Delco) under the leadership of Charles F. Kettering, who - along with Clyde Coleman - invented the electric starter motor for vehicles in 1911. Kettering also manufactured ignition equipment and generators.

The United States Motor Company purchased the two competitors in 1916 and incorporated them into their operations. The companies remained separated until purchased by General Motors two years later. It became the company's second-largest parts-manufacturing center outside of Michigan.

In 1918, Delco Remy began operating as a division of General Motors, developing advanced technologies and providing the industry with automotive, heavy duty and military products. A successful General Motors division for more than 75 years, Delco Remy became its own entity in 1994 when a group of private investors bought the heavy duty and automotive divisions.

Delco Remy changed its name to Remy International on August 1, 2004. The company continued to use the Delco Remy brand for some products under license from General Motors.

In October 2007 Remy Worldwide Holdings filed a voluntary prepackaged proceeding under chapter 11 of the US Bankruptcy Code and exited the proceedings in 2008. Fidelity National Financial came to be their largest equity holder with 47% of the shares of common stock by converting Fidelity's ownership of Remy's bonds into new equity of the reorganized Remy.

On December 13, 2012, Remy International was listed on the Nasdaq stock exchange and CEO John Weber rang the ceremonial opening bell on December 17, 2012. Approximately one year later, Remy stock was listed to the Nasdaq Global Select Market on December 16, 2013.

Remy International announced on January 13, 2014, that it would acquire the assets of USA Industries. USA Industries is a worldwide distributor of remanufactured and new alternators, starters, CV axles and disc brake calipers. It was founded in 1985 in Bay Shore, New York. Today, USA Industries has over 300 employees with warehousing and distribution centers across the United States.

BorgWarner announced an agreement to acquire Remy International on July 13, 2015, and completed the acquisition on November 10, 2015. "Delco Remy" remains a registered trademark of General Motors Corporation licensed to BorgWarner PDS (Anderson) L.L.C.

On January 25, 2019, BBB Industries, LLC, acquired the equity interests of the Remy North American Rotating Electric business consisting of Worldwide Automotive, LLC and Remy Mexico Holdings B.V., more commonly known as “Remy Power Products”. The transaction encompasses the entirety of the North American Rotating Electric business. The “Remy” brand is a licensed trademark of BBB Industries, LLC.

In July 2023, BorgWarner spun off its fuel parts and aftermarket segments as part of a plan to focus on its electric vehicle drivetrain business. The newly created standalone company PHINIA, which took over the fuel parts and aftermarket segments, publicly trades on the New York Stock Exchange under the symbol PHIN.

== Products ==
=== Heavy duty products ===
Remy International's heavy duty products are sold under the Delco Remy brand which is licensed from General Motors. As of 2014, only starters and alternators are manufactured and sold under the Delco Remy brand name. The company sells products as components for new vehicle production in addition to replacement units and parts through various distributors and original equipment dealerships.

==== Alternators ====
Remy International produces both brush-style and brushless heavy duty alternators. The brushless contains fewer moving parts, increasing both efficiency and durability. Examples of current brushless products include 36SI, 40SI, and 55SI, and brush style the 24SI and 28SI.

== See also ==
- Oradel Industrial Center
