= La Esperanza, Tamaulipas =

Coordinates: 27°20′36″N 99°34′50″W

La Esperanza
- community
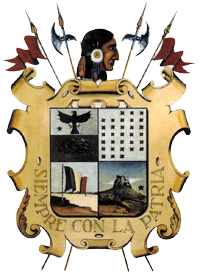
- Seal

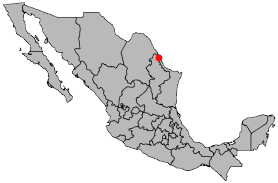

Population (2010)
  - Total: 69
- Time zone: UTC-6 (CST)
  - Summer (DST): UTC-5 (CST)
- Codigo Postal: 88000
- Area code: +52-867
- Nearest Airports: Laredo: Laredo International Airport KLRD LRD Nuevo Laredo: Quetzalcoatl International Airport MMNL NLD

La Esperanza is a community located in Nuevo Laredo Municipality in the Mexican state of Tamaulipas. According to the INEGI Census of 2010, La Esperanza has a population of 69 inhabitants, 39 males and 30 females. Its elevation is 164 meters above sea level.
