= Álvarez, Tamaulipas =

Coordinates: 27°28′00″N 99°35′34″W

Bruno Álvarez Valdez, Tamaulipas Álvarez, Tamaulipas
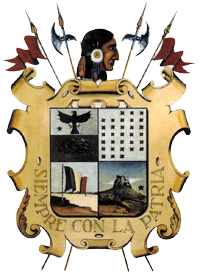
- Seal

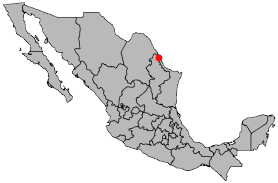
- Country: Mexico
- State: Tamaulipas
- Municipality: Nuevo Laredo
- Elevation: 141 m (463 ft)

Population (2010)
  - Total: 1,714
- Time zone: UTC-6 (CST)
  - Summer (DST): UTC-5 (CST)
- Codigo Postal: 88000
- Area code: +52-867
- Nearest Airports: Laredo: Laredo International Airport KLRD LRD Nuevo Laredo: Quetzalcoatl International Airport MMNL NLD

Álvarez, Tamaulipas is a community located in the Nuevo Laredo Municipality in the Mexican state of Tamaulipas. According to the INEGI Census of 2010, Álvarez has a population of 1,714 inhabitants. Its elevation is 141 meters above sea level.
