= La Cruz, Tamaulipas =

Town in Tamaulipas, Mexico

Coordinates: 27°34′24″N 99°35′45″W

La Cruz
- Town
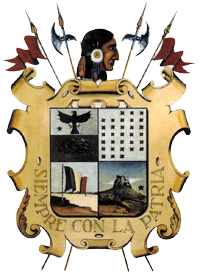
- Seal

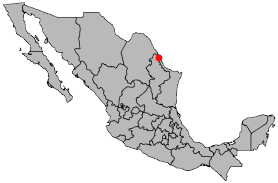
- Elevation: 132 m (433 ft)

Population (2010)
  - Total: 159
- Time zone: UTC-6 (CST)
  - Summer (DST): UTC-5 (CST)
- Codigo Postal: 88000
- Area code: +52-867
- Nearest Airports: Laredo: Laredo International Airport KLRD LRD Nuevo Laredo: Quetzalcoatl International Airport MMNL NLD

La Cruz is a community located in Nuevo Laredo Municipality in the Mexican state of Tamaulipas. According to the INEGI Census of 2010, La Cruz has a population of 159 inhabitants. Its elevation is 132 metres (433 ft) above sea level.
