= Tocache District =

Coordinates: 8.1870°S 76.5182°W

- District
- Interactive map of Tocache District
- Country: Peru
- Region: San Martín
- Province: Tocache
- Founded: May 7, 1940
- Capital: Tocache

Government
  - Mayor: David Bazan Arevalo

Area
  - Total: 1,142.04 km^{2} (440.94 sq mi)
- Elevation: 497 m (1,631 ft)

Population (2005 census)
  - Total: 25,974
  - Density: 22.744/km^{2} (58.905/sq mi)
- Time zone: UTC-5 (PET)
- UBIGEO: 221001

Tocache District is one of five districts of the province Tocache in Peru.
