= Shunte District =

Coordinates: 8.2281°S 77.1369°W

- District
- Interactive map of Shunte District
- Country: Peru
- Region: San Martín
- Province: Tocache
- Founded: December 6, 1984
- Capital: Tambo de Paja

Government
  - Mayor: Fernando Monge Serrato

Area
  - Total: 964.21 km^{2} (372.28 sq mi)
- Elevation: 1,200 m (3,900 ft)

Population (2005 census)
  - Total: 870
  - Density: 0.90/km^{2} (2.3/sq mi)
- Time zone: UTC-5 (PET)
- UBIGEO: 221004

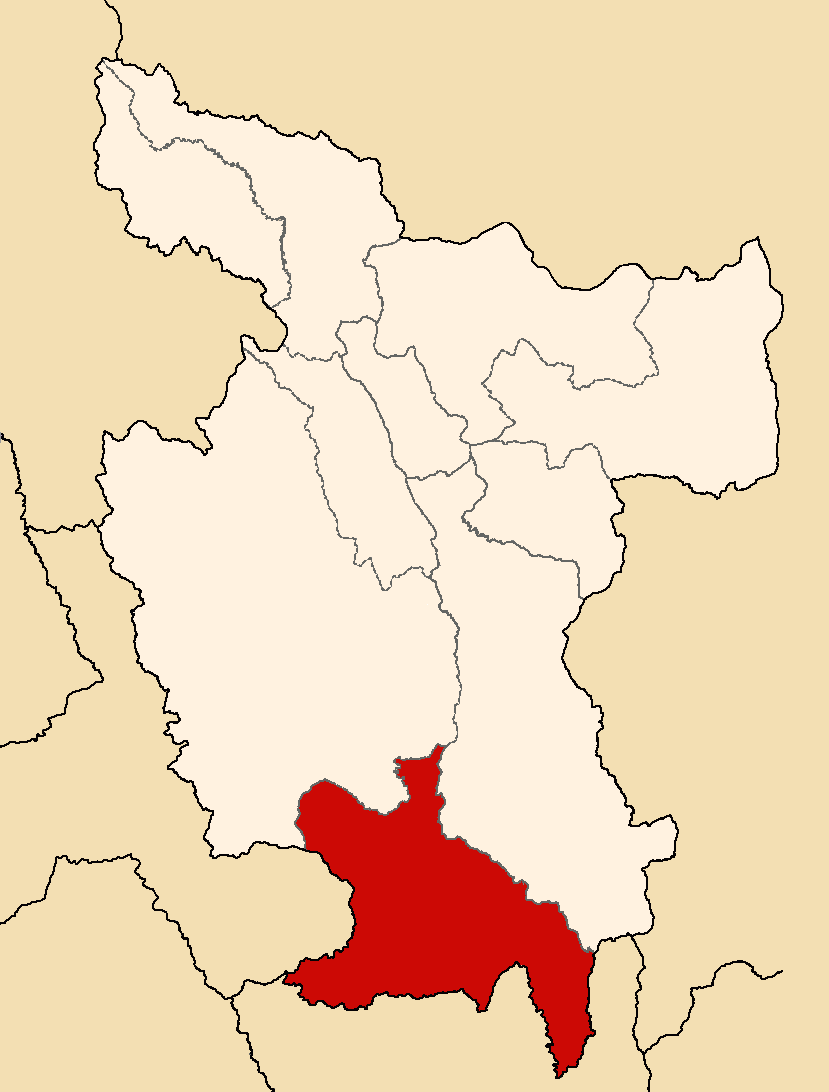

Shunte District is one of five districts of the province Tocache in Peru.
