= Nuevo Progreso District =

Coordinates: 8.4497°S 76.3337°W

Nuevo Progreso
- District
- Interactive map of Nuevo Progreso
- Country: Peru
- Region: San Martín
- Province: Tocache
- Founded: December 6, 1984
- Capital: Nuevo Progreso

Government
  - Mayor: Vidal Gonzales Zavaleta

Area
  - Total: 860.98 km^{2} (332.43 sq mi)
- Elevation: 490 m (1,610 ft)

Population (2005 census)
  - Total: 9,569
  - Density: 11.11/km^{2} (28.79/sq mi)
- Time zone: UTC-5 (PET)
- UBIGEO: 221002

Nuevo Progreso District is one of five districts of the province Tocache in Peru.
