= Progreso–Nuevo Progreso International Bridge =

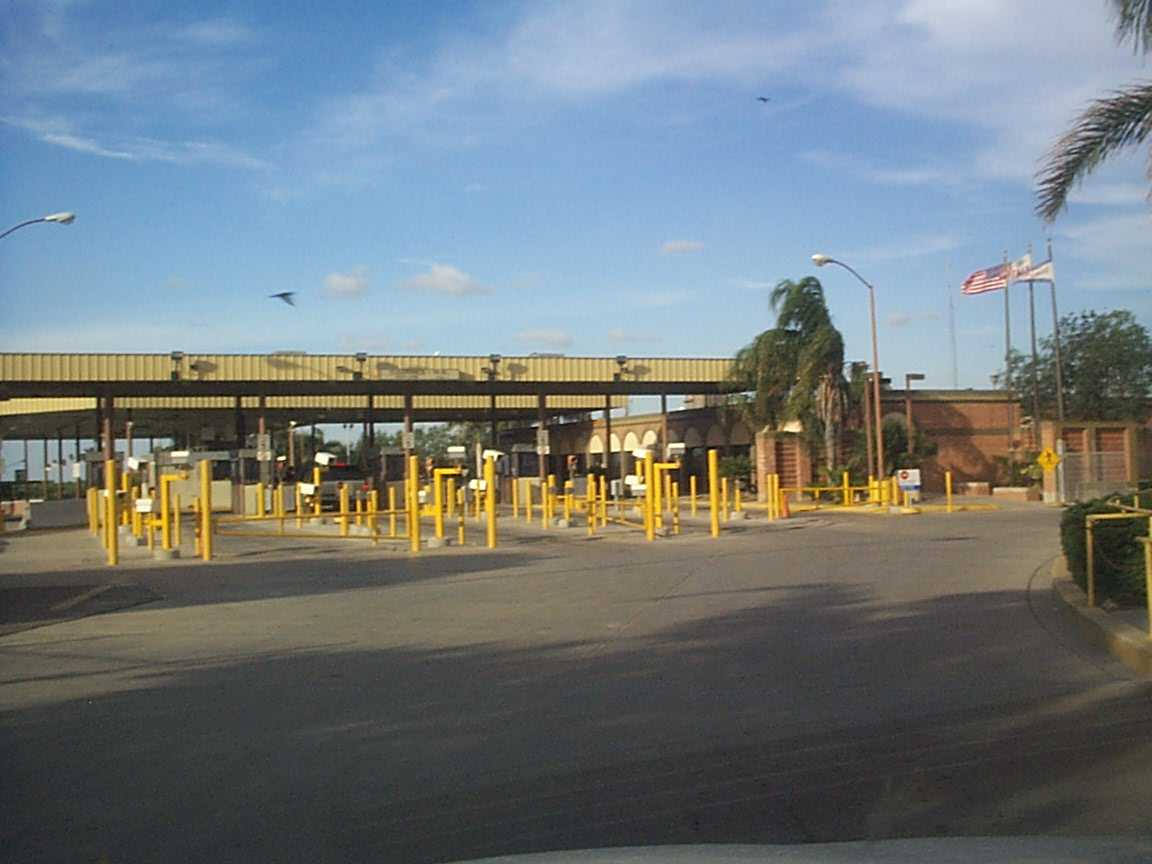
- Progreso Texas Border Inspection Station
- Coordinates: 26°03′43″N 97°56′57″W
- Locale: U.S.–Mexico border
- Other name: Progreso Port of Entry
- Website: www.cbp.gov/contact/ports/progresodonna

Characteristics
- Total length: 4,024 feet (1,227 m)

History
- Construction end: 1952

Location
- Interactive map of Progreso–Nuevo Progreso International Bridge

The Progreso–Nuevo Progreso International Bridge (Spanish: Puente Internacional Nuevo Progreso–Progreso), officially the Weslaco–Progreso International Bridge and also known as the B&P Bridge, is an international bridge over the Rio Grande on the U.S.–Mexico border, connecting the cities of Progreso, Texas and Nuevo Progreso, Río Bravo, Tamaulipas. It has been in operation since 1952.

== History ==
The Progreso–Nuevo Progreso International Bridge has been in operation at this location since 1952. During the first years of operation the bridge had relatively low crossings of pedestrians, automobile, and commercial traffic. When it opened, it was open 5:00 a.m. to midnight. Tolls were southbound only. Beginning in the 1970s, an increase in all three categories of crossing was seen. In 1981, a partnership constructed a grain elevator here for the exportation of corn and grain to Mexico. Cargill, Inc. purchased this grain elevator in 1990. This exportation of agriculture products continued to grow to the point that four grain elevators are now exporting agriculture products to Mexico (corn, grain sorghum, cotton seed, beans, and popcorn). With the signing of the North American Free Trade Agreement (NAFTA), a substantial increase in commercial traffic in both directions has developed and a new bridge was seen as necessary.

From 1993 through the end of 1997, the Texas Department of Transportation invested over $10 million in FM 1015, which connects to US 281 and I-2/US 83. The Texas Department of Transportation invested over $5 million more in 1998 and in 1999 to provide for five lanes of traffic.

The new bridge was completed in 2003 and features broad, covered walkways on each side and four traffic lanes. A truck bridge, located to the East side, is open to remove heavy northbound truck traffic.

Bridge traffic has been very substantial over the past decade, both southbound and northbound. Since 2000, about 1.25 million pedestrians cross the bridge each year. Another million cars make the Southbound crossing. Truck and tour bus traffic has also increased steadily. Much of the truck crossing now carries grain, primarily corn for tortillas, to Mexico. Very little truck cargo crosses from Mexico, although this is expected to change with the opening of the new truck bridge.

== Border crossing ==
The Progreso Port of Entry was opened in July, 1952, with the completion of the bridge. The original US Border Inspection Station was replaced by the General Services Administration in 1983, and the bridge itself was rebuilt in 2003.

Currently, a $4.00 toll is required when traveling in either direction per vehicle. Pedestrians toll is $1.00 into Mexico, and 30 cents into the United States. Parking is located on both sides of FM 1015 before entering the toll gate.

== See also ==
- List of international bridges in North America
- List of Mexico–United States border crossings
