= América, Tamaulipas =

Coordinates: 27°19′44″N 99°35′24″W

América
- community
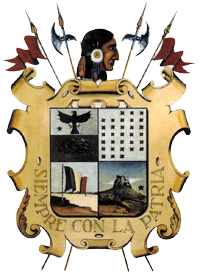
- Seal

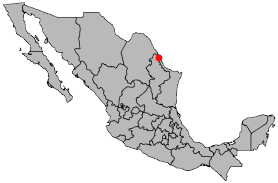
- Country: Mexico
- State: Tamaulipas
- Municipality: Nuevo Laredo
- Elevation: 140 m (460 ft)

Population (2010)
  - Total: 255
- Time zone: UTC-6 (CST)
  - Summer (DST): UTC-5 (CST)
- Codigo Postal: 88000
- Area code: +52-867
- Nearest Airports: Laredo: Laredo International Airport KLRD LRD Nuevo Laredo: Quetzalcoatl International Airport MMNL LD

América is a community located in Nuevo Laredo in the Mexican state of Tamaulipas. According to the INEGI Census of 2010, América has a population of 255 inhabitants. Its elevation is 140 meters above sea level.
