= Pólvora District =

Coordinates: 7.9074°S 76.6703°W

- District
- Interactive map of Pólvora District
- Country: Peru
- Region: San Martín
- Province: Tocache
- Founded: December 6, 1984
- Capital: Pólvora

Government
  - Mayor: Victor Alberto Cordova Vela

Area
  - Total: 2,174.48 km^{2} (839.57 sq mi)
- Elevation: 540 m (1,770 ft)

Population (2005 census)
  - Total: 9,017
  - Density: 4.147/km^{2} (10.74/sq mi)
- Time zone: UTC-5 (PET)
- UBIGEO: 221003

Pólvora District is one of five districts of the province Tocache in Peru.

== Climate ==
Climate data for Tananta, Pólvora, elevation 480 m (1,570 ft), (1991–2020)
Month	Jan	Feb	Mar	Apr	May	Jun	Jul	Aug	Sep	Oct	Nov	Dec	Year
Mean daily maximum °C (°F)	30.8 (87.4)	30.3 (86.5)	30.4 (86.7)	30.9 (87.6)	30.9 (87.6)	30.5 (86.9)	30.7 (87.3)	31.4 (88.5)	31.8 (89.2)	31.5 (88.7)	31.5 (88.7)	30.9 (87.6)	31.0 (87.7)
Mean daily minimum °C (°F)	21.5 (70.7)	21.5 (70.7)	21.6 (70.9)	21.4 (70.5)	21.0 (69.8)	20.2 (68.4)	19.6 (67.3)	19.6 (67.3)	19.9 (67.8)	20.8 (69.4)	21.3 (70.3)	21.5 (70.7)	20.8 (69.5)
Average precipitation mm (inches)	258.7 (10.19)	311.5 (12.26)	238.3 (9.38)	152.8 (6.02)	127.7 (5.03)	95.5 (3.76)	86.0 (3.39)	80.2 (3.16)	131.5 (5.18)	227.4 (8.95)	264.3 (10.41)	288.1 (11.34)	2,262 (89.07)
Source: National Meteorology and Hydrology Service of Peru
