= Tocache =

- Town
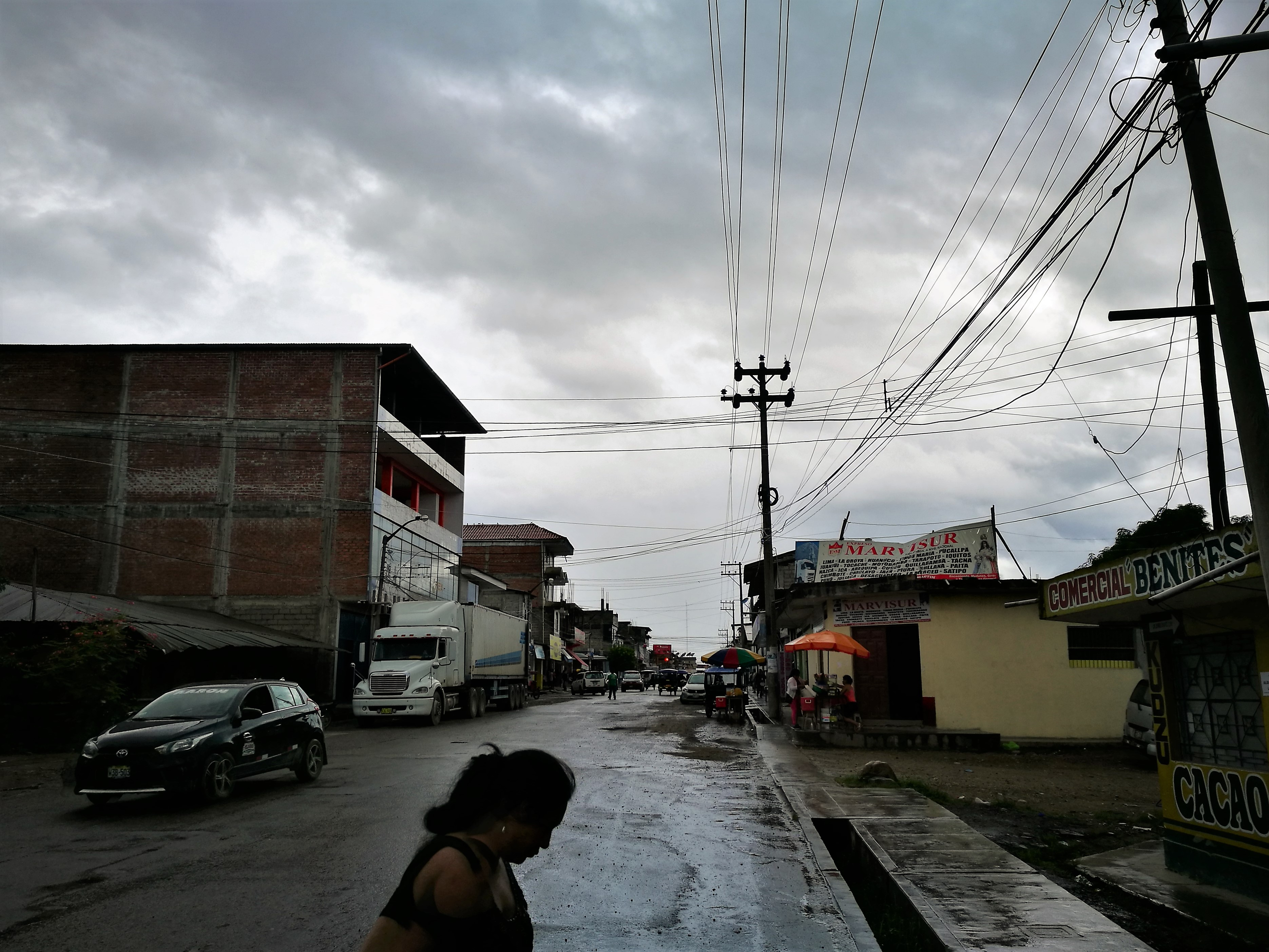

- Location within Peru
- Coordinates: 8°11′20″S 76°30′50″W
- Country: Peru
- Region: San Martín
- Province: Tocache
- District: Tocache

Government
  - Mayor: David Bazan Arevalo
- Elevation: 497 m (1,631 ft)
- Time zone: UTC-5 (PET)

Tocache is a town in Northern Peru, capital of the province Tocache in the region San Martín. There were 23,511 inhabitants according to the 2007 census.
