= San Cristóbal Cucho =

- Municipality
- Location in Guatemala
- Coordinates: 14°54′00″N 91°47′00″W
- Country: Guatemala
- Department: San Marcos

Government
  - Mayor: Baudilio Ricardo Ramírez (Partido Patriota)

Area
  - Municipality: 35.9 km^{2} (13.9 sq mi)

Population (2018 census)
  - Municipality: 16,619
  - Density: 463/km^{2} (1,200/sq mi)
  - Urban: 5,487

San Cristóbal Cucho is a town and municipality in the San Marcos department of Guatemala.It was found on 11 October 1825. It was annexed to San Pedro Sacatepéquez, in 1935, but it was named a municipality again on 12 July 1945.

== History ==
The region was discovered by the Spaniards in the 16th century; soldiers under captain Juan de Dios y Cardona's command found the place. Before that, it had been populated by Mam people. After the arrival of the Spaniards, it was established as an Indian reduction and eventually raised to a municipality on 11 October 1811, and named "San Cristóbal Cucho". It is located to the south of San Marcos Department municipal capital.

== Population ==
As of 2009, San Cristóbal Cucho had 19.443 inhabitants and almost 4.000 home; it has 56 km^{2} and sits 2730 m above sea level.

San Cristóbal Cucho most common ailments
Sickness	Percent (%)
Parasitism	28.52
Malnourishment	11.13
Common cold	9.38
Skin problems	6.12
Stomach problems	6.02
Diarrhea	4.84
Pneumonia	3.63
Tonsillitis	3.17
Arthritis	2.35
Urine infections	1.41
Others	23.42

San Cristóbal Cucho most common death causes
Cause	Percent (%)
Pneumonia	1.78
Diarrhea	1.00
Malnourishment	0.83
Embolism	0.22
Head trauma	0.11
Blood infections	0.11
Alcohol poisoning	0.06
Gun shots	0.06
Intestinal hernias	0.06
Cirrhosis	0.06

== Economy ==
Economic activity is mostly geared to agriculture, cattle, and commerce.

== Political division ==
The municipality has one town, five villages, seven settlements and four rural settlements (Spanish:cantones).

San Cristóbal Cucho political division
Location type	Name
Town	San Cristóbal Cucho
Villages	Barranca Grande (Note: Currently split into Barranca Grande El Centro and Barranca Grande El Calvario. These are communities that sit at 1.753 m above sea level and are 12 km away from the municipal capital, 20 km from the department capital, San Marcos and 270 km from the nation capital, Guatemala City. Thanks to its climate, they lead the municipality on coffee, avocado, jocote, and pacaya production.)
Villages	Las Majadas
Villages	San Rafael Gautivil
Villages	Rancho del Padre
Settlements	Las Canoas
Settlements	Gautivil
Settlements	Los Escobar
Settlements	La Perla
Settlements	Ixcanante
Settlements	Las Flores
Settlements	El Parnaso
Rural settlements	La Esperanza
Rural settlements	Río Santo
Rural settlements	Los Aguilar
Rural settlements	Barrel

== Climate ==
San Cristóbal Cucho has 60% relative humidity on average and temperate climate (Köppen:Cwb).

Climate data for San Cristóbal Cucho
Month	Jan	Feb	Mar	Apr	May	Jun	Jul	Aug	Sep	Oct	Nov	Dec	Year
Mean daily maximum °C (°F)	16.9 (62.4)	17.4 (63.3)	18.9 (66.0)	20.0 (68.0)	20.2 (68.4)	19.4 (66.9)	19.3 (66.7)	19.7 (67.5)	19.2 (66.6)	18.5 (65.3)	18.0 (64.4)	17.3 (63.1)	18.7 (65.7)
Daily mean °C (°F)	9.4 (48.9)	9.8 (49.6)	11.3 (52.3)	13.0 (55.4)	14.5 (58.1)	14.5 (58.1)	14.3 (57.7)	14.1 (57.4)	14.2 (57.6)	13.4 (56.1)	11.7 (53.1)	10.5 (50.9)	12.6 (54.6)
Mean daily minimum °C (°F)	2.0 (35.6)	2.3 (36.1)	3.7 (38.7)	6.1 (43.0)	8.8 (47.8)	9.6 (49.3)	9.3 (48.7)	8.5 (47.3)	9.3 (48.7)	8.3 (46.9)	5.4 (41.7)	3.8 (38.8)	6.4 (43.5)
Average precipitation mm (inches)	6 (0.2)	6 (0.2)	27 (1.1)	68 (2.7)	242 (9.5)	359 (14.1)	271 (10.7)	298 (11.7)	345 (13.6)	236 (9.3)	23 (0.9)	14 (0.6)	1,895 (74.6)
Source: Climate-Data.org

== Geographic location ==
San Cristóbal Cucho is practically surround by San Marcos Department municipalities, except on its East side, where it borders with San Juan Ostuncalco, a Quetzaltenango municipality.

== Notes and references ==
=== Bibliography ===
- Orrego Pernia, Axel Manuel (2011). Municipio de San Cristóbal Cucho, Departamento de San Marcos: diagnóstico administrativo municipal (PDF). Ejercicio profesional supervisado (in Spanish). Guatemala: Facultad de Ciencias Económicas de la Universidad de San Carlos de Guatemala.
