= Progreso Municipality, Coahuila =

Municipality in the Mexican state of Coahuila

Progreso
- Municipality
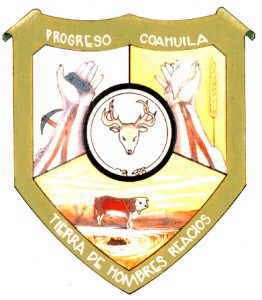
- Coat of arms

- Municipality of Progreso in Coahuila

- Location in Mexico
- Coordinates: 27°25′42″N 100°59′14″W
- Country: Mexico
- State: Coahuila
- Municipal seat: Progreso

Area
  - Total: 1,858.3 km^{2} (717.5 sq mi)

Population (2005)
  - Total: 3,379

Progreso is one of the 38 municipalities of Coahuila, in north-eastern Mexico. The municipal seat lies at Progreso. The municipality covers an area of 1818.3 km^{2}.

As of 2005, the municipality had a total population of 3,379.
