= Nuevo Progreso, Nuevo Laredo, Tamaulipas =

Nuevo Progreso El Progreso
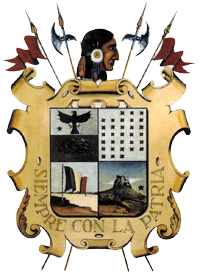
- Seal

- Location within Mexico Location within Tamaulipas
- Coordinates: 27°29′51″N 99°35′36″W
- Elevation: 150 m (490 ft)

Population (2010)
  - Total: 432
- Time zone: UTC-6 (CST)
  - Summer (DST): UTC-5 (CST)
- Codigo Postal: 88000
- Area code: +52-867
- Nearest Airports: Laredo: Laredo International Airport KLRD LRD Nuevo Laredo: Quetzalcoatl International Airport MMNL NLD

Nuevo Progreso, Tamaulipas also known as El Progreso is a community located in Nuevo Laredo Municipality in the Mexican state of Tamaulipas. According to the INEGI Census of 2010, El Progreso has a population of 432 inhabitants. Its elevation is 150 meters above sea level.
