= Progreso Independent School District =

School district in Texas, United States

Address
- 600 North Business FM 1015 Progreso, Texas, 78579; United States

District information
- Grades: PK–12
- Superintendent: Sergio Coronado
- Schools: 4
- NCES District ID: 4835910

Students and staff
- Students: 1,405 (2023–2024)
- Teachers: 99.07 (on an FTE basis)
- Student–teacher ratio: 14.18:1

Other information
- Website: www.progresoedu.net

== Introduction ==
Progreso Independent School District is a public school district based in Progreso, Texas (USA).

In addition to Progreso, the district also serves the city of Progreso Lakes.

In 2009, the school district was rated "academically acceptable" by the Texas Education Agency. In 2026, the district was rated a “B” in the A-F accountability system by TEA.

The Texas Education Agency's college readiness performance data shows that only 4% (5 out of 98 students) of the graduates of the class of 2010 of the Progreso school district met TEA's average performance criterion on SAT or ACT college admission tests. Based on TEA accountability results for 2026, Progreso ISD surpassed the state average on the TEA metric for “Scoring at or above the college ready standard on SAT, ACT, TSIA.” Students earning associates degrees before graduating from Progreso ISD was also five times higher than the state average based on the TEA accountability results for 2026.

== Schools ==
- Progreso High School (Grades 9-12)
  - The school mascot is the red ant (the only school in Texas with this mascot)
- Dorothy Thompson Middle School (Grades 6-8)
- Progreso Elementary School (Grades 1-6)
- Progreso Early Childhood Center (Grades PK-K)
