= Progreso, Coahuila =

City in the Mexican state of Coahuila

Progreso
- Municipal seat and city
- Location in Mexico
- Coordinates: 27°25′N 100°59′W
- Country: Mexico
- State: Coahuila
- Municipality: Progreso

Population (2010)
  - Total: 796

Progreso is a city and seat of the municipality of Progreso, in the north-eastern Mexican state of Coahuila.

== Climate ==
Climate data for Progreso (1991–2020)
Month	Jan	Feb	Mar	Apr	May	Jun	Jul	Aug	Sep	Oct	Nov	Dec	Year
Record high °C (°F)	37.5 (99.5)	42.5 (108.5)	42.0 (107.6)	45.5 (113.9)	46.0 (114.8)	46.0 (114.8)	45.5 (113.9)	45.0 (113.0)	44.0 (111.2)	42.0 (107.6)	45.0 (113.0)	45.0 (113.0)	46.0 (114.8)
Mean daily maximum °C (°F)	20.5 (68.9)	23.6 (74.5)	27.5 (81.5)	31.5 (88.7)	34.6 (94.3)	37.2 (99.0)	37.2 (99.0)	37.7 (99.9)	34.0 (93.2)	30.0 (86.0)	24.9 (76.8)	21.6 (70.9)	30.0 (86.0)
Daily mean °C (°F)	12.5 (54.5)	15.2 (59.4)	18.9 (66.0)	22.8 (73.0)	27.0 (80.6)	30.0 (86.0)	30.2 (86.4)	30.4 (86.7)	27.2 (81.0)	22.5 (72.5)	17.1 (62.8)	13.5 (56.3)	22.3 (72.1)
Mean daily minimum °C (°F)	4.5 (40.1)	6.9 (44.4)	10.3 (50.5)	14.1 (57.4)	19.5 (67.1)	22.7 (72.9)	23.1 (73.6)	23.1 (73.6)	20.5 (68.9)	15.0 (59.0)	9.3 (48.7)	5.3 (41.5)	14.5 (58.1)
Record low °C (°F)	−12.0 (10.4)	−10.0 (14.0)	−5.0 (23.0)	0.0 (32.0)	0.0 (32.0)	8.0 (46.4)	6.0 (42.8)	3.0 (37.4)	−2.0 (28.4)	1.0 (33.8)	−5.0 (23.0)	−9.0 (15.8)	−12.0 (10.4)
Average precipitation mm (inches)	13.3 (0.52)	10.7 (0.42)	21.6 (0.85)	21.9 (0.86)	43.7 (1.72)	37.2 (1.46)	58.6 (2.31)	30.1 (1.19)	73.9 (2.91)	34.9 (1.37)	16.3 (0.64)	14.3 (0.56)	376.5 (14.81)
Average precipitation days (≥ 0.1 mm)	4.1	3.8	3.7	3.5	5.3	3.4	3.4	3.4	5.6	3.8	3.5	3.4	46.9
Source: Servicio Meteorologico Nacional
