= Nuevo Progreso, Río Bravo, Tamaulipas =

Town in Tamaulipas, Mexico

Nuevo Progreso
- City and municipality
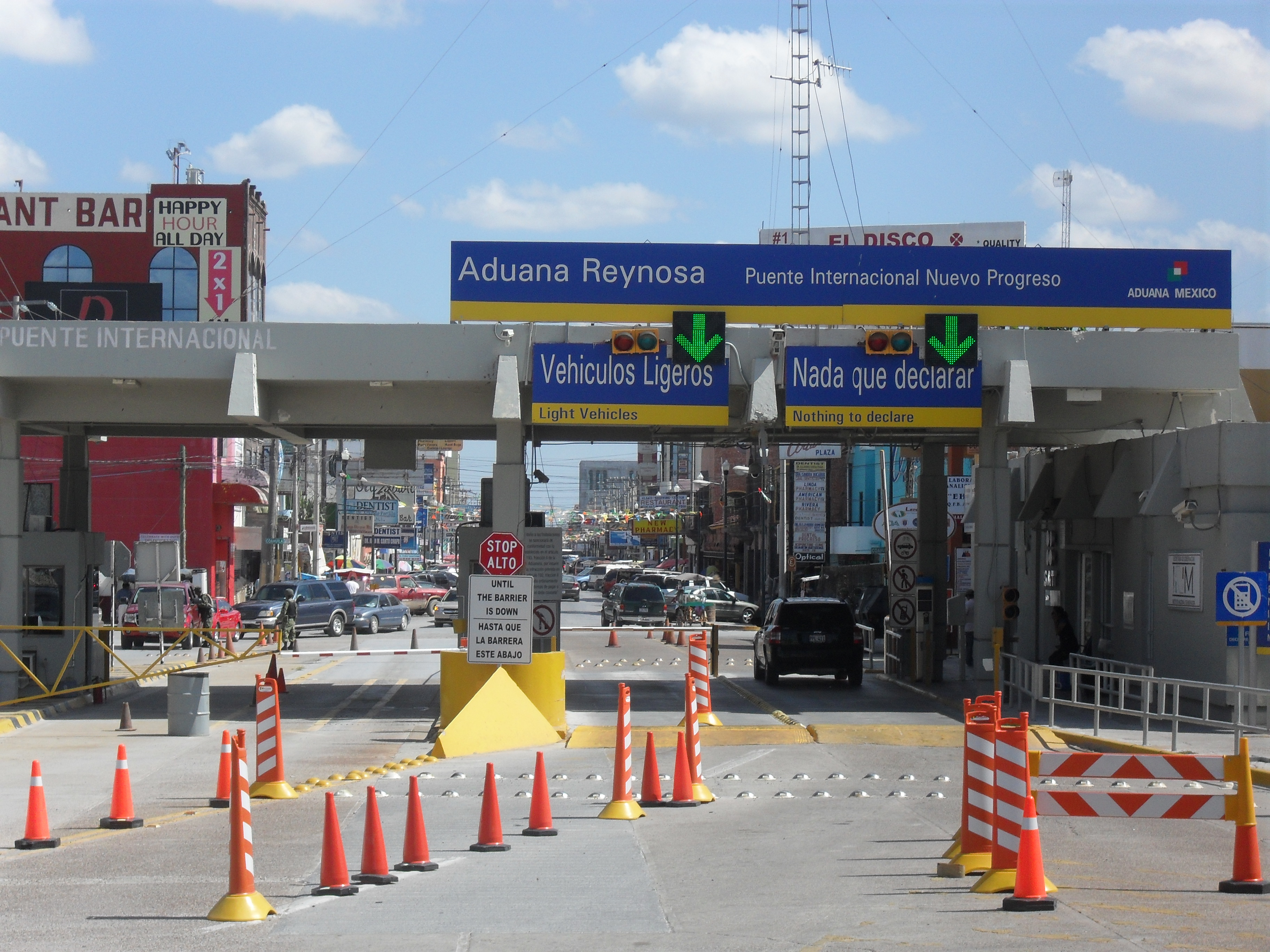
- Entrance

- Location within Tamaulipas Location within Mexico
- Coordinates: 26.0561°N 97.9522°W
- Country: Mexico
- State: Tamaulipas
- Municipality: Río Bravo

Population (2020)
  - Total: 10,272

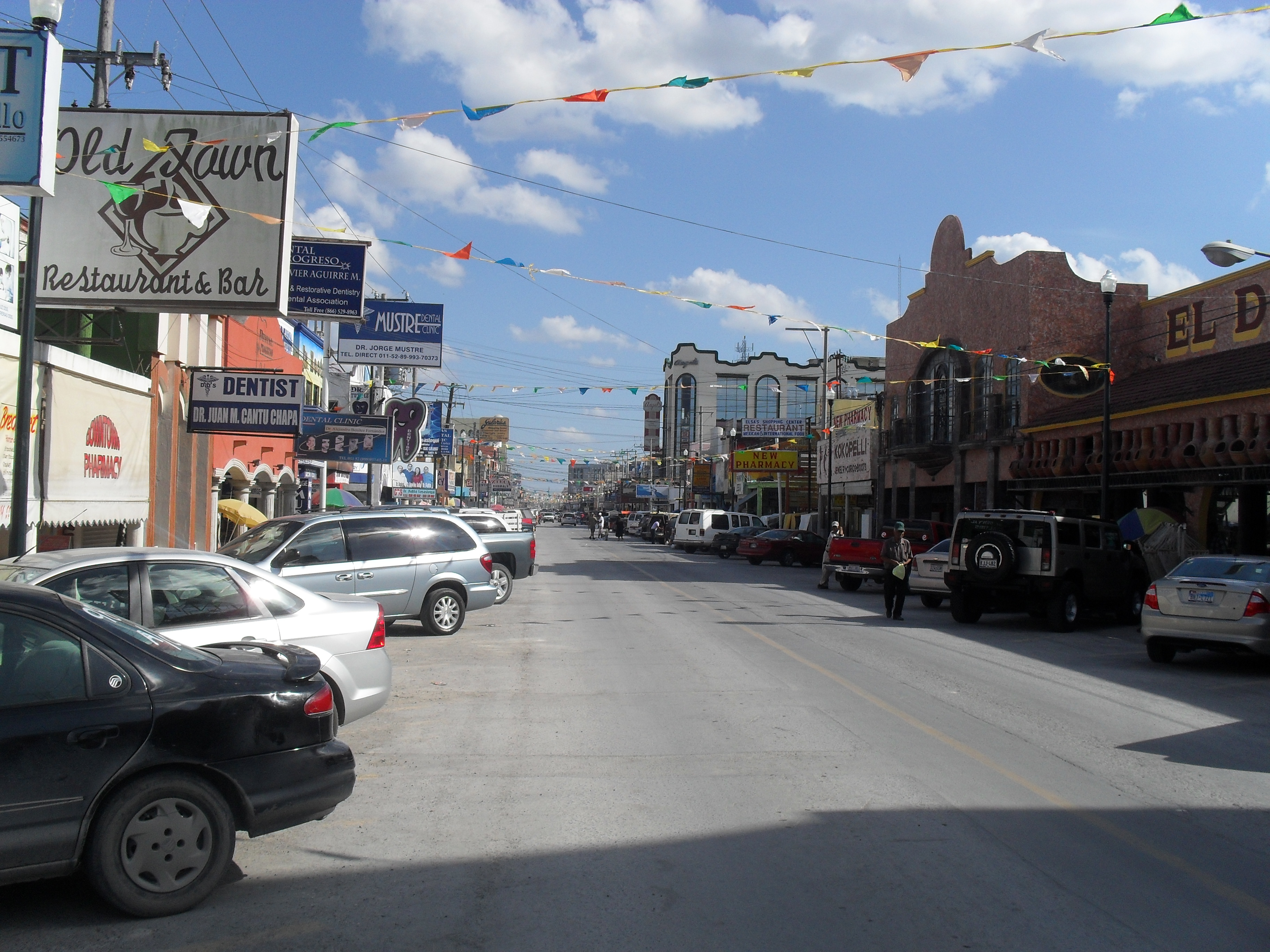
Benito Juarez in Nuevo Progreso

Nuevo Progreso, Tamaulipas is a Mexican town in Río Bravo Municipality in the state of Tamaulipas located on the U.S.-Mexican border, a part of the binational Reynosa–McAllen metropolitan area. The Progreso-Nuevo Progreso International Bridge connects the town with Progreso Lakes, Texas. The 2010 census showed a population of 10,178 inhabitants.

Nuevo Progreso is known as one of the safest border towns in Tamaulipas, and is a popular medical tourism destination. There are over 100 dentists and 100 pharmacies in the five-block center of Nuevo Progreso. Nuevo Progreso is not a major trade route for commerce, and most tourists cross the border on foot. In addition to medical services, Nuevo Progreso also has restaurants and shops.
