= Nuevo Progreso, San Marcos =

Nuevo Progreso
- Location in Guatemala
- Coordinates: 14°47′32″N 91°55′15″W
- Country: Guatemala
- Department: San Marcos

Government
  - Mayor: Eluminio Cifuentes (Partido Patriota)
- Climate: Am

Nuevo Progreso (Spanish pronunciation: [ˈnweβo pɾoˈɣɾeso]) is a municipality in the San Marcos department of Guatemala.

== History ==
The municipality was created on 17 October 1889 as "El Progreso'. After the murder of president general José María Reina Barrios on 8 February 1898, lawyer Manuel Estrada Cabrera reached power and from the very beginning of his tenure he set up a dictatorial rule, which would last 22 years. The president admirers began a program by which numerous locations and structures were named after the Presidente, and then El Progreso became "Estrada Cabrera" in 1898.

In 1908, following with the adulation program, the municipality was renamed, this time as "San Joaquin", a male version of Estrada Cabrera's mother name, Joaquina Cabrera -who had died on 3 July 1908- during the Fiestas Minervalias on 4 November 1908. Finally, it was named "Nuevo Progreso" on 3 May 1920, by president Carlos Herrera y Luna, who issued an executive order to remove all references to Estrada Cabrera and his mother after the former president ousting on 17 April 1920.

Nuevo Progreso is also known as "El Valle Escondido" (English: "The hidden valley") of the San Marcos Department coast.

=== Name changes over the years ===
#	Name	Begin date	End date
1.	El Progreso	17 October 1889	1898
2.	Estrada Cabrera	1898	4 November 1898
3.	San Joaquín	4 November 1908	3 May 1920
4.	Nuevo Progreso	3 May 1920	Current name

== Health system ==
Nuevo Progreso is most well known for the "Hospital de la Familia" located there. Medical specialists from the United States visit to offer care to those in need. When the specialists are in town, people often visit from across the country because of the expert care they can receive.

== Climate ==
Nuevo Progreso has tropical climate(Köppen:Am).

Climate data for Nuevo Progreso
Month	Jan	Feb	Mar	Apr	May	Jun	Jul	Aug	Sep	Oct	Nov	Dec	Year
Mean daily maximum °C (°F)	30.2 (86.4)	30.6 (87.1)	32.0 (89.6)	31.8 (89.2)	31.5 (88.7)	30.3 (86.5)	30.9 (87.6)	31.1 (88.0)	30.4 (86.7)	30.2 (86.4)	30.1 (86.2)	30.0 (86.0)	30.8 (87.4)
Daily mean °C (°F)	24.2 (75.6)	24.4 (75.9)	25.7 (78.3)	26.0 (78.8)	26.0 (78.8)	25.3 (77.5)	25.4 (77.7)	25.6 (78.1)	25.4 (77.7)	25.1 (77.2)	24.8 (76.6)	24.3 (75.7)	25.2 (77.3)
Mean daily minimum °C (°F)	18.2 (64.8)	18.3 (64.9)	19.4 (66.9)	20.2 (68.4)	20.5 (68.9)	20.3 (68.5)	20.0 (68.0)	20.2 (68.4)	20.4 (68.7)	20.1 (68.2)	19.5 (67.1)	18.6 (65.5)	19.6 (67.4)
Average precipitation mm (inches)	33 (1.3)	37 (1.5)	96 (3.8)	250 (9.8)	473 (18.6)	623 (24.5)	488 (19.2)	575 (22.6)	697 (27.4)	643 (25.3)	195 (7.7)	60 (2.4)	4,170 (164.1)
Source: Climate-Data.org

== Geographic location ==
It is surrounded by San Marcos Department municipalities, except on the South, where it borders Coatepeque, a Quetzaltenango municipality.

== See also ==
- La Aurora International Airport
- Manuel Estrada Cabrera
- Tapachula International Airport
