= KNEX =

KNEX may refer to:

- KNEX (FM), a radio station (106.1 FM) licensed to Laredo, Texas, United States
- KYLX-LD, a low-power television station (channel 13) licensed to Laredo, Texas, United States, which used the call sign KNEX-LP from 2002 through 2015
- K'Nex, a construction toy
