= KXOF =

KXOF may refer to:

- KXOF-CD, a low-power television station (channel 31) licensed to serve Laredo, Texas, United States
- KETF-CD, a low-power television station (channel 27, virtual 39) licensed to serve Laredo, Texas, which held the call signs KXOF-CA or KXOF-CD from 2007 to 2018
