= CBS 13 =

CBS 13 may refer to any of the following CBS affiliates:

== Currently affiliated ==
=== Owned-and-operated stations ===
- KOVR in Sacramento, California
- WJZ-TV in Baltimore, Maryland

=== Affiliated stations ===
- KLBK-TV in Lubbock, Texas
- KOGG-DT3 in Wailuku, Hawaii
  - Re-broadcast of KGMB in Honolulu, Hawaii
- KOLD-TV in Tucson, Arizona
- KRCG in Columbia–Jefferson City, Missouri
- KSIX-DT3 in Hilo, Hawaii
  - Re-broadcast of KGMB in Honolulu, Hawaii
- KXDF-CD in Fairbanks, Alaska
- KVAL-TV in Eugene, Oregon
- KYLX-LD in Laredo, Texas
- KYMA-DT in Yuma, Arizona–El Centro, California
- WBTW in Florence–Myrtle Beach, South Carolina
- WGME-TV in Portland, Maine
- WIBW-TV in Topeka, Kansas
- WLOX-DT2 in Biloxi, Mississippi
- WMAZ-TV in Macon, Georgia
- WOWK-TV in Huntington–Charleston, West Virginia
- WVTM-DT4 in Birmingham, Alabama

== Formerly affiliated ==
- KHOL-TV (now KHGI-TV) in Kearney, Nebraska (1953–1961)
- KRQE in Albuquerque, New Mexico (1953–2026)
- KTNL-TV in Sitka, Alaska (1966–2009, moved to channel 7)
- KVTV in Laredo, Texas (1973–2015)
- KXMC-TV in Minot, North Dakota (1953–2026)
- WAFM-TV/WABT/WAPI-TV (now WVTM-TV in Birmingham, Alabama (primarily from 1949–1954 and secondarily from 1965–1970)
- WHIO-TV, Dayton, Ohio (1949–1952, now on channel 7)
- WAST/WNYT in Albany, New York (1954–1955 and 1977–1981)
- WHBQ-TV in Memphis, Tennessee (1953–1956)
- WREX in Rockford, Illinois (1953–1965)
- WSET-TV in Lynchburg–Roanoke, Virginia (1953–1954)
- WTVT in Tampa–St. Petersburg, Florida (1955–1994)
