= Fox 39 =

Fox 39 may refer to the following television stations in the U.S. affiliated with Fox:

== Current ==
- KFXO-CD in Bend, Oregon
- KJNB-CD in Jonesboro, Arkansas
- WCYB-DT3, a digital channel of WCYB-TV in Bristol, Virginia (branded as Fox 39 Tri-Cities)
- WQRF-TV in Rockford, Illinois

== Former ==
- KXOF-CA/CD (now KETF-CD) in Laredo, Texas (2007–2018)
- WEMT in Greeneville, Tennessee (1986–2025)
