= Aguilares =

Aguilares may refer to:

- Aguilares, Argentina
- Aguilares, El Salvador
- Aguilares, Texas, United States
