= KXNU-CD =

Television station in Laredo, Texas

- Laredo, Texas; United States
- City: Laredo, Texas
- Channels: Digital: 10 (VHF); Virtual: 10
- Branding: Telemundo Laredo; Telenoticias Laredo (newscasts)

Programming
- Affiliations: 10.1: Telemundo; 10.2: CBS (KYLX-CD simulcast)

Ownership
- Owner: Gray Media; (Gray Television Licensee, LLC)
- Sister stations: KGNS-TV, KYLX-CD

History
- Founded: August 25, 2009
- First air date: July 12, 2011
- Former call signs: K10QK-D (2011–2018); KXNU-LD (2018–2025)

Technical information
- Licensing authority: FCC
- Facility ID: 181808
- Class: CD
- ERP: 3 kW
- HAAT: 277.6 m (911 ft)
- Transmitter coordinates: 27°40′22″N 99°39′52″W
- Translator(s): KGNS-TV 8.3 (8.5 VHF) Laredo

Links
- Public license information: Public file; LMS
- Website: www.telemundolaredo.tv

KXNU-CD (channel 10) is a low-power, Class A television station in Laredo, Texas, United States, affiliated with the Spanish-language network Telemundo. It is owned by Gray Media alongside dual NBC/ABC affiliate KGNS-TV (channel 8) and dual CBS/CW+ affiliate KYLX-CD (channel 13). The three stations share studios on Loop 20 (near SH 359) in Laredo and transmitter facilities on FM 1472 northwest of the city.

== History ==
KGNS launched a subchannel affiliated with Telemundo in November 2007. This station went on the air on July 12, 2011, as K10QK-D, owned by SagamoreHill Broadcasting and simulcasting KGNS-TV's third subchannel. It was sold to Gray Television on December 31, 2013, along with KGNS-TV. On October 4, 2018, the station's call sign was changed to KXNU-LD.

== Newscasts ==
In 2009, KGNS–Telemundo began airing evening news breaks hosted by Lupita Benavides, previously of KLDO. KGNS began airing a 10 p.m. local newscast for Telemundo under the title Telenoticias Laredo on November 18, 2010. This followed the debut of another program, Telemundo Laredo En tu Casa, on Sunday mornings. In 2018, KLDO ceased producing its own local newscasts, leaving Telenoticias as the only Spanish-language news produced in Laredo.

On October 10, 2022, KXNU started airing a statewide morning newscast, Noticias Telemundo Texas, which aired from 5 to 7 a.m. on weekdays. The program was produced out of KXTX-TV's studios in Fort Worth. On November 1, 2024, Noticias Telemundo Texas was discontinued.

== Subchannels ==
The station's signal is multiplexed:

Subchannels of KXNU-CD
Channel	Short name	Programming
10.1	KXNULP1	Telemundo
10.2	KXNULP2	CBS (KYLX-CD)

Simulcast of subchannels of another station
