= KBDR =

Radio station in Mirando City–Laredo, Texas

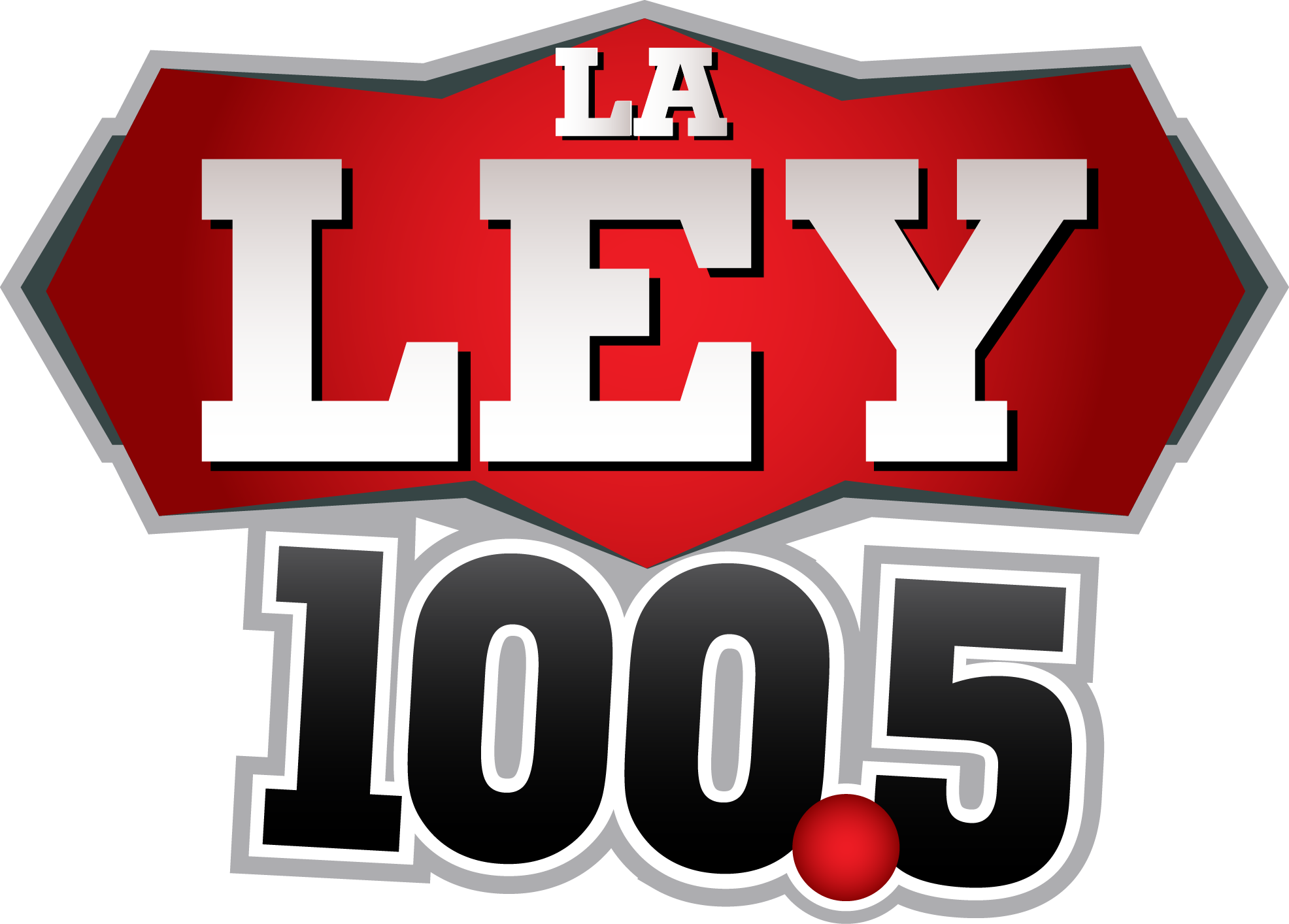
- Mirando City, Texas; United States
- Broadcast area: Laredo, Texas; Nuevo Laredo, Tamaulipas
- Frequency: 100.5 MHz
- Branding: La Ley 100.5 FM

Programming
- Format: Regional Mexican

Ownership
- Owner: Radio United; (Leading Media Group Corp.)
- Sister stations: XHBK-FM; KQUR; KNEX;

History
- Former call signs: KZZQ (1988-93)
- Call sign meaning: "Border"

Technical information
- Licensing authority: FCC
- Facility ID: 906
- Class: Mirando City: C2; Laredo: D (Booster)
- ERP: 42,000 watts
- HAAT: 163 meters (535 ft)

Links
- Public license information: Public file; LMS
- Webcast: Listen Live
- Website: laley1005.com

KBDR (branded as La Ley 100.5 FM) is a regional Mexican format FM radio station that serves the Laredo, Texas, United States and Nuevo Laredo, Tamaulipas, Mexico border area. The main station broadcasts from Mirando City, Texas with 42 kW power, and a booster station (KBDR-FM1), which is located in Laredo, Texas with a broadcast power of 10 kW.

== Transmitter locations ==
KBDR-FM "Mirando City" Main: 27.355037°N 99.231467°W
KBDR-FM1 Laredo Booster: 27.524641°N 99.52247°W
