= KGNS-TV =

Television station in Laredo, Texas

- Laredo, Texas; Nuevo Laredo, Tamaulipas; United States–Mexico
- City: Laredo, Texas
- Channels: Digital: 8 (VHF); Virtual: 8
- Branding: KGNS; ABC Laredo (8.2); Telemundo Laredo (8.3)

Programming
- Affiliations: 8.1: NBC; 8.2: ABC; 8.3: Telemundo; for others, see § Subchannels

Ownership
- Owner: Gray Media; (Gray Television Licensee, LLC)
- Sister stations: KXNU-CD, KYLX-CD

History
- First air date: January 4, 1956
- Former call signs: KHAD-TV (1956–1958)
- Former channel numbers: Analog: 8 (VHF, 1956–2009); Digital: 15 (UHF, 2002–2009)
- Former affiliations: CBS (secondary, 1956–1973); ABC (secondary, 1956–1984); UPN (secondary 1998–2004; per program after 2000); The CW (8.2, 2006–2014)
- Call sign meaning: Your Good Neighbor Station

Technical information
- Licensing authority: FCC
- Facility ID: 10061
- ERP: 20 kW
- HAAT: 312 m (1,024 ft)
- Transmitter coordinates: 27°40′22″N 99°39′52″W

Links
- Public license information: Public file; LMS
- Website: kgns.tv

KGNS-TV (channel 8) is a television station in Laredo, Texas, United States, affiliated with NBC and ABC. It is owned by Gray Media alongside two other low-power, Class A stations: dual CBS/CW+ affiliate KYLX-CD (channel 13) and Telemundo affiliate KXNU-CD (channel 10). The three stations share studios on Loop 20 (near SH 359) in Laredo and transmitter facilities on FM 1472 northwest of the city.

== History ==
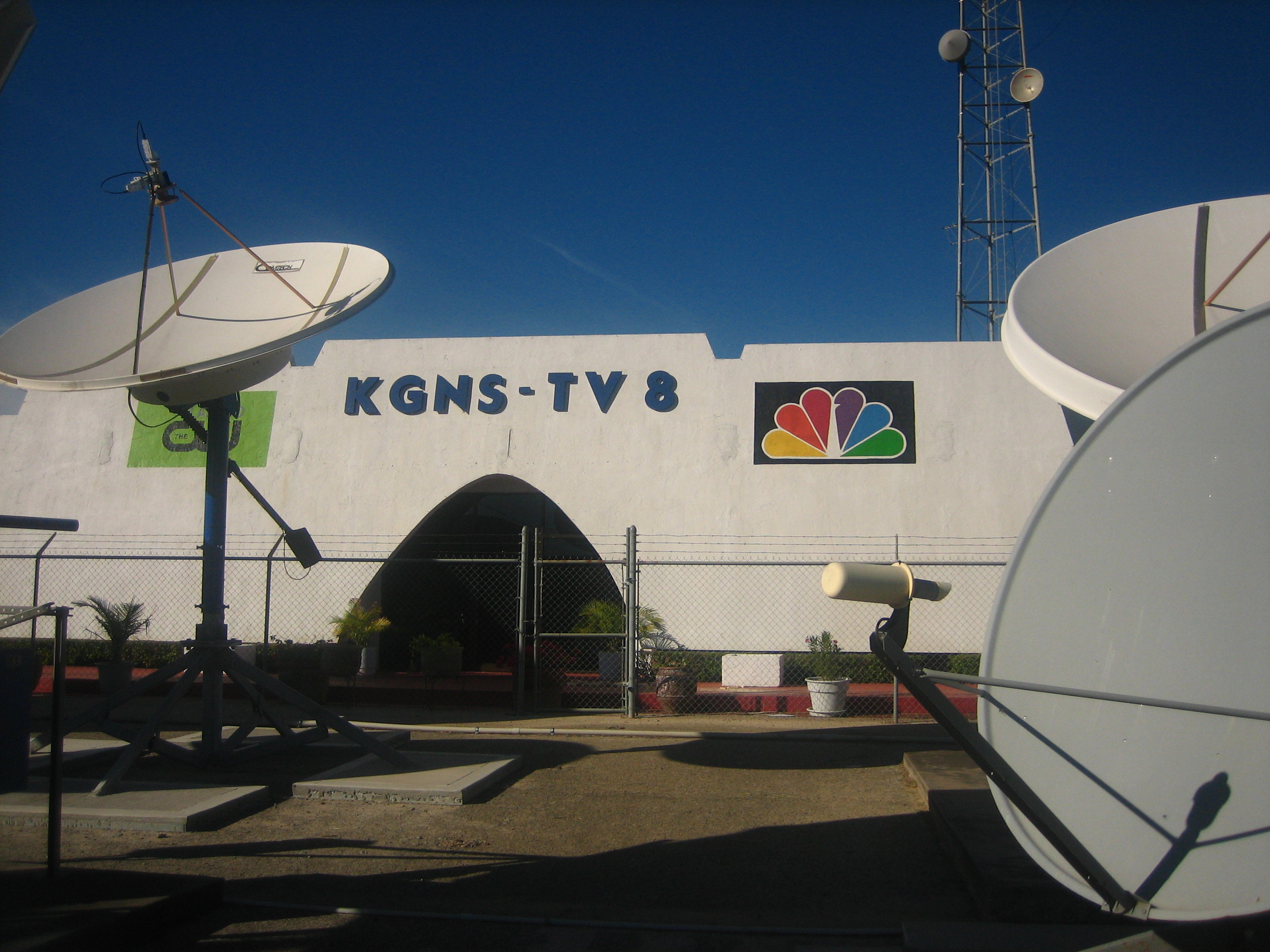
KGNS former studios on Del Mar Boulevard, near the intersection of Interstate 35.

KGNS originally went on air January 4, 1956, as KHAD-TV. It has been a primary NBC affiliate since its sign on, but initially held secondary affiliations with CBS and ABC. CBS programming moved to KVTV in December 1973 (which went dark in 2015) and ABC programming moved to present-day Univision affiliate KLDO-TV in December 1984, making KGNS an exclusive NBC affiliate.

Donrey Media Group (now Stephens Media Group) bought the station on September 1, 1958. One of its first moves was to change the station's call letters. Donrey held a contest in which elementary and middle school students from both sides of the Rio Grande region got to choose a new callsign; the current KGNS-TV (standing for "Good Neighbor Station").

On March 14, 1987, KGNS was purchased by Century Development Corporation. In 1990, the station began a Spanish language newscast.

By 1998, KGNS gained a secondary affiliation with the United Paramount Network (UPN), lasting at least until 2000, while definitively off the station by 2004, then moved to cable only as KTXW (Time Warner Cable channel 16). In 2000, the WB affiliate in the market was cable-only KTXW, and its successor network, The CW was carried on the .2 subchannel, which now carries ABC.

In 2004, the station was purchased by SagamoreHill Broadcasting. The sale was approved by the Federal Communications Commission on December 1, 2005.

On January 24, 2006, The WB and CBS Corporation-owned UPN announced that the two networks would cease broadcasting and merge into a new broadcast network called The CW. On September 18, 2006, KGNS-TV rebranded KTXW as The CW Laredo. With the subsequent sign-on of digital subchannel 8.2, the subchannel began broadcasting KTXW, bringing the channel over-the-air coverage throughout the market. In 2010, local Spanish language news returned to the station on Telemundo affiliated subchannel 3.

In May 2013, SagamoreHill Broadcasting reached a deal to sell KGNS, along with KGWN-TV in Cheyenne, Wyoming, and KSTF in Scottsbluff, Nebraska, to Yellowstone Holdings, a subsidiary of Frontier Radio Management. On November 4, 2013, Gray Television announced a deal to acquire Yellowstone Holdings for $23 million. The sale was completed on December 31.

On November 6, 2013, KGNS-TV reached an agreement with ABC to become affiliated, originally slated to launch in February 2014 on channel 8.2. The ABC affiliation began on July 1, 2014, making The CW available in Laredo exclusively on Time Warner Cable via the national feed of The CW Plus; ABC network programming had been provided on cable via KSAT-TV in San Antonio or KIII in Corpus Christi since KLDO-TV lost its ABC affiliation in 1988. CW programming would not be seen over the air in Laredo area until October 2015, as KYLX-LP picked up the affiliation.

On November 11, 2023, KGNS moved its operations from its studios on Del Mar Boulevard to a building located at Loop 20, which was previously used by Entravision-owned KLDO-TV.

== News operation ==
Since CBS affiliate KVTV shut down its news department in 2006, KGNS has operated the market's only English-language news department. It currently airs three hours of newscasts every weekday and one hour per day on weekends. According to Nielsen Media Research, KGNS competes closely with Spanish-language station KLDO.

In 1990, the station began a Spanish language newscast at 5 p.m. called Noticias en Español with news anchor Hector Lerma. On April 29, 2002, the Spanish news staff resigned from the station, forcing them to run a sitcom in that time slot. KGNS eventually replaced the Spanish news broadcast with English language news on March 1 of the following year. In 2010, local Spanish language news returned to the station on Telemundo affiliated subchannel 8.3. Initially, there was a Sunday morning show, Telemundo Laredo...En tu Casa, then coverage was expanded on November 18, 2010, with a weeknight 10 p.m. show.

On June 21, 2008, KGNS-TV began producing a weeknight, 9 p.m. newscast on its CW-affiliated second digital subchannel titled Laredo's First News at 9. This program was the only prime time newscast in the Laredo-Nuevo Laredo market until Fox affiliate KXOF-CA launched a competing 9 p.m. newscast on April 9, 2012. The half-hour newscast is anchored by Brenda Medina and Ryan Bailey. This newscast was targeted at young adults between the ages of 21 and 34.

== Technical information ==
=== Subchannels ===
The station's signal is multiplexed:

Subchannels of KGNS-TV
Channel	Res.	Short name	Programming
8.1	1080i	KGNS-TV	NBC
8.2	720p	ABC	ABC
8.3	720p	TELEMUN	Telemundo (KXNU-CD)
8.4	480i		Ion
8.5	480i	Justice	True Crime Network
8.6	480i		Ion Plus

Simulcast of subchannels of another station

=== Analog-to-digital conversion ===
On April 8, 2004, KGNS-TV launched its digital signal on UHF channel 15, becoming the first television station in the Laredo market to operate a digital broadcast television signal. KGNS-TV discontinued its analog signal and began broadcasting exclusively digital on June 12, 2009. The station vacated its pre-transition digital channel 15, and moved its digital channel allocation to its former analog VHF channel 8. KGNS-TV began broadcasting high-definition programming on its digital signal in October 2008.

== See also ==
- Channel 8 digital TV stations in the United States
- Channel 8 virtual TV stations in the United States
