= CW 13 =

CW 13 may refer to one of two television stations in the United States affiliated with the CW television network:

== Current ==
- KCWY-DT2 in Casper, Wyoming
- KXMC-DT2 in Minot North Dakota (O&O; moves to DT1 on August 1, 2026)
- KYLX-DT2 in Laredo, Texas
- WBKO-DT3 in Bowling Green, Kentucky
- WHAM-DT2 in Rochester, New York
- WMAZ-DT2 in Macon, Georgia
- WTVG-DT2 Toledo, Ohio
- WBZV in Zanesville, Ohio (cable-only affiliate)

== Former ==
- WSCG in Savannah, Georgia (2006–2016; formerly branded by its cable channel number as CW 13)
