= Oilton =

Oilton can refer to:

- Oilton, Oklahoma
- Oilton, Texas
