= KZLD =

KZLD may refer to:

- KZLD-LP, a low-power radio station (95.3 FM) licensed to serve Houston, Texas, United States
- KXOF-CD, a low-power television station (channel 31) licensed to serve Laredo, Texas, which held the call sign KZLD-LP from 1999 to 2005
