= Webb Consolidated Independent School District =

School district in Texas, United States

Webb Consolidated Independent School District WCISD
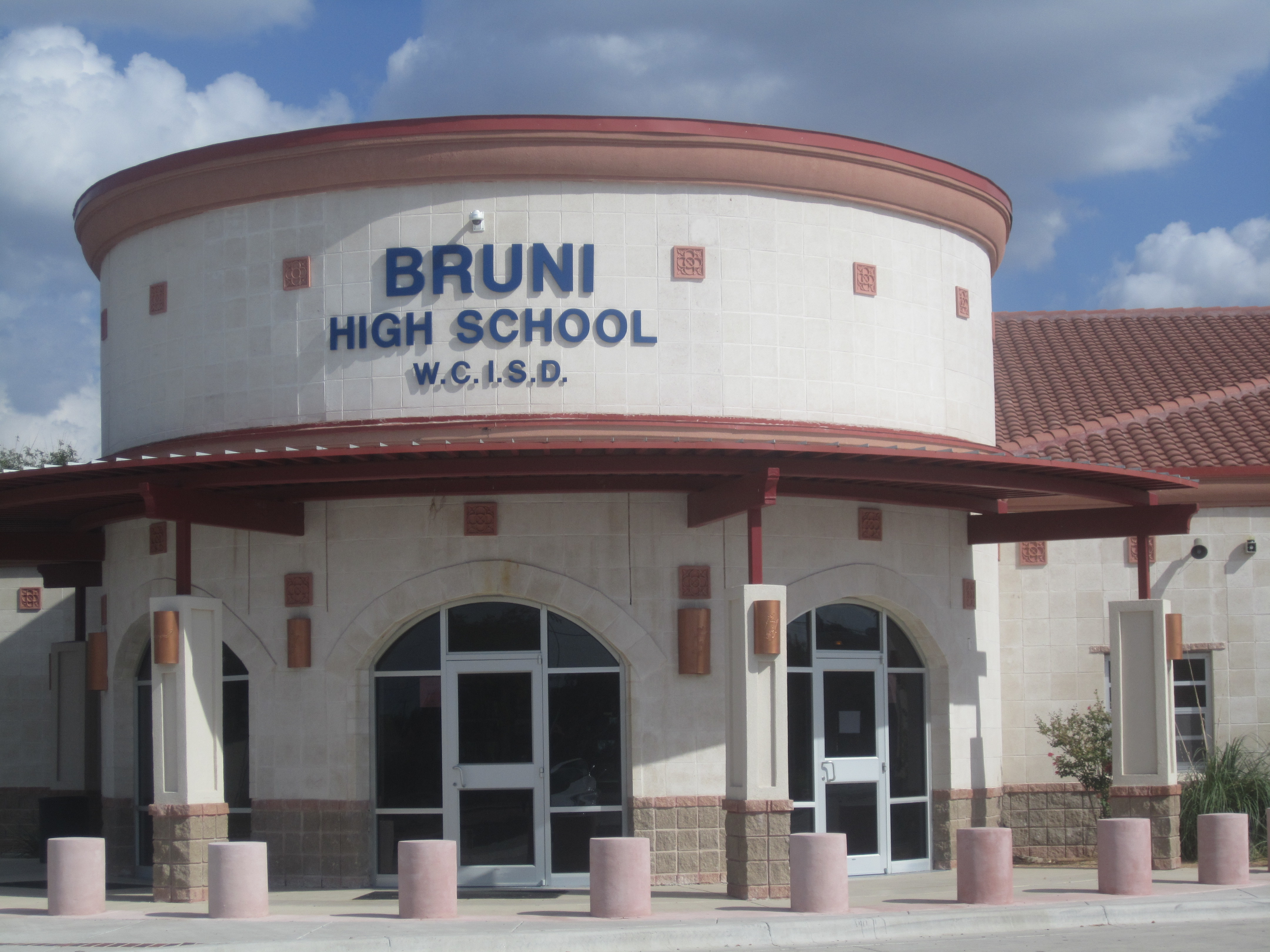
- Bruni High School

Address
- 619 Avenue F Bruni Bruni, Webb County, Texas, 78344; United States

District information
- Grades: PK–12
- Accreditation: Texas Education Agency (rated "recognized" in 2009)
- Schools: Bruni High School (Grades 9-12), Bruni Middle School (Grades 6-8), Oilton Elementary School (Grades K-5)
- NCES District ID: 4844810

Students and staff
- Students: 256 (2023–2024)
- Teachers: 27.48 (on an FTE basis)
- Student–teacher ratio: 9.32:1

Other information
- Website: webbcisd.org

Webb Consolidated Independent School District (WCISD) is a school district based in Bruni, a community in unincorporated Webb County, Texas, United States.

WCISD serves the unincorporated communities of Bruni, Aguilares, Mirando City, and Oilton.

In 2009, the school district was rated "recognized" by the Texas Education Agency.

== History ==
Prior to 1994 Webb CISD served only Bruni and Oilton. Mirando City Independent School District served the community of Mirando City from 1923 to 2005. Prior to 1994 all Mirando City children attended Mirando City ISD schools. After spring 1994, Mirando High School closed. Therefore, from Fall 1994 to July 1, 2005, WCISD served high schoolers from Mirando City while Mirando Elementary School in the Mirando City ISD served students from kindergarten through 8th grade. On May 9, 2005 the Texas Education Agency ordered the closure of Mirando City ISD. The district closed on July 1, 2005, and all students were rezoned to Webb CISD schools.

== School uniforms ==
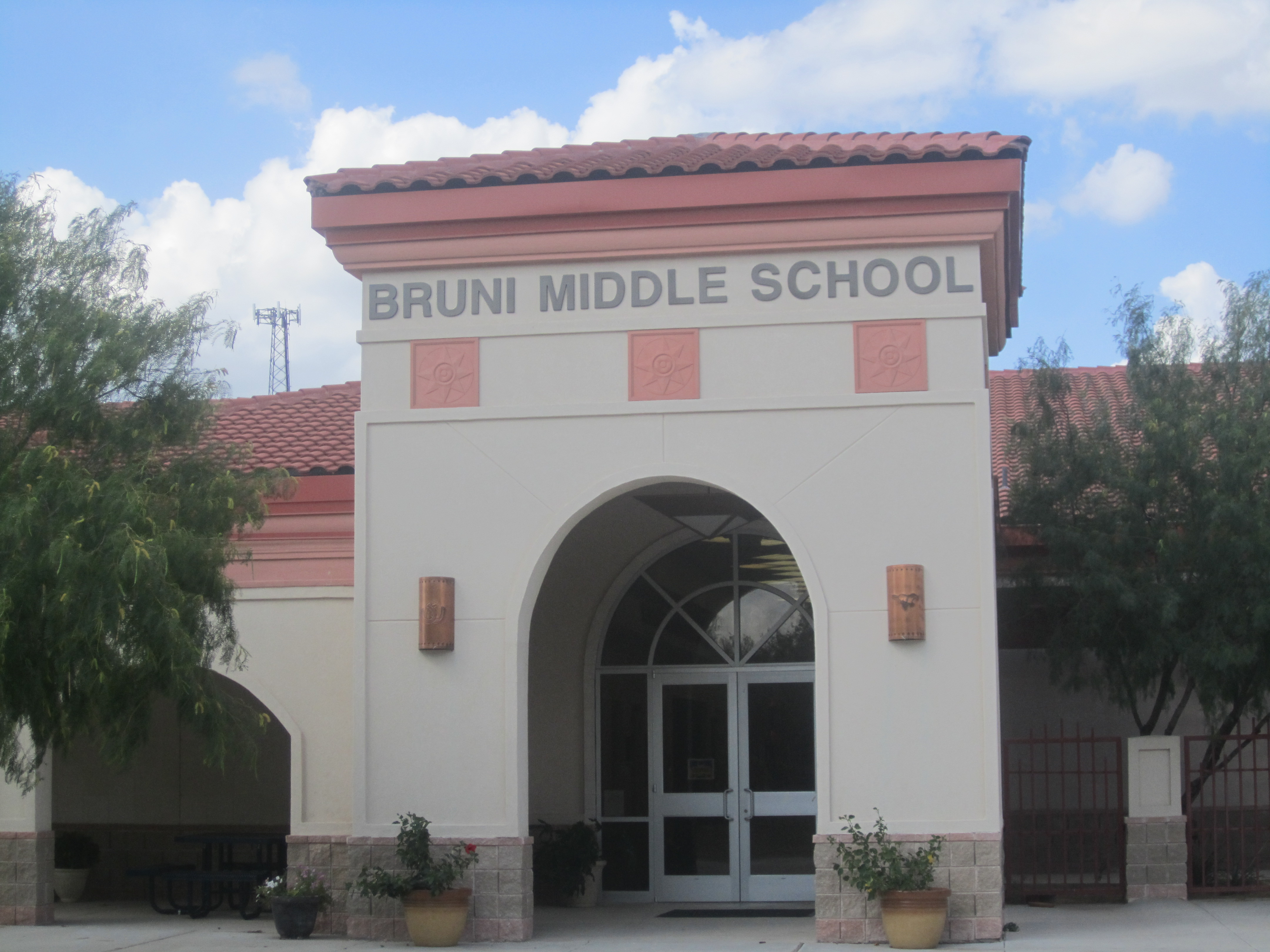
Bruni Middle School

The district requires its students to wear school uniforms (yellow polos with khaki pants, blue jeans or shorts in middle school and blue polos and khaki pants, blue jeans, or shorts in elementary and high school).

The Texas Education Agency specifies that the parents and/or guardians of students zoned to a school with uniforms may apply for a waiver to opt out of the uniform policy so their children do not have to wear the uniform; parents must specify "bona fide" reasons, such as religious reasons or philosophical objections.

== Schools ==
- Bruni High School (Grades 9-12)
- Bruni Middle School (Grades 6-8)
- Oilton Elementary School (Grades K-5)
  - 2006 National Blue Ribbon School
