= Bruni High School =

Public school in Bruni, Texas, United States

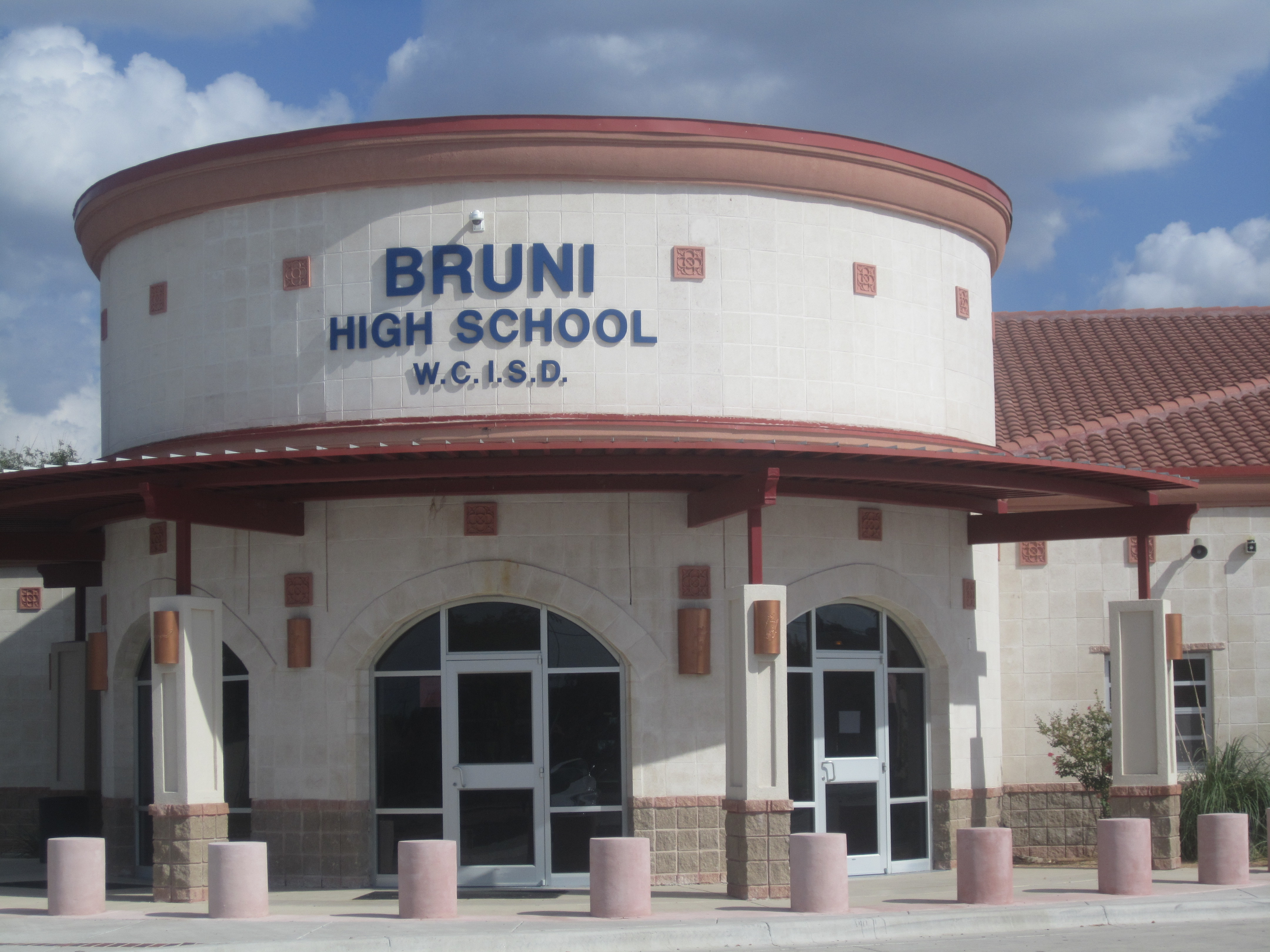

Location
- 619 Avenue F Bruni, Texas 78344; United States
- Coordinates: 27.4280°N 98.8360°W

Information
- School type: Public
- School district: Webb Consolidated Independent School District
- Principal: Gaby Perez
- Teaching staff: 12.48 (on FTE basis)
- Grades: 9-12
- Enrollment: 80 (2023-2024)
- Student to teacher ratio: 6.41
- Colors: Blue and gold
- Athletics conference: UIL 1A
- Mascot: Badger
- Website: Bruni High School

Bruni High School is a public high school serving students grades 9 to 12 located in the Bruni Census-designated place in Webb County, Texas, United States. As part of the Webb Consolidated Independent School District, it is zoned to and attended by students in unincorporated Webb County, including Mirando City, Oilton, Aguilares, and Los Ojuelos. It participates in UIL region 2A. In 2022, the school received a B rating from the Texas Education Agency.

== Athletics ==
The Bruni Badgers participate in the following sports:

- Baseball
- Basketball
- Cross country
- Football
- Golf
- Soccer
- Softball
- Swimming
- Tennis
- Track and field
- Volleyball

=== State championships ===
- Track and Field –
  - 2023 (2A)
