= Mirando City Independent School District =

Former school district in Texas, United States

Mirando City Independent School District (MCISD) was a school district located in unincorporated Webb County, Texas, United States. At the end of the district's life, it consisted of one school named Mirando Elementary School, a K-8 school located in the Mirando City community.

== History ==
Mirando ISD was established in March 1923. The state accredited the high school in 1930. Prior to 1994 Webb CISD served only Bruni and Oilton. MCISD served the community of Mirando City from 1923 to 2005. Prior to 1994 all Mirando City children attended Mirando City ISD schools. After the spring of 1994, Mirando High School closed. Therefore, from Fall 1994 to July 1, 2005, WCISD served high schoolers from Mirando City while Mirando Elementary School in the Mirando City ISD served students from kindergarten through 8th grade. On May 9, 2005 the Texas Education Agency ordered the closure of Mirando City ISD. The district closed on July 1, 2005, and all students were rezoned to Webb CISD schools.

The former high school was not used for any purpose. In 2020 the former high school was damaged in an arson attack. Law enforcement accused three juveniles of the act.

== Demographics ==
In the 2002-2003 school year MCISD had 49 students in one school. The Texas Comptroller of Public Accounts stated that the district was "very small."

== Schools ==
Schools open at the time of closure:

- Mirando Elementary School

Schools closed prior to dissolution:

- Mirando High School

== See also ==
- List of school districts in Texas
- Non-high school district (post-1994 period)
