= KQUR =

Radio station in Laredo, Texas

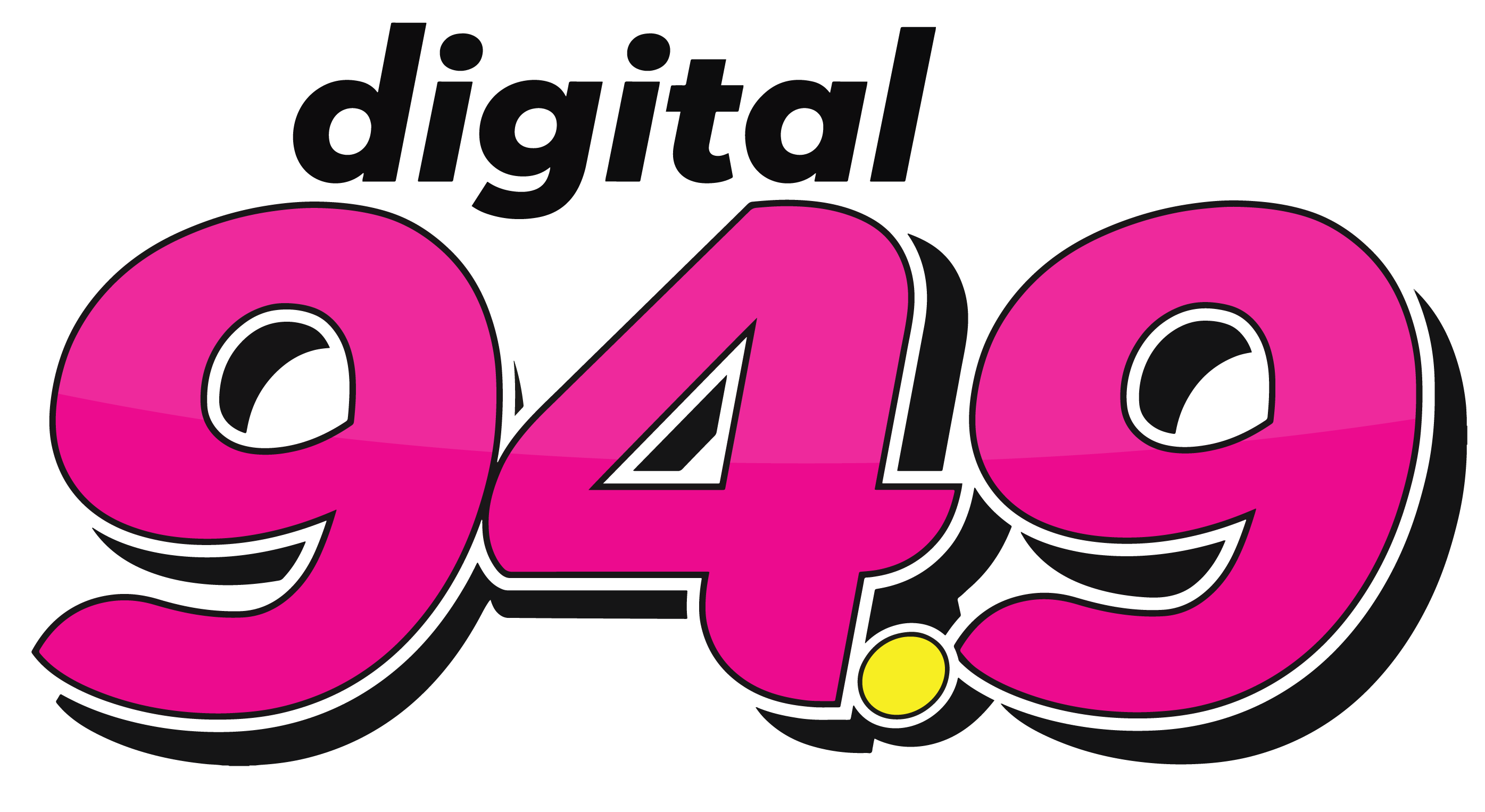
- Laredo, Texas; United States
- Broadcast area: Laredo, Texas; Nuevo Laredo, Tamaulipas
- Frequency: 94.9 MHz
- Branding: Digital 94.9 FM

Programming
- Language: Spanish
- Format: Contemporary hit radio–Latin pop–reggaeton–tropical music

Ownership
- Owner: Radio United; (Leading Media Group Corp.)
- Sister stations: XHBK-FM; KBDR; KNEX;

History
- First air date: 1972
- Former call signs: KOYE (1972–1999)
- Former frequencies: 92.7 MHz

Technical information
- Licensing authority: FCC
- Facility ID: 6430
- Class: C
- ERP: 100,000 watts
- HAAT: 247 meters (810 ft)
- Transmitter coordinates: 27.5201716°N 99.5222926°W

Links
- Public license information: Public file; LMS
- Webcast: Listen live
- Website: www.digital949.com

KQUR (94.9 FM "Digital 94.9 FM") is a Spanish Top 40 format radio station serving the Laredo, Texas, United States and Nuevo Laredo, Tamaulipas, Mexico markets.

== History ==
KOYE signed on in 1972 on 92.7 MHz with 3,000 watts of effective radiated power. A year later, it moved to 94.9 and increased its power to 100,000 watts. In 1999, KOYE became KQUR and adopted a rock format known as "Cure 95".

In 2007, KQUR flipped its format from rhythmic oldies "Jammin' 94.9" to hot adult contemporary "94.9 The Works - Fully Loaded Music". Initially a success, BMP Radio realized that the Laredo Borderplex needed a more popular format, fitting for the area. So in 2009, the station flipped its format to mainstream rock while retaining the name. In February 2012, station ownership moved the format to XHGTS-FM 107.3 FM for a few days; at the time, a Mexican affiliate of Border Media Partners owned and operated XHGTS. As a result, the Digital Spanish Top 40 format that had been on XHGTS was instituted on KQUR. KQUR's programming was formerly simulcast over local low-power television station KNEX-LP channel 55.
