= XHBK-FM =

Radio station in Nuevo Laredo, Tamaulipas

XHBK-FM/XEBK-AM
- Nuevo Laredo, Tamaulipas; Mexico
- Broadcast area: Nuevo Laredo, Tamaulipas; Laredo, Texas
- Frequencies: 1340 kHz; 95.7 MHz
- Branding: Pure Country 95.7 FM

Programming
- Format: Country music

Ownership
- Owner: Radio United; (Televisión y Sistemas, S.A. de C.V.)
- Sister stations: KQUR; KBDR; KNEX;

History
- First air date: November 20, 1935
- Former frequencies: 1000 kHz (1935–1957)

Technical information
- Licensing authority: CRT
- Class: B1 (FM), C (AM)
- Power: 1,000 watts
- ERP: 10,000 watts
- HAAT: 36.6 meters (120 ft)
- Transmitter coordinates: 27.4952386°N 99.5001939°W

Links
- Website: purecountry957.com

XHBK-FM/XEBK-AM (95.7 FM and 1340 AM) is a radio station in Nuevo Laredo, Tamaulipas, Mexico, broadcasting to the Laredo Borderplex. It is owned by Gustavo Alonso Cortez Montiel and currently programmed by Radio United with a country music format known as Pure Country 95.7 FM.

== History ==
XEBK received its concession on March 10, 1936, though it had gone on the air November 20, 1935. It was owned by Gilberto Guajardo and Juan Manuel Cortés and broadcast on 1000 kHz. Francisco Javier Cortés Delgado became the concessionaire in 1957, and under his leadership, XEBK moved to 1340 and increased power to 500 watts day and 250 at night, later increased to 1,000 watts. In 1994, it became an FM combo, adding XHBK-FM 95.7. Gustavo Alonso Cortez Montiel took over the station in 2006.

On December 1, 2019, the Cortez family took over XHK-FM 90.9 and relocated the La Raza Regional Mexican format there. XHBK relaunched as "BK 95.7 FM" that same day. XHBK then flipped to Exa FM on December 11, 2020.

On January 1, 2023, Radio United, which operates KQUR, KBDR, and KNEX in Laredo, Texas, began operating the station with a country music format known as Pure Country 95.7. The concession was transferred from Gustavo Alonso Cortez Montiel to Televisión y Sistemas, S.A. de C.V., a company jointly owned by the Bichara family and subsidiaries of Multimedios Radio.
