= Bruni, Texas =

Census-designated place in Webb County, Texas, United States

- CDP
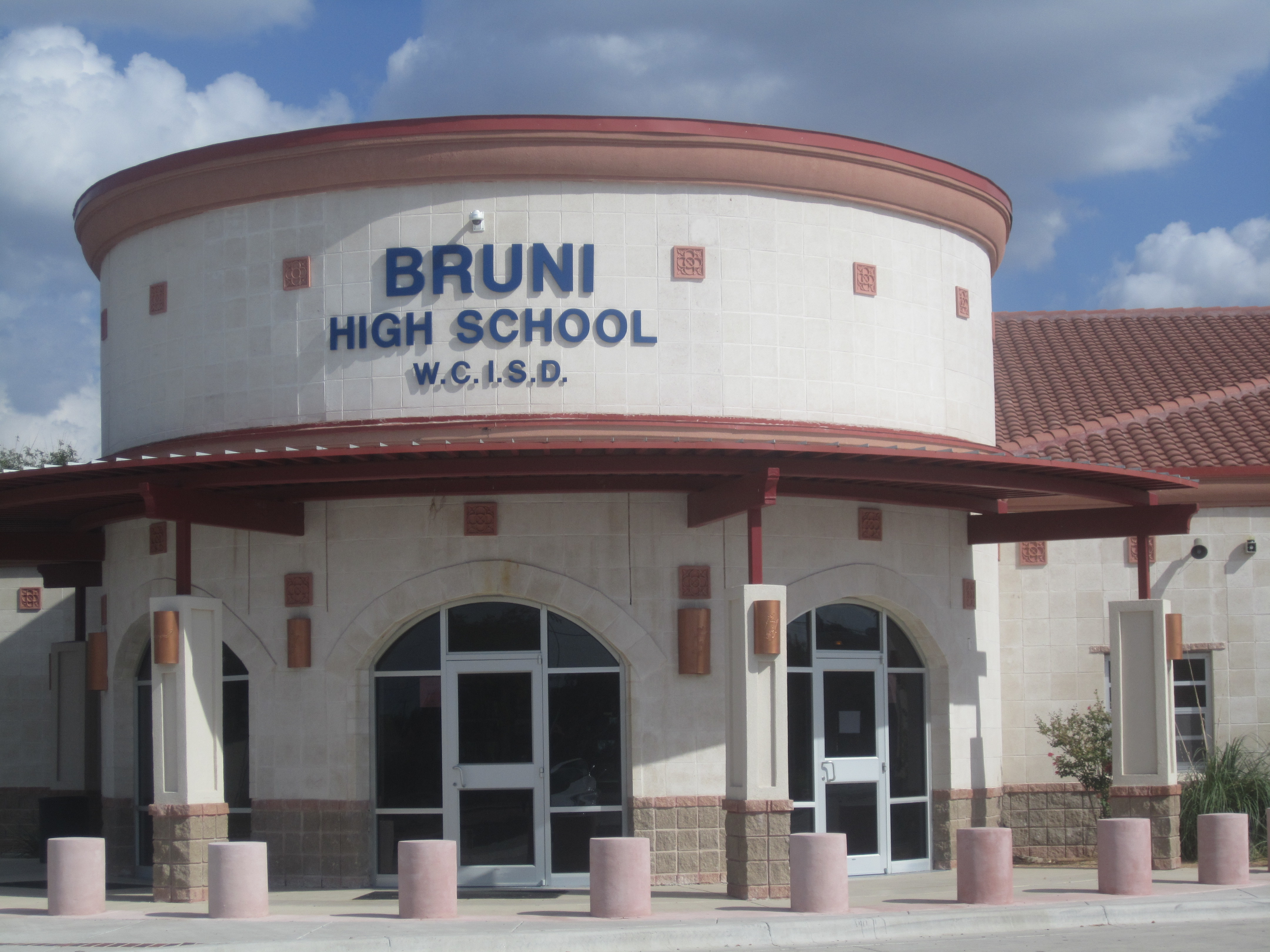
- Bruni High School in the Webb Consolidated Independent School District

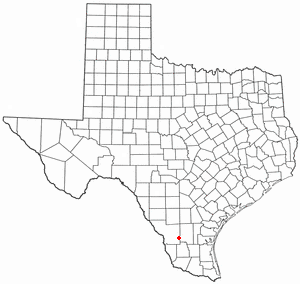
- Location of Bruni, Texas

- Coordinates: 27°25′42″N 98°50′17″W
- Country: United States
- State: Texas
- County: Webb
- Established: 1877

Area
  - Total: 1.3 sq mi (3.4 km^{2})
  - Land: 1.3 sq mi (3.4 km^{2})
  - Water: 0 sq mi (0.0 km^{2})
- Elevation: 771 ft (235 m)

Population (2020)
  - Total: 251
  - Density: 190/sq mi (74/km^{2})
- Time zone: UTC-6 (CST)
  - Summer (DST): UTC-5 (CST)
- Zip Code: 78371
- Area code: +1-361
- FIPS code: 48-10876
- GNIS feature ID: 2407911
- Nearest Airports: Laredo: Laredo International Airport KLRD LRD Nuevo Laredo: Quetzalcoatl International Airport MMNL NLD

Bruni is a census-designated place (CDP) in Webb County, Texas, United States. As of the 2020 census, Bruni had a population of 251.

It is one of several colonias in the county.

== History ==
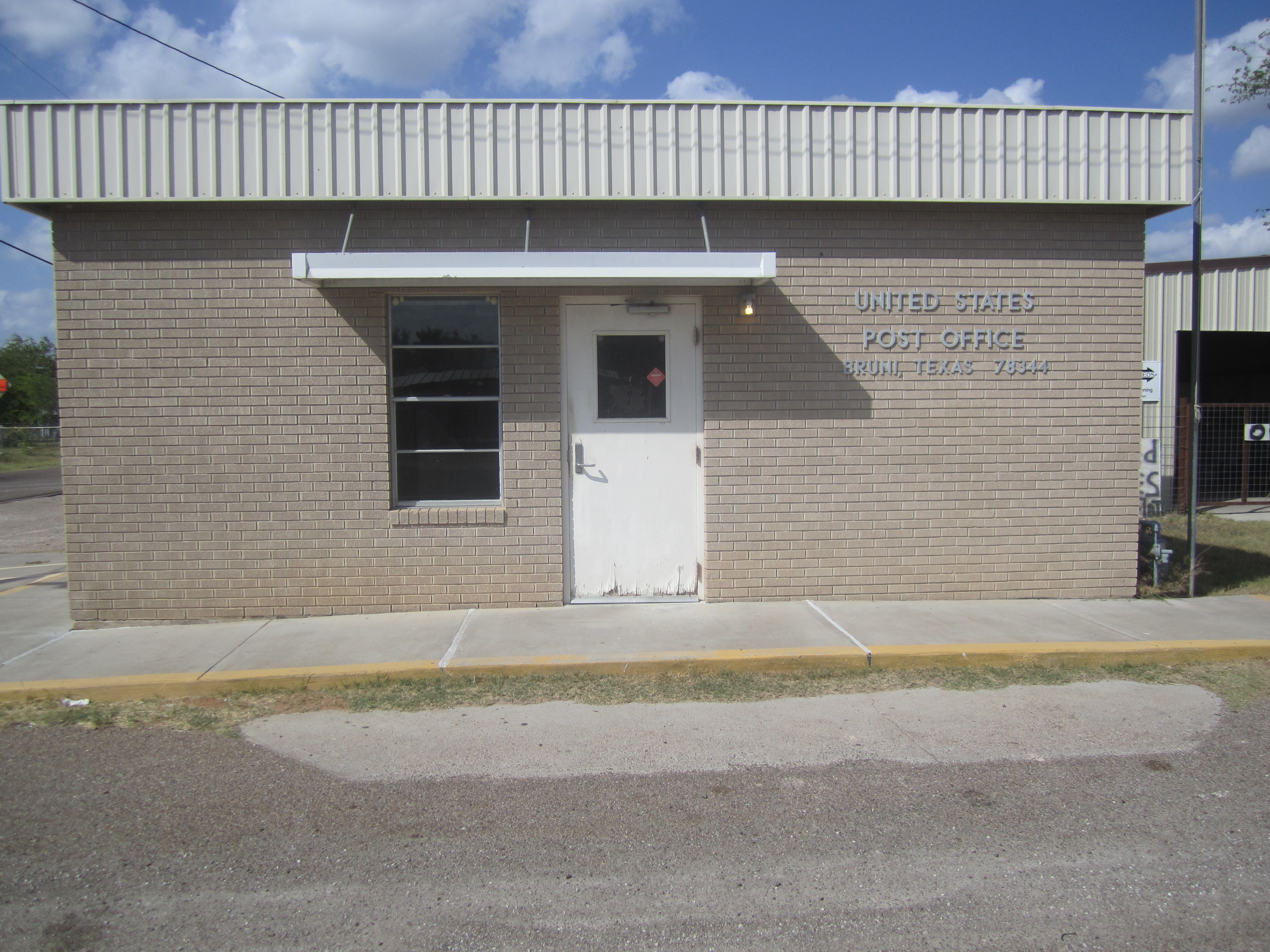
U.S. Post Office on Texas State Highway 359 in Bruni

Bruni was named after Antonio Mateo Bruni , a local Italian immigrant who owned a ranch and a general store. In 1937, Canadian aviators seeking to be the first to fly from Hudson Bay to Tierra Del Fuego crash-landed safely in Bruni. The population peaked at 800 in 1939 with the discovery of the South Bruni oilfield.

The town is within the boundary of Webb Consolidated Independent School District and it is home to the Bruni High School and Bruni Middle School.

== Geography ==
Bruni is located at 27°25′42″N 98°50′17″W (27.428328, -98.838098).

According to the United States Census Bureau, the CDP has a total area of 1.3 square miles (3.4 km^{2}), all land.

== Demographics ==
Historical population
Census	Pop.	Note	%±
2020	251		—
U.S. Decennial Census; 1850–1900 1910; 1920 1930 1940; 1950 1960 1970; 1980 1990 2000; 2010

Bruni first appeared as a census designated place in the 2000 U.S. census.

=== 2020 census ===
Bruni CDP, Texas – Racial and ethnic composition Note: the US Census treats Hispanic/Latino as an ethnic category. This table excludes Latinos from the racial categories and assigns them to a separate category. Hispanics/Latinos may be of any race.
Race / Ethnicity (NH = Non-Hispanic)	Pop 2000	Pop 2010	Pop 2020	% 2000	% 2010	% 2020
White alone (NH)	42	38	17	10.19%	10.03%	6.77%
Black or African American alone (NH)	0	0	1	0.00%	0.00%	0.40%
Native American or Alaska Native alone (NH)	3	0	0	0.73%	0.00%	0.00%
Asian alone (NH)	0	0	0	0.00%	0.00%	0.00%
Native Hawaiian or Pacific Islander alone (NH)	0	0	0	0.00%	0.00%	0.00%
Other race alone (NH)	0	0	0	0.00%	0.00%	0.00%
Mixed race or Multiracial (NH)	0	2	0	0.00%	0.53%	0.00%
Hispanic or Latino (any race)	367	339	233	89.08%	89.45%	92.83%
Total	412	379	251	100.00%	100.00%	100.00%

As of the 2020 United States census, there were 251 people, 129 households, and 98 families residing in the CDP.

=== 2010 census ===
As of the census of 2010, there were 379 people, 131 households, and 104 families residing in the CDP. The population density was 314.8 inhabitants per square mile (121.5/km^{2}). There were 176 housing units at an average density of 134.5 per square mile (51.9/km^{2}). The racial makeup of the CDP was 80.10% White, 0.73% Native American, 16.50% from other races, and 2.67% from two or more races. Hispanic or Latino of any race were 89.08% of the population.

There were 131 households, out of which 45.8% had children under the age of 18 living with them, 66.4% were married couples living together, 9.2% had a female householder with no husband present, and 20.6% were non-families. 19.1% of all households were made up of individuals, and 9.2% had someone living alone who was 65 years of age or older. The average household size was 3.15 and the average family size was 3.63.

In the CDP, the population was spread out, with 35.4% under the age of 18, 7.3% from 18 to 24, 25.5% from 25 to 44, 18.0% from 45 to 64, and 13.8% who were 65 years of age or older. The median age was 32 years. For every 100 females, there were 100.0 males. For every 100 females age 18 and over, there were 92.8 males.

The median income for a household in the CDP was $25,500, and the median income for a family was $29,688. Males had a median income of $25,875 versus $14,464 for females. The per capita income for the CDP was $11,355. About 15.3% of families and 18.9% of the population were below the poverty line, including 19.5% of those under age 18 and 13.3% of those age 65 or over.

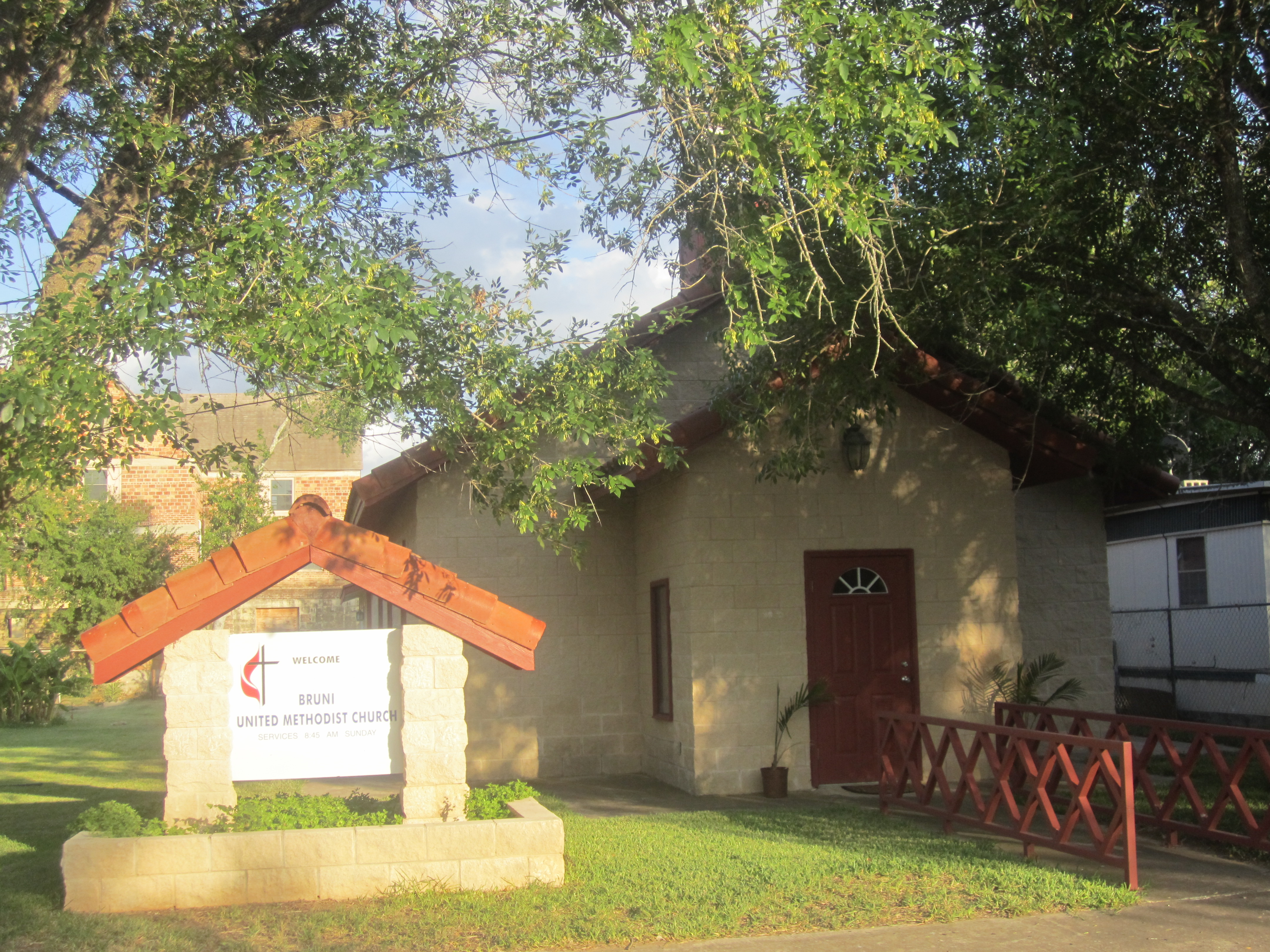
Bruni United Methodist Church

== Education ==
Bruni residents are in Webb Consolidated Independent School District and attend:

- Bruni High School (9-12)
- Bruni Middle School (6-8)
- Oilton Elementary School (K-5)

The designated community college for Webb County is Laredo Community College.

== See also ==
- List of census-designated places in Texas
