= Mirando City, Texas =

Census-designated place in Webb County, Texas, United States

- Census-designated place
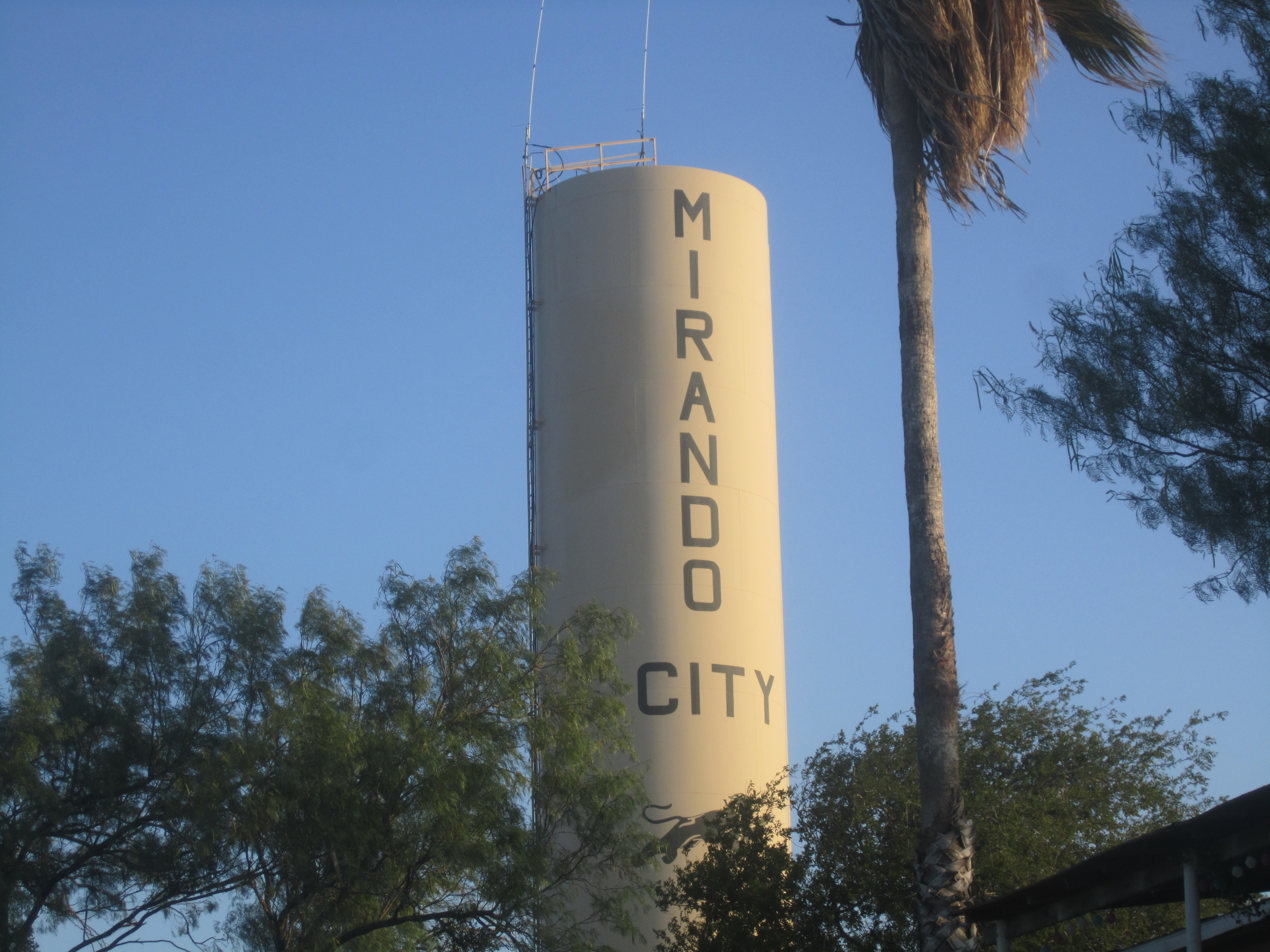
- Mirando City water tower, June 2011
- Interactive map of Mirando City, Texas
- Coordinates: 27°26′26″N 98°59′57″W
- Country: United States
- State: Texas
- County: Webb
- Established: 1881

Area
  - Total: 0.3 sq mi (0.78 km^{2})
  - Land: 0.3 sq mi (0.78 km^{2})
  - Water: 0.0 sq mi (0 km^{2})
- Elevation: 758 ft (231 m)

Population (2020)
  - Total: 222
  - Density: 740/sq mi (290/km^{2})
- Time zone: UTC-6 (CST)
  - Summer (DST): UTC-5 (CST)
- Zip Code: 78369
- Area code: +1 - 361
- FIPS code: 48-48756
- GNIS feature ID: 1341732
- Nearest Airports: Laredo: Laredo International Airport KLRD LRD Nuevo Laredo: Quetzalcoatl International Airport MMNL NLD

Mirando City is a census-designated place (CDP) in Webb County, Texas, United States. It is approximately 30 miles east of Laredo and 130 miles southwest of Corpus Christi. As of the 2020 census, Mirando City had a population of 222. The town gets its name from Nicolás Mirando, a Spanish land grantee. The population of Mirando City was highest in 1929, at an estimated 1500.

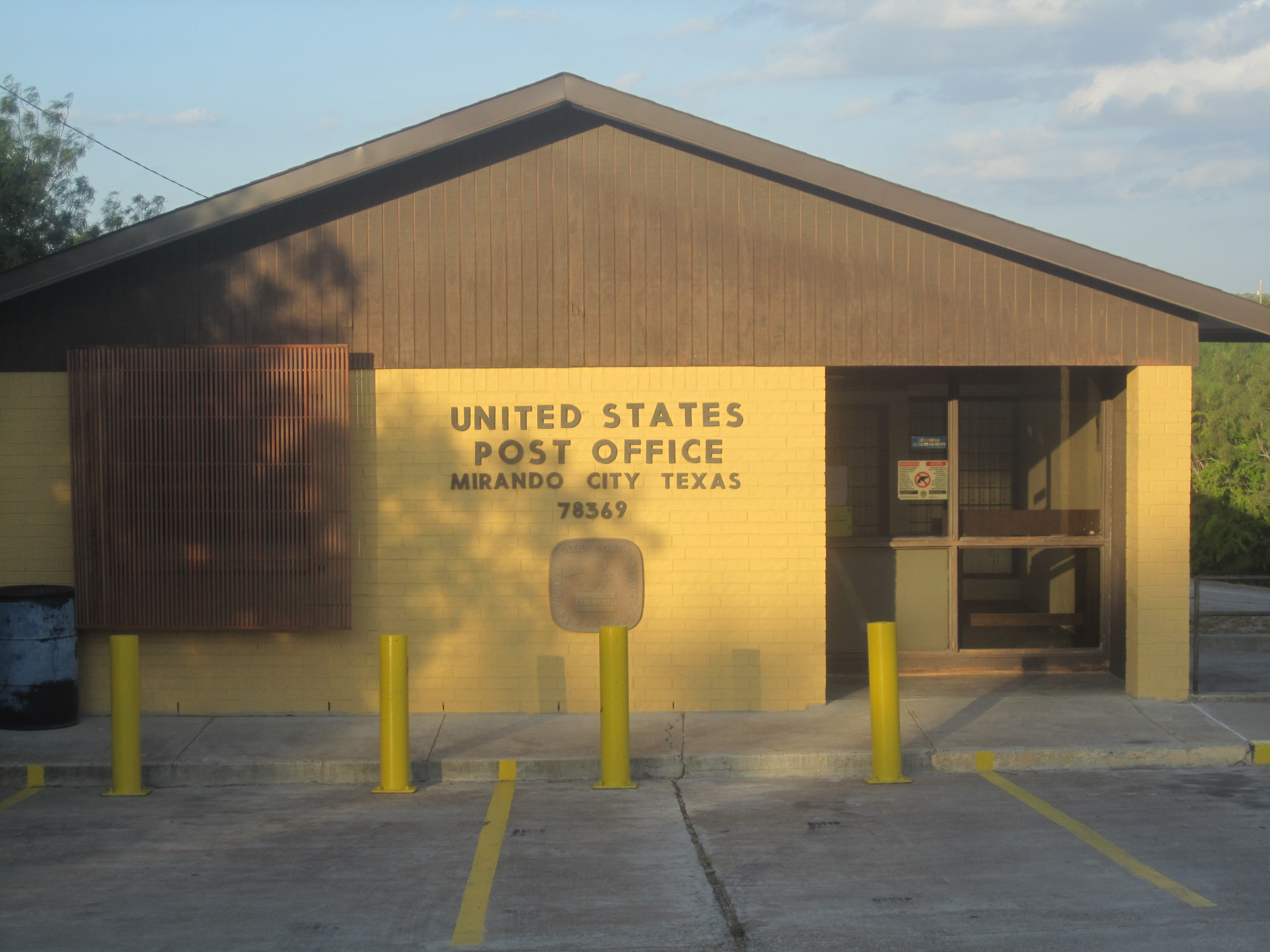
U.S. Post Office in Mirando City, June 2011

The peyote cactus thrives in and around Mirando City and nearby Oilton, and is a clandestine source of income for residents. Peyoteros have harvested peyote in Mirando City for over a hundred years.

Mirando City was the center of the South Texas Oil Boom, launched in 1921 by the industrialist Oliver Winfield Killam of Laredo.

== History ==
O. W. Killiam established the community in 1921. Charles A. Ingersoll, known as Bob, was an early wildcatter oilman in Webb County. Ingersoll brought in the first gusher....the kanoka #1 in the Schott pool.

== Geography ==
Mirando City is located at 27°26′26″N 98°59′57″W (27.440631, -98.999170).

According to the United States Census Bureau in 2000, the CDP has a total area of 11.1 square miles (28.7 km^{2}), all land. This CDP lost area in the changes in Webb County prior to the 2010 census. Its total area was reduced to 0.3 square miles (0.78 km^{2}), all land as before.

It is 30 miles (48 km) southeast of Laredo.

== Demographics ==
Historical population
Census	Pop.	Note	%±
2000	493		—
2010	375		−23.9%
2020	222		−40.8%
U.S. Decennial Census; 1850–1900 1910; 1920 1930 1940; 1950 1960 1970; 1980 1990 2000; 2010 2020

Mirando City first appeared as a census designated place in the 2000 U.S. census.

=== 2020 census ===
Mirando City CDP, Texas – Racial and ethnic composition Note: the US Census treats Hispanic/Latino as an ethnic category. This table excludes Latinos from the racial categories and assigns them to a separate category. Hispanics/Latinos may be of any race.
Race / Ethnicity (NH = Non-Hispanic)	Pop 2000	Pop 2010	Pop 2020	% 2000	% 2010	% 2020
White alone (NH)	36	15	6	7.30%	4.00%	2.70%
Black or African American alone (NH)	0	0	0	0.00%	0.00%	0.00%
Native American or Alaska Native alone (NH)	0	1	0	0.00%	0.27%	0.00%
Asian alone (NH)	4	0	2	0.81%	0.00%	0.90%
Native Hawaiian or Pacific Islander alone (NH)	0	0	0	0.00%	0.00%	0.00%
Other race alone (NH)	0	1	0	0.00%	0.27%	0.00%
Mixed race or Multiracial (NH)	0	1	1	0.00%	0.27%	0.45%
Hispanic or Latino (any race)	453	357	213	91.89%	85.20%	95.95%
Total	493	375	222	100.00%	100.00%	100.00%

As of the 2020 United States census, there were 222 people, 138 households, and 87 families residing in the CDP.

=== 2000 census ===
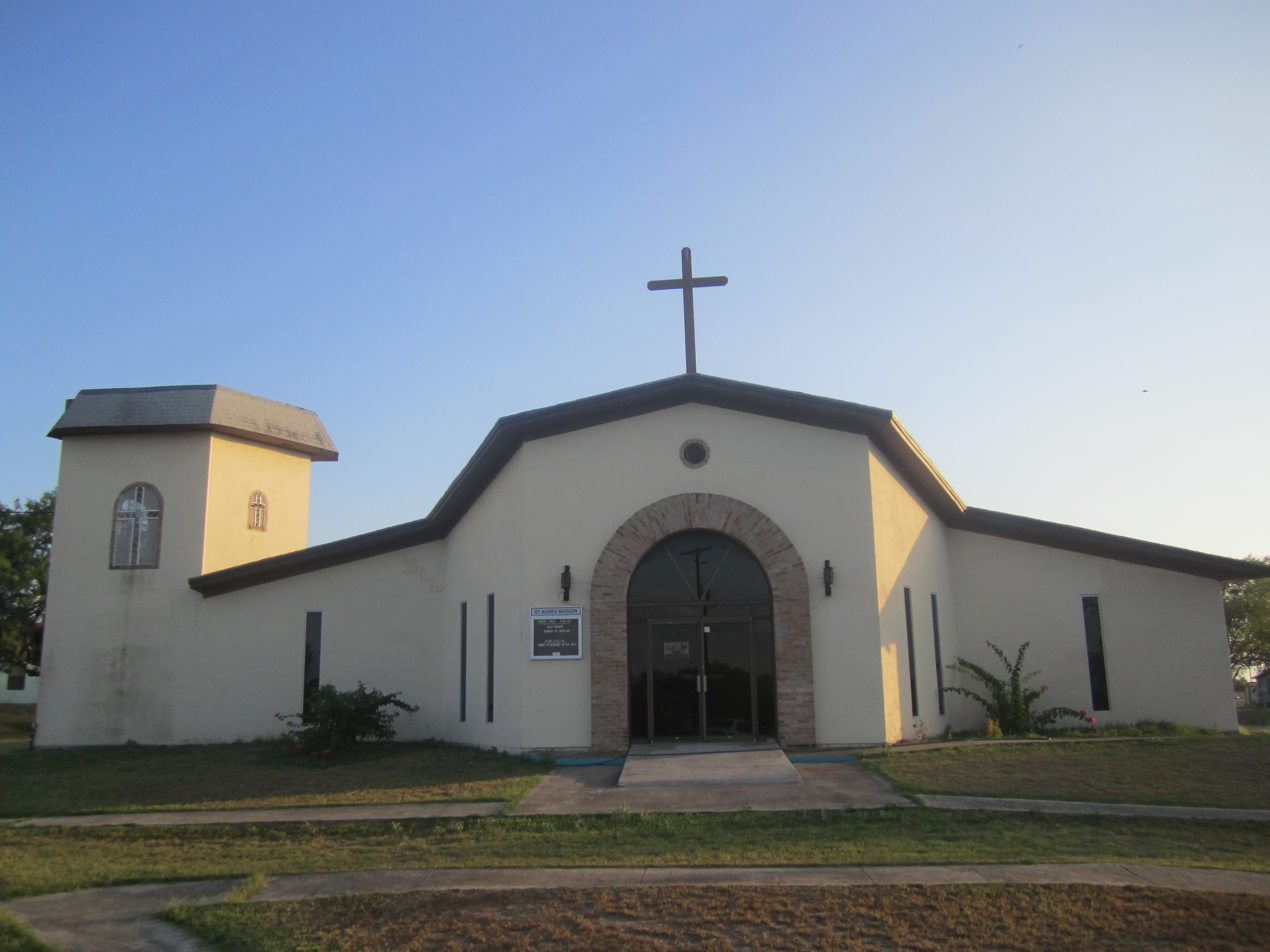
St. Agnes Roman Catholic Mission in Mirando City, June 2011

As of the census of 2000, there were 493 people, 145 households, and 108 families residing in the CDP. The population density was 44.5 inhabitants per square mile (17.2/km^{2}). There were 205 housing units at an average density of 18.5/sq mi (7.1/km^{2}). The racial makeup of the CDP was 85.80% White, 0.20% Native American, 0.81% Asian, 10.95% from other races, and 2.23% from two or more races. Hispanic or Latino people of any race were 91.89% of the population.

There were 145 households, out of which 48.3% had children under the age of 18 living with them, 63.4% were married couples living together, 8.3% had a female householder with no husband present, and 25.5% were non-families. 22.8% of all households were made up of individuals, and 8.3% had someone living alone who was 65 years of age or older. The average household size was 3.40 and the average family size was 4.16.

In the CDP, the population was spread out, with 39.6% under the age of 18, 7.1% from 18 to 24, 23.1% from 25 to 44, 19.7% from 45 to 64, and 10.5% who were 65 years of age or older. The median age was 28 years. For every 100 females, there were 90.3 males. For every 100 females age 18 and over, there were 94.8 males.

The median income for a household in the CDP was $24,375, and the median income for a family was $30,221. Males had a median income of $25,250 versus $18,250 for females. The per capita income for the CDP was $9,553. About 22.2% of families and 26.0% of the population were below the poverty line, including 27.3% of those under age 18 and 35.6% of those age 65 or over.

== Education ==
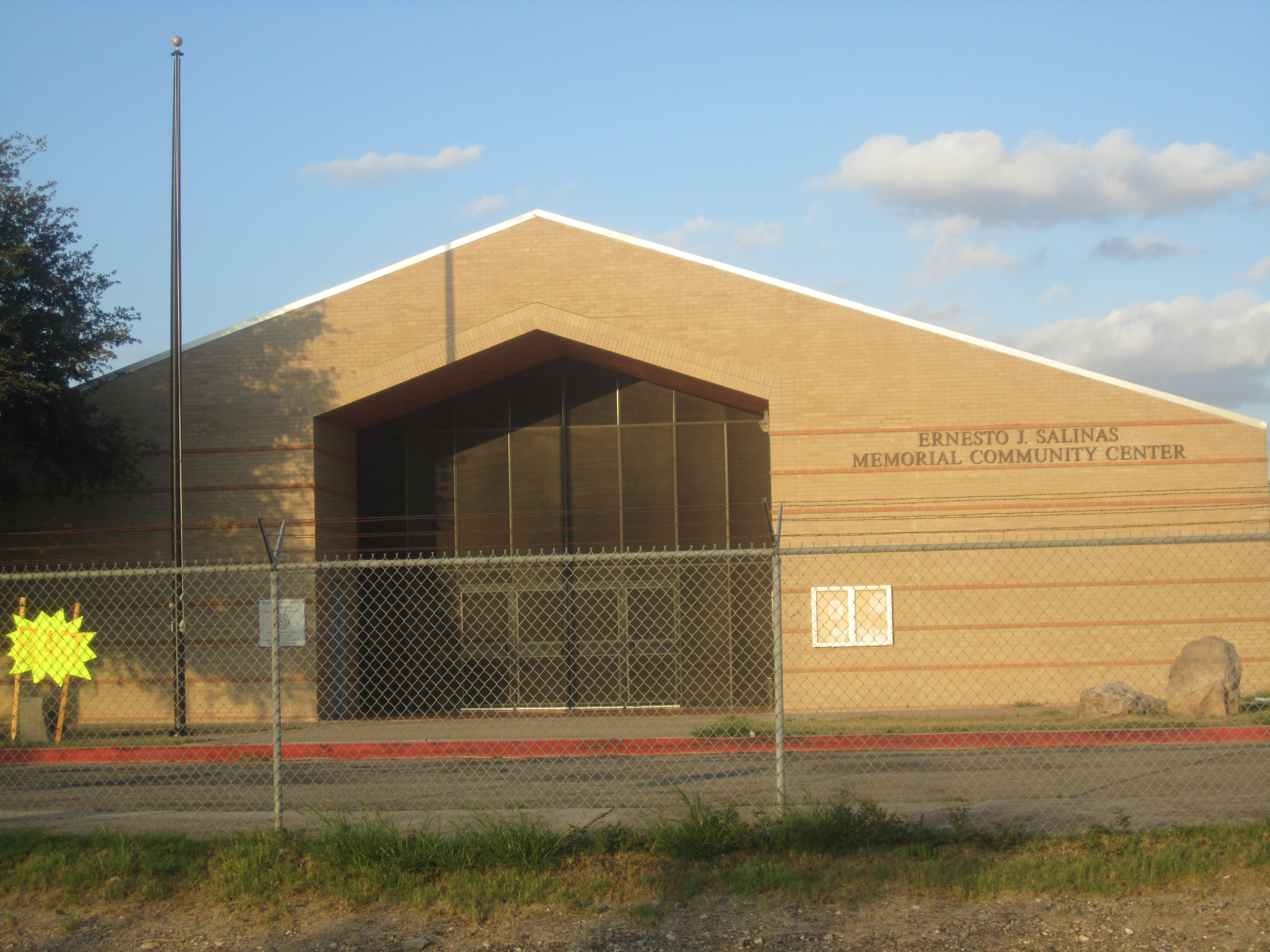
Ernesto J. Salinas Memorial Community Center, June 2011

Mirando City is served by the Webb Consolidated Independent School District (Webb CISD).

Mirando City residents attend:

- Bruni High School (9-12)
- Bruni Middle School (6-8)
- Oilton Elementary School (K-5)

Prior to 1994, Webb CISD served only Bruni and Oilton. Mirando City Independent School District served the community of Mirando City from 1923 to 2005. Prior to 1994, all Mirando City children attended Mirando City ISD schools. After the spring semester of 1994, Mirando High School closed. Therefore, from the fall of 1994 to July 1, 2005, WCISD served high schoolers from Mirando City, while Mirando Elementary School in the Mirando City ISD served students from kindergarten through 8th grade. On May 9, 2005 the Texas Education Agency ordered the closure of Mirando City ISD. The district closed on July 1, 2005, and all students were rezoned to Webb CISD schools. All of Mirando City's children now go to Webb CISD schools.

The designated community college for Webb County is Laredo Community College.

== Parks and recreation ==
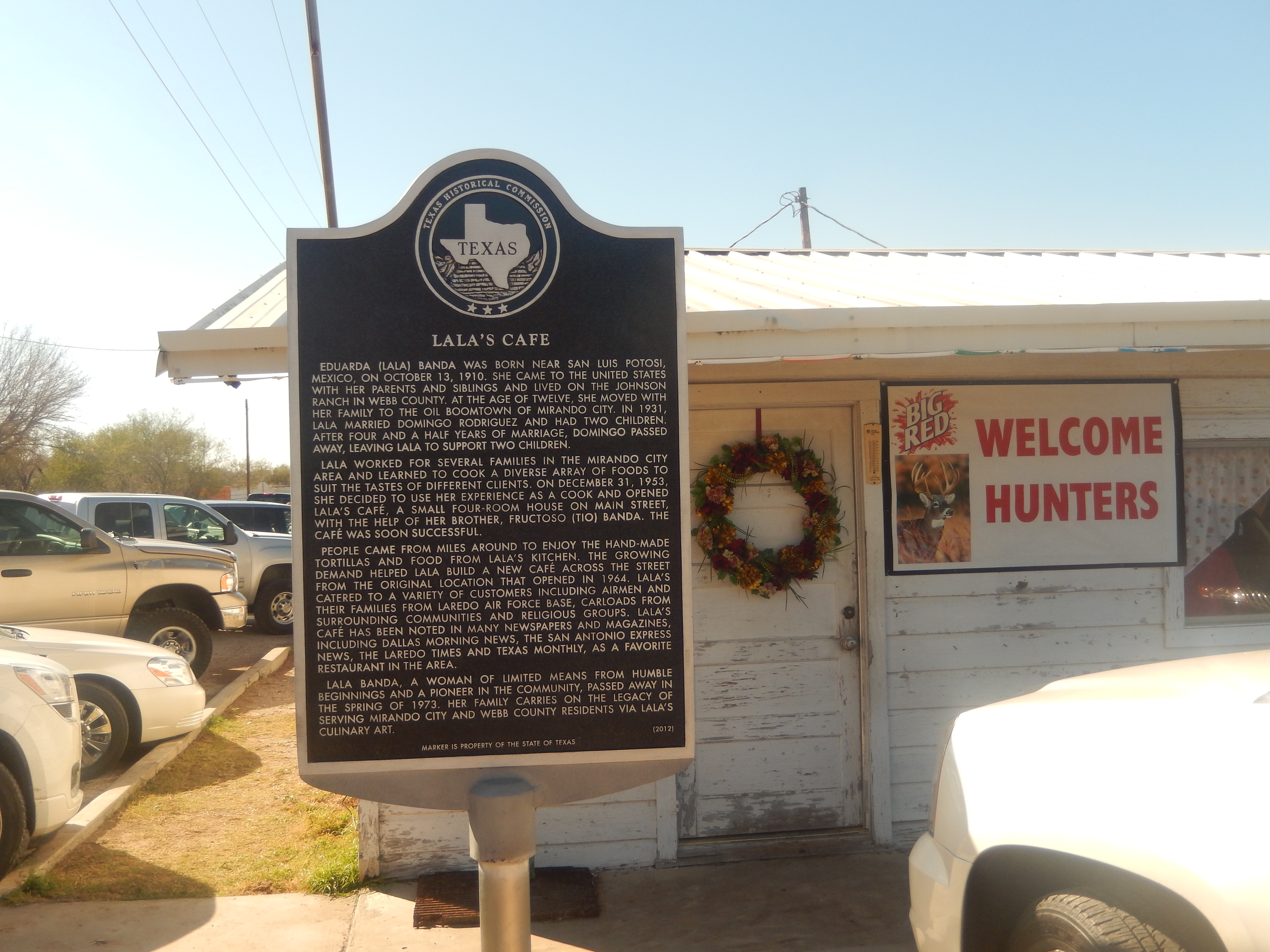
Historical marker at Lala's Café in Mirando City, February 2014

Webb County operates the Ernesto J. Salinas Memorial Community Center.

== Lala's Cafe ==
City's main business is Lala's Cafe, a Texas-Mexican restaurant on Main Street which opened in 1953 and moved to its current location in 1964 across the street from the original site. It received a historical marker from the Webb County Historical Association on January 4, 2014.

Founded by Eduarda "Lala" Rodriguez, who died in 1973, the café is now operated by her granddaughter, Noemi "Mimi" Jackson.

== See also ==
- List of census-designated places in Texas
