= Aguilares, Texas =

Census-designated place in Webb County, Texas, United States

- Unincorporated community Census designated place
- Location within Texas Location within the United States
- Coordinates: 27°26′55″N 99°05′14″W
- Country: United States
- State: Texas
- County: Webb
- Established: 1870

Area
  - Total: 0.3 sq mi (0.78 km^{2})
  - Land: 0.3 sq mi (0.78 km^{2})
  - Water: 0.0 sq mi (0 km^{2})
- Elevation: 584 ft (178 m)

Population (2020)
  - Total: 6
  - Density: 20/sq mi (7.7/km^{2})
- Time zone: UTC-6 (Central (CST))
  - Summer (DST): UTC-5 (CDT)
- Zip Code: 78369
- Area code: +1-361
- FIPS code: 48-01420
- GNIS feature ID: 2584599
- Nearest Airports: Laredo: Laredo International Airport KLRD LRD Nuevo Laredo: Quetzalcoatl International Airport MMNL NLD

Aguilares is a census-designated place (CDP) in Webb County, Texas, United States. This was a new CDP for the 2010 census, with a population of 21. As of the 2020 census, Aguilares had a population of 6.

It is one of several colonias in the county.

== Geography ==
Aguilares is located at 27°27′6″N 99°5′36″W (27.451627, -99.093233). The CDP has a total area of 0.3 square miles (0.78 km^{2}), all land.

== History ==
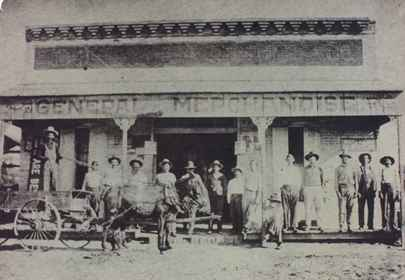
Aguilares Mercantile Store 1911

Aguilares dates to 1870. It is named for the first settlers and ranchers, José, Locario, Francisco, Próspero, and Librado Aguilar. It became a stop on the Texas-Mexican Railroad in 1881 and was granted a post office nine years later. The population (thought to be a huge exaggeration) was given as 1,500 in 1910 – but four years later it was reportedly a mere 300. The Aguilar family owned a store – one of the two businesses in the community.

Oil was discovered nearby in Oilton and for a short time the town seemed to have a future – but although (or because) it was on a railroad – it lost population to the nearby county seat of Laredo. In the 1930s, the post office was discontinued and in 1939 Aquilares' population was ten. The population rose to twenty-five by 1945, but the 1990 census again reported ten residents.

== Demographics ==
Historical population
Census	Pop.	Note	%±
2010	21		—
2020	6		−71.4%
U.S. Decennial Census; 1850–1900 1910; 1920 1930 1940; 1950 1960 1970; 1980 1990 2000; 2010 2020

Aguilares first appeared as a census designated place in the 2010 U.S. census.

=== 2020 census ===
Aguilares CDP, Texas – Racial and ethnic composition Note: the US Census treats Hispanic/Latino as an ethnic category. This table excludes Latinos from the racial categories and assigns them to a separate category. Hispanics/Latinos may be of any race.
Race / Ethnicity (NH = Non-Hispanic)	Pop 2010	Pop 2020	% 2010	% 2020
White alone (NH)	1	1	4.76%	16.67%
Black or African American alone (NH)	1	0	4.76%	0.00%
Native American or Alaska Native alone (NH)	0	0	0.00%	0.00%
Asian alone (NH)	0	0	0.00%	0.00%
Native Hawaiian or Pacific Islander alone (NH)	0	0	0.00%	0.00%
Other race alone (NH)	0	0	0.00%	0.00%
Mixed race or Multiracial (NH)	1	0	4.76%	0.00%
Hispanic or Latino (any race)	18	5	85.71%	83.33%
Total	21	6	100.00%	100.00%

== Education ==
The CDP is within the Webb Consolidated Independent School District. The district operates Bruni High School.

The designated community college for Webb County is Laredo Community College.

== Notable person ==
- Pedro Gonzalez-Gonzalez, television and film character actor, was born in Aguilares.

== See also ==
- List of census-designated places in Texas
