= KVTV =

Television station in Laredo, Texas (1973–2015)

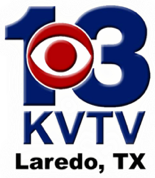
- Laredo, Texas; United States
- Channels: Digital: 13 (VHF); Virtual: 13
- Branding: KVTV CBS 13

Programming
- Affiliations: CBS (1973–2015)

Ownership
- Owner: Eagle Creek Broadcasting of Texas; (Eagle Creek Broadcasting of Laredo, LLC)

History
- First air date: December 28, 1973
- Last air date: July 1, 2015
- Former channel numbers: Analog: 13 (VHF, 1973-2009); Digital: 14 (UHF, 2001–2006), 31 (UHF, 2006–2009)
- Call sign meaning: disambiguation of former sister station KZTV

Technical information
- Licensing authority: FCC
- Facility ID: 33078
- ERP: 3 kW
- HAAT: 284 m (932 ft)
- Transmitter coordinates: 27°31′12″N 99°31′19″W

Links
- Public license information: Public file; LMS

KVTV (channel 13) was a television station in Laredo, Texas, United States, affiliated with CBS. The station was owned by Eagle Creek Broadcasting.

On July 1, 2015, Gray Television, owner of NBC affiliate KGNS-TV, bought the non-license assets of KVTV and established KYLX-LP, to which it moved all of KVTV's program streams. KVTV then ceased broadcasting after nearly 42 years. The KVTV full-power license was surrendered on September 19, 2016.

== History ==
One of several stations serving the Laredo–Nuevo Laredo borderplex, KVTV signed on December 28, 1973, as a satellite station of KZTV, the CBS affiliate in Corpus Christi, Texas, owned by K-Six Television. Both stations were run on tight budgets, which meant that the lack of investment in the station's operations sometimes showed up on-air. In 2002, Alta Communications and Brian Brady acquired K-Six Television, renaming the company Eagle Creek Broadcasting of Texas.

KVTV operated newscasts during the 1980s and early 2000s under the name Newswatch 13. At the peak of their news operation, KVTV produced three daily 30-minute newscasts at noon, 6 p.m., and 10 p.m. After making significant strides in the Nielsen ratings against then-powerhouse KGNS-TV's Pro 8 News in the mid 1990s, KVTV management decided in 1996 to move the 6 p.m. newscast to 6:30 to make way for the new entertainment show Access Hollywood. Many KVTV alumni working at that time believed that decision proved to be the start of the demise of Newswatch 13.

Soon after the new owners took over they made significant changes to KVTV. All newscasts the station produced were dropped, except for the noon show, which was said to help reduce the strain put upon the news and production departments. Later that year, the station made cosmetic and personnel changes on almost every level and renamed their operations CBS 13 News. The midday newscast was retained for a year and a half and later dropped. Late night news was revived on the station on April 19, 2004, with CBS 13 News: Nightcast, a similar title to its Corpus Christi sister. For this, former KGNS anchorman Richard Noriega was hired out of semi-retirement to lead the newscast. Several months prior to the newscast, Noriega worked as a consultant and helped with the planning involved in revamping the station's news department.

Nightcast was the station's only local newscast, and was seen weekdays from 10 to 10:35 p.m. Prior to this program, a taped five-minute news bulletin called NewsNight aired.

The station decided to cancel the late newscast on January 3, 2006, and laid off the remaining staff of the news department that day. The move left KVTV as one of the few CBS affiliates to not have a local newscast; in its last decade on the air, the only news programming on the station came from CBS News, including the CBS Evening News, CBS Morning News, and CBS This Morning with national weather and additional news updates given by a CBS News anchor during the :25 and :55 local news breaks. From 2006 until the end of broadcasting in 2015, the station largely served as a pass-through for automated network, syndicated and local paid programming in both English and Spanish.

On July 23, 2008, Eagle Creek Broadcasting sold KVTV's Corpus Christi sister station, KZTV, to SagamoreHill Broadcasting. KVTV was not included in that deal, as SagamoreHill already owned KGNS-TV; thus, KVTV became the only television station remaining in the Eagle Creek group, though co-owner Brian Brady also owned a number of other television stations, mostly through Northwest Broadcasting.

Due to a part failure on its analog transmitter, KVTV ceased broadcasting in analog on November 29, 2008. The station initially broadcast only on digital channel 31, mapped to virtual channel 13. Digital broadcasts shifted to channel 13 on May 7, 2009.

Gray Television, which over a year prior had purchased KGNS-TV from SagamoreHill, bought the non-license assets of KVTV in 2015. The sale closed on July 1, at which time KVTV signed off and KYLX-LP began broadcasting (inheriting its CBS affiliation from KVTV) with KVTV going off the air on that day.

The KVTV license was surrendered by Eagle Creek on September 19, 2016.

== Subchannels ==
The station's signal was multiplexed:

Subchannels of KVTV
Subchannel	Res.	Short name	Programming
13.1	1080i	KVTV-DT	CBS (4:3 on DT2)
13.2	480i	KVTVDT2	CBS (4:3 on DT2)
