= KLDO-TV =

Television station in Laredo, Texas

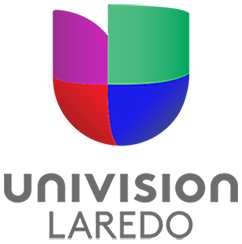
- Laredo, Texas; United States
- City: Laredo, Texas
- Channels: Digital: 19 (UHF); Virtual: 27
- Branding: Univision Laredo

Programming
- Affiliations: 27.1: Univision; for others, see § Subchannels

Ownership
- Owner: Entravision Communications; (Entravision Holdings, LLC)
- Sister stations: KXOF-CD; KETF-CD

History
- First air date: December 17, 1984
- Former call signs: KJTB (1984, CP)
- Former channel numbers: Analog: 27 (UHF, 1984–2009)
- Former affiliations: ABC (1984–1988, per program 1988–1993); Telemundo (1988–1996)
- Call sign meaning: "Laredo"

Technical information
- Licensing authority: FCC
- Facility ID: 51479
- ERP: 150 kW
- HAAT: 135 m (443 ft)
- Transmitter coordinates: 27°39′54.9″N 99°36′31.4″W

Links
- Public license information: Public file; LMS
- Website: noticiaslaredo.com

KLDO-TV (channel 27) is a television station in Laredo, Texas, United States, affiliated with the Spanish-language network Univision. It is owned by Entravision Communications alongside two low-power, Class A stations: UniMás affiliate KETF-CD (channel 39) and Fox affiliate KXOF-CD (channel 31). The three stations share studios on Monarch Drive in Laredo; KLDO-TV's transmitter is located in Ranchos Penitas West, Texas.

== History ==
=== ABC affiliate ===
In the early 1980s, five applications were received to start a new TV station for Laredo, the city's third, on UHF channel 27. In December 1982, the Federal Communications Commission designated four of them for hearing, from K-RIO Broadcasting Company; Carlos Ortiz; Tierra del Sol Broadcasting Company, owner of KVEO-TV in Brownsville; and Panorama Broadcasting Company. Ortiz, a pastor proposing to operate channel 27 as a Christian station, later dropped his proposal because of the multiple competing applications from secular groups; Oro Broadcasting Company was disqualified because its principal owner was not a United States citizen.

As a result of a downturn in the regional economy, Tierra del Sol withdrew; Panorama then reimbursed K-RIO for its expenses in a settlement that paved the way for it to be granted the permit in April 1983. A tower was erected in the parking lot of Laredo's Riverdrive Mall, where studios were set up. Having been known as KJTB during construction, KLDO-TV signed on December 17, 1984, as an ABC affiliate; the affiliation had belonged to KGNS-TV. Laredo thus became among the last markets with three-network service. In addition to ABC programming, KLDO-TV produced local news under the title Laredo Eyewitness News. In January 1987, KLDO became a secondary affiliate of Fox.

=== Spanish-language programming ===
KLDO's logo prior to January 1, 2013

The station switched to Telemundo in October 1988, retaining select ABC programs including sports, Good Morning America, and Nightline. The move coincided with Panorama signing a management agreement with Francisco Javier Sánchez Campuzano, the president of Mexico City-based Grupo Siete, which at the time owned several radio stations in Nuevo Laredo. The switch to primarily Spanish-language programming led to an upturn in ratings, moving from dead last to first place in the February 1989 Nielsen survey.

In 1996, KLDO changed affiliations from Telemundo to Univision; by this time, in total-day audience ratings, it was the market's number-one station. Entravision acquired KLDO-TV in 1997, and the station moved out of the Riverdrive Mall and into a new facility on Loop 20 in 2000. KLDO-TV continued to be the most-watched station in the market, but KGNS-TV brought in twice as much revenue.

Until February 28, 2018, the station produced Spanish-language newscasts, branded as Noticias Univision 27; the KLDO news operation was discontinued in favor of a regional newscast produced out of McAllen sister station KNVO.

== Technical information ==
=== Subchannels ===
The station's signal is multiplexed:

Subchannels of KLDO-TV
Subchannel	Res.	Short name	Programming
27.1	1080i	Univisn	Univision
27.2	480i	LATV	LATV
27.5	480i	CourtTV	Court TV
27.6	480i	Majstad	Majestad TV
27.88	720p	AltaVsn	AltaVision

Subchannel broadcast with MPEG-4 video
