= KYLX-CD =

Television station in Laredo, Texas

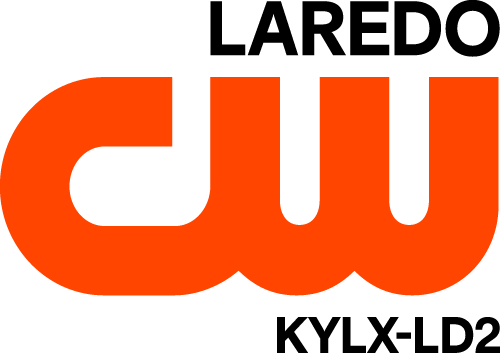
- Laredo, Texas; United States
- City: Laredo, Texas
- Channels: Digital: 13 (VHF); Virtual: 13
- Branding: KYLX 13 Laredo; CW Laredo (13.2)

Programming
- Affiliations: 13.1: CBS; 13.2: CW+; for others, see § Subchannels

Ownership
- Owner: Gray Media; (Gray Television Licensee, LLC)
- Sister stations: KGNS-TV, KXNU-CD

History
- Founded: October 16, 1997
- First air date: July 1, 1999
- Former call signs: K55HW (1999–2002); KNEX-LP (2002–2015); KYLX-LP (July–September 2015); KYLX-LD (2015–2025)
- Former channel numbers: Analog: 55 (UHF, 1999–2011); Digital: 14 (UHF, 2012–2015)
- Former affiliations: Más Música/MTV Tr3s; Azteca América; KQUR audio
- Call sign meaning: Laredo, Texas

Technical information
- Licensing authority: FCC
- Facility ID: 40244
- Class: CD
- ERP: 3 kW
- HAAT: 277.6 m (911 ft)
- Transmitter coordinates: 27°40′22″N 99°39′52″W
- Translator(s): KXNU-CD 10.2 Laredo

Links
- Public license information: Public file; LMS

KYLX-CD (channel 13) is a low-power, Class A television station in Laredo, Texas, United States, affiliated with CBS and The CW Plus. It is owned by Gray Media alongside dual NBC/ABC affiliate KGNS-TV (channel 8) and Class A Telemundo affiliate KXNU-CD (channel 10). The three stations share studios on Loop 20 (near SH 359) in Laredo and transmitter facilities on FM 1472 northwest of the city.

== History ==
KYLX-LD first went on the air on July 1, 1999, as K55HW on channel 55, and was owned by Border Media Partners. It changed its call letters to KNEX-LP in 2002, matching co-owned radio station KNEX (106.1 FM). Under Border Media Partners, the station was affiliated with Mas Musica and later MTV Tr3s before it switched programming to Azteca América. The station later disaffiliated from Azteca América and the station started broadcasting audio from KQUR-FM on a rotating-color screen with its call sign and channel number. In 2009, Border Media Partners LLC transferred the station to Border Media Business Trust pursuant to a forbearance agreement between Border Media Partners and its lenders.

The station was off the air for almost a year, as all broadcasting on channels above 51 was ended by the Federal Communications Commission (FCC) on December 31, 2011; KNEX applied to operate in digital on channel 42 but later applied to operate on 14; in December 2012, the FCC approved this request. Since late December 2012, KNEX had been testing its signal on channel 14.3.

In March 2012, Eagle Creek Broadcasting, owner of KVTV (channel 13), agreed to purchase KNEX-LP from Border Media Business Trust. Under Eagle Creek, KNEX's digital test broadcasts would include simulcasts of KVTV's programming. On May 18, 2015, Eagle Creek Broadcasting reached a deal to sell KNEX-LP to Gray Television, owner of KGNS-TV (channel 8), for $25,000; upon taking control on July 1, 2015, Gray changed the station's call letters to KYLX-LP. On the same day, Gray also acquired the non-license assets of KVTV from Eagle Creek and moved its programming, including the CBS affiliation, to KYLX, at which point KVTV ceased operations.

As part of the application, the KVTV technical facilities were retained. The construction permit for channel 14 was abandoned; instead, KNEX filed for a digital companion channel on channel 13 at 3 kW ERP — the same technical parameters as KVTV, but on a low-power license, which Gray could legally own. Eagle Creek also filed for special temporary authority to use those facilities immediately. The STA was granted on June 16, 2015. The KYLX-LD facility was fully licensed on September 29, 2015.

In October 2015, KYLX launched The CW on its second digital subchannel, bringing Laredo an over-the-air CW affiliate for the first time since KGNS-DT2 switched to ABC in July 2014.

== Subchannels ==
The station's signal is multiplexed:

Subchannels of KYLX-CD
Channel	Res.	Short name	Programming
13.1	1080i	KYLX-LD	CBS
13.2	720p	CW	The CW Plus
13.3	480i	Bounce	Bounce TV (4:3)
13.4	480i	Crime	True Crime Network (4:3)
