= KXOF-CD =

Television station in Laredo, Texas

- Laredo, Texas; Nuevo Laredo, Tamaulipas; United States–Mexico
- City: Laredo, Texas
- Channels: Digital: 31 (UHF); Virtual: 31
- Branding: Fox Laredo, Fox News Laredo

Programming
- Affiliations: 31.1: Fox; for others, see § Subchannels

Ownership
- Owner: Entravision Communications; (Entravision Holdings, LLC)
- Sister stations: KLDO-TV, KETF-CD

History
- Founded: February 18, 1997
- First air date: July 28, 1997
- Former call signs: K15EZ (1997–June 1999); K25GN (June–October 1999); KZLD-LP (October 1999–2005); KETF-CA (2005–2011); KETF-CD (2011–2018)
- Former channel numbers: Analog: 15 (UHF, 1997–1999), 25 (UHF, 1999–2009)
- Former affiliations: Enlace (1997–1999); Pax (1999–2005); Telefutura/UniMás (2005–2018); MyNetworkTV (secondary, 2018–2021)
- Call sign meaning: "XOF" is "Fox" spelled backwards

Technical information
- Licensing authority: FCC
- Facility ID: 32177
- Class: CD
- ERP: 15 kW
- HAAT: 162.3 m (532 ft)
- Transmitter coordinates: 27°31′13″N 99°31′20″W

Links
- Public license information: Public file; LMS
- Website: foxrgv.tv

KXOF-CD (channel 31) is a low-power, Class A television station in Laredo, Texas, United States, affiliated with the Fox network. It is owned by Entravision Communications alongside Univision affiliate KLDO-TV (channel 27) and Class A UniMás affiliate KETF-CD (channel 39). The three stations share studios on Monarch Drive in Laredo; KXOF-CD's transmitter is located on Shea Street north of downtown.

KXOF-CD and Harlingen-based KFXV (channel 60), which serves the Rio Grande Valley to the southeast, use the same newscast called Fox News South Texas which is divided into two segments; Laredo news (originating from KXOF) and Rio Grande Valley news (originating from KFXV).

== History ==
The station began on July 28, 1997, as K15EZ, an affiliate of Enlace, a Spanish-language religious network. It moved from channel 15 to channel 25 on June 29, 1999, as K25GN, and became an affiliate of Pax on August 6, 1999. From October 4, 1999, to March 7, 2005, the station carried the call sign KZLD-LP. Entravision bought the station on March 8, 2005, simultaneously switching the station to a Spanish-language Telefutura network as KETF-CA. In 2009, KETF-CA went off the air due to XHBR transmitting digitally on channel 25.1. In June of that year, KETF-CA applied for a permit to start transmitting digitally on channel 31.1. In January 2010, the permit was granted. The station changed its call sign to KETF-CD on January 3, 2011.

KETF-CD and its sister station KXOF-CD swapped call signs on December 13, 2018.

== Subchannels ==
The station's signal is multiplexed:

Subchannels of KXOF-CD
Channel	Res.	Short name	Programming
31.1	720p	FOX	Fox
31.2	480i	Grit	Grit
31.3	480i	Laff	Laff
