= KNEX (FM) =

Radio station in Laredo, Texas

Coordinates: 27.5201716°N 99.5222926°W

- Laredo, Texas; United States
- Broadcast area: Laredo, Texas; Nuevo Laredo, Tamaulipas
- Frequency: 106.1 MHz
- Branding: Hot 106.1 FM

Programming
- Format: Contemporary hit radio
- Affiliations: Compass Media Networks; Premiere Networks; Westwood One

Ownership
- Owner: Radio United; (Leading Media Group Corp.)
- Sister stations: XHBK-FM; KQUR; KBDR;

History
- First air date: 1991
- Former call signs: KZTQ (1991-97)
- Call sign meaning: NEXT (from previous name "K-NEXT 106.1")

Technical information
- Licensing authority: FCC
- Facility ID: 42148
- Class: A
- ERP: 6,000 watts
- HAAT: 54 meters (177 ft)

Links
- Public license information: Public file; LMS
- Webcast: Listen Live
- Website: hot1061.com

KNEX (106.1 MHz branded as "Hot 106.1 FM") is a Contemporary hit radio FM radio station that serves the Laredo, Texas, United States and Nuevo Laredo, Tamaulipas, Mexico border area. The station is owned by Grupo Multimedios, through licensee Leading Media Group Corp.
