= Oilton, Texas =

Census-designated place in Webb County, Texas, United States

- Census-designated place
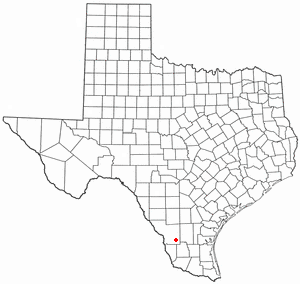
- Location of Oilton, Texas

- Coordinates: 27°28′8″N 98°58′33″W
- Country: United States
- State: Texas
- County: Webb
- Established: 1922

Area
  - Total: 1.4 sq mi (3.6 km^{2})
  - Land: 1.4 sq mi (3.6 km^{2})
  - Water: 0.0 sq mi (0 km^{2})
- Elevation: 860 ft (260 m)

Population (2020)
  - Total: 270
  - Density: 190/sq mi (74/km^{2})
- Time zone: UTC-6 (CST)
  - Summer (DST): UTC-5 (CST)
- Zip Code: 78371
- Area code: +1-361
- FIPS code: 48-53556
- GNIS feature ID: 1343096
- Nearest Airports: Laredo: Laredo International Airport KLRD LRD Nuevo Laredo: Quetzalcoatl International Airport MMNL NLD

Oilton is a census-designated place (CDP) in Webb County, Texas, United States. As of the 2020 census, Oilton had a population of 270. The community is within the boundary of Webb Consolidated Independent School District and is home to the Oilton Elementary School.

== History ==
Oilton is located 32 miles east of Laredo, Texas. It was originally called Torrecillas Towers, for two limestone formations nearby. In 1922 the name was changed because that year, oil was discovered near the town, which also caused it to grow.

== Geography ==
Oilton is located at 27°28′8″N 98°58′33″W (27.468979, -98.975739).

According to the United States Census Bureau in 2000, the CDP has a total area of 0.8 square miles (2.2 km^{2}), all land. This CDP gained area in the changes in Webb County prior to the 2010 census. Its total area was increased to 1.4 square miles (3.6 km^{2}), all land as before.

== Demographics ==
Historical population
Census	Pop.	Note	%±
2000	310		—
2010	353		13.9%
2020	270		−23.5%
U.S. Decennial Census; 1850–1900 1910; 1920 1930 1940; 1950 1960 1970; 1980 1990 2000; 2010

Oilton first appeared as a census designated place in the 2000 U.S. census.

=== 2020 census ===
Oilton CDP, Texas – Racial and ethnic composition Note: the US Census treats Hispanic/Latino as an ethnic category. This table excludes Latinos from the racial categories and assigns them to a separate category. Hispanics/Latinos may be of any race.
Race / Ethnicity (NH = Non-Hispanic)	Pop 2000	Pop 2010	Pop 2020	% 2000	% 2010	% 2020
White alone (NH)	19	8	8	6.13%	2.27%	2.96%
Black or African American alone (NH)	0	0	1	0.00%	0.00%	0.37%
Native American or Alaska Native alone (NH)	0	0	0	0.00%	0.00%	0.00%
Asian alone (NH)	0	1	1	0.00%	0.28%	0.37%
Native Hawaiian or Pacific Islander alone (NH)	0	0	0	0.00%	0.00%	0.00%
Other race alone (NH)	0	0	0	0.00%	0.00%	0.00%
Mixed race or Multiracial (NH)	1	0	0	0.32%	0.00%	0.00%
Hispanic or Latino (any race)	290	344	260	93.55%	97.45%	96.30%
Total	310	353	270	100.00%	100.00%	100.00%

As of the 2020 United States census, there were 270 people, 75 households, and 44 families residing in the CDP.

=== 2000 census ===
As of the census of 2000, there were 310 people, 89 households, and 71 families residing in the CDP. The population density was 371.1 inhabitants per square mile (143.3/km^{2}). There were 124 housing units at an average density of 148.4 per square mile (57.3/km^{2}). The racial makeup of the CDP was 72.58% White, 1.61% African American, 20.65% from other races, and 5.16% from two or more races. Hispanic or Latino people of any race were 93.55% of the population.

There were 89 households, out of which 50.6% had children under the age of 18 living with them, 56.2% were married couples living together, 20.2% had a female householder with no husband present, and 20.2% were non-families. 19.1% of all households were made up of individuals, and 13.5% had someone living alone who was 65 years of age or older. The average household size was 3.48 and the average family size was 4.06.

In the CDP, the population was spread out, with 39.7% under the age of 18, 8.1% from 18 to 24, 23.9% from 25 to 44, 17.1% from 45 to 64, and 11.3% who were 65 years of age or older. The median age was 28 years. For every 100 females, there were 81.3 males. For every 100 females age 18 and over, there were 78.1 males.

The median income for a household in the CDP was $20,625, and the median income for a family was $21,964. Males had a median income of $24,375 versus $18,750 for females. The per capita income for the CDP was $7,890. About 29.2% of families and 32.1% of the population were below the poverty line, including 37.2% of those under age 18 and 16.1% of those age 65 or over.

== Education ==
Oilton is served by the Webb Consolidated Independent School District.

Oilton residents attend:

- Bruni High School (9-12)
- Bruni Middle School (6-8)
- Oilton Elementary School (K-5)

The designated community college for Webb County is Laredo Community College.

== See also ==
- List of census-designated places in Texas
