= KETF-CD =

Television station in Laredo, Texas

- Laredo, Texas; Nuevo Laredo, Tamaulipas; United States–Mexico
- City: Laredo, Texas
- Channels: Digital: 27 (UHF); Virtual: 39
- Branding: UniMás Laredo

Programming
- Affiliations: 39.1: UniMás; for others, see § Subchannels

Ownership
- Owner: Entravision Communications; (Entravision Holdings, LLC)
- Sister stations: KLDO-TV, KXOF-CD

History
- Founded: July 10, 1995
- First air date: August 6, 1999
- Former call signs: K39EL (1995–1999); KNEZ-LP (1999–2007); KXOF-CA (2007–2013); KXOF-CD (2013–2018)
- Former affiliations: Enlace (1999–2007); Fox (2007–2018); MyNetworkTV (secondary, 2012–2018); MundoFox/MundoMax (CD2, 2012–2016); Azteca América (CD4, 2017–2022)
- Call sign meaning: Entravision Telefutura (former name of UniMás, affiliation for sister station KXOF-CD)

Technical information
- Licensing authority: FCC
- Facility ID: 11699
- Class: CD
- ERP: 3.2 kW
- HAAT: 131.8 m (432 ft)
- Transmitter coordinates: 27°31′13″N 99°31′20″W

Links
- Public license information: Public file; LMS

KETF-CD (channel 39) is a low-power, Class A television station in Laredo, Texas, United States, affiliated with the Spanish-language network UniMás. It is owned by Entravision Communications alongside Univision affiliate KLDO-TV (channel 27) and Class A Fox affiliate KXOF-CD (channel 31). The three stations share studios on Monarch Drive in Laredo; KETF-CD's transmitter is located on Shea Street north of downtown.

== History ==
From 1999 to 2007 (under the ownership of the executors of Carlos Ortiz's estate, who were also the co-founders of La Familia Network and Fe-TV), it broadcast programming from TBN Enlace USA 24 hours a day, as KNEZ-LP. In March 2007, the station was acquired by Entravision Communications Corporation, owners of KLDO-TV and KETF-CD, with the intent to affiliate the station with the Fox network. In July 2007, Entravision changed the station's callsign to KXOF-CA and began to air Fox programming. With this change, San Antonio Fox affiliate KABB (which was carried on Time Warner Cable's Laredo system) was removed from the provider's lineup due to FCC rules.

On August 1, 2012, KXOF-CA turned off its analog signal and started broadcasting Fox in high definition on virtual channel 39.1 and MundoFox in standard definition on 39.2. MundoFox, which rebranded to MundoMax in 2015, folded on November 30, 2016. In February 2017, KXOF-CD began to carry Azteca América on 39.2. Prior to this affiliation, Azteca América was carried solely through the network's national feed on Time Warner Cable.

KETF-CD and sister station KXOF-CD swapped call letters on December 13, 2018, resulting in the Fox/MyNetworkTV affiliate retaining the KXOF-CD call letters and KETF-CD now being a dual UniMás/Azteca-affiliated station.

== Subchannels ==
The station's signal is multiplexed:

Subchannels of KETF-CD
Channel	Res.	Short name	Programming
39.1	1080i	Unimas	UniMás
39.2	480i	Comet	Comet
39.3	480i	Charge	Charge!
39.4	720p	Azteca	[Blank]
