= South Texas =

Region of the U.S. state of Texas

- Region
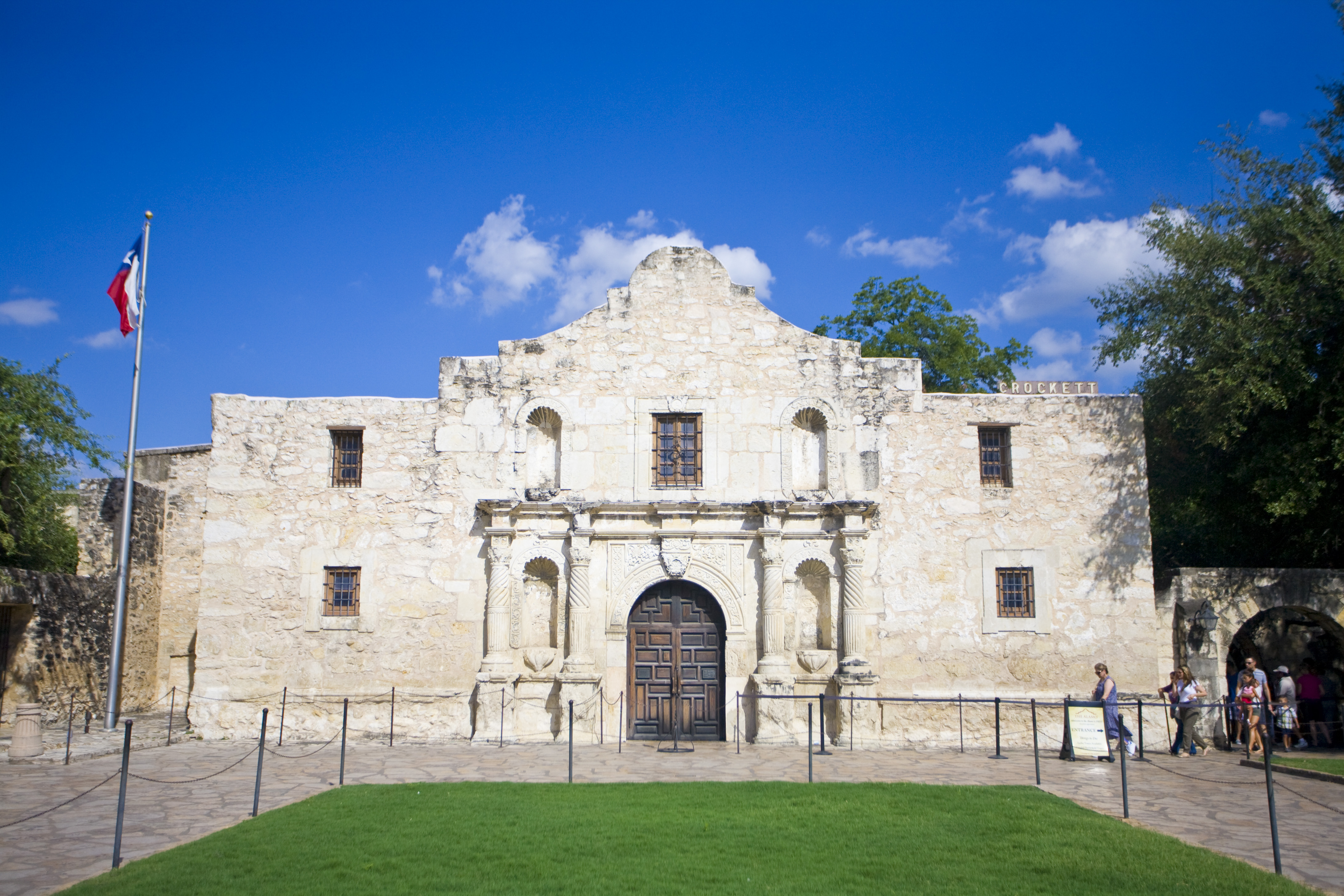
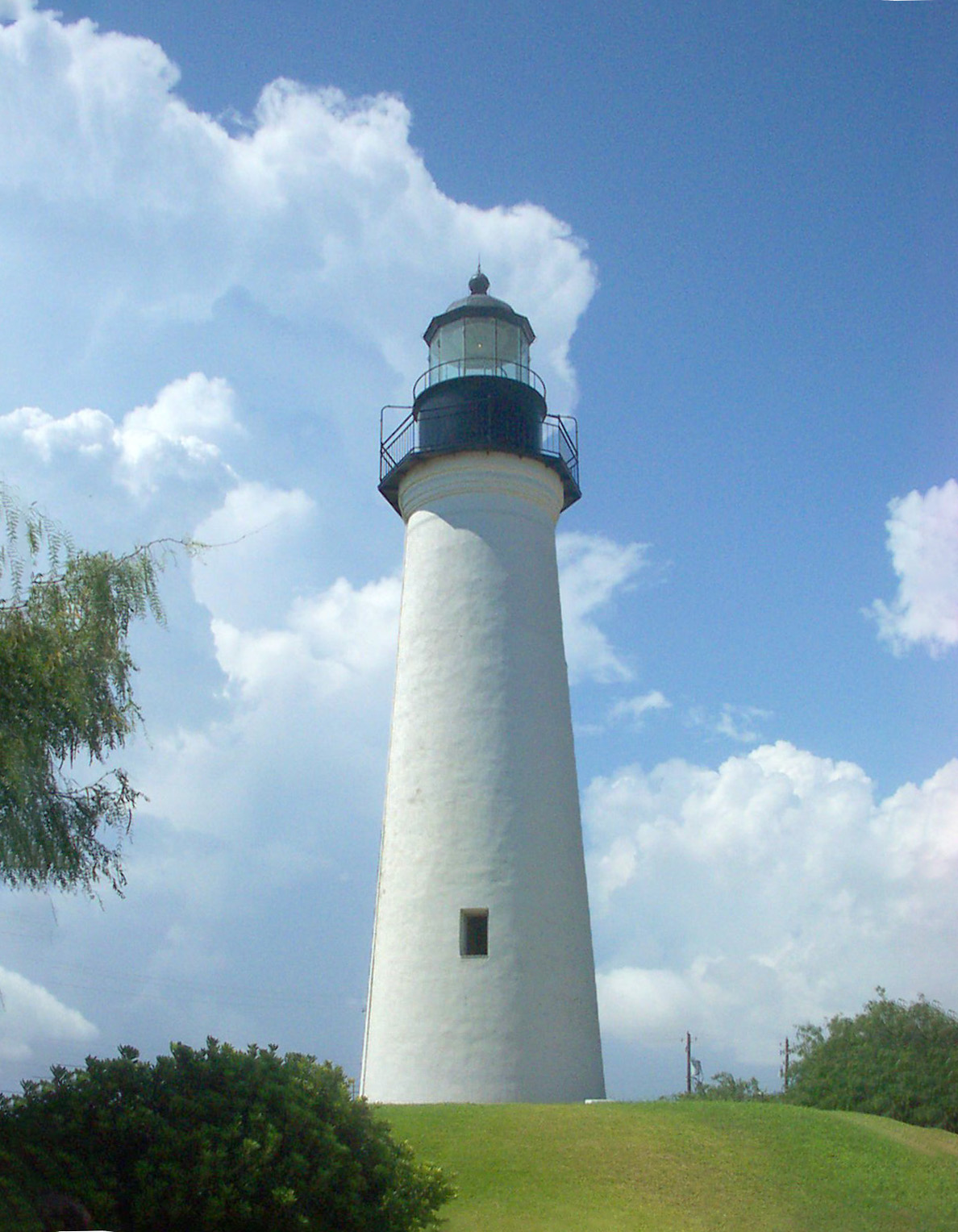
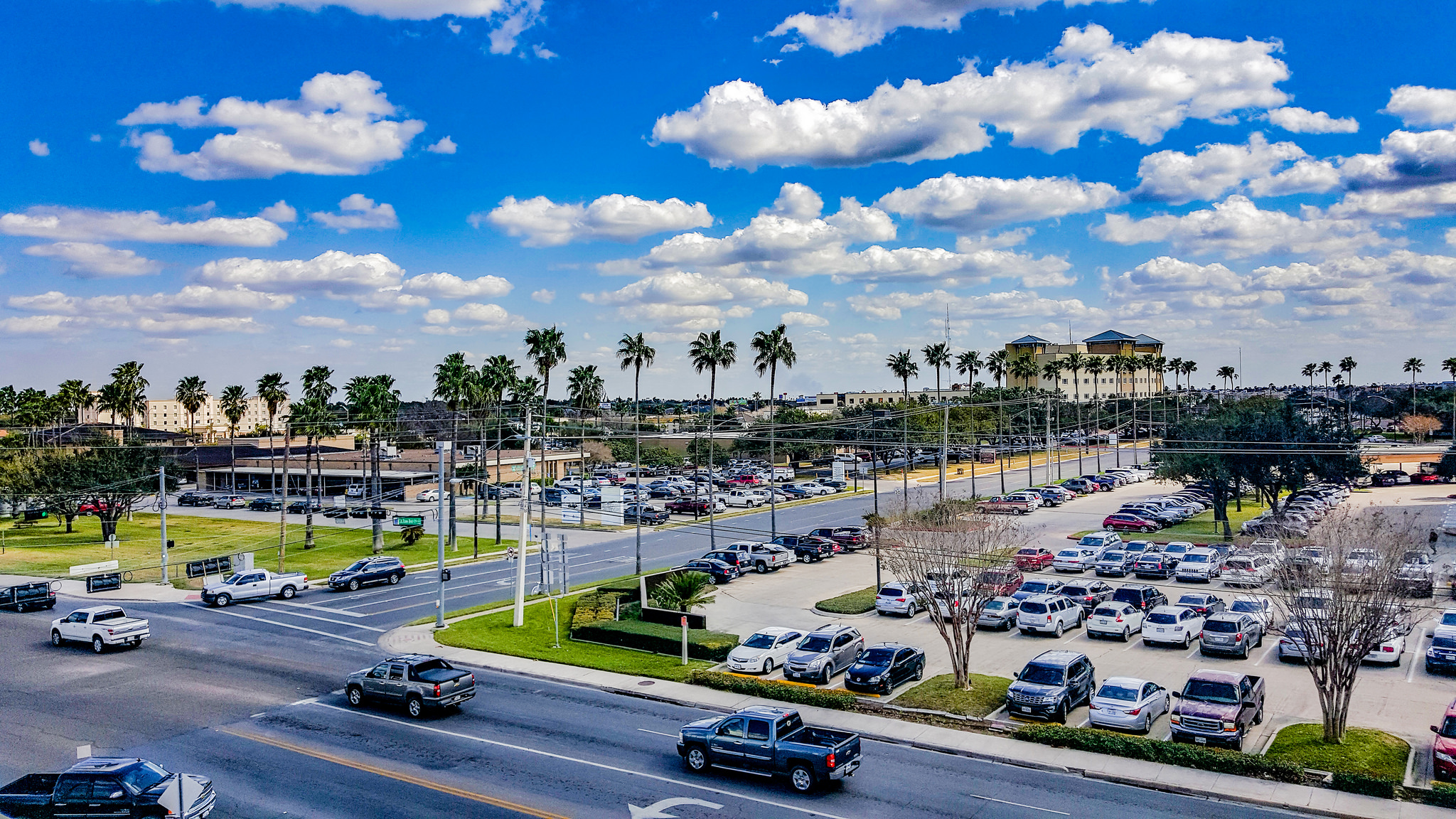
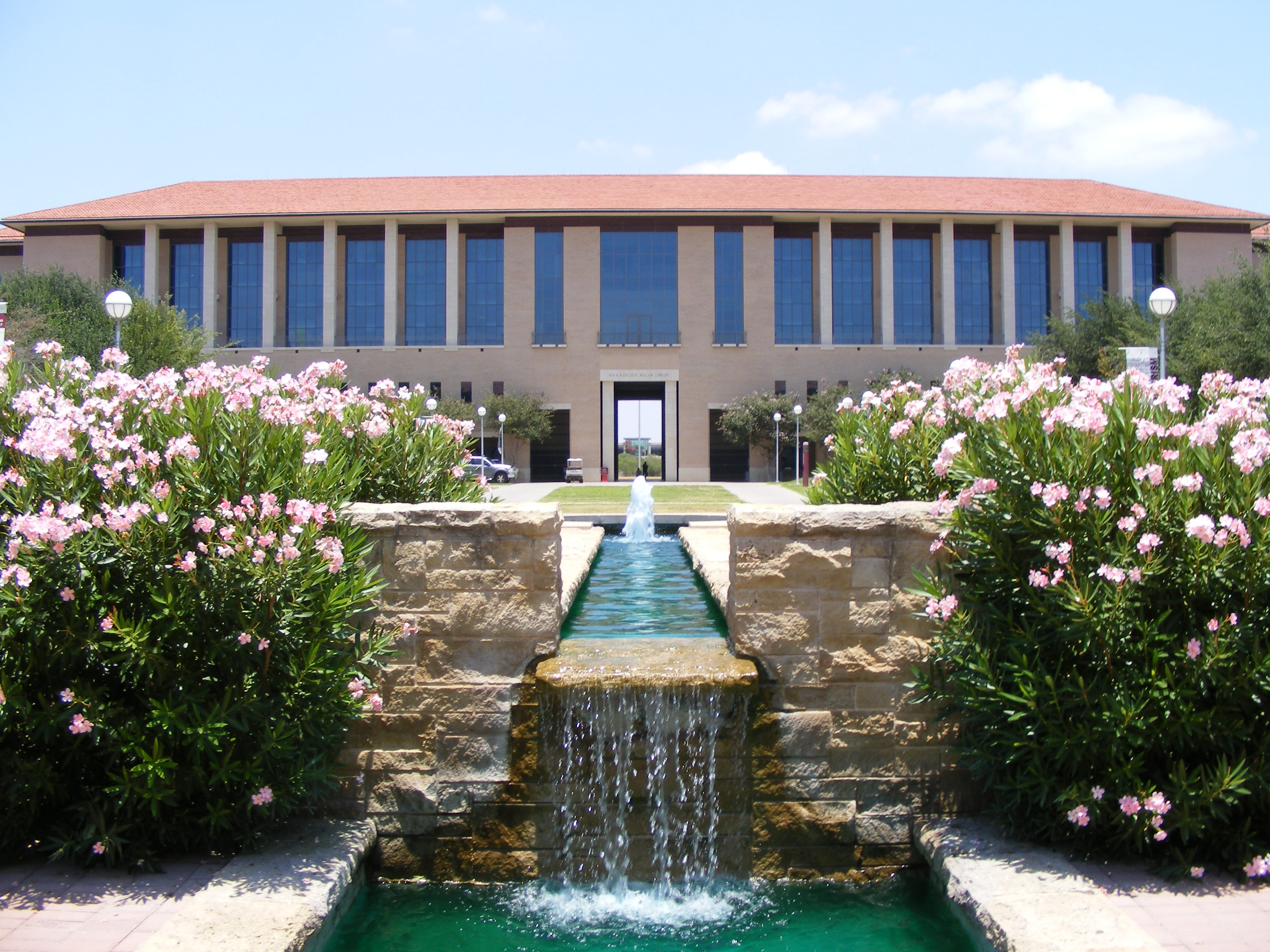
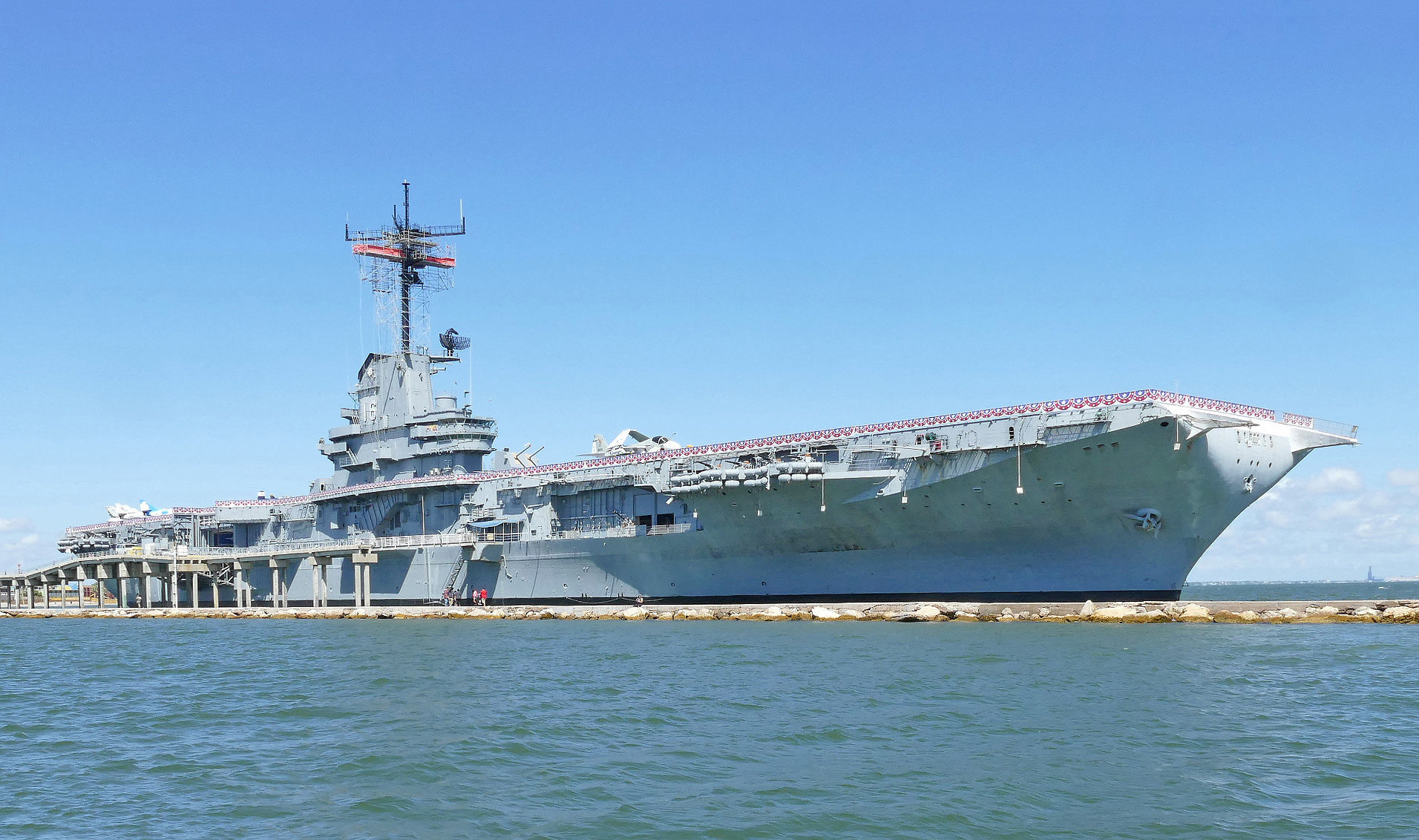
- From top, left to right: San Antonio skyline, Alamo Mission, Point Isabel Lighthouse, city of McAllen, Texas A&M International University, and the USS Lexington

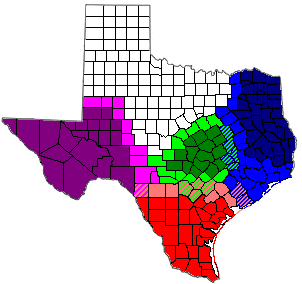
- South Texas counties in red
- Country: United States
- State: Texas
- Largest city: San Antonio

Population
  - Total: 5,000,000+
- Demonym: South Texan
- Dialects spoken: American Spanish; Texan English; Spanglish

South Texas is a geographic and cultural region of the U.S. state of Texas that lies roughly south of—and includes—San Antonio. It is bordered by the Rio Grande to the south and west, and by the Gulf of Mexico to the east. The population of this region is more than 5 million according to the 2024 census estimates. The southern portion of this region is often referred to as the Rio Grande Valley. The eastern portion along the Gulf of Mexico is also referred to as the Coastal Bend.

Greater Houston and Beaumont–Port Arthur are occasionally tied to the region because they are on the southern end of the state and for businesses that use "South Texas" in its name. (i.e. South Texas School of Law, South Texas State Fair, etc.). However, the two are more commonly associated with East Texas or Southeast Texas.

== Geography ==
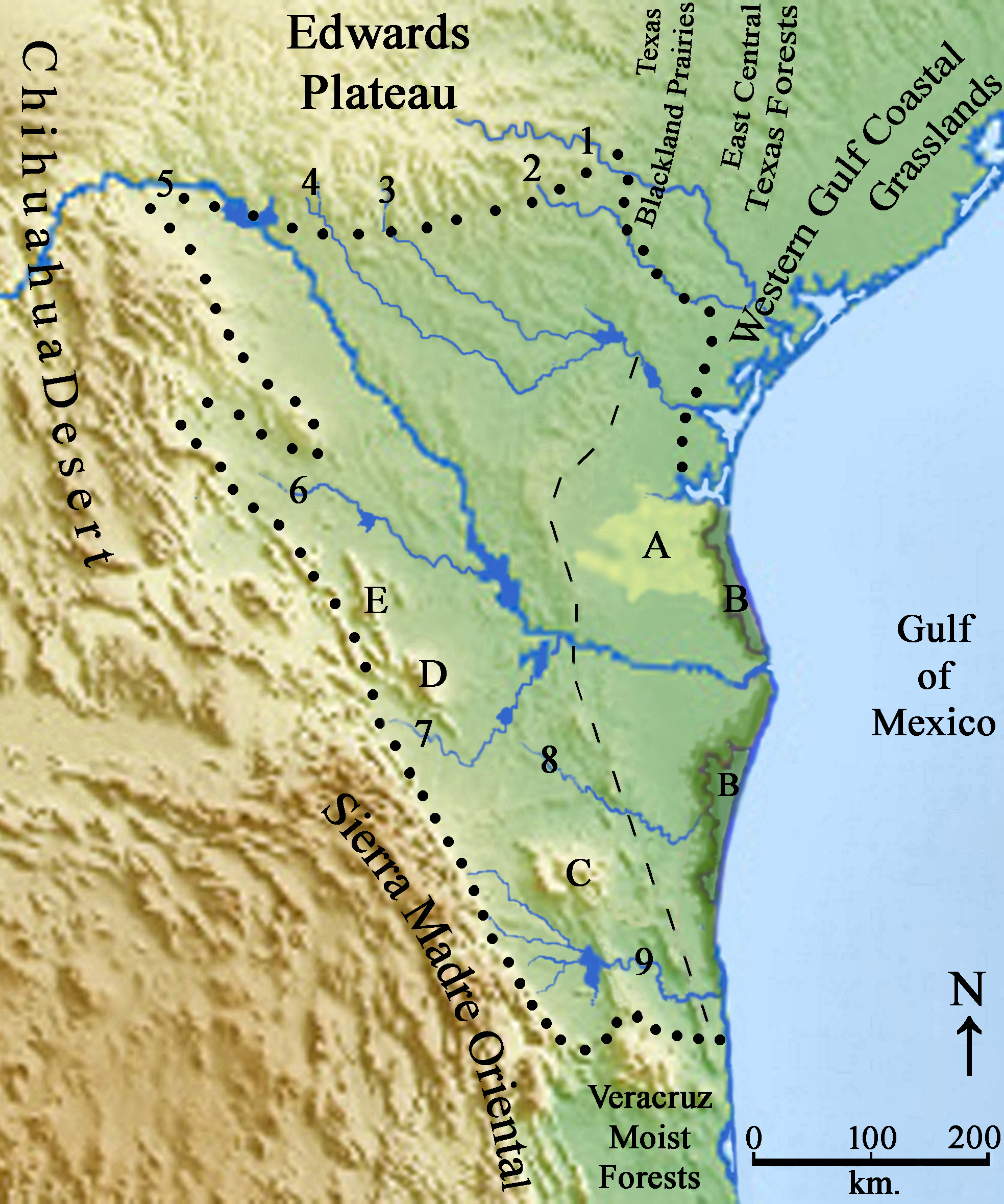
Tamaulipan biotic province = dotted line, Bordas Escarpment = dashed line. A = Costal Sand Plains; B = Laguna Madre; C = Sierra San Carlos; D = Sierra Los Picachos; E = Sierra de Lampazos. 1. Guadalupe River; 2. San Antonio River; 3. Frio River; 4. Nueces River; 5. Rio Grande / Rio Bravo; 6. Rio Salado/Rio Sabinas; 7. Rio San Juan; 8. Rio San Fernando; 9. Rio Soto La Marina.

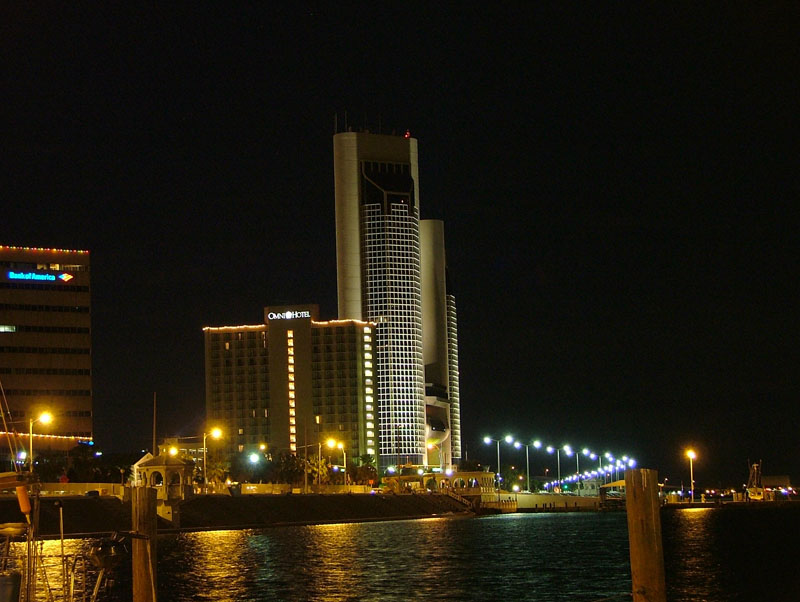
Corpus Christi is the second largest city in South Texas.

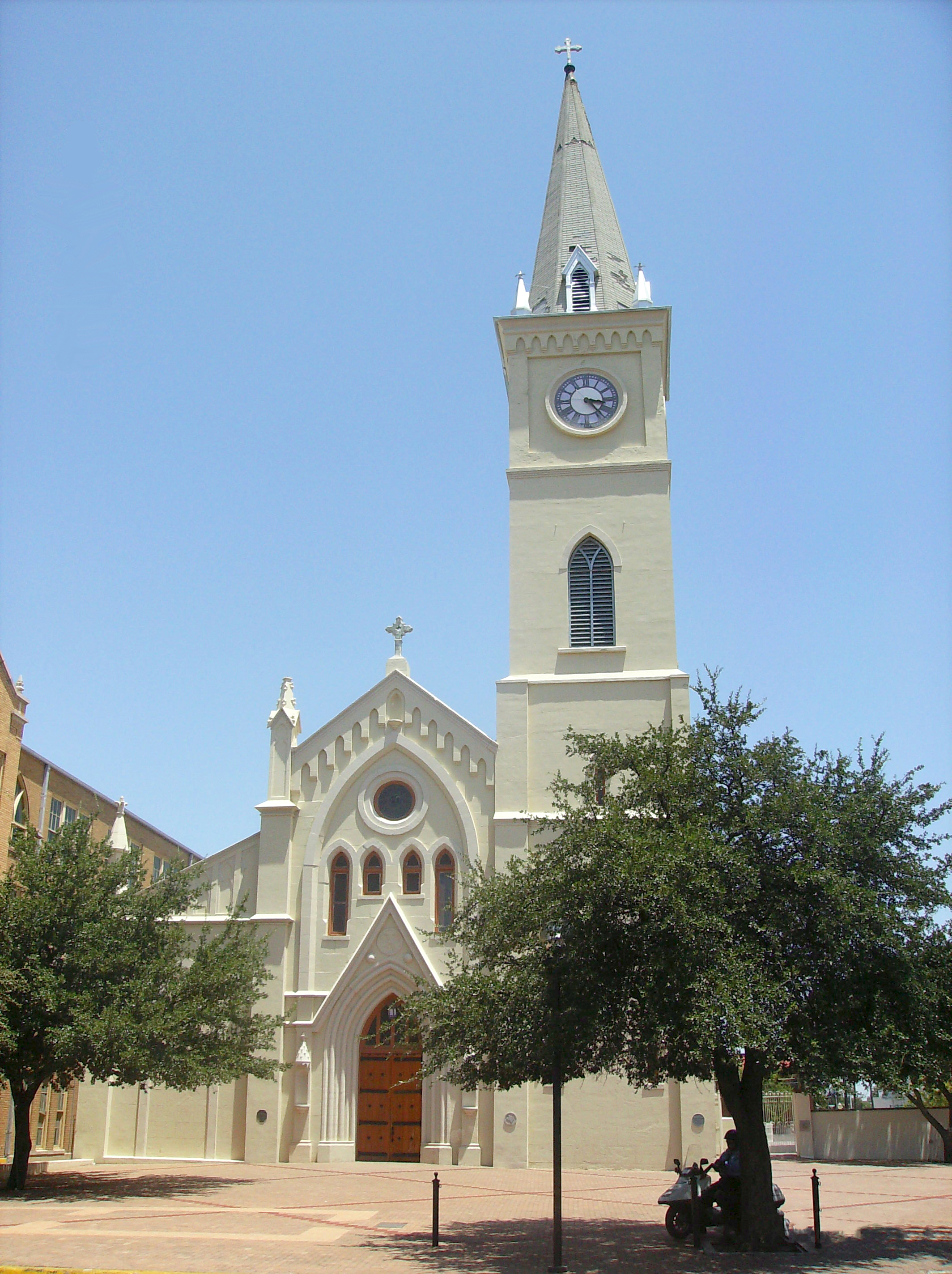
Laredo is the third largest city in South Texas. The San Agustin Cathedral was built during the Spanish Texas period.

There is no defined northern boundary, although it is believed to be at the city of San Antonio and from an east to west line extending from the Rio Grande near Maverick County to the Gulf of Mexico, but turning southeast at or near Lavaca County, and continuing towards the Gulf of Mexico to separate it from East Texas and Southeast Texas. The Rio Grande serves as the western and southern boundaries and separates Texas from Mexico. The eastern portion of South Texas is bordered by the Gulf of Mexico. South Texas consists of 41 counties. Its terrain is flat, lying on the coastal plain. South Texas is so vast, that there are even subregions. The very southern tip of South Texas, called the Rio Grande Valley, has fertile soils and is known for its citrus production. The eastern portion of South Texas is often referred to as the Coastal Bend; here, coastal salt marshes, estuaries, and wetlands are scattered all around. The western and central parts are known as the South Texas Plains or the Brush Country. Mesquite trees and crop fields dominate the Brush Country.

=== Counties ===
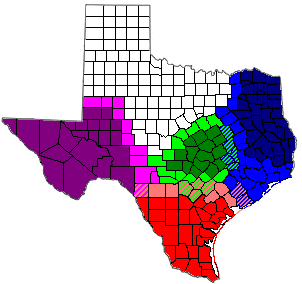
South Texas is depicted in red. Counties sometimes considered part of South Texas are in a lighter shade of red.

- Aransas
- Atascosa
- Bee
- Bexar
- Brooks
- Calhoun
- Cameron
- DeWitt
- Dimmit
- Duval
- Frio
- Goliad
- Gonzales
- Guadalupe
- Hidalgo
- Jackson
- Jim Hogg
- Jim Wells
- Karnes
- Kenedy
- Kinney
- Kleberg
- La Salle
- Lavaca
- Live Oak
- Matagorda
- Maverick
- McMullen
- Medina
- Nueces
- Refugio
- San Patricio
- Starr
- Uvalde
- Victoria
- Webb
- Wharton
- Willacy
- Wilson
- Zapata
- Zavala
- The fastest growing county in South Texas is Guadalupe, growing by 31.3% from 2010 to 2020.
- The slowest growing county in South Texas is Refugio, shrinking by 8.7% from 2010 to 2020.

=== Cities ===
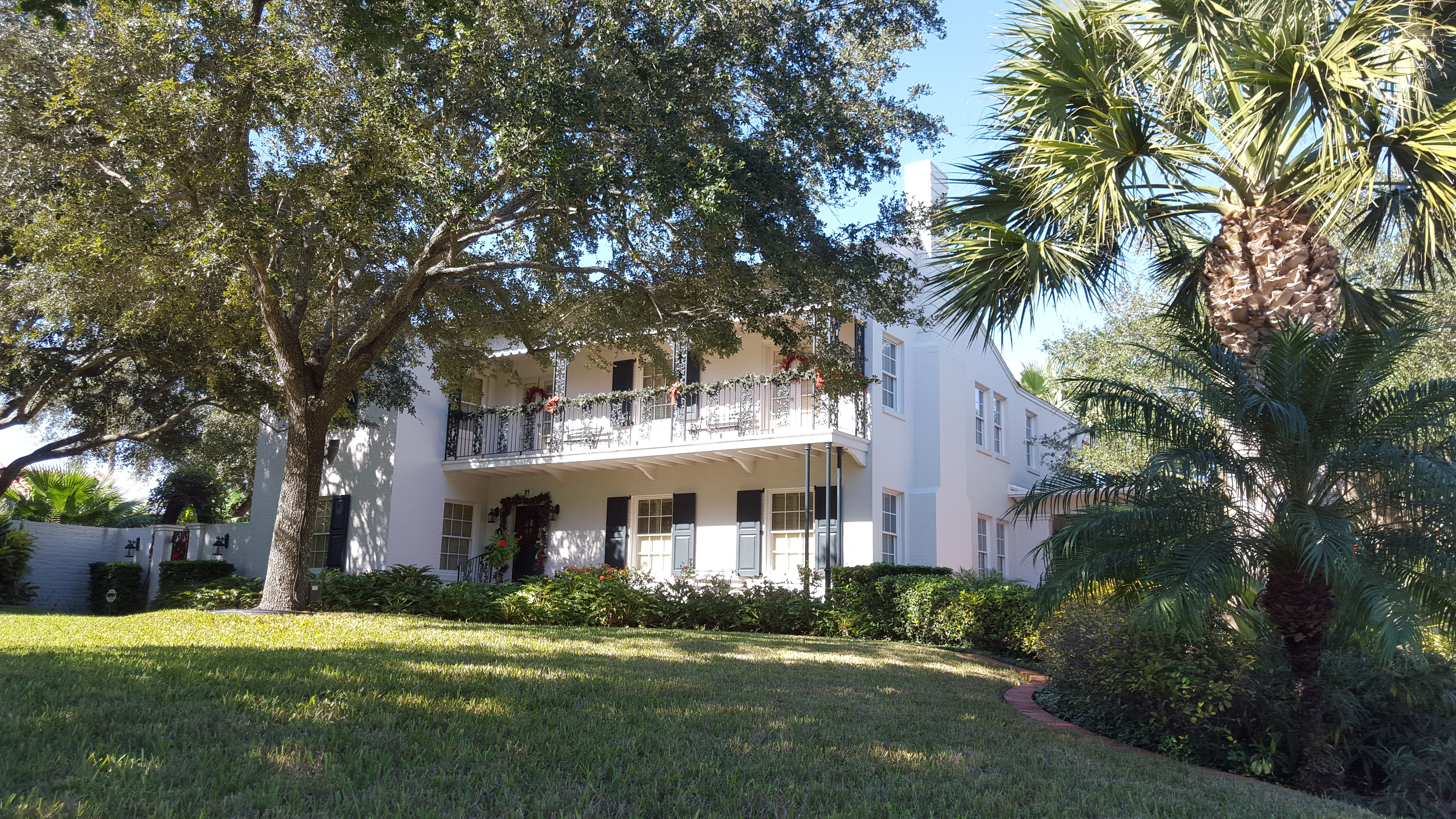
Brownsville is the fourth largest city in South Texas.

Region rank	City	2020 Census	2010 Census	% change	County
1	San Antonio	1,434,625	1,327,407	+8.08%	Bexar
2	Corpus Christi	317,863	305,215	+4.14%	Nueces
3	Laredo	263,640	236,091	+11.67%	Webb
4	Brownsville	186,738	175,023	+6.69%	Cameron
5	McAllen	142,210	129,877	+9.50%	Hidalgo
6	Edinburg	100,243	77,100	+30.02%	Hidalgo
7	Mission	85,778	77,058	+11.32%	Hidalgo
8	Pharr	79,715	70,400	+13.23%	Hidalgo
9	Harlingen	71,829	64,849	+0.95%	Cameron
10	Victoria	65,534	62,592	+4.70%	Victoria
11	Schertz	42,002	31,465	+33.49%	Guadalupe
12	Weslaco	40,160	35,670	+12.59%	Hidalgo
13	San Juan	35,294	33,856	+4.25%	Hidalgo
14	Seguin	29,433	25,175	+16.91%	Guadalupe
15	Eagle Pass	28,130	26,248	+7.17%	Maverick
16	Converse	27,466	18,198	+50.93%	Bexar
17	Kingsville	25,402	26,213	-3.09%	Kleberg
18	San Benito	24,861	24,250	+2.52%	Cameron
19	Universal City	19,720	18,530	+6.42%	Bexar
20	Alamo	19,493	18,353	+6.21%	Hidalgo

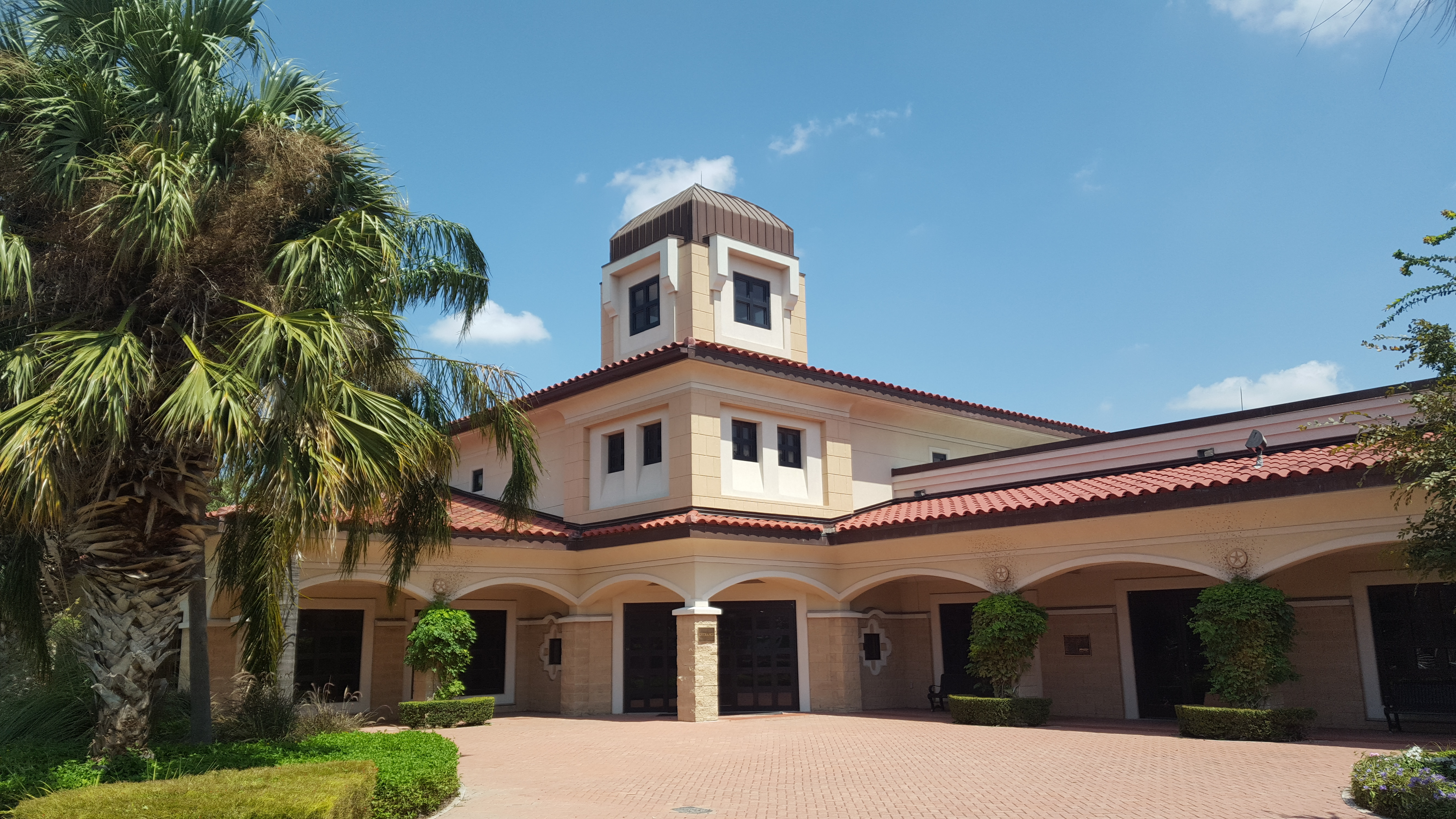
McAllen is the fifth largest city in South Texas.

Some people consider Houston to be in South Texas for several reasons: numerous businesses in the Houston region contain 'South Texas' in their titles. The United States District Court for the Southern District of Texas includes the Houston division. However, Houston is most accurately classified as being within Southeast Texas, a subregion of East Texas.

=== Rivers ===
Name	Note
Rio Grande	The border between Texas and Mexico
Nueces River	At one time considered by Mexico as the border between Texas and Mexico
San Antonio River	Part of the river is the location of San Antonio's Famous River Walk.
Aransas River	A short river that drains in Copano Bay.
Frio River	A fairly cold river, hence the name Frio, which means "cold" in Spanish.
Atascosa River	A short river that empties into the Frio River
Mission River	Flows into Mission Bay
Leona River	A tributary of the Frio River, within the Nueces River Basin
Guadalupe River	Flows into the San Antonio Bay estuary at Guadalupe Bay

=== Lakes and reservoirs ===
- Choke Canyon Reservoir
- Lake Corpus Christi
- Falcon Lake
- Lake Amistad
- Lake Findley
- Mitchell Lake
- Lake Casa Blanca
- Brauning Lake
- Calaveras Lake

=== Bays ===
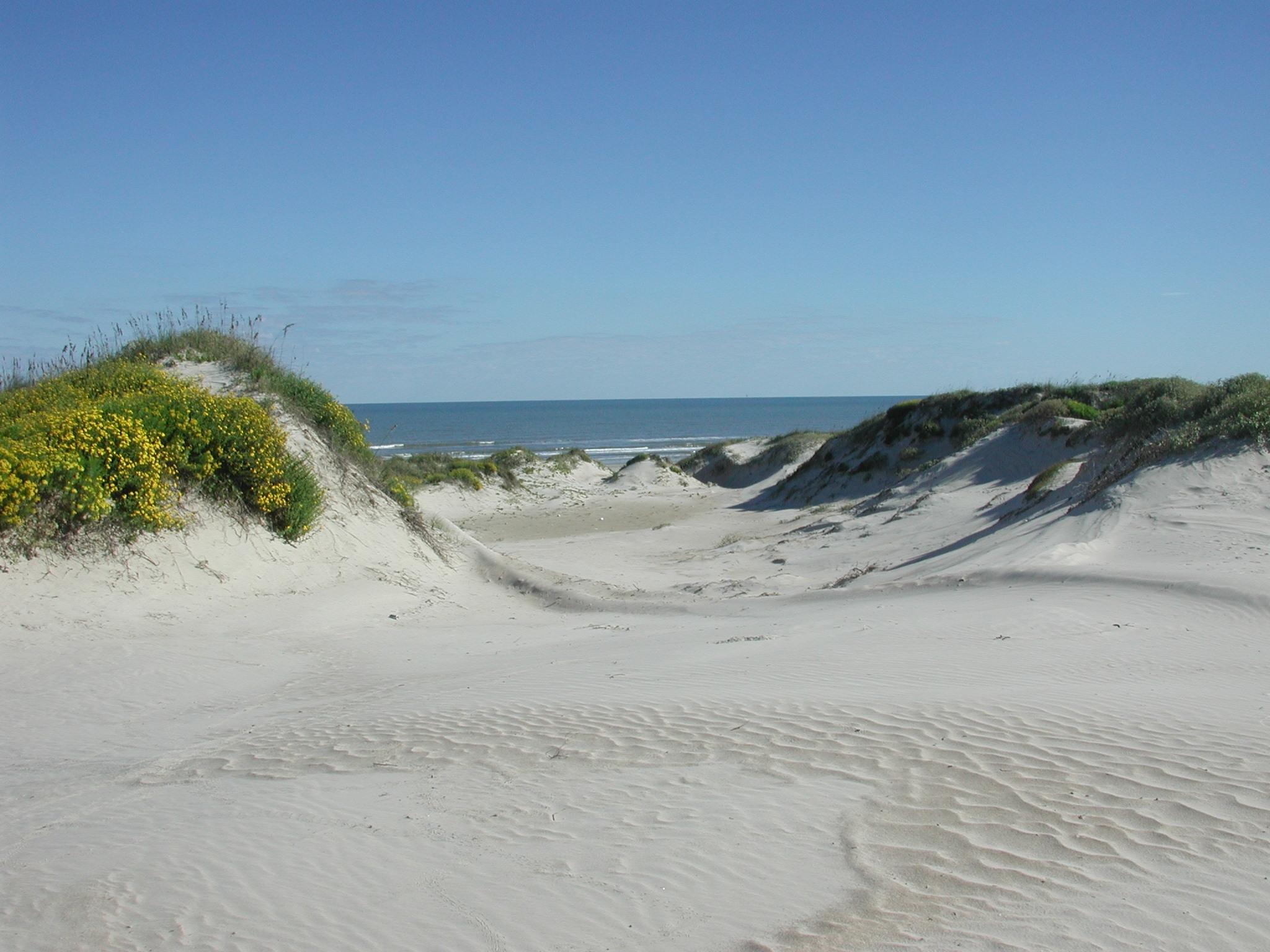
Padre Island is a popular beach destination.

- Corpus Christi Bay
- San Antonio Bay
- Baffin Bay
- Nueces Bay
- Oso Bay
- Copano Bay
- Aransas Bay
- Matagorda Bay
- Lavaca Bay
- Redfish Bay
- Mission Bay

=== Estuaries and waterways ===
- Rincon Bayou - a bayou in the Nueces River Delta, just north of the mouth of the Nueces River, for Location, see Nueces Bay
- Elm Bayou - a bayou on the Victoria-Refugio County line
- Gulf Intracoastal Waterway - a navigable route along the Gulf of Mexico without many of the hazards of travel on the open sea
- Resacas of the Rio Grande Valley - many oxbow lakes found scattered throughout the lower Rio Grande Valley
- Laguna Madre - a long, hypersaline bay that creates a barrier between Padre Island and mainland Texas

=== Islands ===
- Padre Island
  - North Padre Island
  - South Padre Island
- Mustang Island
- Matagorda Island
- Ward Island
- San José Island

=== Climate ===
The climate of South Texas is varied. The area along the Mexican border is generally semi-arid (Köppen climate classification BSh), while the area from the coast inland to just west of San Antonio has a humid subtropical climate (Köppen Cfa). South Texas weather is affected by the Sierra Madre Oriental mountains to the west, the Gulf of Mexico to the east, and the Chihuahuan Desert to the west/northwest. Moisture from the Pacific is cut off by the Mexican Sierra Madre Occidental and Oriental mountain ranges. Along the coast the climate is best exemplified in the summers when humidity is extremely high though at times arid, depending upon whether tropical moisture from the Gulf and sometimes from the Pacific is flowing in or if the region is cut off from any moisture by high pressure systems, causing long droughts, which occur every few years. Temperatures reach freezing only a few times in the winter and snowfall is rare, usually three inches or less. Summers in this zone are hot and humid, with daily averages above 90 °F or 32.2 °C. In addition, areas in Texas that are slightly inland from the Gulf of Mexico, such as San Antonio that border the semi-arid climate zone, generally see a peak of precipitation in the spring, and a deep, drought-like nadir in midsummer. The region itself sees a short wet season from March to May and another one from late August to October, and a dry season elsewhere in the year. Night-time temperatures are around 85 °F or 29.4 °C in summer. The region of South Texas includes the semi-arid ranch country and the wetter Rio Grande Valley. Considered to be the southernmost tip of the American Great Plains region, the inland region has rainfall similar to that of the Northern Plains. The coastal areas are warm most of the year due to currents of the Gulf of Mexico, but can get cold in winter if a strong front comes in, occasionally causing snow at sea level. Rain in the coastal region is more abundant than in the inland region, and subtropical forests line the Rio Grande. Inland, where it is drier, ranches dominate the landscape, characterized by thick, spiny brush and grasslands. The winters in the inland region are cooler and drier, as Arctic air can make it into the region, but snow is rare due to the lack of humidity. Summers are for the most part hot and dry, but at times can be humid if winds come off the warmer Gulf of Mexico. Tornadoes can occur in this region, but less frequently than in other parts of the state.

Climate data for San Antonio (San Antonio Int'l), 1991–2020 normals, (Note: Mean monthly maxima and minima (i.e., the highest and lowest temperature readings during an entire month or year) calculated based on data at said location from 1991 to 2020.) extremes 1885–present (Note: Official records for San Antonio were kept at downtown from March 1885 to December 1940, at Stinson Municipal Airport from January 1941 to June 1942, and at San Antonio Int'l since July 1942. For more information, see Threadex)
Month	Jan	Feb	Mar	Apr	May	Jun	Jul	Aug	Sep	Oct	Nov	Dec	Year
Record high °F (°C)	89 (32)	100 (38)	100 (38)	101 (38)	104 (40)	108 (42)	107 (42)	110 (43)	111 (44)	99 (37)	94 (34)	90 (32)	111 (44)
Mean maximum °F (°C)	80.3 (26.8)	84.9 (29.4)	88.9 (31.6)	92.2 (33.4)	96.0 (35.6)	98.9 (37.2)	100.5 (38.1)	102.1 (38.9)	98.7 (37.1)	93.1 (33.9)	85.1 (29.5)	80.6 (27.0)	103.8 (39.9)
Mean daily maximum °F (°C)	63.3 (17.4)	67.5 (19.7)	73.8 (23.2)	80.3 (26.8)	86.6 (30.3)	92.4 (33.6)	94.9 (34.9)	96.0 (35.6)	90.1 (32.3)	82.2 (27.9)	71.7 (22.1)	64.7 (18.2)	80.3 (26.8)
Daily mean °F (°C)	52.2 (11.2)	56.3 (13.5)	62.8 (17.1)	69.4 (20.8)	76.5 (24.7)	82.6 (28.1)	84.8 (29.3)	85.5 (29.7)	79.9 (26.6)	71.3 (21.8)	60.7 (15.9)	53.5 (11.9)	69.6 (20.9)
Mean daily minimum °F (°C)	41.0 (5.0)	45.1 (7.3)	51.8 (11.0)	58.4 (14.7)	66.4 (19.1)	72.7 (22.6)	74.7 (23.7)	74.9 (23.8)	69.6 (20.9)	60.4 (15.8)	49.8 (9.9)	42.4 (5.8)	58.9 (14.9)
Mean minimum °F (°C)	26.2 (−3.2)	29.0 (−1.7)	33.7 (0.9)	41.6 (5.3)	53.1 (11.7)	65.3 (18.5)	70.2 (21.2)	69.4 (20.8)	57.4 (14.1)	41.8 (5.4)	32.2 (0.1)	27.4 (−2.6)	23.5 (−4.7)
Record low °F (°C)	0 (−18)	4 (−16)	19 (−7)	31 (−1)	42 (6)	48 (9)	60 (16)	57 (14)	41 (5)	27 (−3)	21 (−6)	6 (−14)	0 (−18)
Average precipitation inches (mm)	1.96 (50)	1.74 (44)	2.31 (59)	2.42 (61)	4.40 (112)	3.28 (83)	2.41 (61)	2.15 (55)	3.88 (99)	3.75 (95)	2.08 (53)	2.00 (51)	32.38 (822)
Average snowfall inches (cm)	0.0 (0.0)	0.1 (0.25)	0.0 (0.0)	0.0 (0.0)	0.0 (0.0)	0.0 (0.0)	0.0 (0.0)	0.0 (0.0)	0.0 (0.0)	0.0 (0.0)	0.0 (0.0)	0.1 (0.25)	0.2 (0.51)
Average precipitation days (≥ 0.01 in)	6.9	7.4	8.5	6.4	8.3	7.0	5.0	4.7	6.9	6.4	6.4	7.4	81.3
Average snowy days (≥ 0.1 in)	0.0	0.3	0.0	0.0	0.0	0.0	0.0	0.0	0.0	0.0	0.0	0.0	0.3
Average relative humidity (%)	67.1	65.2	63.2	66.3	70.5	68.8	65.0	64.7	68.0	67.2	68.3	68.0	66.9
Average dew point °F (°C)	37.0 (2.8)	39.9 (4.4)	46.8 (8.2)	55.6 (13.1)	63.7 (17.6)	68.4 (20.2)	68.9 (20.5)	68.5 (20.3)	65.7 (18.7)	57.0 (13.9)	48.0 (8.9)	40.1 (4.5)	55.0 (12.8)
Mean monthly sunshine hours	159.4	169.7	215.5	209.7	221.8	275.9	308.8	293.9	234.9	218.0	171.9	149.7	2,629.2
Percentage possible sunshine	49	54	58	54	52	66	72	72	63	61	54	47	59
Source: NOAA (relative humidity, dew point and sun 1961–1990)

Climate data for Corpus Christi, Texas (Corpus Christi Int'l), 1981–2010 normals
Month	Jan	Feb	Mar	Apr	May	Jun	Jul	Aug	Sep	Oct	Nov	Dec	Year
Record high °F (°C)	91 (33)	97 (36)	102 (39)	102 (39)	103 (39)	107 (42)	105 (41)	107 (42)	109 (43)	101 (38)	98 (37)	91 (33)	109 (43)
Mean daily maximum °F (°C)	66.9 (19.4)	70.4 (21.3)	75.9 (24.4)	81.7 (27.6)	86.6 (30.3)	90.9 (32.7)	93.1 (33.9)	94.4 (34.7)	90.1 (32.3)	84.4 (29.1)	76.0 (24.4)	68.4 (20.2)	81.6 (27.6)
Daily mean °F (°C)	57.1 (13.9)	60.5 (15.8)	66.1 (18.9)	72.4 (22.4)	78.3 (25.7)	82.4 (28.0)	83.9 (28.8)	84.7 (29.3)	81.1 (27.3)	74.5 (23.6)	66.1 (18.9)	58.5 (14.7)	72.1 (22.3)
Mean daily minimum °F (°C)	47.2 (8.4)	50.5 (10.3)	56.3 (13.5)	63.0 (17.2)	70.0 (21.1)	73.9 (23.3)	74.8 (23.8)	75.0 (23.9)	72.0 (22.2)	64.8 (18.2)	56.2 (13.4)	48.6 (9.2)	62.7 (17.1)
Record low °F (°C)	14 (−10)	11 (−12)	24 (−4)	33 (1)	45 (7)	56 (13)	64 (18)	64 (18)	52 (11)	28 (−2)	27 (−3)	13 (−11)	11 (−12)
Average precipitation inches (mm)	1.54 (39)	1.92 (49)	1.89 (48)	1.84 (47)	3.07 (78)	3.36 (85)	2.79 (71)	2.92 (74)	4.97 (126)	3.64 (92)	1.97 (50)	1.82 (46)	31.73 (805)
Average precipitation days (≥ 0.01 in)	7.1	6.5	5.3	5.3	6.0	6.8	5.7	6.5	8.8	6.3	6.0	6.4	76.6
Average relative humidity (%)	60.5	78.0	76.0	76.0	77.5	80.0	78.5	75.0	74.5	75.5	73.5	74.0	78.0

Climate data for Laredo, TX
Month	Jan	Feb	Mar	Apr	May	Jun	Jul	Aug	Sep	Oct	Nov	Dec	Year
Record high °F (°C)	95 (35)	103 (39)	105 (41)	110 (43)	114 (46)	114 (46)	113 (45)	111 (44)	110 (43)	104 (40)	99 (37)	95 (35)	114 (46)
Mean daily maximum °F (°C)	67.9 (19.9)	72.8 (22.7)	80.7 (27.1)	88.4 (31.3)	94.4 (34.7)	98.9 (37.2)	100.1 (37.8)	100.7 (38.2)	94.3 (34.6)	87.0 (30.6)	77.2 (25.1)	68.6 (20.3)	85.9 (29.9)
Mean daily minimum °F (°C)	45.4 (7.4)	49.7 (9.8)	56.3 (13.5)	63.6 (17.6)	70.8 (21.6)	75.2 (24.0)	76.0 (24.4)	76.3 (24.6)	72.0 (22.2)	64.6 (18.1)	54.5 (12.5)	46.1 (7.8)	62.5 (16.9)
Record low °F (°C)	19 (−7)	20 (−7)	27 (−3)	32 (0)	45 (7)	58 (14)	66 (19)	61 (16)	49 (9)	28 (−2)	27 (−3)	11 (−12)	11 (−12)
Average rainfall inches (mm)	0.88 (22)	0.94 (24)	1.11 (28)	1.45 (37)	2.48 (63)	2.23 (57)	2.20 (56)	1.93 (49)	2.93 (74)	2.21 (56)	1.10 (28)	0.88 (22)	20.34 (516)
Average rainy days (≥ 0.01 in)	6.0	5.3	4.4	4.2	5.3	5.1	4.8	5.1	6.7	4.4	4.3	5.6	61.2
Source: Weather Channel (extremes)

Climate data for Brownsville, Texas
Month	Jan	Feb	Mar	Apr	May	Jun	Jul	Aug	Sep	Oct	Nov	Dec	Year
Record high °F (°C)	91 (33)	94 (34)	106 (41)	102 (39)	102 (39)	103 (39)	103 (39)	104 (40)	105 (41)	99 (37)	98 (37)	94 (34)	106 (41)
Mean daily maximum °F (°C)	70.7 (21.5)	73.9 (23.3)	79.0 (26.1)	83.9 (28.8)	88.6 (31.4)	92.3 (33.5)	93.7 (34.3)	94.5 (34.7)	90.6 (32.6)	85.7 (29.8)	79.2 (26.2)	72.0 (22.2)	83.7 (28.7)
Daily mean °F (°C)	61.2 (16.2)	64.3 (17.9)	69.3 (20.7)	74.9 (23.8)	80.5 (26.9)	84.0 (28.9)	85.0 (29.4)	85.4 (29.7)	81.9 (27.7)	76.3 (24.6)	69.4 (20.8)	62.4 (16.9)	74.6 (23.7)
Mean daily minimum °F (°C)	51.6 (10.9)	54.7 (12.6)	59.6 (15.3)	65.9 (18.8)	72.3 (22.4)	75.7 (24.3)	76.3 (24.6)	76.2 (24.6)	73.1 (22.8)	66.9 (19.4)	59.6 (15.3)	52.7 (11.5)	65.4 (18.6)
Record low °F (°C)	18 (−8)	12 (−11)	28 (−2)	37 (3)	41 (5)	56 (13)	57 (14)	63 (17)	51 (11)	35 (2)	27 (−3)	16 (−9)	12 (−11)
Average rainfall inches (mm)	1.27 (32)	1.12 (28)	1.23 (31)	1.54 (39)	2.64 (67)	2.57 (65)	2.04 (52)	2.44 (62)	5.92 (150)	3.74 (95)	1.82 (46)	1.15 (29)	27.48 (696)
Average rainy days (≥ 0.01 in)	7.7	5.4	4.2	4.0	5.0	6.6	5.0	7.2	9.3	7.3	5.9	7.2	74.8
Mean monthly sunshine hours	130.2	152.6	207.7	234.0	266.6	306.0	334.8	306.9	252.0	229.4	165.0	130.2	2,715.4
Source 1: National Weather Service (normals 1981−2010)
Source 2: Hong Kong Observatory (sun, 1961−1990)

Climate data for Victoria, Texas
Month	Jan	Feb	Mar	Apr	May	Jun	Jul	Aug	Sep	Oct	Nov	Dec	Year
Record high °F (°C)	88 (31)	96 (36)	99 (37)	100 (38)	102 (39)	107 (42)	110 (43)	109 (43)	111 (44)	109 (43)	93 (34)	88 (31)	111 (44)
Mean daily maximum °F (°C)	62.8 (17.1)	66.6 (19.2)	73.4 (23.0)	79.2 (26.2)	85.1 (29.5)	90.3 (32.4)	93.4 (34.1)	93.7 (34.3)	89.9 (32.2)	83.0 (28.3)	73.0 (22.8)	65.2 (18.4)	79.6 (26.5)
Mean daily minimum °F (°C)	43.6 (6.4)	46.7 (8.2)	53.9 (12.2)	60.1 (15.6)	68.1 (20.1)	73.3 (22.9)	75.0 (23.9)	74.6 (23.7)	70.3 (21.3)	61.6 (16.4)	52.3 (11.3)	45.2 (7.3)	60.4 (15.8)
Record low °F (°C)	9 (−13)	15 (−9)	21 (−6)	33 (1)	40 (4)	54 (12)	61 (16)	61 (16)	45 (7)	31 (−1)	18 (−8)	9 (−13)	9 (−13)
Average precipitation inches (mm)	2.44 (62)	2.04 (52)	2.25 (57)	2.97 (75)	5.12 (130)	4.96 (126)	2.90 (74)	3.05 (77)	5.00 (127)	4.26 (108)	2.64 (67)	2.47 (63)	40.1 (1,018)
Source: National Weather Service

Hurricanes are the most dangerous weather systems to affect South Texas. Hurricane season is between June and November. However, the Texas coast gets affected usually between August and September, when systems sporadically organize in the southern Gulf around the Bay of Campeche or western Caribbean and the latter months forming off the coast of Africa.

Droughts- Although South Texas summers generally see rainfall in summer months, some years the lack of rain is persistent and leads to water shortages; lake levels drop significantly and lead to municipal water restrictions. In the summer of 2011, numerous records were set. On August 28, 2011, most of South Texas had temperatures reaching 110 °F, breaking many cities' record highs. Furthermore, 95% of the state faced an extreme or exceptional drought, according to the office of the Texas state climatologist. These drought conditions led to a string of dangerous wildfires across the state, and the enforcement of burn bans in 250 of the 254 counties in Texas.

Tornadoes do occur in this part of the state, but not as frequently as other parts. They approach, usually from the northwest to southeast, as a line of severe thunderstorms, mostly in the summer months and by cold fronts in fall.

Snow rarely falls south of San Antonio or on the coast except in rare circumstances. Of note is the 2004 Christmas Eve snowstorm, when 6 inches (150 mm) of snow fell as far south as McAllen.

== Wildlife ==
=== Reptiles ===
- Texas tortoise
- Texas horned lizard
- Texas spiny lizard
- Green anole
- American alligator
- Western diamondback rattlesnake
- Texas coral snake
- Desert massasauga rattlesnake
- Kemp's ridley sea turtle
- Loggerhead sea turtle
- Leatherback sea turtle
- Green sea turtle
- Hawksbill sea turtle

=== Mammals ===
- Coyote
- Javelina
- Virginia opossum
- Bobcat
- White-tailed deer
- Mountain lion
- Jaguar
- Jaguarundi
- Ocelot
- Mexican long-nosed armadillo
- Black-tailed jackrabbit
- Desert cottontail
- Striped skunk
- Ring-tailed cat

=== Sealife ===
- Bottlenose dolphin
- West Indian manatee
- Barracuda
- Bluefish
- Tarpon
- Tiger shark
- Red drum
- Blue crab
- Stone crab
- Fiddler crab
- Lightning whelk
- Atlantic Spanish mackerel
- King mackerel
- Pinfish
- Pigfish
- Gafftopsail catfish
- Hardhead catfish
- Atlantic cutlassfish
- Atlantic croaker
- Striped mullet
- American eel
- Black drum
- Spotted seatrout
- Greater amberjack
- Florida pompano
- Common snook
- Crevalle jack
- Tripletail
- Cobia
- Eastern oyster
- Red snapper
- Vermilion snapper
- Sheepshead
- Lane snapper
- Bull shark
- Shortfin mako
- Atlantic blue marlin
- Southern flounder

=== Arthropods ===
- Southern black widow
- Black widow
- Brown recluse
- Texas brown tarantula
- Giant desert centipede
- Texas tan tarantula
- Fire ant
- Brown widow

=== Birds ===
- Northern mockingbird
- Laughing gull
- American herring gull
- White-winged dove
- Green jay
- Brown pelican
- American white ibis
- Great white heron
- Osprey
- Anhinga
- Monk parakeet
- Roseate spoonbill
- Reddish egret
- Red-crowned parrot

== Demographics and culture ==
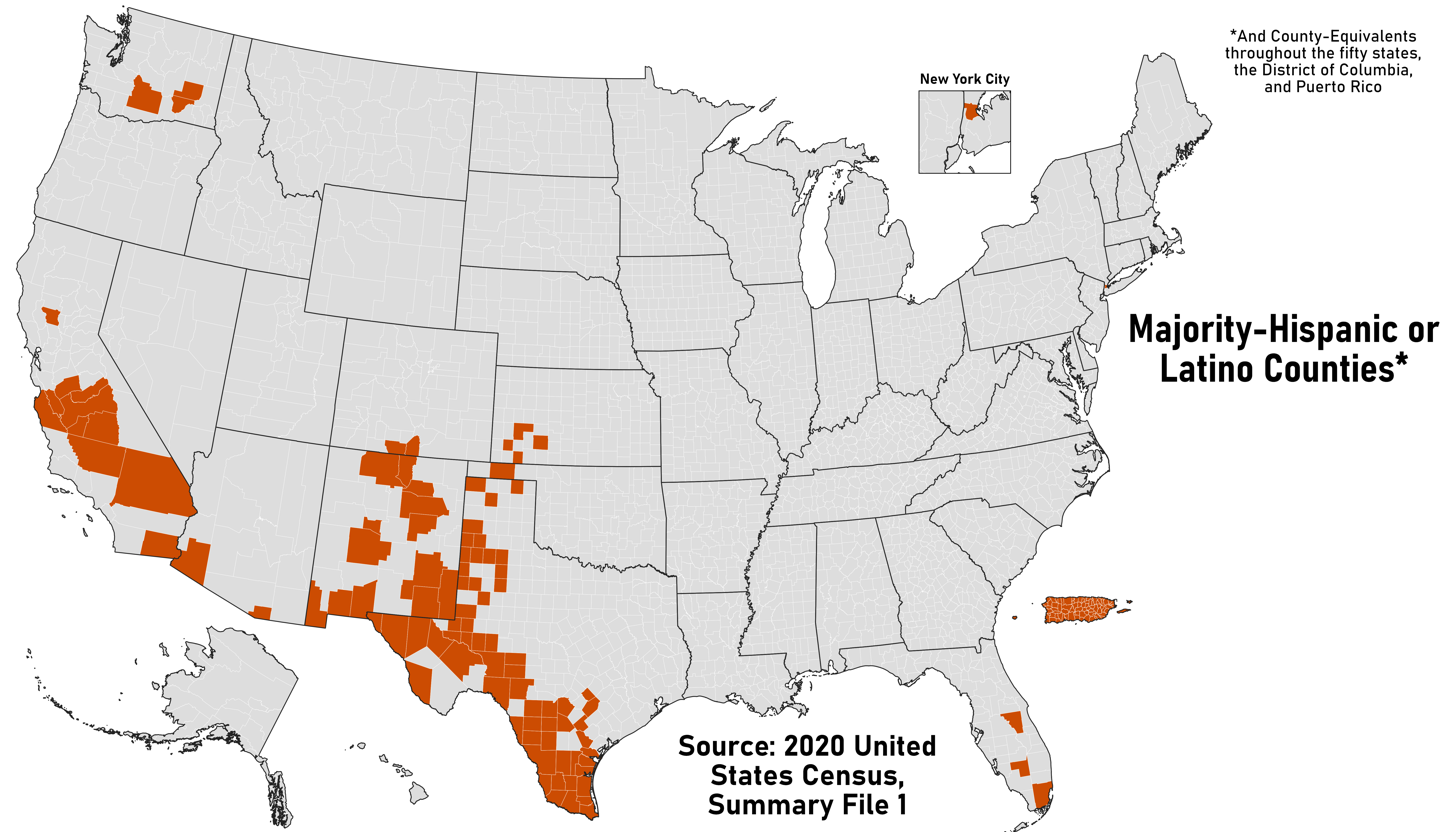
Majority-Hispanic counties in the U.S. as of the 2020 United States Census

=== Multicultural influences ===
South Texas is well known for strong Hispanic, primarily Mexican American and Tejano (the Spanish term for "Texan") influences, due to its proximity to Mexico. Tejanos and Mexicans living in South Texas are descended from the Spanish and Sephardic Jewish settlers of Mexico, from Mexican indigenous groups allied with the Spanish, such as Tlaxcaltec and Otomi peoples, and from local indigenous groups of South Texas who were missionized by the Spanish, particularly Coahuiltecans. These migrations occurred and have been ongoing since the early 1700s in South Texas. The Treaty of Guadalupe Hidalgo in the 1840s failed to secure land belonging to the Mexican settlers. The disputed area was between the Nueces River south of San Antonio and Corpus Christi, the King Ranch, and the Rio Grande. Recognized by neither Mexico nor the United States, the Republic of the Rio Grande was established in this region in 1840, lasting less than a year. Laredo served as its capital.

In the 17th, 18th, 19th century, the land was sometimes called "the Old Indian Trading Grounds" due to the fact there were multiple small Native American communities that continuously resided within the region. Karankawas, Tonakawa, Penateka Comache, and Lipan Apache are the names of some of the tribes who found home in the land. Due to involvement with real estate deals during the US financial crisis of 1837 - 1838, a man who went by the name Henry Lawrence Kinney, immigrated from the state of Illinois to the at the time, dry deserted plains of South Texas within the year 1839. Despite the settlements before him, he is more often than not credited with founding and naming the city of Corpus Christi. In the early days if the Texas Revolution, trades on routes grew exponentially due to taxes and tariffs being collected from goods arriving on ships, but not the ones arriving on land. Given this, Kinney made the decision to establish himself on a very important part of the route used to move trading materials such as wool, hides, copper, lead, tobacco, textiles, and guns. Kinney and his wife, W.P. Aubrey built a house, a marketplace, and hired guards to protect cargo. Until the early 1840s, this area was known as "Kinney's Trading Post", or "Kinney and Aubrey's Rancho ". Despite this, a promoter claimed credited for coining the name Corpus Christi, and it was only after 1845 that the name Corpus Christi replaced Kinney's name.

The Rio Grande Valley area played a significant role in the Mexican War of Independence, the Texas Revolution, the Mexican–American War, and the American Civil War, with many historical battle sites around the area. General Robert E. Lee resided at Fort Ringold (Rio Grande City) during this time as a colonel. President Zachary Taylor was General of the Army at Fort Brown (Brownsville) during the Mexican–American War.

The Texas Rangers gained popularity for their actions in South Texas during the Mexican bandit raids in the late 19th and early 20th centuries. On May 25, 1876, a band of 40 Texas Rangers rode out of Laredo and headed north to the Nueces Strip. Their mission was to find, kill or capture John King Fisher, leader of a band of cattle rustlers and cut-throats who had been terrorizing the area. The Rangers were members of a select group known as the Special Force. Led by Leander McNelly, the Special Force was given the task to bring law and order to an area of South Texas that lay between Corpus Christi and the Mexican border.

== Politics ==
South Texas was long a Democratic stronghold, primarily due to its heavily Hispanic population and low voter turnout.

Republican Donald Trump improved in the region over his three runs. In 2024, Trump won the region as a whole.

South Texas presidential election results
Year	Democratic	Republican	Third parties
2024	45.5% 804,544	53.4% 944,998	1.1% 20,326
2020	51.1% 906,081	47.5% 843,200	1.4% 24,089
2016	51.7% 728,367	43.6% 614,951	4.7% 65,801
2012	52.2% 632,626	47.8% 578,268	0% 0

== Economy ==
=== Rice ===
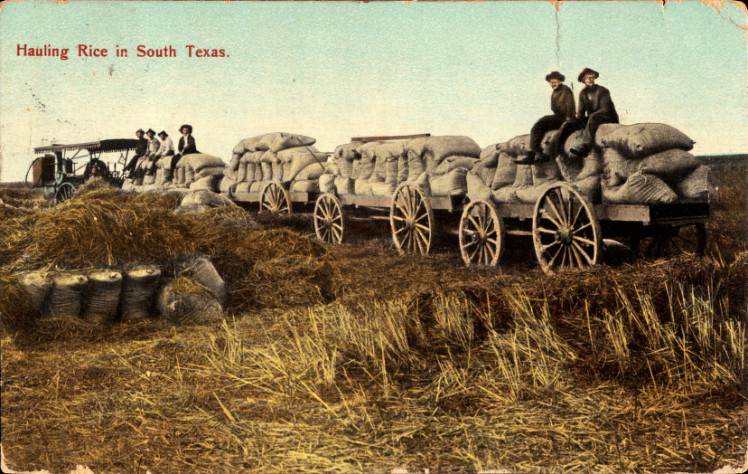
Hauling rice in South Texas (postcard, circa 1909)

An important event in the development of South Texas and the Texas Gulf Coast rice industry was the introduction of seed imported from Japan in 1904. The Houston Chamber of Commerce and the Southern Pacific Railroad invited Japanese farmers to Texas to help area farms in the production of rice. The seed the Japanese farmers brought with them was a gift from the Japanese emperor. The production of Japanese rice began at Webster in Harris County. The Gulf Coast rice industry is credited to the Saibara family.

== Transportation ==
=== Air ===
- San Antonio International Airport
- Corpus Christi International Airport
- Laredo International Airport
- Valley International Airport
- Victoria Regional Airport
- McAllen Miller International Airport
- Brownsville/South Padre Island International Airport
- Alice International Airport
- South Texas International Airport at Edinburg
- Aransas County Airport
- Kleberg County Airport
- Duval-Freer Airport
- Mustang Beach Airport
- San José Island Airport

=== Passenger rail ===
- San Antonio Amtrak station, serving two Amtrak lines; the Sunset Limited and the Texas Eagle; and Amtrak Thruway route serving Harlingen, Brownsville, and McAllen, Texas.

=== Major highways ===
==== Interstate ====
- I-2
- I-10
- I-35
- I-37
- I-69C
- I-69E
- I-69W
- I-169
- I-410

==== US Routes ====
- US 59
- US 77
- US 83
- US 87
- US 90
- US 181
- US 281

==== Texas State Highways ====
- TX 4
- TX 16
- TX 44
- TX 107
- TX 141
- TX 151
- TX 255
- TX 285
- TX 286
- TX 336
- TX 358
- TX 359
- TX 361
- TX 495

=== International bridges ===
Laredo

- Gateway to the Americas International Bridge
- Juárez–Lincoln International Bridge
- Texas Mexican Railway International Bridge
- World Trade International Bridge
- Laredo–Colombia Solidarity International Bridge

Eagle Pass

- Eagle Pass–Piedras Negras International Bridge
- Camino Real International Bridge
- Union Pacific International Railroad Bridge

Brownsville

- Brownsville & Matamoros International Bridge
- Veterans International Bridge at Los Tomates
- Gateway International Bridge

Los Indios

- Free Trade International Bridge

Falcon Heights

- Lake Falcon Dam International Crossing

Hidalgo
McAllen

- McAllen–Hidalgo–Reynosa International Bridge
- Anzalduas International Bridge

Pharr

- Pharr–Reynosa International Bridge

Progreso

- Progreso–Nuevo Progreso International Bridge

Rio Grande City

- Rio Grande City–Camargo International Bridge

Roma

- Roma–Ciudad Miguel Alemán International Bridge

== Tourism ==
San Antonio

- San Antonio Missions National Historical Park
- The Alamo
- Tobin Center for the Performing Arts
- Six Flags Fiesta Texas
- San Antonio River Walk
- San Antonio Zoo
- SeaWorld San Antonio
- San Antonio Museum of Art
- San Antonio Stock Show & Rodeo

Corpus Christi

- Mirador de la Flor (Selena memorial statue)
- Texas State Aquarium
- USS Lexington museum ship
- Mustang Island and Mustang Island State Park
- Padre Island National Seashore near Corpus Christi
- Bayfest
- Schlitterbahn

Laredo

- San Agustin de Laredo Historic District
- Republic of the Rio Grande Capitol Building Museum
- Washington's Birthday Celebration festivities during January and February

Rio Grande Valley

- South Padre Island
- Gladys Porter Zoo in Brownsville
- Basilica of the National Shrine of Our Lady of San Juan del Valle

Other

- King Ranch near Kingsville
- Aransas National Wildlife Refuge
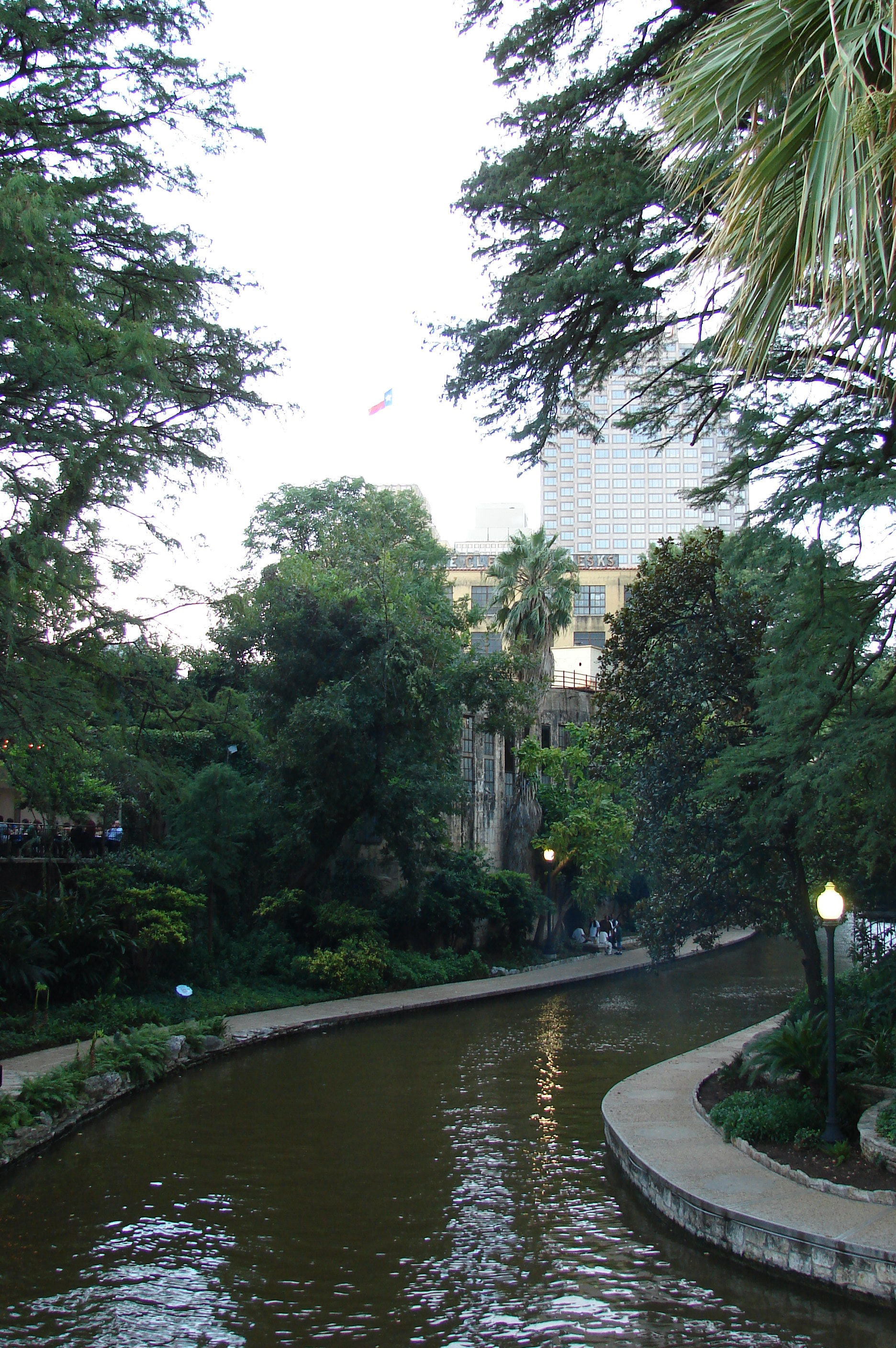
San Antonio River Walk

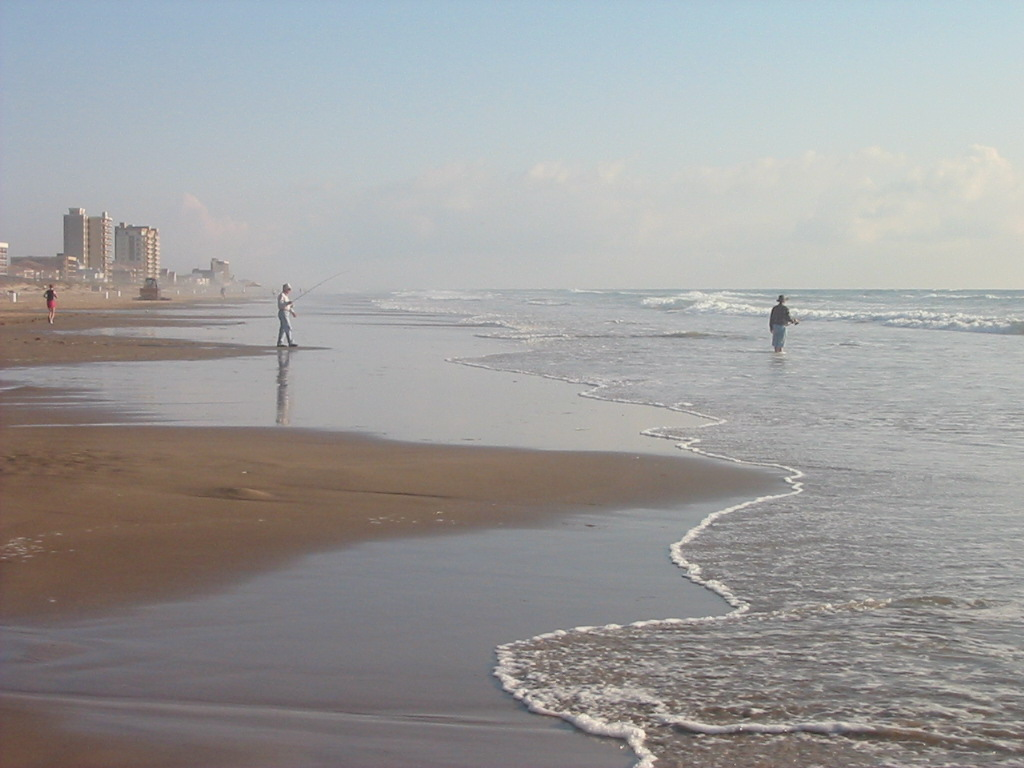
South Padre Island

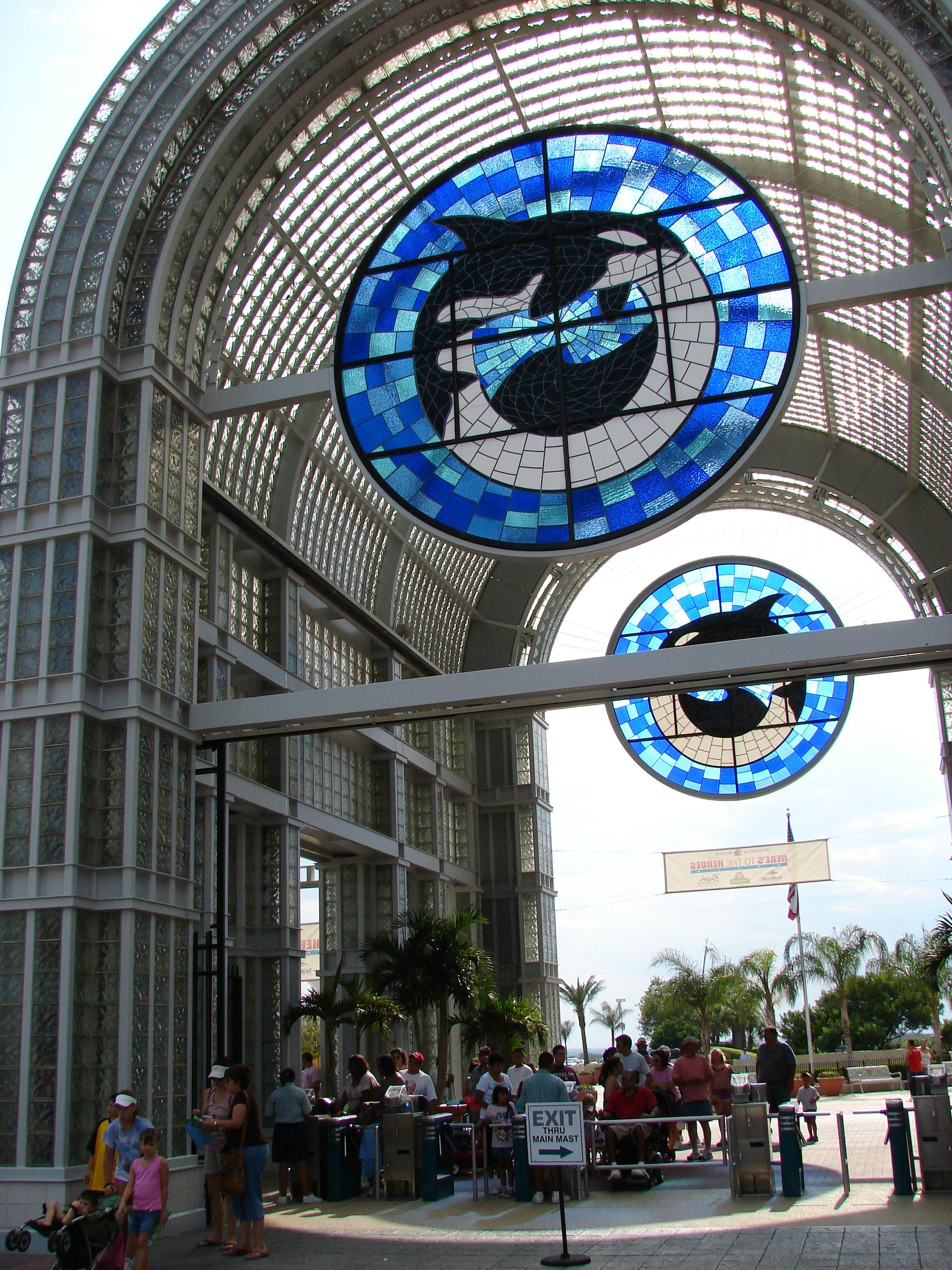
SeaWorld San Antonio

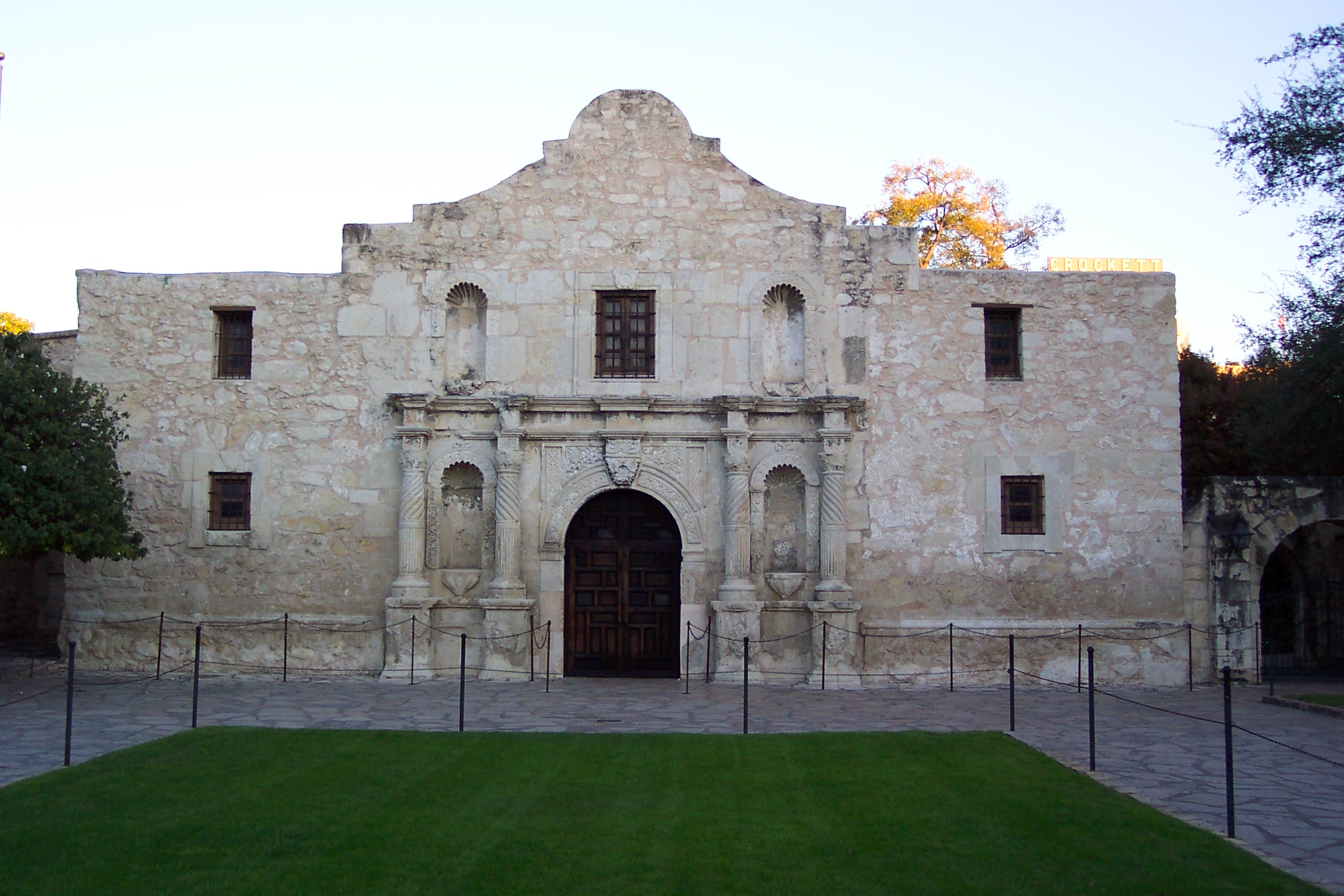
The Alamo

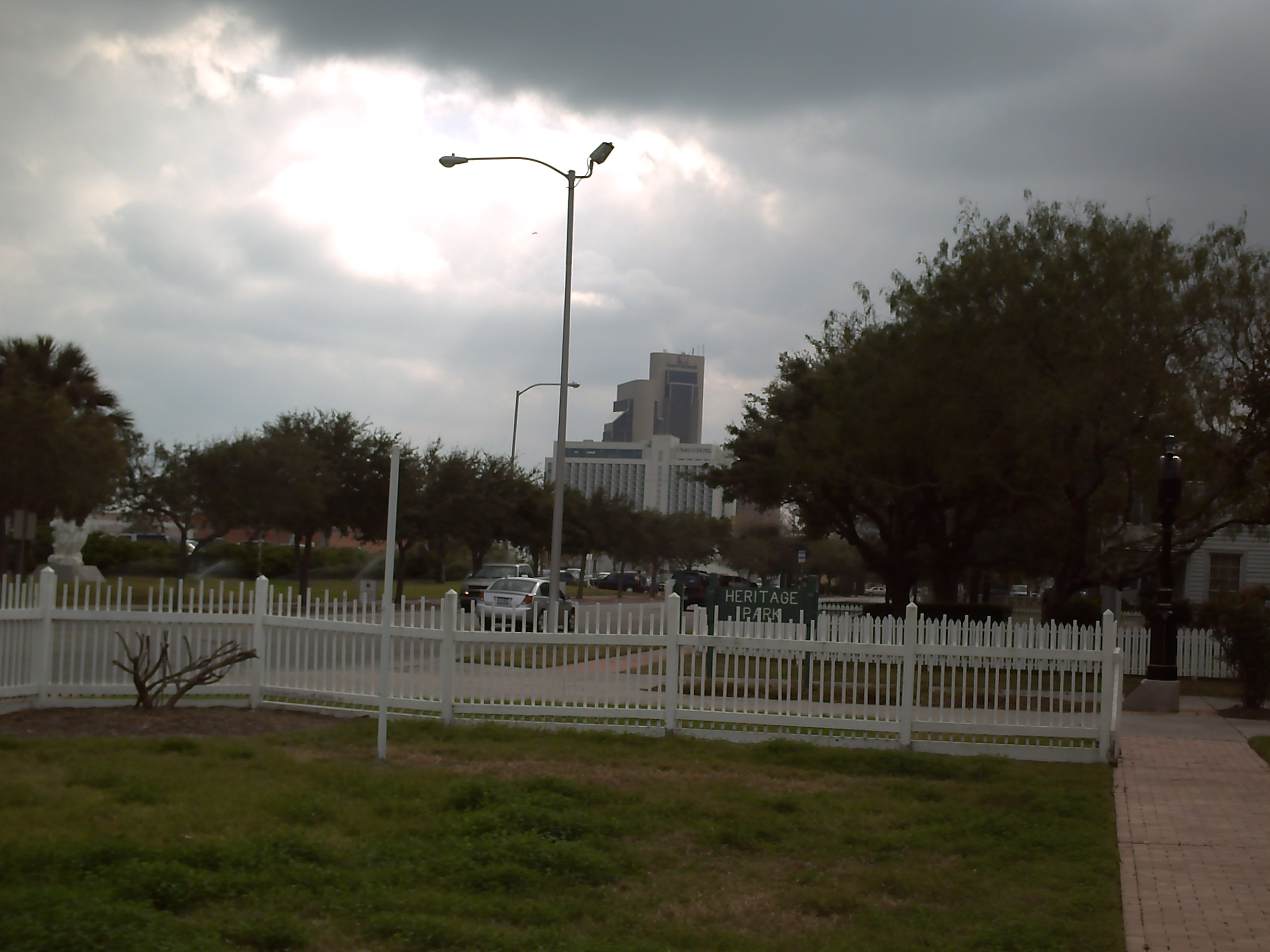
Corpus Christi

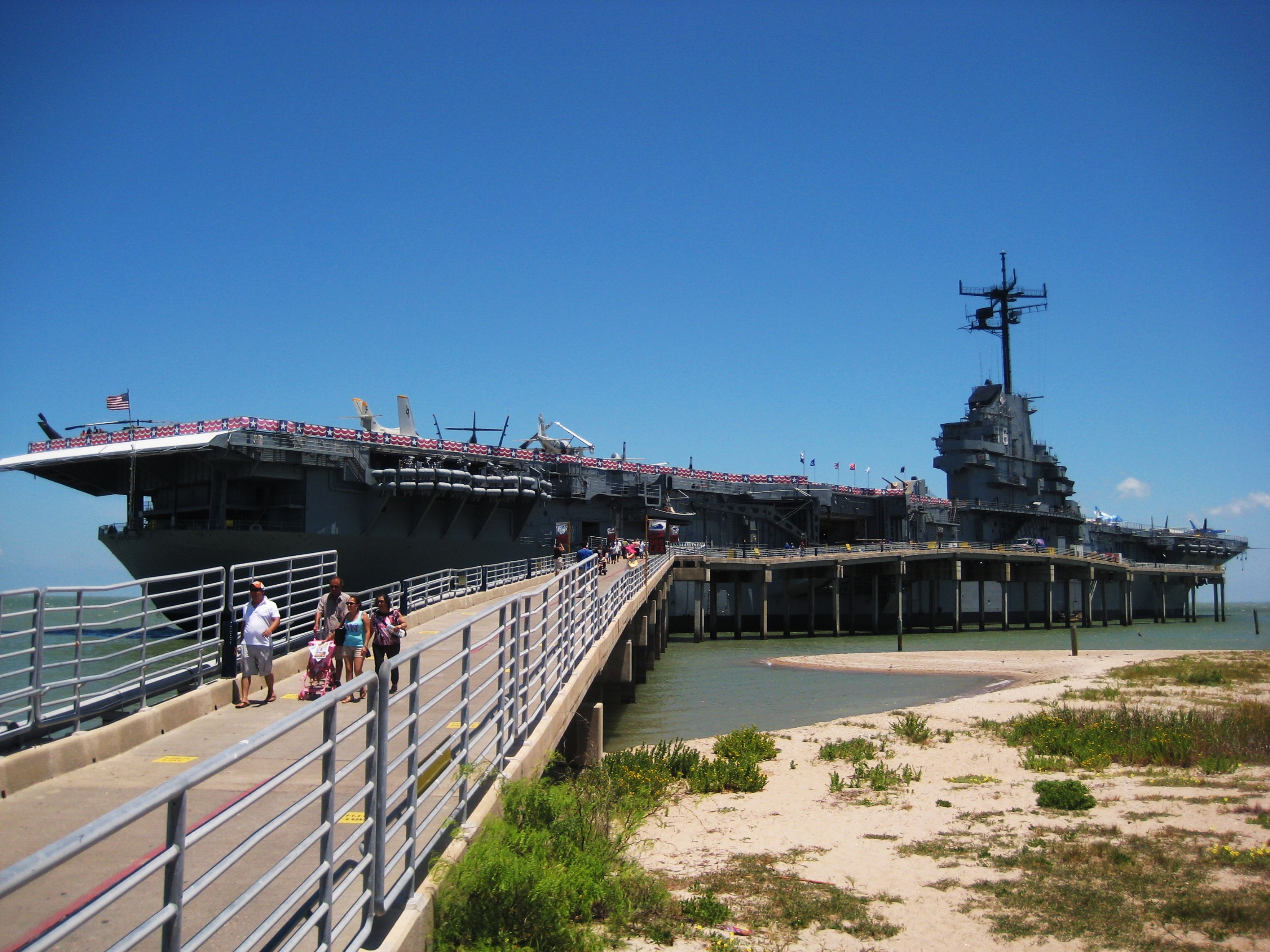
USS Lexington floating museum in Corpus Christi

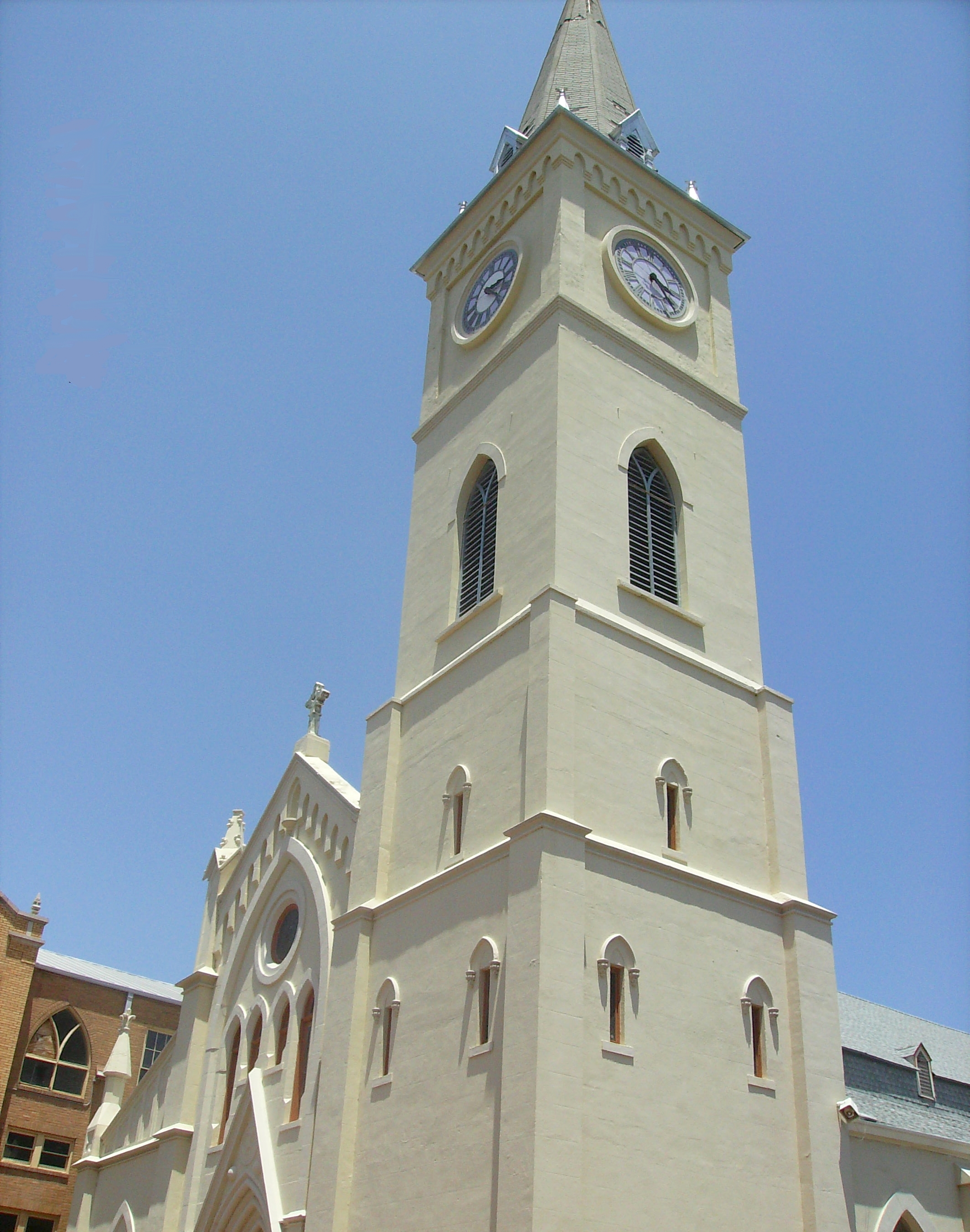
San Agustin Cathedral in Laredo's San Agustin de Laredo Historic District

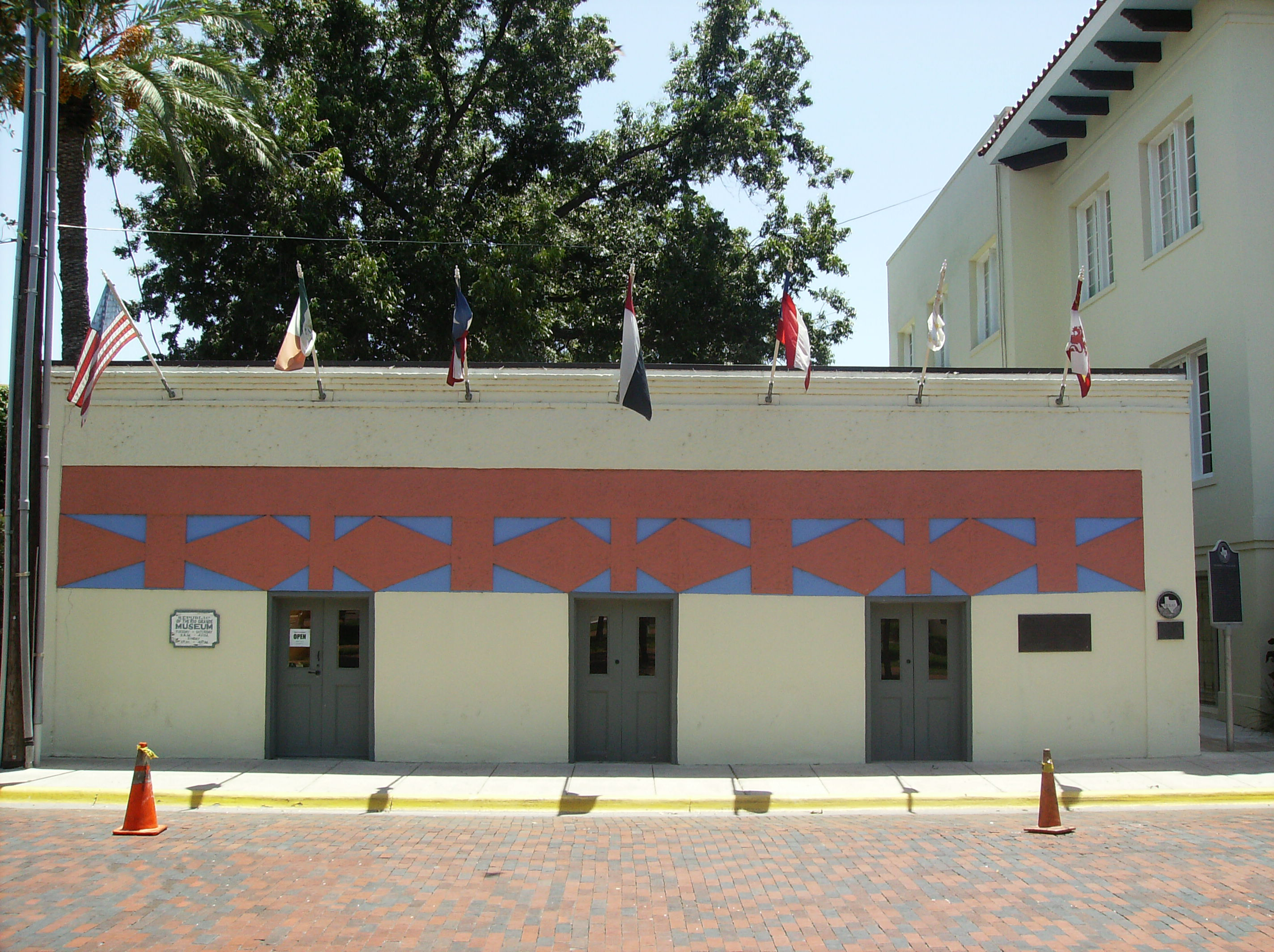
Republic of the Rio Grande Capitol building in Laredo

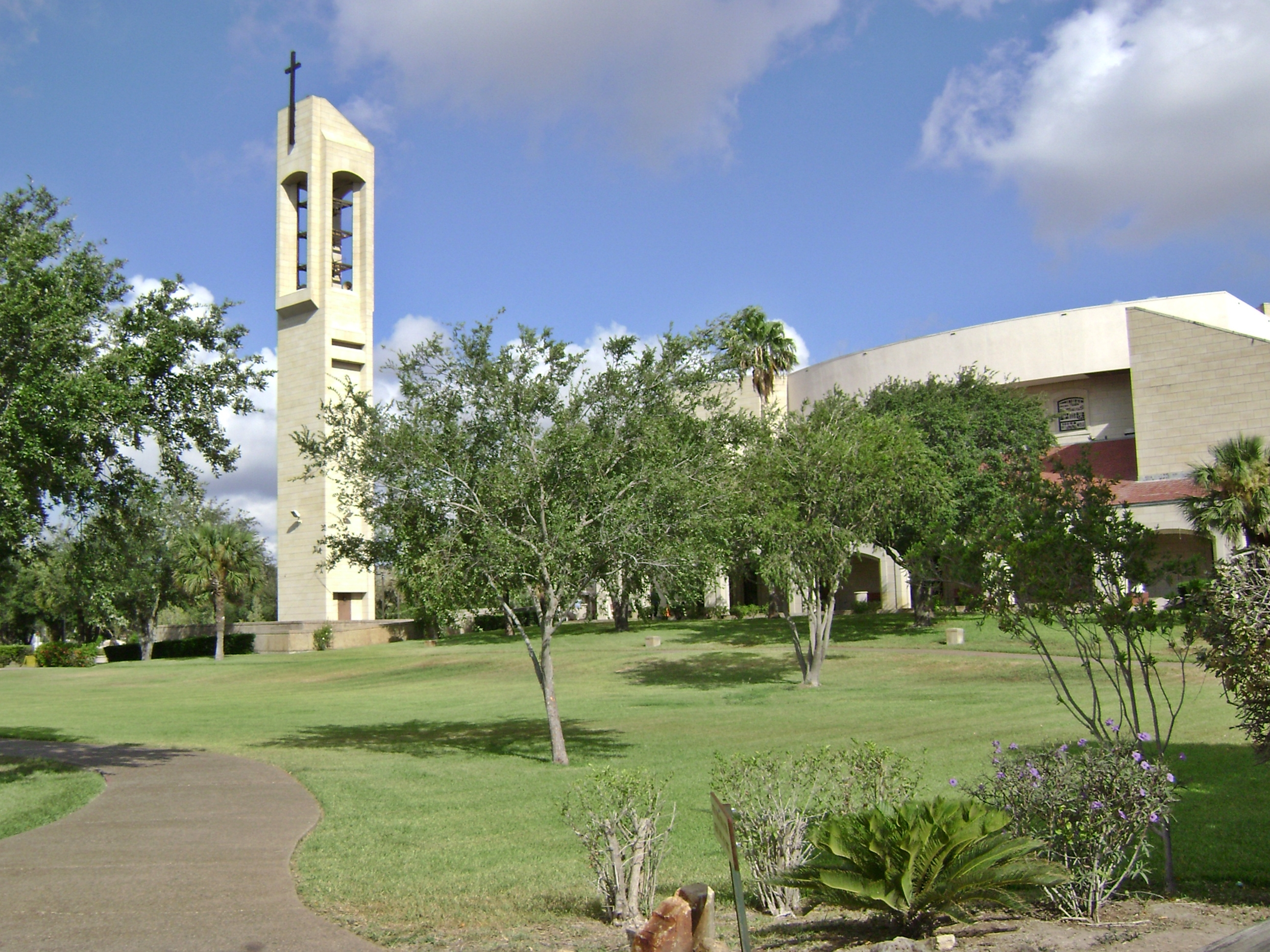
Basilica of San Juan del Valle in San Juan

== Education ==
=== Colleges ===
- Alamo Community College District
  - San Antonio College
  - Palo Alto College
  - St. Philip's College
  - Northeast Lakeview College
  - Northwest Vista College
- Coastal Bend College
  - Alice Campus
  - Main Campus (Beeville)
  - Kingsville Campus
  - Pleasanton Campus
- Del Mar College
- Laredo Community College
  - Laredo Community College South Campus
- South Texas College
  - Main Campus, McAllen
  - Tech Campus, McAllen
  - Nursing and Allied Health Campus, McAllen
  - Mid-Valley Campus, Weslaco
  - Starr County Campus, Rio Grande City
- Texas State Technical College
- Texas Southmost College

==== Public universities ====
- Texas A&M International University (Laredo)
- Texas A&M University–Corpus Christi
- Texas A&M University–Kingsville (Texas A&I)
- Texas A&M University–San Antonio
- Texas A&M University–Victoria
- University of Texas Health Science Center at San Antonio
- University of Texas at San Antonio
- University of Texas Rio Grande Valley (2015)
  - University of Texas at Brownsville
  - University of Texas–Pan American

==== Private universities ====
- Our Lady of the Lake University
- St. Mary's University
- University of the Incarnate Word
- Trinity University
- Texas Lutheran University

== Sports ==
The only major professional sports team in South Texas is the San Antonio Spurs in the NBA.

Team	Sport	League	Venue
San Antonio Spurs	Basketball	NBA	AT&T Center
Rio Grande Valley Vipers	Basketball	NBA G League	Bert Ogden Arena
San Antonio Talons	Arena football	AFL	Alamodome
Corpus Christi Hammerheads	Arena football	Lone Star Football League	American Bank Center
Corpus Christi Hooks	Baseball	Texas League	Whataburger Field
San Antonio Missions	Baseball	Texas League	Nelson W. Wolff Municipal Stadium
Laredo Lemurs	Baseball	AAIPB	Uni-Trade Stadium
Brownsville Charros	Baseball	United League Baseball	Harlingen Field
Rio Grande Valley WhiteWings	Baseball	United League Baseball	Harlingen Field
San Antonio Rampage	Ice hockey	American Hockey League	AT&T Center
Corpus Christi IceRays	Ice hockey	North American Hockey League	American Bank Center
San Antonio FC	Soccer	USL Championship	Toyota Field
Laredo Heat	Soccer	PDL	TAMIU Soccer Complex
La Fiera FC	Indoor soccer	PASL	State Farm Arena

== Area codes ==
- 210 - San Antonio, Bexar County
- 361 - Corpus Christi, Alice, Victoria, Kingsville, Rockport, Falfurrias
- 726 - San Antonio metropolitan area
- 830 - Eagle Pass, Floresville
- 956 - Laredo, Brownsville, McAllen, Mission, Edinburg
- 979 - only the southern half of this area is in South Texas

== See also ==
- List of geographical regions in Texas
- List of Texas regions
- Port of Corpus Christi
- Republic of the Rio Grande
- Tejano South Texas
