= Bayfest =

Bayfest may refer to the following annual music festivals:

- Bayfest (Corpus Christi), Texas
- Bayfest (Mobile), Alabama
- Sarnia Bayfest or Rogers Bayfest, Sarnia, Ontario
