= Nueces Bay =

Bay in Texas, United States

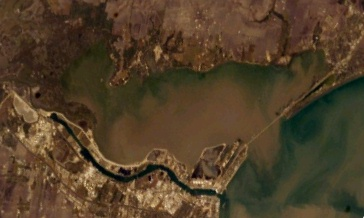
- Nueces Bay from Space

- Location within Texas
- Location: South Texas Gulf Coast
- Coordinates: 27°51′02″N 97°25′58″W
- River sources: Nueces River
- Ocean/sea sources: Gulf of Mexico
- Basin countries: United States
- Settlements: Corpus Christi, Portland

Nueces Bay is a northwestern extension of Corpus Christi Bay in the San Patricio and Nueces Counties of Texas. The bay is fed by the Nueces River, forming a natural estuary, which renders it ecologically and economically vital to the surrounding area. It serves as a habitat for the propagation of fish and shellfish, which sustain diverse species of birds and other wildlife. The bay is threatened by pollution from the heavy industry on its southern shore, which prevents oyster farming. Petrochemical production and oil are important to the surrounding economies of the major settlements of Corpus Christi and Portland, found on the eastern shore and connected by the Nueces Bay Causeway at the bay's confluence with Corpus Christi Bay.

Agriculture dominates the northern shore, where many plots of land are still owned by the descendants of early settlers. The largely abandoned historical communities of Rosita and West Portland are also located in this area. To the west, the Odem Bay extension is formed, and is fed by Rincon Bayou and a large complex of marsh formed by the Nueces River delta. Just south of the mouth are the remains of the abandoned Nuecestown settlement, which is now included in the Corpus Christi city limits.

== History ==
Nueces Bay formed around 9,000 years ago, as the sea level rose at the conclusion of the last ice age. The sea level stabilized 6,000 years later, shaping the present-day Nueces Bay. The first human inhabitants were the nomadic Aransas Indians, who settled between the Copano and Baffin Bays about 8,000 years ago, until 1300 CE. In the next century, the Karankawa Indians arrived, and were present when Europeans came ashore.

Nueces is Spanish for "nuts", and refers to the pecan trees that grew along the banks of the Nueces River, noted by Spanish explorer Alonso De León in 1689. It is unclear when the name was given to the bay; it was called San Miguel Arcángel by Spanish captain Joaquín de Orobio y Basterra in 1747, and an 1835 map of Texas identified it as Papelote or "wastepaper" Bay. It appears to have been first noted on a Spanish map in 1527 as the mouth of the Río Escondido or hidden river, which is believed to be the Nueces. French explorer René Robert Cavelier, Sieur de La Salle sailed into the bay in 1685, mistakenly believing it was the Mississippi River. Spanish colonial governor José de Escandón planned a villa on the mouth of the Nueces River named Villa de Vedoya. About 50 families were sent to the site in 1749, but they failed to establish a settlement due to a lack of sufficient supplies. Later that century, missionaries discussed the possibility of moving Nuestra Señora del Refugio Mission to the site, but decided against the idea due to conflict with the Lipan Apaches. Germans attempted to settle the same area, but were turned away by the French during the Pastry War in the 1830s. The next decade, a colony for freed slaves was proposed by abolitionist Benjamin Lundy, who had to cancel after the outbreak of the Texas Revolution.

Corpus Christi, which was founded as a trading post on the southeastern shore in 1839, is believed to be the first permanent settlement on the bay. It soon grew into a major Texas port with a population of 277,454 at the time of the 2000 census. In 1852, a settlement was finally established at the confluence of the Nueces River and Nueces Bay by Henry Kinney, who also founded Corpus Christi. The community was referred to as "the Motts" by German and English settlers for nearby tree clusters, but was officially known as Nuecestown. It was raided by Mexican bandits in 1875, but recovered and grew to a population of 200 by 1896. After the railroad passed on the town in 1905, it declined, and is today included in the city limits of Corpus Christi. To the north of the bay, the Coleman-Fulton Pasture Company controlled a large segment of San Patricio County for ranching during the aftermath of the Texas Revolution. David Sinton and later Charles Phelps Taft, whose names are immortalized by the nearby towns of Sinton and Taft, were involved with the company. They sold a plot of land on the northeast of Nueces Bay to George H. Paul, who hired Mexican immigrants to clear the land of mesquite trees and founded a ranching community later named West Portland. The plots of land in this community are still mostly held by the descendants of the original owners. The town of Portland—on the extreme northeast of the bay—was also established from land purchased from the Coleman-Fulton Pasture Company by future State Senator John G. Willacy with help from a New England company. The town steadily grew and reached a population of 14,827 by 2000. To the northwest of the bay, on the Whites Point peninsula, a settlement was established around 1866 by cattledriver Darius Rachal, who had purchased land on the point from the cattle-driving White family. Soon after his purchase, many of the Whites died of yellow fever as an epidemic swept the area and killed 14 people. Rachal used his land to raise cattle, grow cotton, and sell real estate to new settlers. A post office was established at the site in 1892, and was given the name Rosita or "little flower" after the names "White Point" and "Rachal" were rejected by United States Postal Service. After a 1915 gas explosion and two massive hurricanes, including a 1919 storm that killed 26 residents (about 50 were killed in Portland and 47 in Corpus Christi), the post office was closed in 1919, and by the next year, most residents had relocated to Odem.

== Features ==
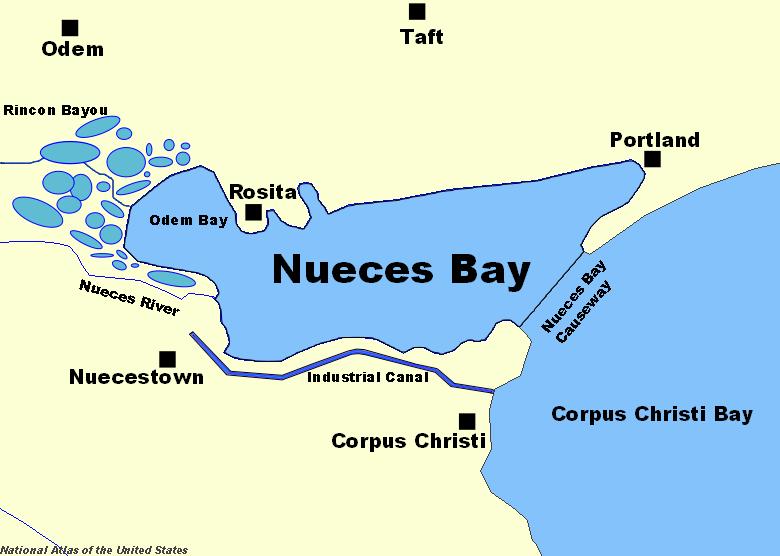
Map of Nueces Bay

Nueces Bay covers an area of 28.9 square miles (75 km^{2}) and drains the 16,950 square miles (43,900 km^{2}) of the Nueces River basin. It has an average depth of 2.3 ft, and a volume of 39,700 acre-feet (49,000,000 m^{3}). The bay is considered the southern extreme of the Texas Coastal Plain, which stretches northeast to Galveston Bay, and is part of the geographic transition from the grasslands of the coastal plain to the dry brush region of South Texas. It forms at the base of the Nueces River, which enters at the southwesternmost point of the bay. North of the Nueces entrance is the extension of Odem Bay, named for the nearby settlement of Odem. This extension includes shallow marsh fed by an extensive system of tidal streams including Rincon Bayou, and is headed by Whites Point to the east. Due south of Whites Point at the mouth of Odem Bay, is an oil field, situated against the backdrop of heavy industry on the shore to the southwest. The southern shore, which continues toward Rincon Point, is slender due to the industrial canal dredged to the south to the Port of Corpus Christi. The mouth of Nueces Bay on Corpus Christi Bay from Rincon Point to Indian Point, is crossed by the mile-long (1.6 km) Nueces Bay Causeway, which leads to Portland. West Portland is found on the shoreline of the bay as it curves north and west, which is lined with piers and residences. The bay leads back west to Whites Point on the north shore, which is largely used for agriculture.

== Ecosystem ==
The Nueces estuary provides an ecosystem for a wide variety of wildlife. However, since the construction of Choke Canyon Reservoir in 1985, freshwater inflows have decreased from the Nueces River, increasing the bay's salinity, and hurting the natural oyster and shrimp habitat. In response, the City of Corpus Christi, Texas Parks and Wildlife Department and two additional state agencies have worked to restore the natural freshwater inflows into the bay. The Odem Bay extension is low in salinity and serves as a nursery for shrimp, which migrate to Nueces Bay in spring. Oyster beds are common throughout the bay and are known to be hiding spots for such fish as trout, black drum, flounder, and redfish. Such finfish must be protected from excessive freshwater introduction for survival.

A diverse collection of birds sustained by the water life, such as the black skimmer, brown pelican, great blue heron, egret, laughing gull, roseate spoonbill, tern, and white ibis, can be found in the bay, especially near the mouth of Rincon Bayou. Local efforts by the Coastal Bend Bays and Estuaries program have benefited bird populations by adding crushed oyster shells to the bay's small islands for improved nesting conditions, and the restoration of marsh near the Nueces Bay Causeway to increase fish populations to satisfy the birds' dietary requirements. At the nearby Nueces Delta Preserve, countless birds have been observed, as well as bobcats, coyotes, feral hogs, mountain lions, rattlesnakes, Texas spiny lizards, western diamondbacks, and white-tailed deer.

== Industry ==
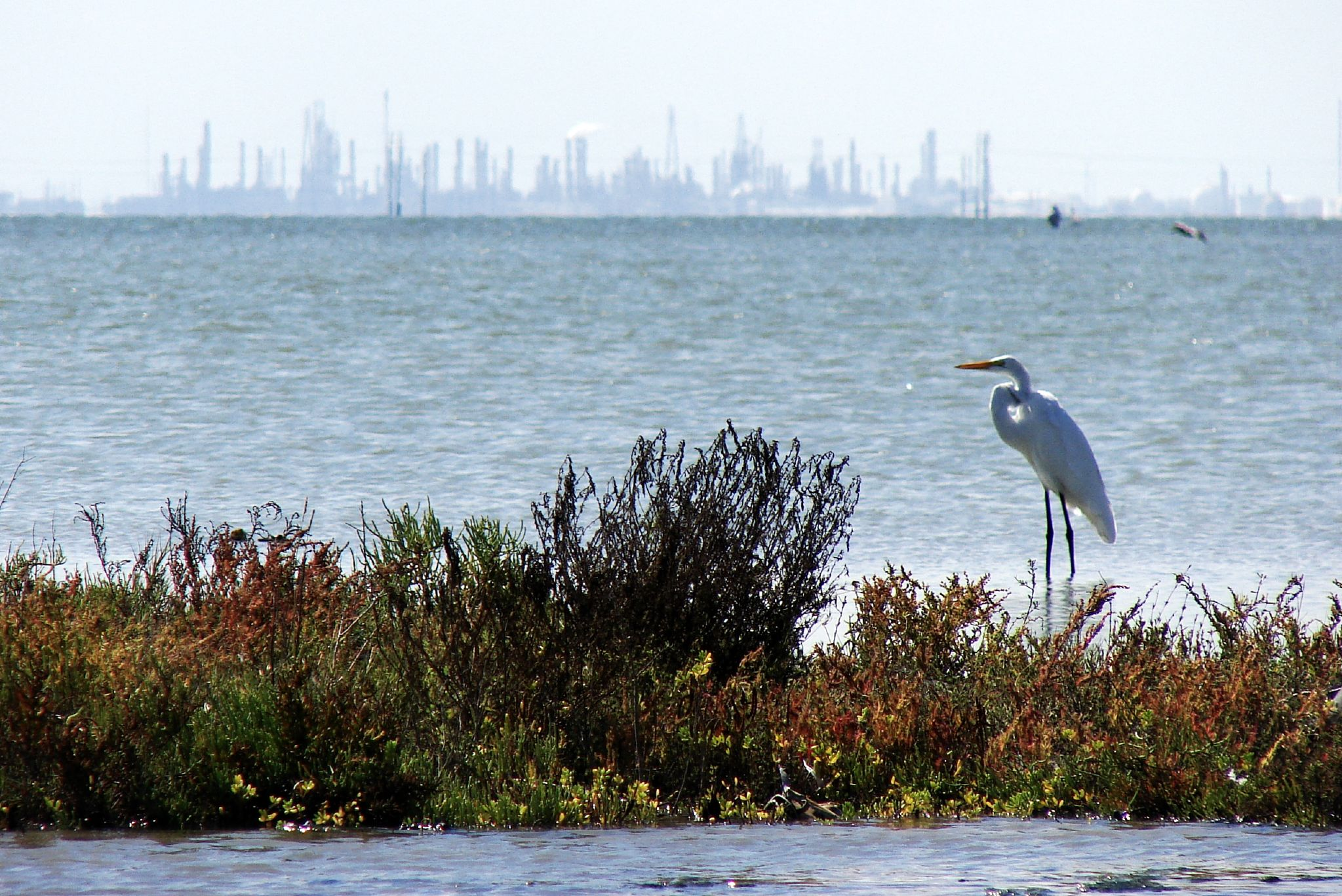
A great egret wades on the waters of Nueces Bay, with industry on the horizon.

Oil has been pumped from the bay since 1912, but fishing has been a mainstay since humans have inhabited the area. In the early 1970s, recreational fishing accounted for a yearly input of $17 million to the local economy, while commercial fishermen contributed $27.3 million. Commercial oyster farming was common in the bay until 1995, when the Texas Department of State Health Services suspended the practice, due to an unhealthy annual average zinc level of nearly 2500 mg/kg in oysters, which as filter feeders, are affected by high levels of zinc in the water. The excessive zinc is believed to have been dumped into the bay by the American Smelting and Refining Company's Encycle Texas Incorporated subsidiary, which operated a zinc refinery at the site from 1942 to 1985. The Nueces Bay Power Station is also believed to have discharged zinc used for coolant until December 2002. Since that time, zinc levels in the bay have been reduced to slightly under 1000 mg/kg, which remains above the healthy levels of 700 mg/kg. The power station has since come under the control of the Topaz Power Group. The Texas Commission on Environmental Quality has established the Total Maximum Daily Load Program to measure the level of pollutants throughout the Nueces watershed, in an effort to restore the bay to safe levels of contaminants. Pesticides that seep into the bay from the heavy agricultural activity on the north shore can also spur adverse environmental effects.

Several oil spills have occurred as a result of the heavy petroleum industry on the south shore of Nueces Bay. In 1984, about 20,000 US gal (76,000 L) of oil leaked from a broken pipeline, which blackened 5 miles (8.0 km) of the shore. Ten years later, Koch Industries, which owns a refinery on the bay, was responsible for a major spill that resulted in the release of 100,000 US gal (380,000 L) of oil, leaving a 12-mile (19 km) slick that seeped into Corpus Christi Bay. The Environmental Protection Agency fined the company $30 million for the spill in 2000, and $2.5 million were later given by the company to the state of Texas to improve the bay's water quality.
