= Rincon Bayou =

Location
- Country: United States
- State: Texas
- County: Nueces County

Physical characteristics
- Mouth
  - location: Nueces Bay
  - coordinates: 27.871°N 97.516°W

Rincon Bayou is in the Nueces River delta, and located northwest of Corpus Christi. The Rincon Bayou is subject to freshwater inundation following seasonal rainfall events farther inland along the Nueces River. The freshwater inundation provides the bayou with nutrients and enough fresh water to remove the saline water from the estuarine system. In 1984, though, the United States Bureau of Reclamation built a dam along the Frio River to create Choke Canyon Reservoir, which has consequently caused a decrease in freshwater flow into the Rincon Bayou. This decrease has affected the wetland plant and macroinvertebrate communities. The hypersaline condition makes it difficult for plants to produce seeds and for the seeds to germinate. As part of an effort for the Rincon Bayou–Nueces Marsh Wetlands Restoration and Enhancement Project, the Bureau of Reclamation has created a channel between the Nueces River and the Rincon Bayou. It is located just east of US 77 and extends 900 ft to the bayou. The purpose of the channel is to increase the freshwater inflow into the bayou. A second channel was cut within the bayou in an effort to increase the freshwater flow to an area dominated by sand and mud flats. The increase in freshwater flow should help re-establish the vegetative community.

== See also ==
- List of rivers of Texas
