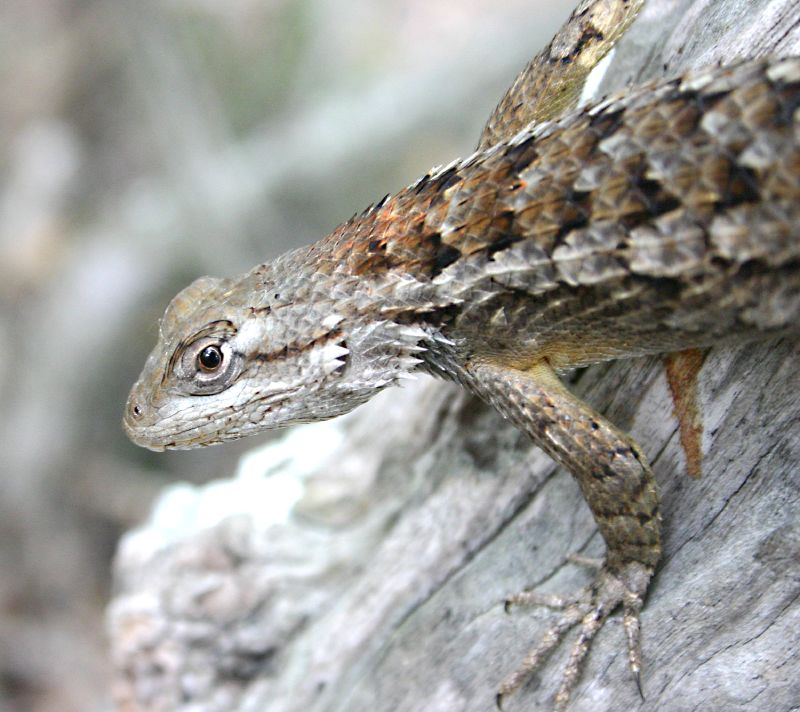

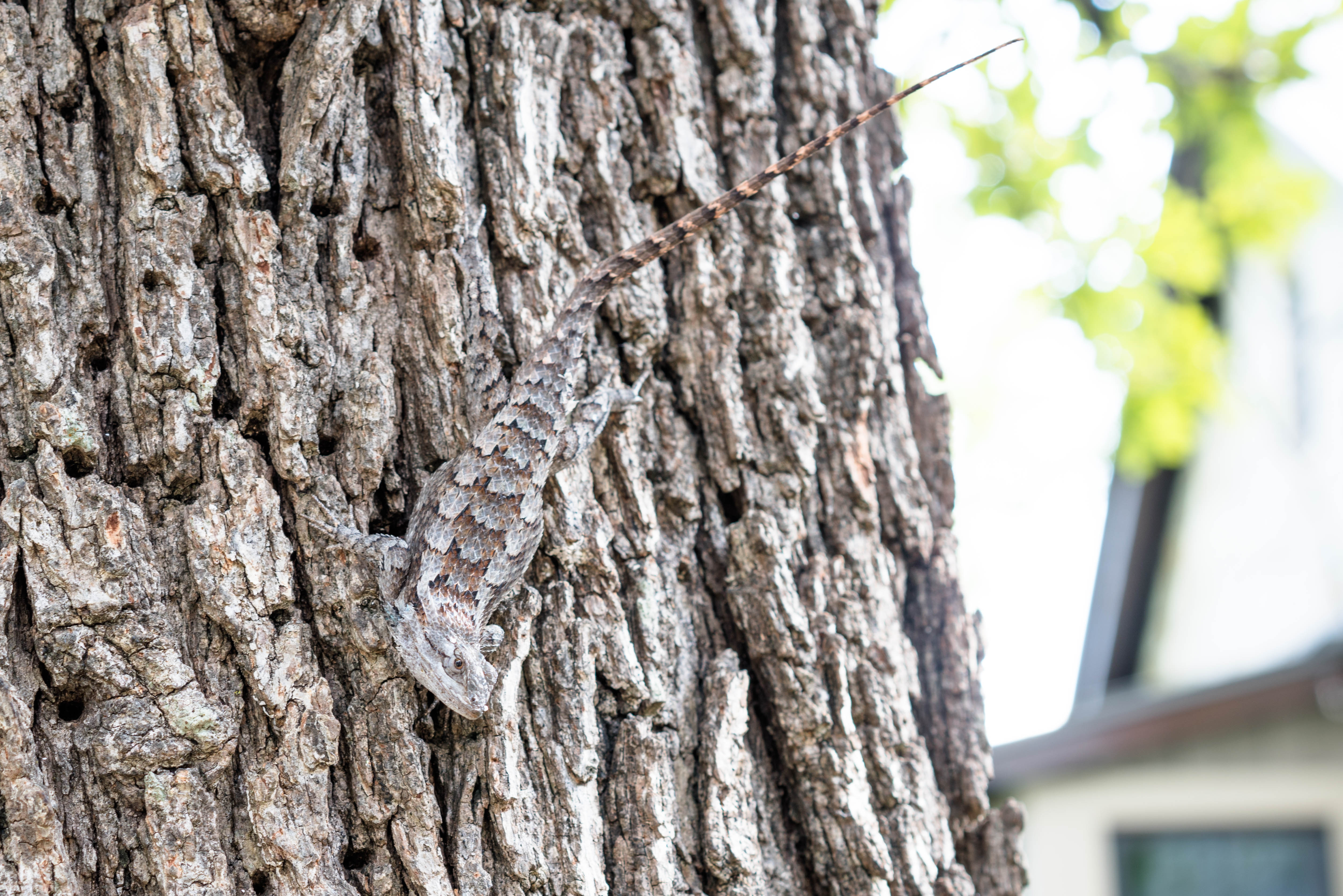
- Sceloporus olivaceus in Texas

Conservation status
- Least Concern (IUCN 3.1)

Scientific classification
- Kingdom: Animalia
- Phylum: Chordata
- Class: Reptilia
- Order: Squamata
- Suborder: Iguania
- Family: Phrynosomatidae
- Genus: Sceloporus
- Species: S. olivaceus

Binomial name
- Sceloporus olivaceus H.M. Smith, 1934

= Texas spiny lizard =

Species of lizard

The Texas spiny lizard (Sceloporus olivaceus) is a species of phrynosomatid lizard native to the south central United States, in the states of Texas, Arizona and Oklahoma, and northeastern Mexico in the states of Coahuila, Nuevo León, Tamaulipas, and San Luis Potosí. They are quite common throughout their range, where they can be found in trees or on fences.

== Description ==
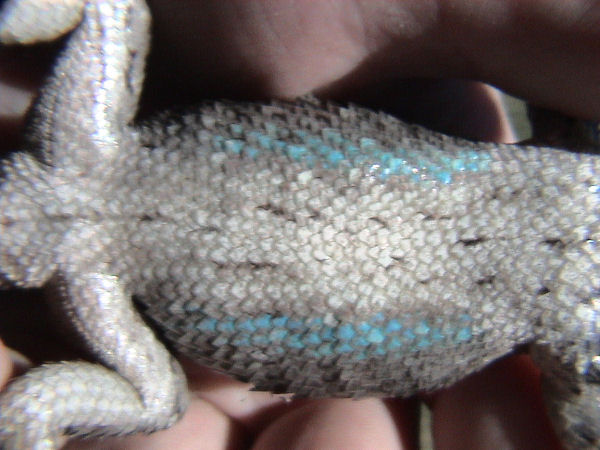
Belly of male, showing blue color

Adults are 7.5–11 in (19–28 cm) in total length, and are typically grey in color with black, white, or red-brown blotching down the back. Patterns vary greatly by locality, but the colors and pattern typically serve to be adequate camouflage against the bark of trees in its chosen habitat. The underside is usually uniformly light grey in color, but males typically have blue patches on either side of the belly. Adult males are also larger on average. The lizards' scales have a distinctly spiny texture to them. They have long toes, and sharp claws suited to climbing.

== Reproduction ==
The Texas spiny lizard will breed throughout the summer months of the year, and is capable of laying four clutches each year if nutrients are plentiful. Each clutch will contain 2 to 20 eggs at a time.

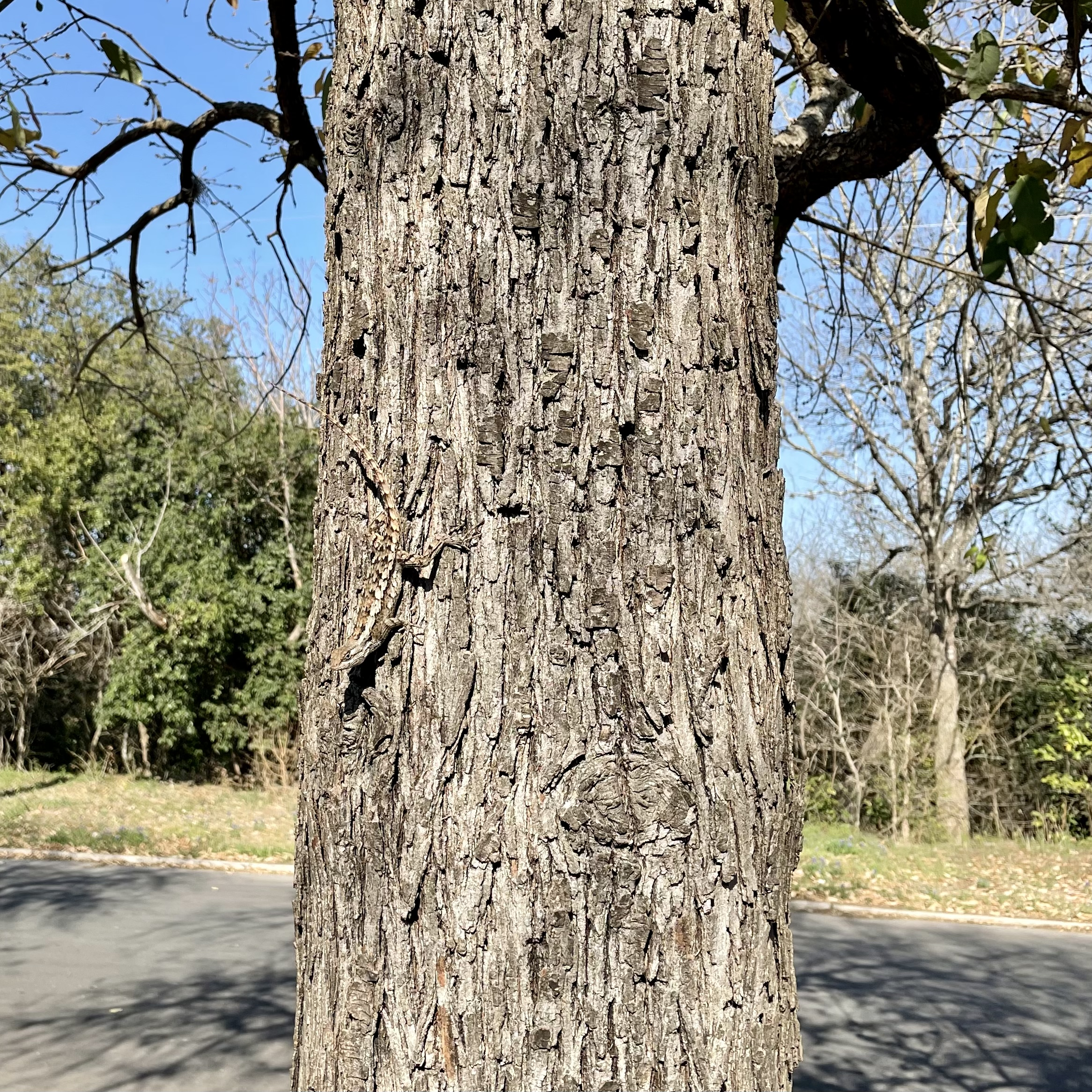
Texas Spiny Lizard camouflaged on a Mexican White Oak tree.

== Behavior ==
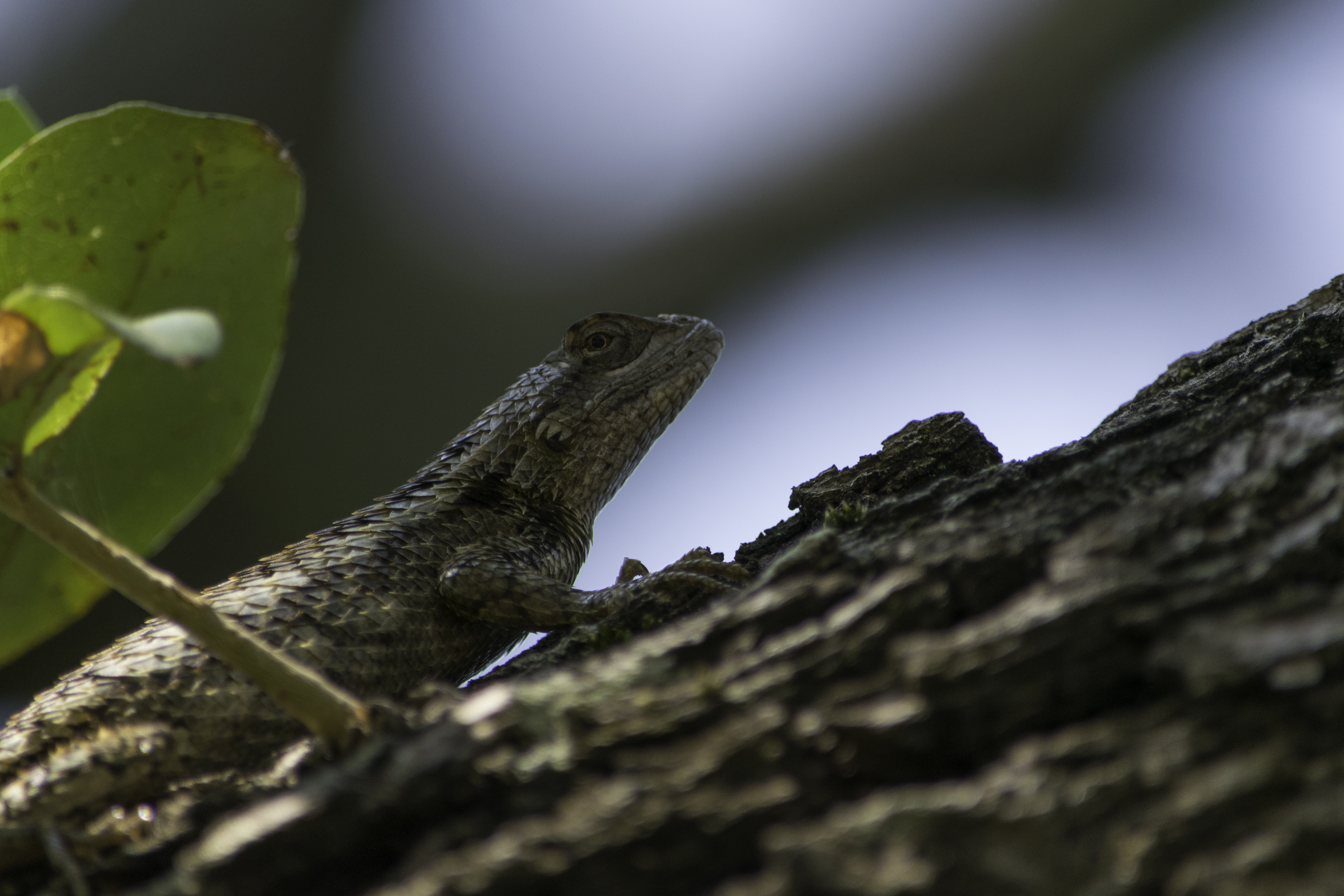
Keeping a watchful eye

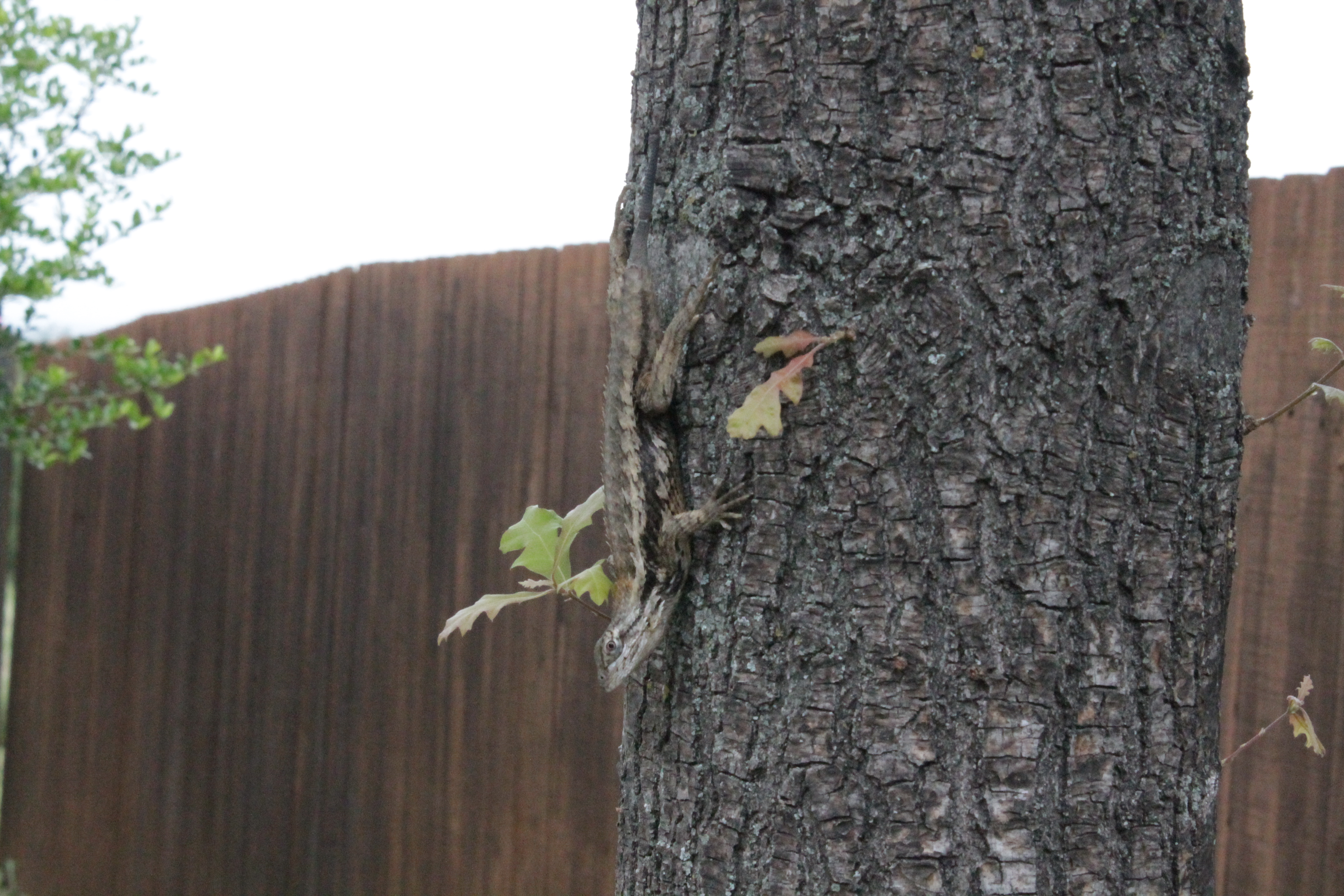
A Texas spiny lizard using a red oak tree for camouflage

The Texas spiny lizard is diurnal and arboreal. Their preferred habitat is mesquite or oak trees and areas with a significant amount of ground leaf litter. They are often found in suburban areas basking on fences or climbing telephone poles.

Typically shy and nervous, when approached they will usually retreat up a tree or flee noisily through leaf litter on the ground. They are insectivorous, and eat a variety of beetles, grasshoppers, wasps and other insects. Predators of the Texas spiny lizard include hawks, roadrunners, snakes, and outdoor house cats, but the lizard uses its camouflaged body to avoid detection.

To establish dominance for mating territory, male lizards may perform "push-up" displays when they observe each other, whereby they bob the anterior of their body up and down. Males may also compete physically if these visual displays are not enough to deter competitors.

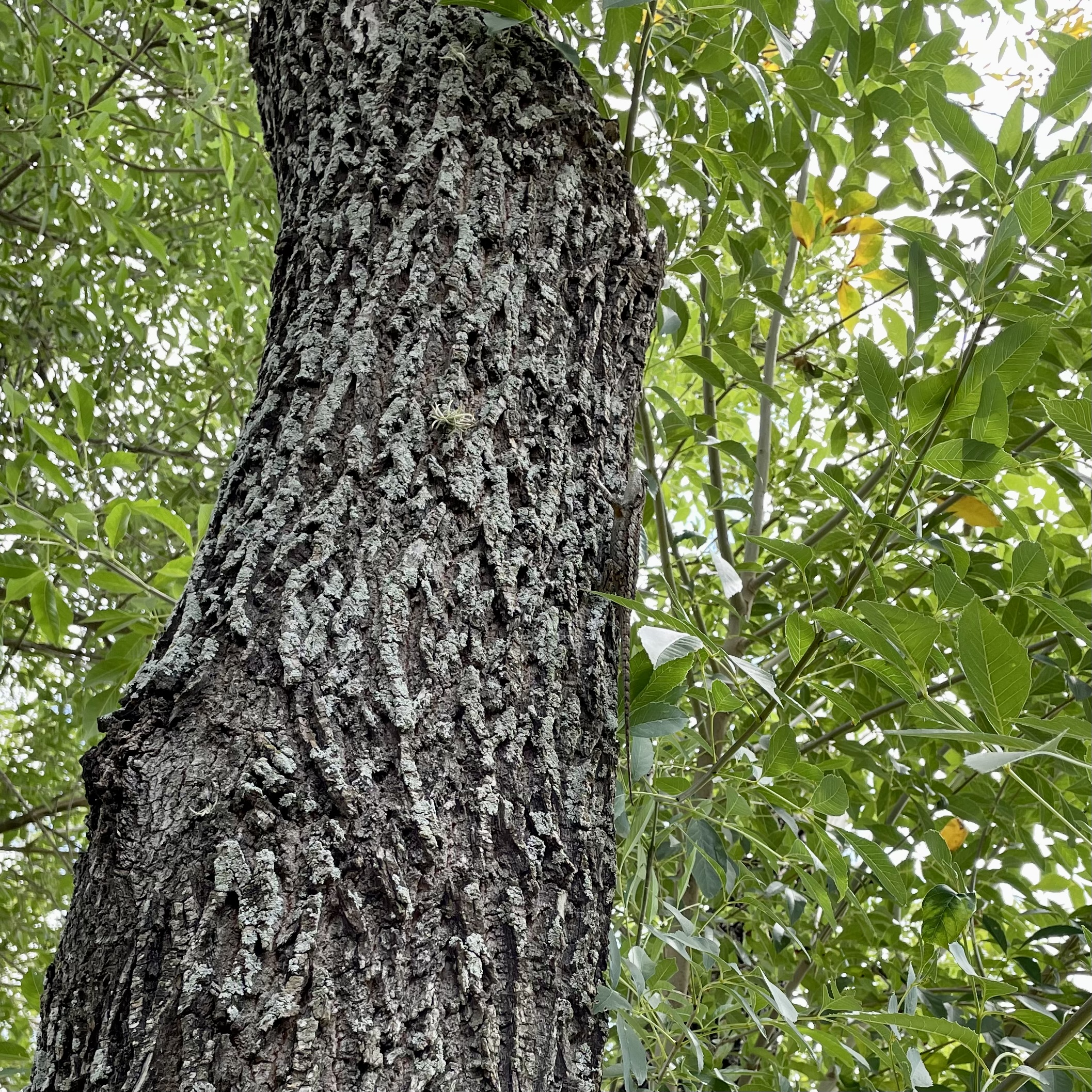
Texas Spiny Lizard camouflaged on an ash tree.
