= Bayfest (Corpus Christi) =

American music festival

Coordinates: 27.8085°N 97.3943°W

- Genre: Music
- Dates: Late September; three days
- Locations: Corpus Christi, Texas, US
- Years active: 1976–2010

Bayfest was a three-day music festival in Corpus Christi, Texas held annually from 1976 to 2010.

== History ==
In 1976, the Arts Council of Corpus Christi and the Junior League of Corpus Christi co-sponsored the first Bayfest. Bayfest celebrated the unique cultural and ethnic diversity of Corpus Christi through music, art, entertainment and rides.

It was run by community volunteers and Bayfest, Inc. was a non-profit organisation. Low turnout and revenue 2010 brought it to an end.
