= Annaville, Corpus Christi, Texas =

Neighborhood of Corpus Christi

Annaville is a suburban neighborhood in Corpus Christi, Texas, United States. It is a town on the outskirts of Corpus Christi established by Leo and Anna Stewart in 1940, before being annexed by Corpus Christi in the mid-1960s. Annaville borders the Calallen district of Corpus Christi.

== Education ==
Annaville is served by the Tuloso-Midway Independent School District, and high school students attend Tuloso-Midway High School.
