= Clarkwood, Corpus Christi, Texas =

Area of Corpus Christi, Texas, US

Coordinates: 27.7848°N 97.5353°W

Clarkwood is an area on the west side of Corpus Christi, Texas. Clarkwood was a town before being annexed by Corpus Christi in 1962.

== Education ==
- Tuloso-Midway Independent School District
  - Tuloso-Midway High School
