= Griest =

Griest is a surname. Notable people with the surname include:

- Kristen Marie Griest, one of the first two women to graduate from the U.S. Army Ranger School
- Stephanie Griest (born 1974), Chicana author and activist from South Texas
- William Walton Griest (1858–1929), Republican member of the U.S. House of Representatives from Pennsylvania

== See also ==
- W. W. Griest Building, historic skyscraper located in the city of Lancaster, Pennsylvania
