= London High School =

London High School may refer to:

- London High School (Ohio), a public high school in London, Ohio
- London High School (Texas), a public high school south of Corpus Christi, Texas
