= FBISD =

FBISD may refer to:

- Fort Bend Independent School District, in Fort Bend County, Texas, US
- Flour Bluff Independent School District, in Corpus Christi, Texas, US
