= H. W. Tatum =

American sculptor

Hopkins Wade "Buddy" Tatum Jr. (born 1958) is a bronze sculptor from Corpus Christi, Texas. His works include El Circo Del Mar, as well as a life-sized statue of late Tejano singer Selena Quintanilla located at Mirador de la Flor. He both sculpts and casts his bronzes.
