= Parkdale Plaza =

Coordinates: 27.7276°N 97.3828°W

- Location: Corpus Christi, Texas, United States
- Opened: 1957
- Closed: 2010
- Manager: Quick and Company Commercial Realtors
- Owner: Quick & Co Realtors
- Num. of anchor tenants: 3
- Floors: 1
- Parking: 2,500est

Parkdale Plaza was a shopping mall located in Corpus Christi, Texas. It opened in 1957 and was torn down in 2010 for a redevelopment anchored by a Walmart Supercenter.

== History ==
On May 23, 1954, plans for the shopping center were announced. The original three major stores at Parkdale Plaza were JCPenney, White Stores, and H-E-B. Other major tenants included Western Auto, Piccadilly Cafeterias, Toy House, Lichenstein's and Neisner's. On March 11, 1964, Woolworth opened its first Woolco discount department store in Texas in the plaza. JCPenney closed on January 17, 1970, when it moved to Padre Staples Mall. H-E-B would close on March 8, 1975, and would reopen in April as the gift redemption headquarters for Texas Gold Stamp Center.

By 1982, Parkdale Plaza had lost Lichenstein's, Whites, H-E-B, and Woolco. Linens N' More took over the H-E-B location, and Decorators Gallery took over the White Stores located in the back. Western Auto also left the Plaza during this time, though it was replaced by AutoZone. During this time, free-standing Eckerd's and Wendy's locations were added to the Plaza

Sutherlands took over the former Woolco store around the late 1980s to early 1990s, and Weiner's moved into the former JCPenney. Cloth World was bought out by JoAnn Fabrics and closed in 1994. Decorators Gallery was shut down in 1994 as well. The Decorators Gallery building remained empty throughout the 1990s. Club Dallas took over the back side of the Plaza. In 1995, Parkdale Plaza had about 65% leased. Dollar General came to the Plaza in 1999.

Entering 2000, the Plaza had no more than 45% of spaces being leased. Weiner's filed for bankruptcy in 1999 and caused the Parkdale Plaza store to shutter in June 2001. Rehoboth Joy Dollar took over the Weiner's space in 2001. Eckerds sold to CVS Pharmacy and closed the Parkdale Plaza location, which became Guitar Center in 2002.

=== Purchase in 2005 ===
In 2005, an investor from Austin bought Parkdale Plaza. On January 1, 2006, Crystal's, Joy Dollar, Linens N' More, RDA, and Armstrong McCall closed their store locations in accordance with the purchase agreement. The buyer had a vision to redevelop the Plaza into a newer shopping center. Parkdale Plaza was ready for a change. In 2009, the plaza's vacant areas suffered from a mild fire. The fire caused extensive damage to the vacant stores. The stores now could not be re-leased until new buildings were built. The largely vacant shopping center became covered in graffiti and choked with overgrown grass.

Parkdale Plaza was demolished in 2010. The City Council approved tax incentives for the prospective redevelopment based on plans to build a new Walmart Supercenter and create a shopping strip to lease out to retailers. These plans were delayed by a lawsuit brought by neighboring Sutherlands and protests over another proposed Walmart store on the city's south side. Though scheduled for completion in 2010, the store was not completed until Fall 2011 and opened on October 26, 2011.
