= Justin Storms =

American artist and musician (born 1981)

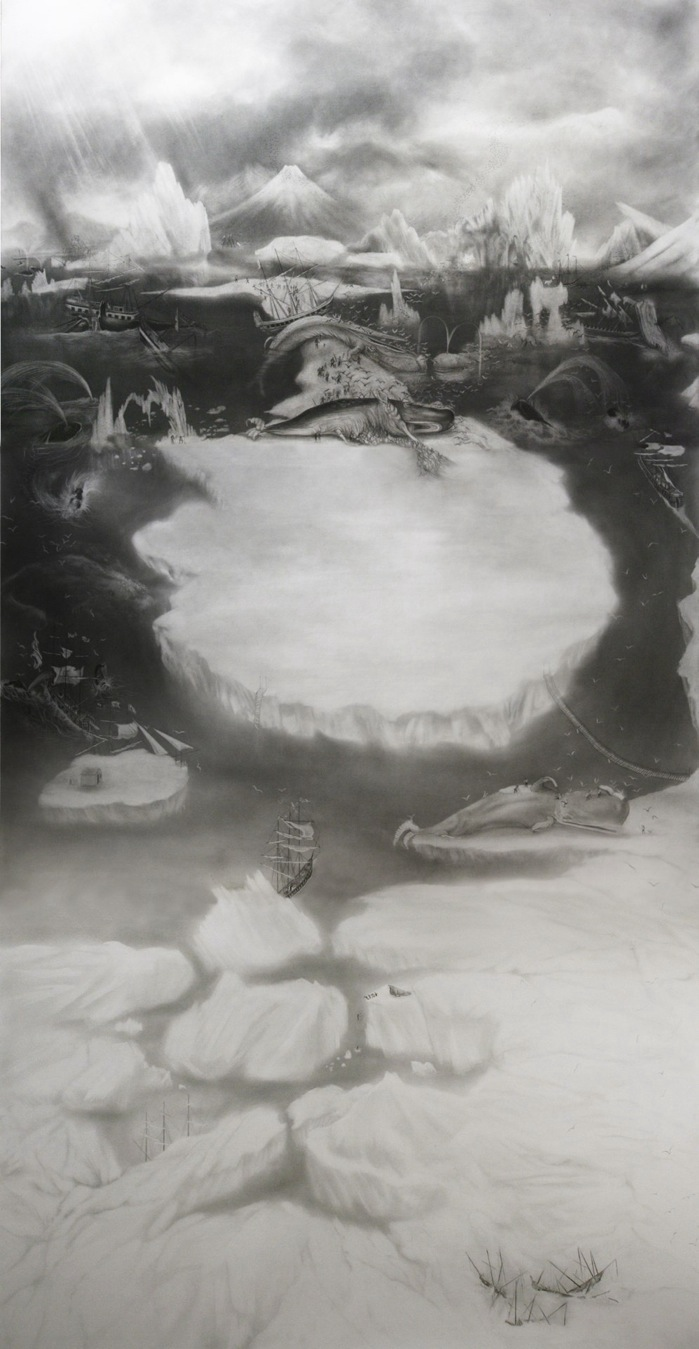
- Born: 1981 (age 44–45); Corpus Christi, Texas, United States

Justin Storms (born 1981 in Corpus Christi, Texas) is an American artist and musician.

== Art ==
Storms' work primarily revolves around a post-apocalyptic whaling Dystopia which he refers to as a "Whaletopia." Stylistically his work is airy and serene with gritty themes dealing with: overpopulation, global warming, extinction, war, death, whaling, mysticism, and maritime history. His work has been compared to Hieronymus Bosch and Géricault.

Justin Storms has exhibited in museums, art fairs, and galleries worldwide. A few being The Drawing Center, Preview Berlin, Arthouse at the Jones Center for The New American Talent 23 exhibition in Austin, Walters Art Museum, Loop Gallery in Berlin, Stolenspace Gallery in London, and Parker's Box in Brooklyn.

In 2008 Justin Storms graduated from Maryland Institute College of Art and attended the Triangle Artist Workshop in Brooklyn, NY. In 2008 he was invited to attend the University of Berlin's "Karl Hofer Gesellschaft," where he exhibited work for the emerging art fair: "Preview Berlin" which was held at the historic Berlin Tempelhof Airport. In 2009, he was awarded Switzerland's "AKKU" residency, located outside of Zurich from 2009-2010. He was commissioned to press 50 copies of the "Whaletopian Coloring Book" by AKKU. In 2010 he was invited to attend the Triangle International Residency in Brooklyn, NY.

== Music ==
Wailin Storms formed by Justin Storms in Corpus Christi, Texas, which later settled in Durham, North Carolina. The band is a mix of doom-punk and swampy rock. After two EPs – 2011's Bone Colored Moon and 2014's Shiver – the band issued their debut LP, One Foot In The Flesh Grave, on Magic Bullet Records in 2015.

Their second full-length album, Sick City, was released in 2017 and was recorded by Kevin Ratterman and Ann Gauthier at La La Land in Louisville, Kentucky, on the Polish label Antena Kryzku. Their song "Irene Garza" was featured on NPR's All Songs Considered and featured in Decibel Magazine, Cvlt Nation, Invisible Oranges, and other outlets. Their third album, Rattle, was recorded by J. Robbins and is expected to be released in the spring of 2020. The record will be released on Gilead Media in North America and Antena Kryzku in Europe.

== Press ==
Storms' work has appeared in The New Yorker, Cabinet Magazine, Baltimore City Paper, Glasstire, Art Fag City, Locus Art Magazine, and Zurich's: Tages Anzeiger Oberland.
