= Flag of Corpus Christi, Texas =

Official banner of Corpus Christi, Texas

The flag of Corpus Christi is the official banner representing the city of Corpus Christi, Texas. It consists of a seagull flying among 8 stars around it. Adopted in 1952, the flag is based on the city seal adopted the same year. It has since been named one of America's best banners, ranking 10th in the 2004 North American Vexillological Association surveys.

== History ==
The flag originated from 1952 when Corpus Christi sponsored a student contest to design a banner and seal as part of the city's centennial. Five secondary schools submitted designs as the committee who organized the event received 25 designs for a new flag. The winner was Barbara Hesse, a 17-year-old Ray High School student.Since then, the flag has been ranked 10th in the 2004 North American Vexillological Association surveys and as gained acclaim for its simple design.

== Design ==
The flag features a bay with a sea gull representing the city's people and eight stars representing major industries like agriculture, commerce, oil, chemical, metal, ore refining, sea foods and fishing, tourism, the Naval Air Station, and the Port of Corpus Christi.
