= Gardendale, Corpus Christi, Texas =

Gardendale was a community in eastern Nueces County that was annexed by the City of Corpus Christi in 1954.

== History ==
Gardendale was at a site near the western edge of present Corpus Christi in eastern Nueces County. It was established in the early 1900s and bounded roughly by South Alameda Street and the Texas Mexican Railway. At one time a school and several stores operated there.
