= South Texas Botanical Gardens & Nature Center =

Botanical garden and nature center in Corpus Christi, Texas, United States

Coordinates: 27.65261°N 97.40702°W

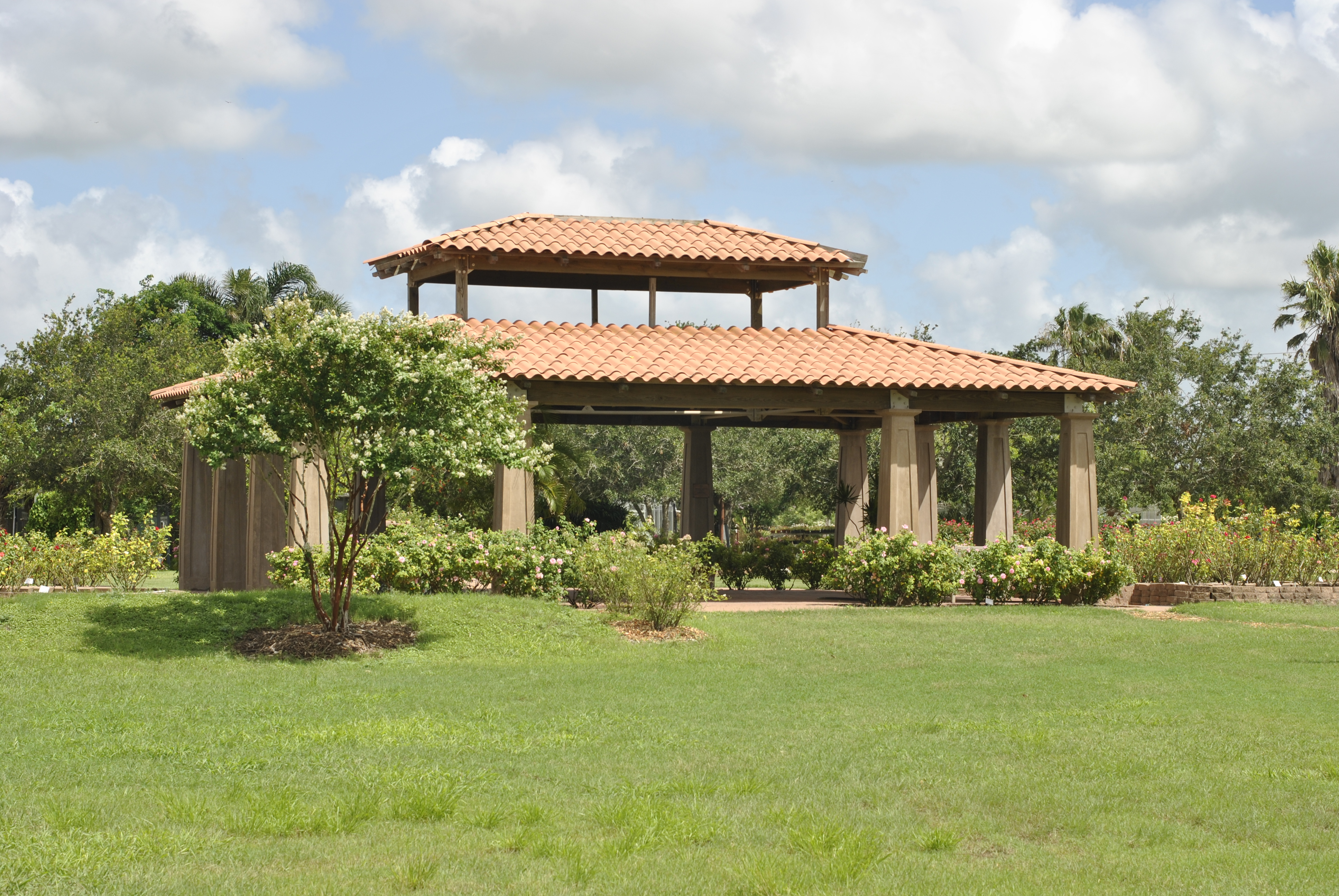
- Rose Garden Pavilion
- Interactive map of South Texas Botanical Gardens & Nature Center
- Type: Botanical gardens, Nature center
- Location: 8545 South Staples, Corpus Christi, Texas
- Area: 180 acres (73 ha)
- Website: stxbot.org

Butterfly seen in the gardens

The South Texas Botanical Gardens & Nature Center, formerly known as the Corpus Christi Botanical Gardens and Nature Center is a nonprofit, 180-acre botanical garden and nature center located at 8545 South Staples, Corpus Christi, Texas. It is open daily; an admission fee is charged.

The gardens can be traced to 1987 when a first cottage garden (1 acre) and nature trail opened in Corpus Christi. Today's gardens, however, are on a different site that opened in 1996. The gardens have been actively developed since that time.

Major exhibits now include an arid garden; Exhibit House with bromeliads, cycads, cacti, and succulents; hibiscus garden; hummingbird garden; landscape demonstration beds; orchid house with more than 3000 orchids; a major collection of more than 100 plumeria varieties; contemporary rose garden with a large pavilion; sensory garden; and water garden.

The site also contains a mesquite nature trail through 30 acres (120,000 m^{2}) of brush. It features some 35 species of woody trees and shrubs, herbs, grasses, and cacti, as well as white-tailed deer, collared peccaries, and coyotes.

== See also ==
- Hans and Pat Suter Wildlife Refuge
- List of botanical gardens in the United States
