= Mirador de la Flor =

Monument in Corpus Christi, Texas, U.S.

Mirador de la Flor (Overlook of the Flower)
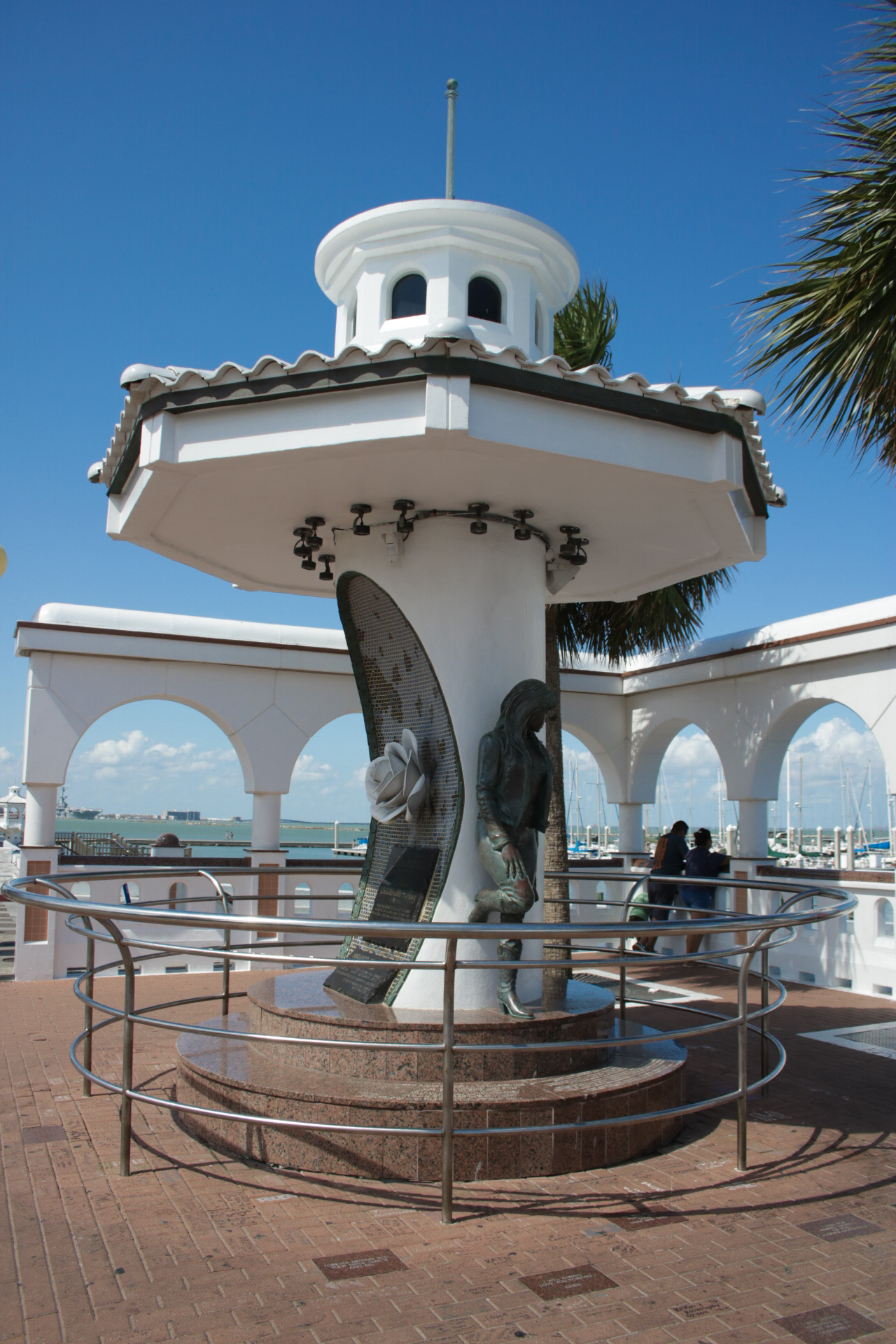
- Full view of the monument, including the statue of Selena

- Location within Texas
- 27°47′48″N 97°23′28″W
- Location: Corpus Christi, Texas

History
- Dedicated: May 25, 1997

Site notes
- Sculptor: H. W. Tatum
- Visitors: 30,000 (around)

Mirador de la Flor (English: Overlook of the Flower) is a monument in Corpus Christi, Texas, that honors Tejano musician Selena Quintanilla-Pérez, who was murdered on March 31, 1995 at age 23. About 30,000 people visit the monument every year, especially citizens of Corpus Christi and cities located in Texas. It is located a few miles north of Selena's burial site at Seaside Memorial Park, and features a life-sized bronze statue of the singer, sculpted by Corpus Christi native H.W. "Buddy" Tatum. Selena's statue leans against a concrete pillar, looking towards the Corpus Christi Bay.

The monument also features a motif of white roses, said to be Selena's favorite, and a memorial plaque facing Shoreline Boulevard. A 4-foot (1.2 m) high stainless steel barrier was added in 2000 to protect the statue and pillar from graffiti.

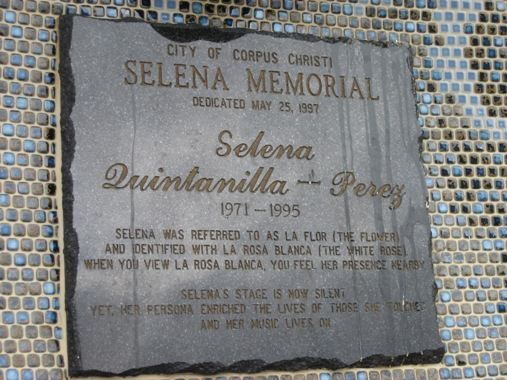
Plaque dedicating Mirador De La Flor to Selena
