= Albert Lee Giddens =

American lawyer (born 1947)

- Born: Albert Lee Giddens; September 29, 1947 (age 79); Corpus Christi, Texas, United States
- Education: University of Texas at Austin
- Occupation: Lawyer
- Known for: Law
- Website: http://www.Accidentinjurylawyerhouston.com Giddens & Burns Website

Albert Lee Giddens (born September 29, 1947) is an American trial lawyer in Texas. His firm made its name handling plaintiff's litigation, representing clients suing for wrongful death and personal injuries throughout the state of Texas. Giddens is Board Certified in both Personal Injury and Civil Trial Law by the Texas Board of Legal Specialization.

== Biography ==
=== Early life ===
Born September 29, 1947, in Corpus Christi, Texas, Giddens graduated with a Bachelor of Arts from the University of Texas in 1970. After graduation, Giddens joined the Texas National Guard. After his stint in the Texas National Guard Giddens returned to the University of Texas, where he graduated from University of Texas School of Law in 1974. After graduation Giddens joined the Texaco corporate law division before founding his own firm in 1979.

=== Legal career ===
Giddens made a name for himself handling plaintiff's litigation, one of his most notable cases came early in his career when he represented a family whose two-year-old had been electrocuted and as a result lost both of her arms. This tragedy made national news and the plaintiff subsequently made several television appearances including one on 20/20 and another on 60 Minutes.

Several years later after the Phillips Disaster of 1989 Giddens again found himself thrust into the spotlight. Mr. Giddens successfully represented the families of numerous victims in their wrongful death claims, securing substantial awards.

Giddens currently owns and operates the Law Firm of Giddens & Burns handling primarily personal injury and wrongful death cases. However, Giddens also handles a wide variety of civil litigation cases.,

=== Political career ===
In 1999 Giddens was elected to the Deer Park Independent School District Board of Trustees. He served as secretary to the board of trustees, until 2006, when he was elected to vice president. In 2009 Giddens was elected to president of the board of trustees, and currently holds this position.
