= North Beach, Corpus Christi, Texas =

Tourist area on the El Rincon peninsula

North Beach, historically known as Rincon Point, is a section of Corpus Christi, Texas located on the far north end of the city. It is on the El Rincon peninsula surrounded by Corpus Christi Bay and Nueces Bay. North Beach is a area of high tourism and improvements to public space are backed by the local group North Beach Community Association. The beach is known for relatively calm waters because of its position within the protected bays; however, storm surges and winds are still dangerous when hurricanes and tropical storms pass through Nueces Bay.

== History ==
The beach name changed to Corpus Christi Beach in the 1950s, but the City Council changed the name back to "North Beach" in 2012. Many local business owners and residents requested this change because most people still referred to it as the "North Beach". The city then erected a $750,000 giant archway with "North Beach" written on it in 2012 at the gateway to this tourist area, making the beaches name set in stone.

North Beach in the 1840s was just a sandbar, northeast of Kinney's Trading Post. In 1845-1846, future president Ulysses S. Grant and General Zachary Taylor, spent the winter months on the waterfront preparing for the Mexican American War with his fellow soldiers. Later, in 1912,the Corpus Christi Beach Hotel opened on North Beach. After the U.S. government lease ended on the building in 1927, it became a luxury tourist attraction. It was from this time until the development of the Harbor Bridge in 1959, that the beach was in its "Golden Age". North Beach was adorned with a boardwalk, the " Spanish Ballroom" of the Breakers Hotel and many other attractions that brought North Beach to its prime with visitors from all over the world.

When a new causeway to Padre Island and the Harbor Bridge of Corpus Christi were completed by October 1959, traffic to North Beach began to decline. Newer attempts at bringing interest back to North Beach have been made keep the area alive. Local group North Beach Community Association, work to keep advancing the area with their campaign "Bring back the Boardwalk" that began in 1998.

== Wildlife ==
North Beach is made up of a variety of coastal habitat such as small wetlands and grassy flats which are located near Dolphin Park and the North Beach Eco Park Area. Other habitats include sea grass beds, marshes, and sand flats. These habitats are home to many different fish, crustaceans, mollusks, and bird species, but they also act as a natural buffer between the backshore and the shore which helps protect the shorelines from storm surges and erosion. The beach is a site for bird watching, particularly during the migratory season in winter when the different species of shorebirds pass through to stay in warmer climates. The endangered Whooping Crane is a one of the species observed in the coastal region, as they can be found at the Aransas National Wildlife Refuge during this season. North Beach is also home to several federally listed bird species, including the Atwater's Prairie Chicken and the Northern Aplomado Falcon. Both of these species live on the coastal prairie grasslands which is the largest in Texas.

In order to preserve North Beach and these ecosystems, developments of oyster reefs have begun. Oyster reefs, or "living shorelines", are designed to reduce the impact of waves and erosion while restoring the natural habitats surrounding the area. These natural barriers, supported by the National Oceanic and Atmospheric Administration, effectively provides nursery grounds for the marine life as well.

== Attractions ==
Along with the beach, the Texas State Aquarium and the USS Lexington are located in Corpus Christi's North Beach area. Together, these two attractions bring in over 800,000 tourists each year. The Corpus Christi Beachwalk, a 10-foot-wide sidewalk that runs parallel to the entire length of the 1.5-mile-long beach, was completed in 2012. Similarly, a three mile long paved path was completed in 2008, connecting the Texas State Aquarium and Dolphin Park, a public recreational area.

== Hurricane of 1919 ==
The 1919 Corpus Christi Hurricane occurred on Sunday, September 14, 1919, hitting North Beach around 8 a.m. The storm amassed wind speeds exceeding 130 miles an hour, classifying it as a Category Four storm. It also had a barometric pressure of 29.40 mb. The sixteen foot storm surge sank over ten major ships and tankers in the Nueces Bay causing a leakage of black crude oil into the water.

The Hurricane remains one of the deadliest natural disasters in Texas history and the 20th century. It was responsible for hundreds of deaths, with the official death toll amounting 287 accounted deaths; however, the actual number may have ranged from 600 and 1,000 deaths.
