= Corpus Christi, Texas =

Corpus Christi
- City
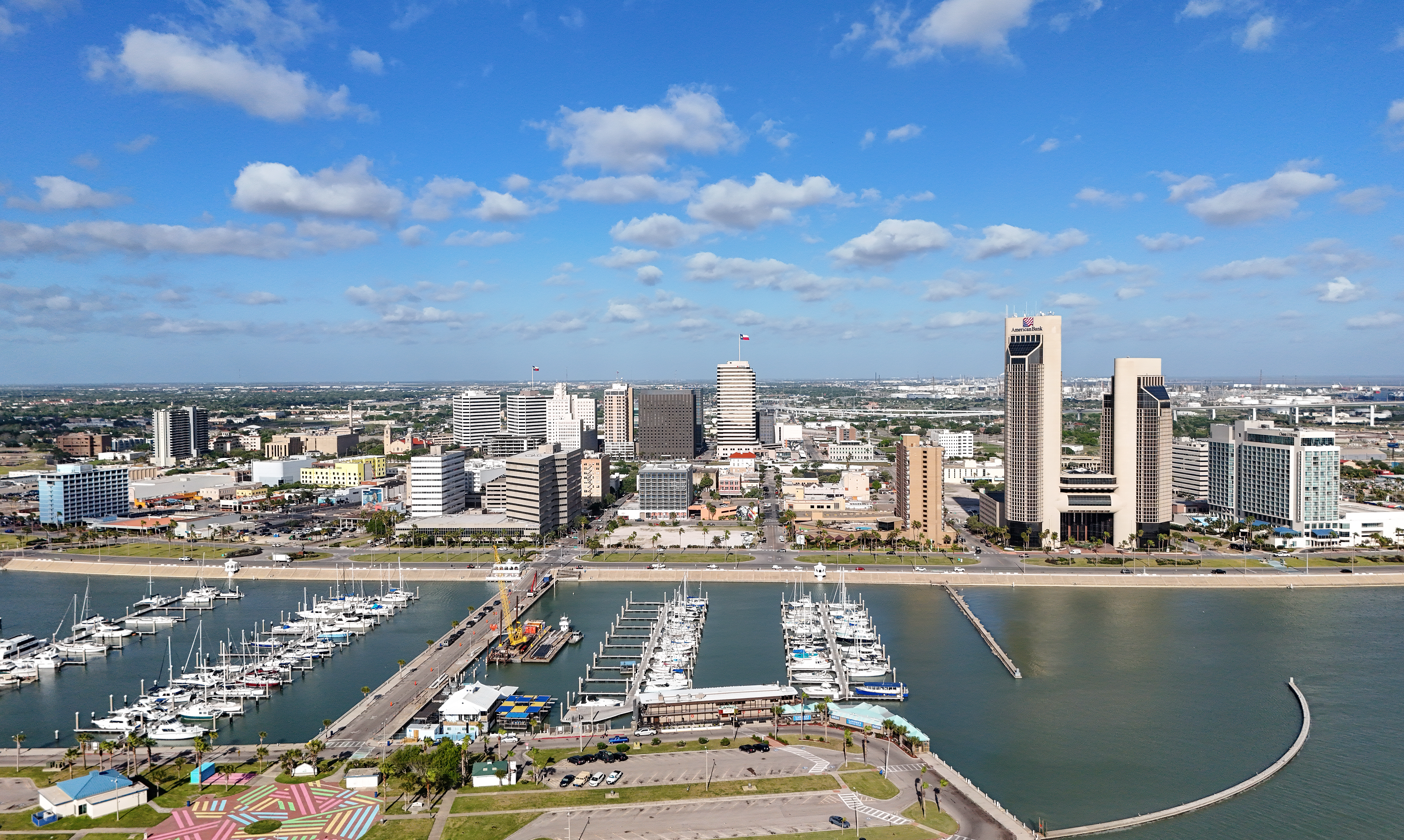
- Downtown Bayfront

- Flag Seal
- Nicknames: Corpus, Sparkling City by the Sea, Hampton Roads of the Southwest
- Interactive map of Corpus Christi
- Location within Texas Location within United States
- Coordinates: 27°44′34″N 97°24′7″W
- Country: United States
- State: Texas
- Counties: Nueces, Kleberg, San Patricio, Aransas
- Established: 1852
- Named for: Body of Christ

Government
  - Type: Council–manager
  - Mayor: Paulette Guajardo
  - City manager: Peter Zanoni

Area
  - City: 488.73 sq mi (1,265.80 km^{2})
  - Land: 160.63 sq mi (416.03 km^{2})
  - Water: 328.10 sq mi (849.77 km^{2})
- Elevation: 6.6 ft (2 m)

Population (2020)
  - City: 317,863
  - Estimate (2025): 317,247 ▼
  - Rank: US: 63rd
  - Density: 2,033.2/sq mi (785.01/km^{2})
  - Urban: 339,066 (US: 119th)
  - Urban density: 2,623/sq mi (1,012.7/km^{2})
  - Metro: 421,933 (US: 121st)
  - CSA: 525,875 (86th)
- Time zone: UTC−6 (CST)
  - Summer (DST): UTC−5 (CDT)
- ZIP Codes: 78401, 78402, 78404–78419
- Area code: 361
- FIPS code: 48-17000
- GNIS feature ID: 2410234
- Website: www.corpuschristitx.gov

Corpus Christi (/ˌkɔːrpəs ˈkrɪsti/ KOR-pəs KRIS-tee; Latin for 'Body of Christ') is a coastal city in the U.S. state of Texas. It is the county seat and largest city of Nueces County in South Texas, with portions extending into Aransas, Kleberg, and San Patricio counties. With a population of 317,247 as of July 1, 2025, it is the eighth-most populous city in Texas.

Corpus Christi is 130 miles (210 km) southeast of San Antonio and 208 miles (335 km) southwest of Houston. Its political boundaries encompass Nueces Bay and Corpus Christi Bay. Its zoned boundaries include small land parcels or water inlets of three neighboring counties. The Corpus Christi metropolitan area had an estimated population of 442,600. It is also the hub of the six-county Corpus Christi–Kingsville–Alice combined statistical area.

Corpus Christi serves as an economic center in South Texas. Much of the city's economy is supported by different industries such as energy, manufacturing, healthcare, tourism, and maritime commerce. The Port of Corpus Christi is one of the largest ports in the United States by total waterborne tonnage, playing a major role in both domestic and international trade. The region is served by the Corpus Christi International Airport. Corpus Christi is also home to Naval Air Station Corpus Christi, one of two locations training primary student pilots and advanced multiengine pilots of the US military.

== Etymology ==
The city's name means body of Christ in Ecclesiastical Latin, in reference to the Christian sacrament of Holy Communion. It is uncertain if Alonso Álvarez de Pineda was the first European explorer to discover the bay of Corpus Christi, but he is credited for claiming the land and naming it after the Feast of Corpus Christi in 1519, which was the day he was thought to have discovered the bay.

== History ==
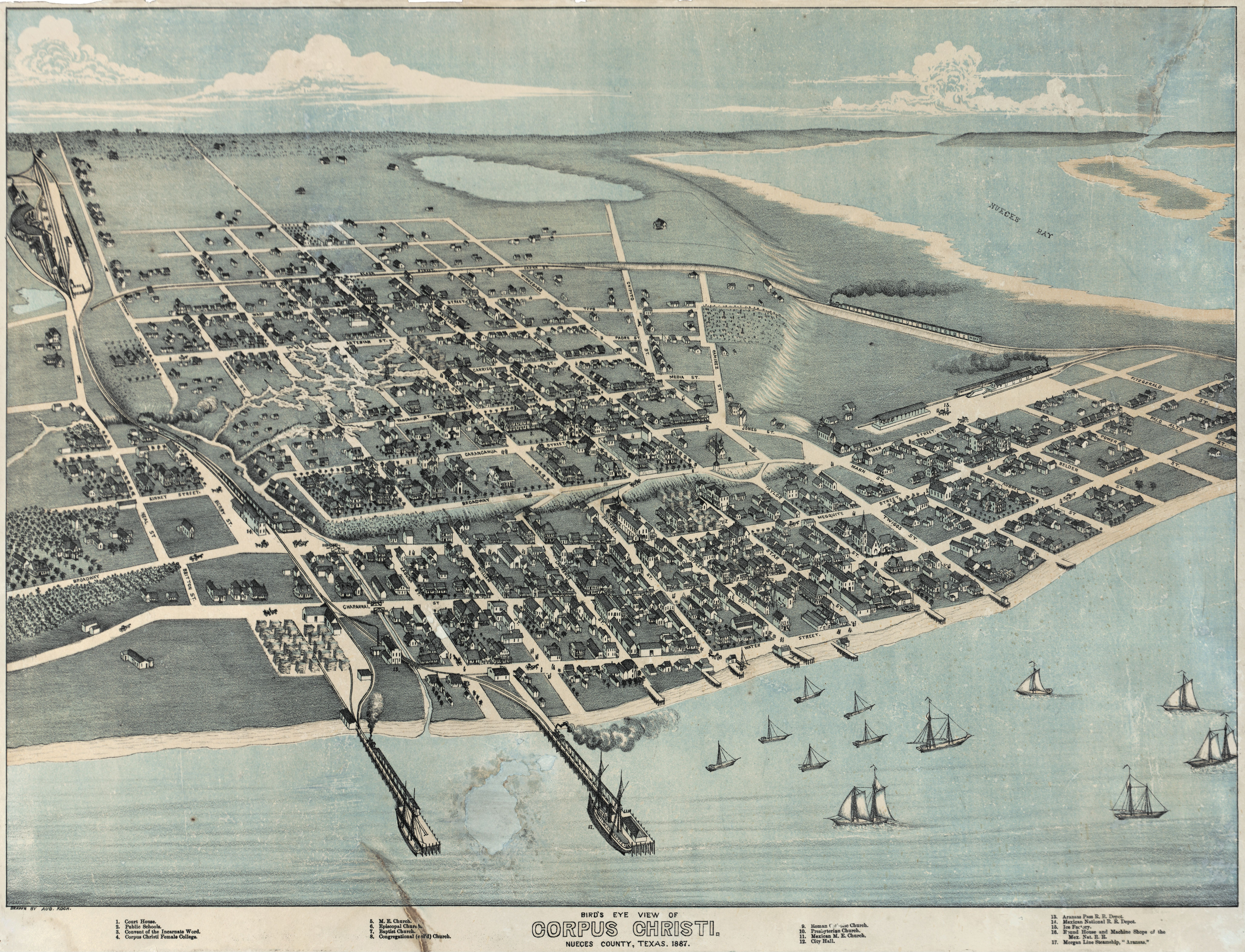
Map of Corpus Christi in 1887

Spaniard Alonso Alvarez de Pineda traveled in 1519 to this bay on the day of the religious Feast of Corpus Christi, so named the semitropical bay Corpus Christi.

Cabeza de Vaca and his companions may have been the first Europeans to reach Corpus Christi in the 1500s, the first documented exploration of the Nueces River and Corpus Christi Bay was conducted by Joaquín de Orobio y Basterra in 1747. In 1749, José de Escandón, governor and captain general of Nuevo Santander, proposed establishing a settlement called Villa de Vedoya near the mouth of the Nueces River. He organized a colony of about 50 families to settle the head of the bay, though this was short-lived. A prolonged drought and inadequate supplies caused the effort to be abandoned before settlers reached their destination.

Additional settlement proposals followed during the late 18th century and early 19th century. Manuel de Escandón proposed another colony in 1787, and Spanish authorities considered relocating Nuestra Señora del Refugio Mission to the area, but these plans were never realized. During the 1830s, Baron Johann von Rachnitz and abolitionist Benjamin Lundy separately proposed colonies near the mouth of the Nueces River, though the effort never succeeded.

In 1839, the first known permanent settlement of Corpus Christi was established by Colonel Henry Lawrence Kinney and William P. Aubrey as Kinney's Trading Post, or Kinney's Ranch. It was a small trading post that sold supplies to a Mexican revolutionary army camped about 25 mi (40 km) west. In July 1845, U.S. troops commanded by General Zachary Taylor set up camp there in preparation for war with Mexico, where they remained until March 1846. About a year later, the settlement was named Corpus Christi and was incorporated on September 9, 1852.

The Battle of Corpus Christi was fought between August 12 and August 18, 1862, during the American Civil War. United States Navy forces blockading Texas fought a small land and sea engagement with Confederate forces in and around Corpus Christi Bay and bombarded the city. Union forces defeated Confederate States Navy ships operating in the area, but were repulsed when they landed on the coast.

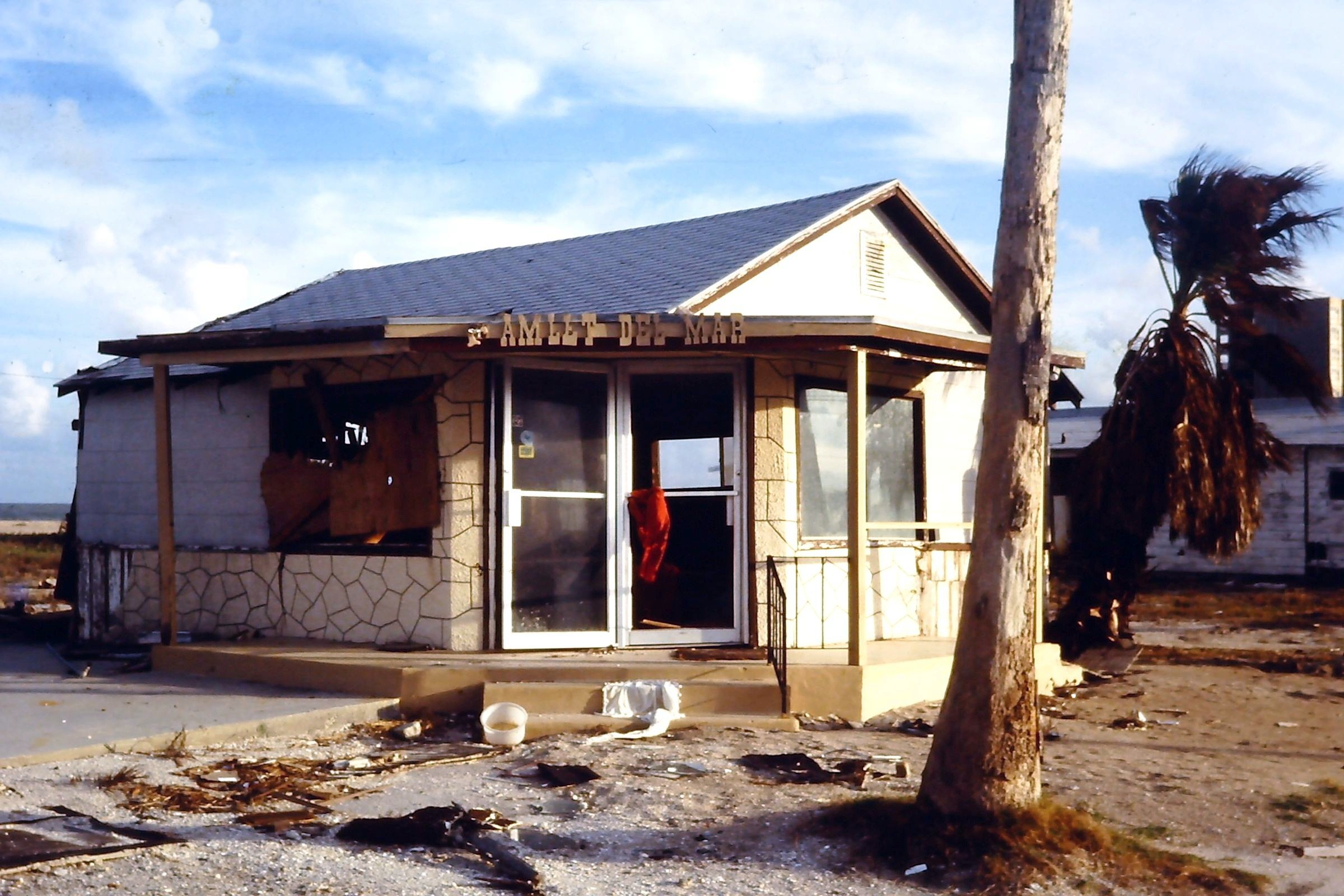
Damaged restaurant after Hurricane Allen

The Port of Corpus Christi

Before 1836, the bay was primarily used for smuggling operations due to the natural protection the bay provided. After the Texas Revolution, the bay started seeing use by traders. During the Civil War, the bay was under the ownership of the Confederacy. It served as a trading harbor until 1864 when the Union secured it. On September 15th 1926, the Port of Corpus Christi officially opened after the massive efforts of Elihu Harrison Ropes to dredge out the bay.

Corpus Christi Naval Air Station

The decision to build the Naval Air Station was made due to the United States' lack of trained air pilots. The 75th Congress ordered the start of construction in 1938. On March 12th 1941, the Corpus Christi Naval Air Station was put into operation with its first skipper being Captain Alva Bernhard.

=== Civil Rights ===
In November 1873, seven Mexican shepherds were lynched by a mob near the city. The crime was never solved.

In February 1929, the League of United Latin American Citizens (LULAC) was founded in Corpus Christi. This organization was created to battle racial discrimination against Hispanic people in the United States. Since its founding, LULAC has grown and now has a national headquarters in Washington, D.C.

In March 1949, the American GI Forum (AGIF) was founded in Corpus Christi. Currently, AGIF focuses on veteran's issues, education, and civil-rights issues. This organization was founded after concerns over the segregation of Mexican-American veterans from other veterans groups and the denial of medical services based on race by the United States Department of Veterans Affairs.

Cisneros v. Corpus Christi Independent School District (1970) was the first case to extend the U.S. Supreme Court's Brown v. the Board of Education of Topeka, Kansas decision (1954) to Mexican Americans. It recognized them as a minority group that could be and was frequently discriminated against. Such segregation and discrimination were ruled unconstitutional. Judge Woodrow Seals found that the school board consciously fostered a system that perpetuated traditional segregation. This included a system that bused Anglo students to schools out of their neighborhoods, renovated old schools in black and Mexican-American neighborhoods rather than building new ones, assigned black and Hispanic teachers to segregated schools, and limited hiring of such teachers at other schools; the school board also lacked a majority-to-minority busing system.

=== Natural Disasters ===
The 1919 Storm devastated the city, killing hundreds on September 14. Only three structures survived the storm on North Beach. To protect the city, the seawall was built. The city also suffered damage from Hurricane Celia in 1970 and Hurricane Allen in 1980, but little damage from Hurricane Ike in 2008. In 2017, the city was affected by Hurricane Harvey, then by Hurricane Hanna in 2020. Rough surf from Hurricane Laura caused one death and one injury at a beach in the city in late August 2020, just a month after Hanna.

== Geography ==
Corpus Christi is situated on fluvial deposits that are of Holocene—Pleistocene age. Although no solidified rock occurs naturally at the surface, the Deweyville Formation of sand, silt, clay, and gravel, is locally indurated with calcium carbonate (caliche) deposits. In 2017, Hurricane Harvey's storm surge eroded down to shale bedrock at a depth around 40 feet in Packery Channel, an artificial pass cut between North Padre and Mustang Islands. This feature has become a gathering place for game fish, and can be identified from the surface by its whirlpool-like current. The large, shallow bay makes Corpus Christi an ideal feeding place for birds, which is one reason why Corpus Christi is known as the "Bird Capital" of North America; consequently, the San Diego Audubon Society has designated Corpus Christi as "America's birdiest place".

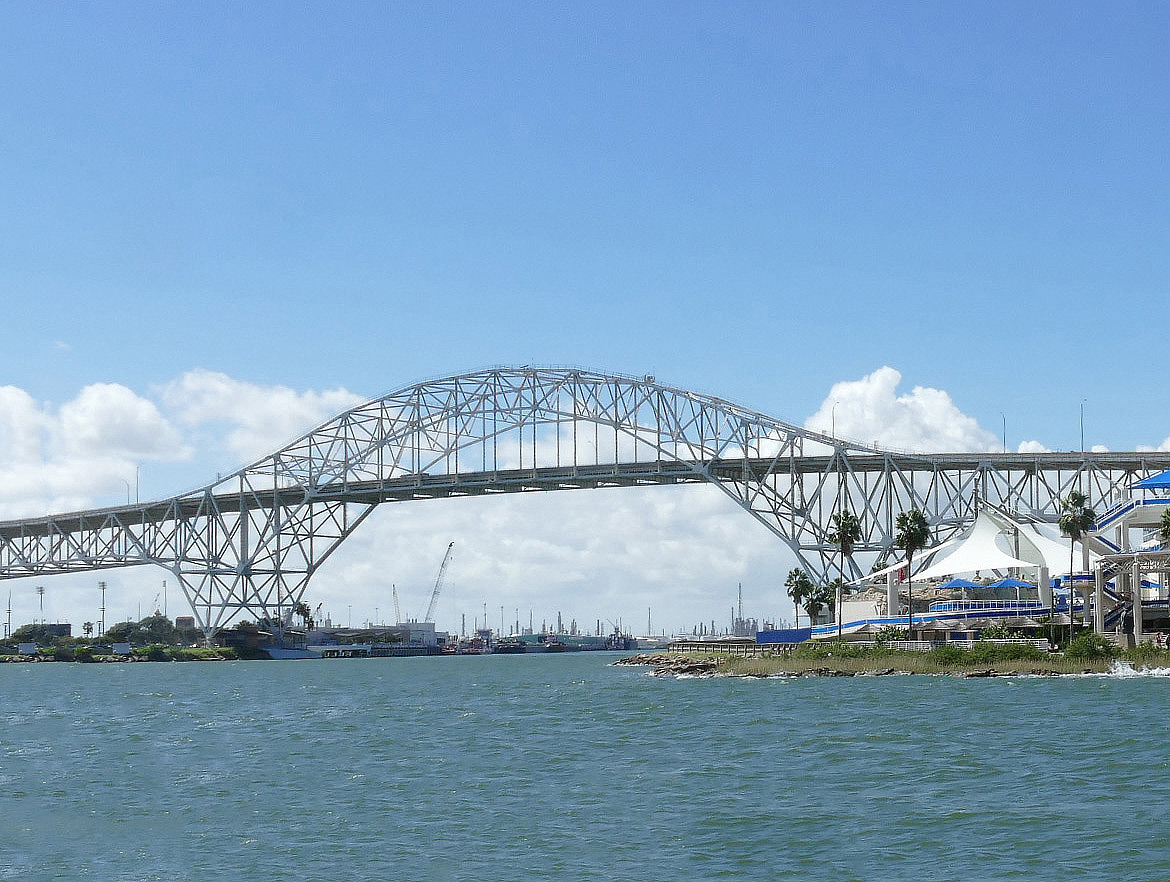
Harbor Bridge - replacement completed 2025

According to the United States Census Bureau, Corpus Christi has a total area of 460.2 square miles (1,192.0 km^{2}), of which 154.6 mi^{2} (400.5 km^{2}, 33.60%) are land and 305.6 mi^{2} (791.5 km^{2}, 66.40%) are covered by water.

=== Water ===
Drinking water for the city is supplied by three reservoirs, Lake Corpus Christi, the Choke Canyon Reservoir, and Lake Texana. Through an effective regional partnership with the Nueces River Authority and the Port of Corpus Christi Authority, a 101 mi (163 km) pipeline was built which transports water from Lake Texana to the city's O.N. Stevens Water Treatment Plant. It was named the Mary Rhodes Pipeline, after the late mayor. Phase two of the pipeline is underway to draw water from the Colorado River. All reservoirs are outside the city limits, but Lake Corpus Christi and Choke Canyon Reservoir are managed directly by the public utility of the City of Corpus Christi. To support future water needs, plans are being completed to build a desalinization plant.

=== Water Crisis ===
Corpus Christi has been going through a drought since 2021. Corpus Christi currently has an average of 317,000 residents that all use water freely every day, until expansion of industry construction began reducing the city's water supply. As of 2026, Corpus Christi's officials are expecting a "water catastrophe" due to poor water management. This would impact residents and industry in the city, including the refineries which provide jet fuel to other parts of Texas. The daily rate of water usage in Corpus Christi is 100,000 gallons of water per day, but resident water usage recently has put the city at 127,500 gallons a day, classifying them as high volume users. Though residents are considered high volume users, the industries (as of February 2026) use 60% of the city’s water supply. Corpus Christi reservoirs were at their lowest in April 2026, sitting at only 14% full. Six months later, the reservoir sits at 45.2% full. The expansion of industry versus the water supply and demand has majorly attributed to the drought worsening. The city recently voted against desalination plant construction due to the already risky reduced water supply. Now residents of Corpus Christi must follow a Stage 3 water conservation throughout the city. Following Stage 3 procedures includes using less water outdoors, which can be watering lawns, cleaning sidewalks/cars, and even fountains. Any violation to following Stage 3 procedures can result to up a $500 fine to try to enforce water conservation effectively. The city will be affected until there's more rainfall or there are new supplies developed to help with Corpus Christi's water crisis.

=== Annexation ===
Since its founding, the city has annexed nearby lands and waters for growth and development purposes. The original area encompassed several city blocks in present-day downtown Corpus Christi with the majority of city expansion occurring in the 20th century.

=== Neighborhoods ===
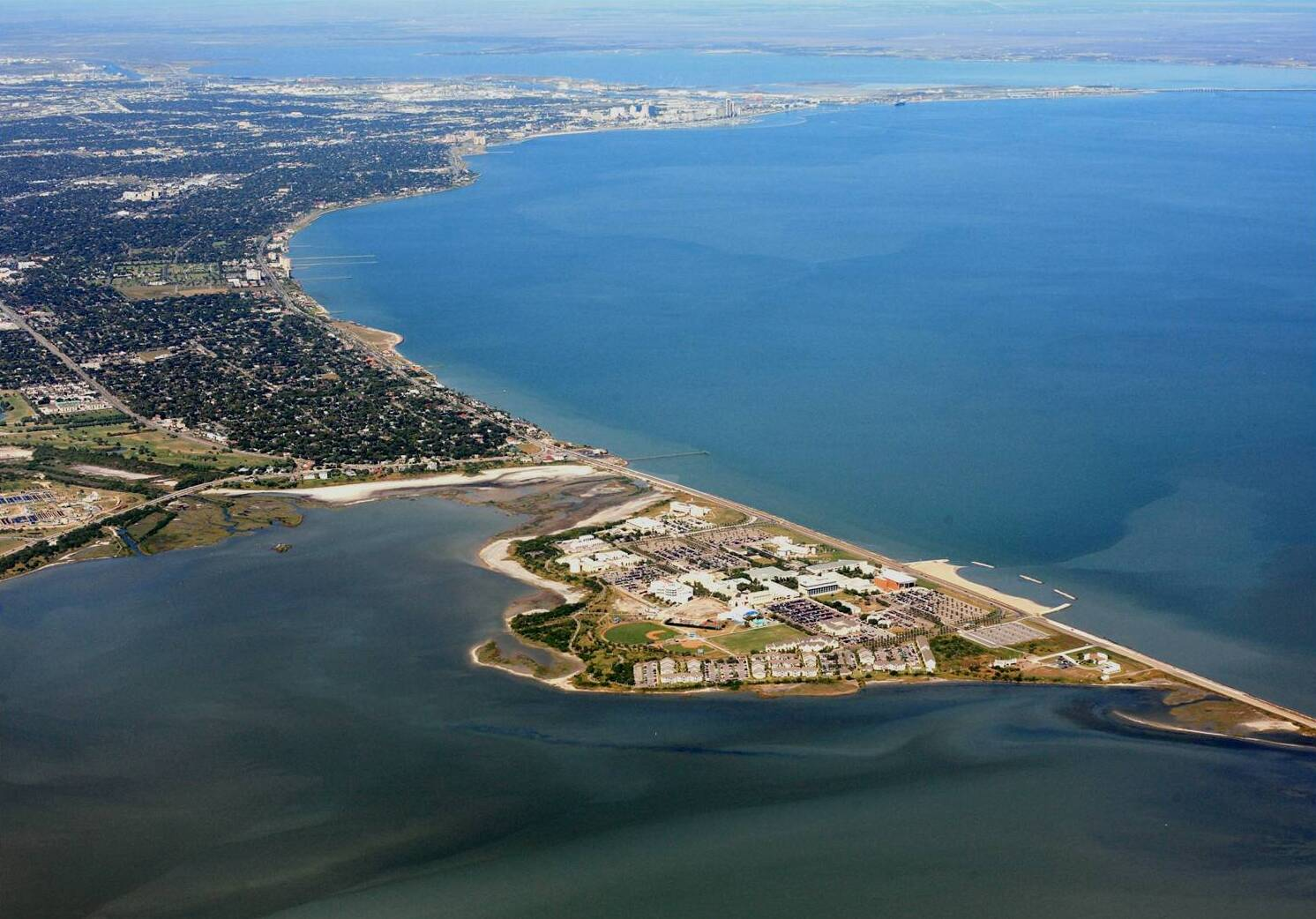
Aerial view of Texas A&M University–Corpus Christi

- Annaville
- Clarkwood
- Bayside
- Calallen
- Flour Bluff
- Gardendale
- Hillcrest
- North Beach
- South Side
- Mustang Island
- North Padre Island

=== Suburbs ===
- Portland
- Robstown
- Aransas Pass
- Port Aransas
- Sinton
- Odem
- Gregory
- Mathis
- Taft
- Ingleside
- Agua Dulce
- Bishop

=== Climate ===
Corpus Christi has a humid subtropical climate (Köppen: Cfa), with hot and humid summers, and short mild winters. The period from November through February is the coolest time of year in the city, while June through September is the hottest. October is still hot, but not as hot as the summer months. Rainfall is spread throughout the year, and there is rarely ever snow or ice.

The city's record high temperature is 109 °F (43 °C), on September 5, 2000, and the hottest month August 2012 with an average of 88.3 °F (31.3 °C). Average night-time winter lows in January, the coldest month, are a little less than 50 °F (10 °C) and its record low is 11 °F (−12 °C) on February 12, 1899. The coldest maximum of 26 °F (−3 °C) occurred on five occasions, the most recent being on January 30, 1951. (Note: The other cases of a 26 °F (−3 °C) maximum have been December 20, 1924, February 12, 1899, January 25, 1897, and January 16, 1888.) Winter and early spring are generally dry, and average monthly precipitation is highest in September, when the threat from hurricanes and other tropical weather systems is greatest. The coolest month on record has been February 1905, with a mean of 45.6 °F (7.6 °C). In December 2004, the city experienced snowfall on Christmas Eve, the city's largest recorded snowstorm at 4.4 in (11 cm). The snow melted the day after Christmas. The city experienced light snowfall a second time, on December 8, 2017, nearly 13 years later.

Between 1981 and 2010, Corpus Christi averaged 31.73 in (806 mm) of rainfall; however, long periods with very little rainfall are normal, and hurricanes can frequently produce daily falls of over 4 in (100 mm). The wettest day on record is July 2, 2007, with 9.86 inches or 250 millimetres, while the wettest month on record is September 1967, with 20.33 in (516 mm), including four days with over 3 in (76 mm). Eight months with not even a trace of rainfall have happened, of which the most recent was May 1998, and 21 with merely a trace. The longest spell without measurable rainfall in Corpus Christi has been 55 days from June 23 to August 17 (inclusive), 1895, and from June 1 to July 25, 1915, while easily the driest calendar year has been 1917, with a mere 5.38 in (137 mm). The two wettest calendar years have been 1888 with 48.16 in (1,223 mm) and 1991 with 48.07 in (1,221 mm), although from August 1967 to July 1968, 59.09 in (1,501 mm) fell, and for the 12 months ending January 1918, only 5.22 in (133 mm).

Hurricanes seldom hit the city, but those which have were destructive, such as the 1919 Florida Keys hurricane and Hurricane Harvey in 2017. The city also can see tornadoes, with an F2 tornado hitting the area on April 29, 1961.

Climate data for Corpus Christi, Texas (Corpus Christi Int'l), 1991–2020 normals
| Month | Jan | Feb | Mar | Apr | May | Jun | Jul | Aug | Sep | Oct | Nov | Dec | Year |
|---|---|---|---|---|---|---|---|---|---|---|---|---|---|
| Record high °F (°C) | 91 (33) | 97 (36) | 102 (39) | 102 (39) | 103 (39) | 107 (42) | 105 (41) | 107 (42) | 109 (43) | 101 (38) | 98 (37) | 91 (33) | 109 (43) |
| Mean maximum °F (°C) | 82.4 (28.0) | 86.6 (30.3) | 89.9 (32.2) | 92.6 (33.7) | 93.9 (34.4) | 96.0 (35.6) | 97.2 (36.2) | 99.4 (37.4) | 96.8 (36.0) | 93.1 (33.9) | 88.1 (31.2) | 83.8 (28.8) | 100.6 (38.1) |
| Mean daily maximum °F (°C) | 67.9 (19.9) | 71.9 (22.2) | 76.7 (24.8) | 82.6 (28.1) | 87.3 (30.7) | 91.6 (33.1) | 93.7 (34.3) | 95.0 (35.0) | 90.8 (32.7) | 84.9 (29.4) | 76.1 (24.5) | 69.6 (20.9) | 82.3 (27.9) |
| Daily mean °F (°C) | 58.0 (14.4) | 61.9 (16.6) | 67.4 (19.7) | 73.4 (23.0) | 79.0 (26.1) | 83.2 (28.4) | 84.6 (29.2) | 85.4 (29.7) | 81.9 (27.7) | 75.1 (23.9) | 66.2 (19.0) | 59.7 (15.4) | 73.3 (22.9) |
| Mean daily minimum °F (°C) | 48.0 (8.9) | 51.9 (11.1) | 58.1 (14.5) | 64.2 (17.9) | 70.7 (21.5) | 74.9 (23.8) | 75.5 (24.2) | 75.8 (24.3) | 73.0 (22.8) | 65.4 (18.6) | 56.3 (13.5) | 49.8 (9.9) | 63.6 (17.6) |
| Mean minimum °F (°C) | 30.6 (−0.8) | 33.2 (0.7) | 37.5 (3.1) | 46.5 (8.1) | 58.1 (14.5) | 67.1 (19.5) | 70.4 (21.3) | 70.4 (21.3) | 60.5 (15.8) | 47.2 (8.4) | 38.5 (3.6) | 30.1 (−1.1) | 26.5 (−3.1) |
| Record low °F (°C) | 14 (−10) | 11 (−12) | 24 (−4) | 33 (1) | 45 (7) | 56 (13) | 64 (18) | 64 (18) | 52 (11) | 28 (−2) | 27 (−3) | 13 (−11) | 11 (−12) |
| Average rainfall inches (mm) | 1.39 (35) | 1.29 (33) | 2.28 (58) | 2.04 (52) | 3.38 (86) | 3.56 (90) | 2.54 (65) | 2.75 (70) | 5.42 (138) | 3.13 (80) | 2.03 (52) | 1.93 (49) | 31.74 (808) |
| Average rainy days (≥ 0.01 in) | 7.1 | 6.5 | 5.3 | 5.3 | 6.0 | 6.8 | 5.7 | 6.5 | 8.8 | 6.3 | 6.0 | 6.4 | 76.7 |
| Average relative humidity (%) | 77.4 | 76.2 | 74.2 | 76.5 | 78.9 | 77.5 | 74.5 | 74.5 | 76.2 | 74.9 | 75.9 | 76.0 | 76.1 |
| Average dew point °F (°C) | 49.6 (9.8) | 52.7 (11.5) | 57.4 (14.1) | 63.7 (17.6) | 70.2 (21.2) | 73.9 (23.3) | 74.5 (23.6) | 73.9 (23.3) | 71.4 (21.9) | 65.1 (18.4) | 57.0 (13.9) | 50.9 (10.5) | 63.4 (17.4) |
| Mean monthly sunshine hours | 140.2 | 155.7 | 198.1 | 208.4 | 234.1 | 290.4 | 328.1 | 299.7 | 244.2 | 231.9 | 170.4 | 135.1 | 2,636.3 |
| Percentage possible sunshine | 43 | 50 | 53 | 54 | 56 | 70 | 77 | 74 | 66 | 65 | 53 | 42 | 59 |
Source: NOAA (extremes 1887–present, relative humidity and sun 1961–1990, dew point 1986–2015)

== Demographics ==
Historical population
| Census | Pop. | Note | %± |
|---|---|---|---|
| 1860 | 100 | | — |
| 1870 | 2,140 | | 2,040.0% |
| 1880 | 3,257 | | 52.2% |
| 1890 | 4,387 | | 34.7% |
| 1900 | 4,703 | | 7.2% |
| 1910 | 8,222 | | 74.8% |
| 1920 | 10,522 | | 28.0% |
| 1930 | 27,741 | | 163.6% |
| 1940 | 57,301 | | 106.6% |
| 1950 | 108,287 | | 89.0% |
| 1960 | 167,690 | | 54.9% |
| 1970 | 204,525 | | 22.0% |
| 1980 | 231,999 | | 13.4% |
| 1990 | 257,453 | | 11.0% |
| 2000 | 277,454 | | 7.8% |
| 2010 | 305,215 | | 10.0% |
| 2020 | 317,863 | | 4.1% |
| 2025 (est.) | 317,247 | ▼ | −0.2% |
U.S. Decennial Census

=== Racial and ethnic composition ===
Corpus Christi city, Texas – Racial composition Note: the US Census treats Hispanic/Latino as an ethnic category. This table excludes Latinos from the racial categories and assigns them to a separate category. Hispanics/Latinos may be of any race.
| Race (NH = Non-Hispanic) | 2020 | 2010 | 2000 | 1990 | 1980 |
|---|---|---|---|---|---|
| White alone (NH) | 30.2% (96,019) | 33.3% (101,593) | 38.5% (106,901) | 43.8% (112,821) | 47.5% (110,119) |
| Black alone (NH) | 3.9% (12,419) | 3.9% (11,912) | 4.5% (12,404) | 4.5% (11,655) | 5% (11,525) |
| American Indian alone (NH) | 0.3% (847) | 0.3% (792) | 0.3% (822) | 0.3% (768) | 0.2% (536) |
| Asian alone (NH) | 2.4% (7,519) | 1.8% (5,398) | 1.2% (3,382) | 0.8% (1,996) | 0.5% (1,234) |
| Pacific Islander alone (NH) | 0.1% (268) | 0.1% (204) | 0.1% (125) | | |
| Other race alone (NH) | 0.4% (1,144) | 0.1% (369) | 0.1% (296) | 0.2% (505) | 0.2% (356) |
| Multiracial (NH) | 2.1% (6,657) | 0.9% (2,766) | 1% (2,787) | — | — |
| Hispanic/Latino (any race) | 60.7% (192,990) | 59.7% (182,181) | 54.3% (150,737) | 50.4% (129,708) | 46.7% (108,229) |

=== 2020 census ===
As of the 2020 census, Corpus Christi had a population of 317,863. The median age was 36.9 years. 23.5% of residents were under the age of 18 and 15.4% of residents were 65 years of age or older. For every 100 females there were 97.8 males, and for every 100 females age 18 and over there were 95.6 males age 18 and over.

99.1% of residents lived in urban areas, while 0.9% lived in rural areas.

There were 118,823 households in Corpus Christi, of which 32.5% had children under the age of 18 living in them. Of all households, 42.6% were married-couple households, 21.2% were households with a male householder and no spouse or partner present, and 28.6% were households with a female householder and no spouse or partner present. About 26.6% of all households were made up of individuals and 9.8% had someone living alone who was 65 years of age or older.

There were 134,397 housing units, of which 11.6% were vacant. Among occupied housing units, 58.1% were owner-occupied and 41.9% were renter-occupied. The homeowner vacancy rate was 1.9% and the rental vacancy rate was 11.9%.

By 2020, its racial and ethnic makeup was 30.21% non-Hispanic White, 3.91% Black or African American, 0.27% Native American, 2.37% Asian, 0.08% Pacific Islander, 0.36% some other race, 2.09% multiracial, and 60.71% Hispanic or Latino of any race.

Racial composition as of the 2020 census
| Race | Number | Percent |
|---|---|---|
| White | 170,219 | 53.6% |
| Black or African American | 13,996 | 4.4% |
| American Indian and Alaska Native | 2,706 | 0.9% |
| Asian | 7,905 | 2.5% |
| Native Hawaiian and Other Pacific Islander | 357 | 0.1% |
| Some other race | 40,390 | 12.7% |
| Two or more races | 82,290 | 25.9% |
| Hispanic or Latino (of any race) | 192,990 | 60.7% |

=== 2010 census ===
At the 2010 census, 305,215 people resided in Corpus Christi, a 10.0% increase since 2000.

According to the 2010 census, 80.9% of Corpus Christi's population was White; 4.3% was African American; 1.8% Asian; 0.1% Pacific Islander; 10.4% of some other race; and 2.5% of two or more races. About 62.23% of Corpus Christi's population was of Hispanic or Latino origin, of any race, and 33.3% of the population was non-Hispanic White, down from 56% in 1970.

=== 2000 census ===
In 2000, the racial makeup was 71.62% White, 4.67% African American, 0.64% Native American, 1.28% Asian, 0.08% Pacific Islander, 18.58% from other races, and 3.13% from two or more races. Hispanics of any race were 54.33% of the population.

=== American Community Survey estimates ===
Of its 117,210 households in 2020, the American Community Survey's 2019–2023 estimates approximated 57.9% lived in owner-occupied housing. The median value of an owner-occupied housing unit was $197,100, with a monthly mortgage rate of $1,831. In the same study, 51% of housing units were valued from under $100,000 to $200,000. The median gross rent was $1,230 and there was an average of 2.62 persons per household. The median household income was $66,325, and the per capita income was $33,579. An estimated 17.5% of the population lived at or below the poverty line.

== Economy ==
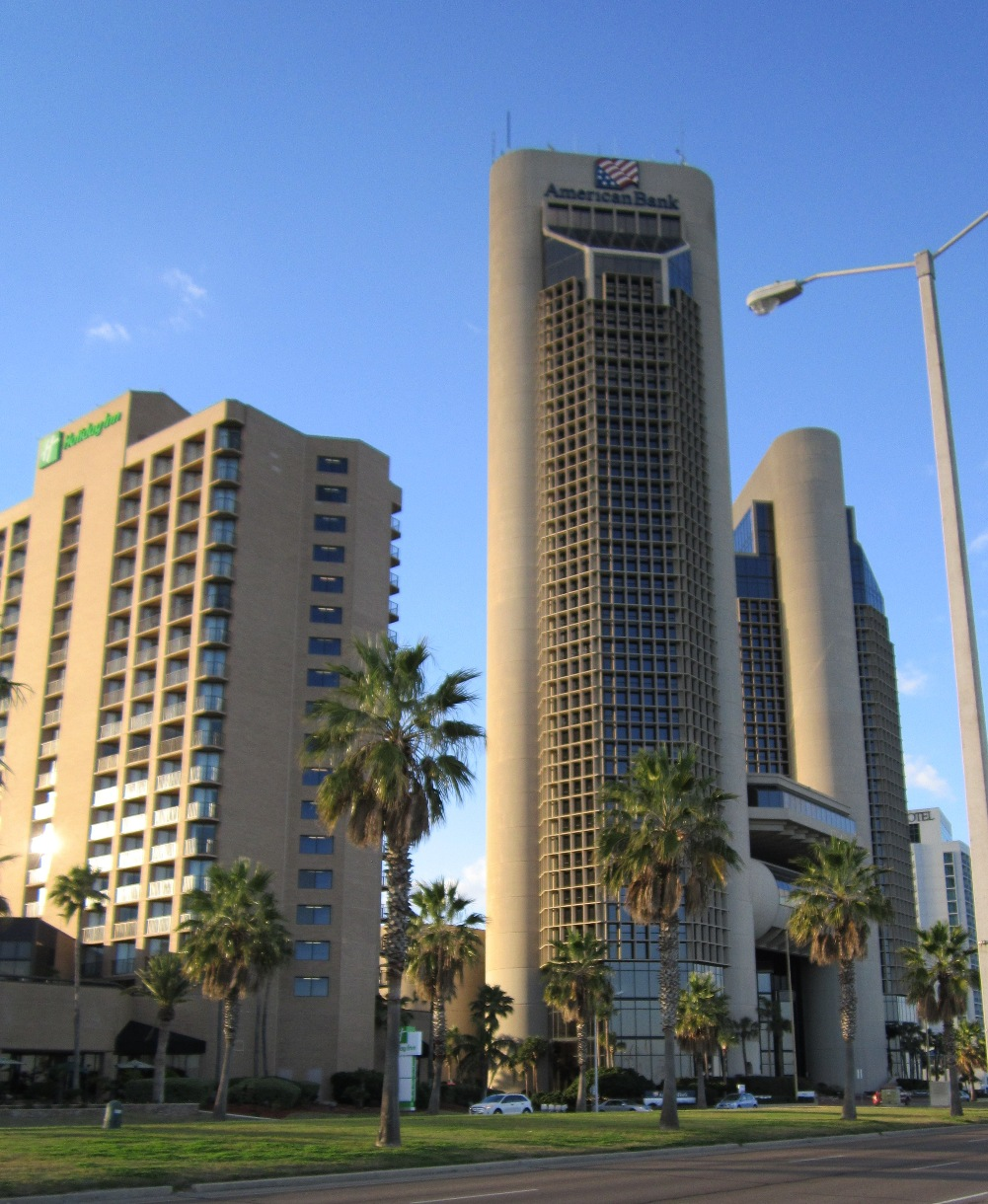
American Bank Tower, 2014

The majority of the population is employed in the services, wholesale and retail trades, and government sectors. Corpus Christi has an unemployment rate of 4.5% as of July 2019.

The Port of Corpus Christi is a major economic driver for the Coastal Bend region and serves as one of the nation's leading energy exportation locations. The port supports billion of dollars in annual economic activity through mostly oil, agricultural products, and cargo movement. Much of the local economy is driven by tourism and the oil and petrochemicals industry. In 2005, the port was ranked as the 47th-largest in the world by cargo tonnage.

Regarding to tourism economy, the popular Buc Days festival is an example of a way the local economy and businesses are boosted through tourism. The city helps support the event through subsidies, seen as a way to boost the local economy and community engagement.

Corpus Christi is home to Naval Air Station Corpus Christi, providing 6,200 civilian jobs to the local economy, making it the single largest employer in the city. Corpus Christi Army Depot, located on NAS Corpus Christi, is the largest helicopter repair facility in the world.

Corpus Christi is the original home of the headquarters of Whataburger, a fast-food restaurant operator and franchiser with 650 stores in 10 states and Mexico; the company relocated its headquarters to San Antonio in 2009. Other large employers include Christus Spohn Health System at 5,400 local employees, the Corpus Christi Independent School District with 5,178, H-E-B at 5,000, and Bay Ltd. at 2,100. Other companies based in Corpus Christi include Stripes Convenience Stores and AEP Texas.

According to the U.S. Bureau of Labor Statistics from 2023, some of the largest occupational groups in the Corpus Christi metropolitan area include healthcare practitioners, registered nurses, office and administratie workes, transportation workers, educators, and construction occupations.

Corpus Christi became the first major city to offer citywide free wi-fi in April 2005 and to allow remote meter reading after a meter reader was attacked by a dog. In 2007, the network was purchased by Earthlink for $5.5 million, and stopped being a free service on May 31, 2007.

== Culture ==
Various sections of Corpus Christi maintain distinct senses of identity and community from the city proper, especially the Calallen and Flour Bluff areas.

=== Attractions ===
The city is home to a number of popular destinations for both tourists and residents. The official visitor and tourism information organization is the Corpus Christi Convention and Visitors Bureau. Some of the most visited attractions are located on North Beach, where the Texas State Aquarium and the USS Lexington Museum on the Bay are located.

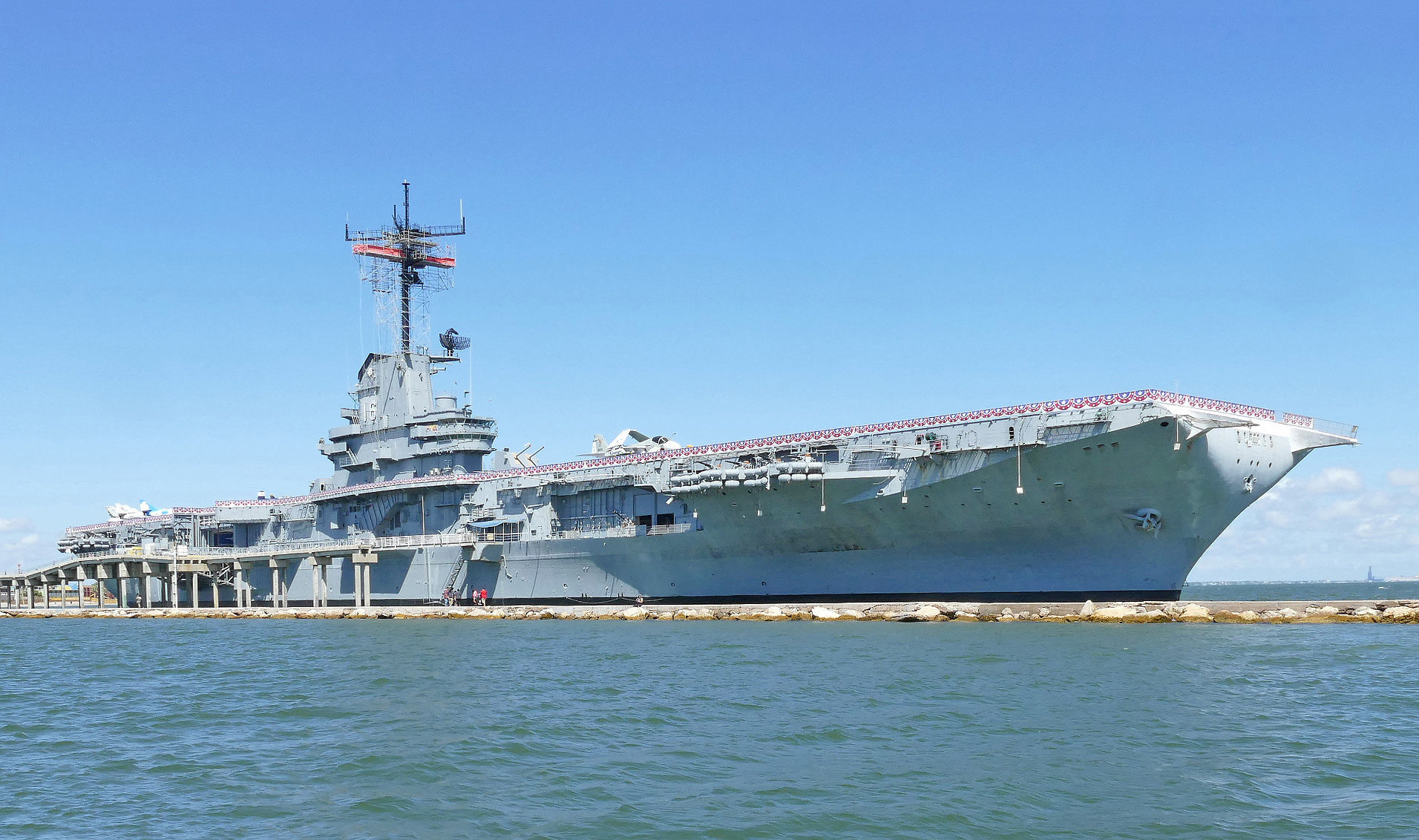
USS Lexington floating museum

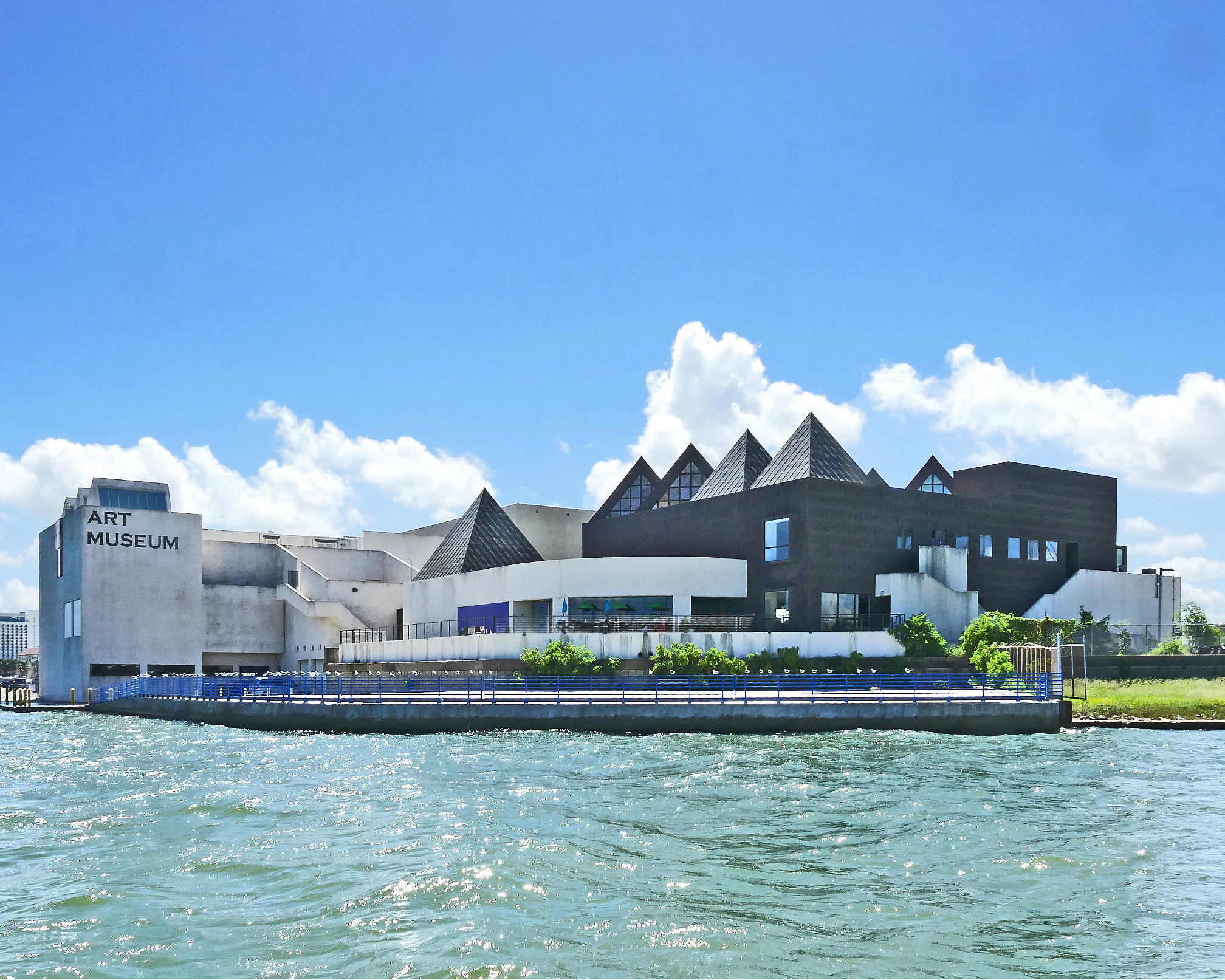
Art Museum of South Texas

USS Lexington was also part of the set for the 2001 film Pearl Harbor. Corpus Christi's museum district is located near USS Lexington. Some attractions located in the museum district are the Museum of Asian Cultures, the Corpus Christi Museum of Science and History, the South Texas Institute for the Arts, and the Harbor Playhouse Theatre, one of the oldest continually operating community theatres in Texas. Heritage Park is also in the museum district, where a number of older restored houses can be found. The downtown area, of which the museum district is a part, is home to skyscrapers such as One Shoreline Plaza, company offices, various shops, a popular center of marinas, and Mirador de la Flor. Downtown also is home of K Space Contemporary, a nonprofit art organization promoting and presenting local, regional, and national contemporary art.

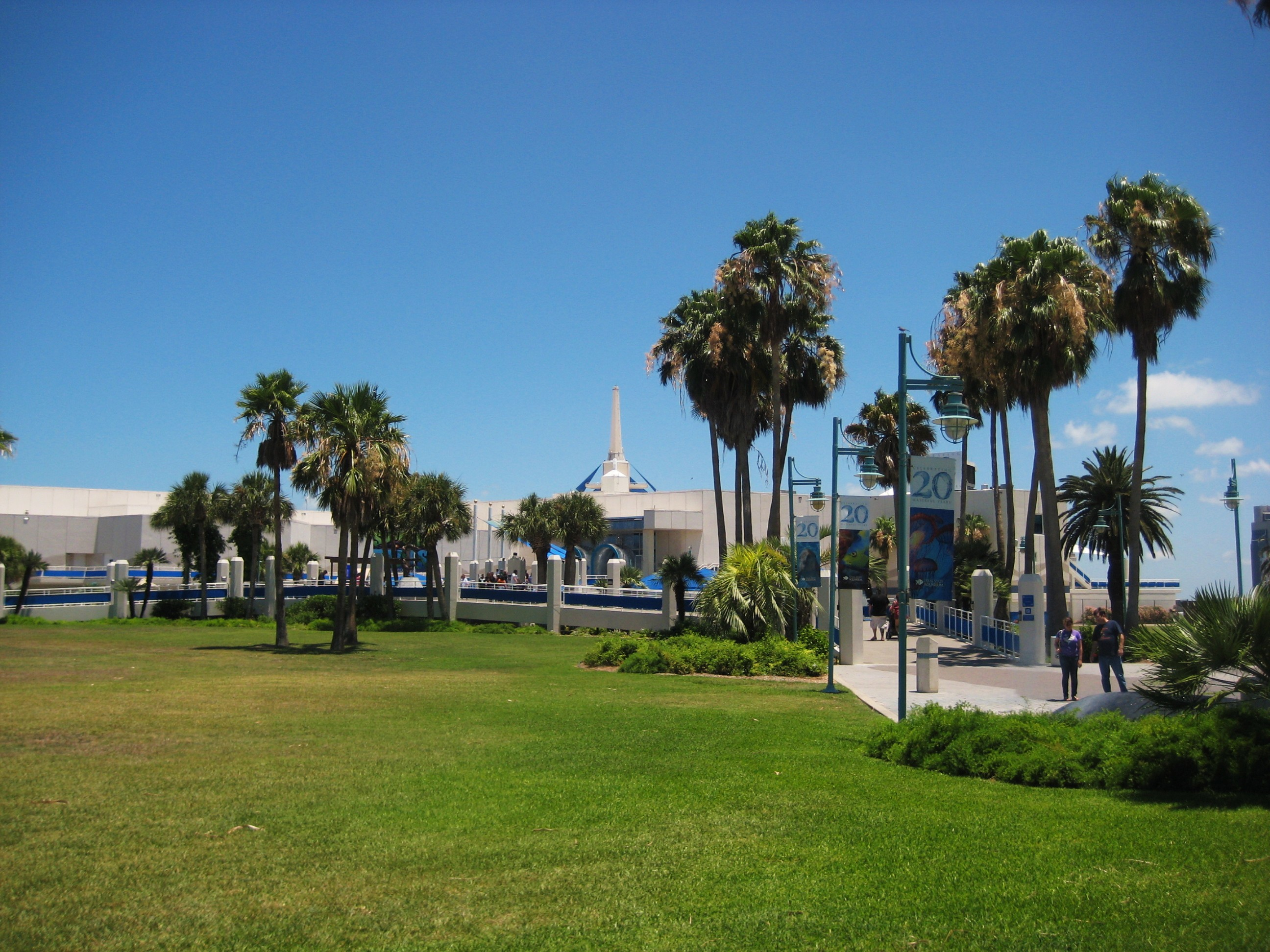
Texas State Aquarium

The Corpus Christi Botanical Gardens and Nature Center, also located in the city, hosts gardening programs from time to time. On Oso Bay near the Pharaoh Valley subdivision, the Hans and Pat Suter Wildlife Refuge is known for seabird-watching. The nearby Pharaohs golf course also serves as a haven for coastal and migratory birds.

Directly east of Corpus Christi are Padre Island and Mustang Island, home to various municipal, state, and national parks, most notably the Padre Island National Seashore. The city is also near King Ranch, one of the world's largest ranches, upon which the movie Giant was based.

Other popular attractions that the residents of Corpus Christi participate in are Buc Days and the First Friday Artwalk.

Buc Days is a festival for all ages, featuring attractions such as the popular Stripes Carnival, rodeos, and nighttime parades. It was originally founded by the non-profit organization, the Buccaneer Commission, in 1938, to introduce fun and cultural experiences to Corpus Christi, as well as to provide educational opportunities to students through the awarding of scholarships since 1996. With 120,000 people recorded attending the Buc Days festival each spring, it's labeled as a known tradition of Corpus Christi.

The First Friday Artwalk is an event that happens on the first Friday of each month in downtown Corpus Christi. Since 2010, the Artwalk has been responsible for helping local businesses gain support and customers, with each event containing an array of over 250 vendors to buy from.

== Sports ==
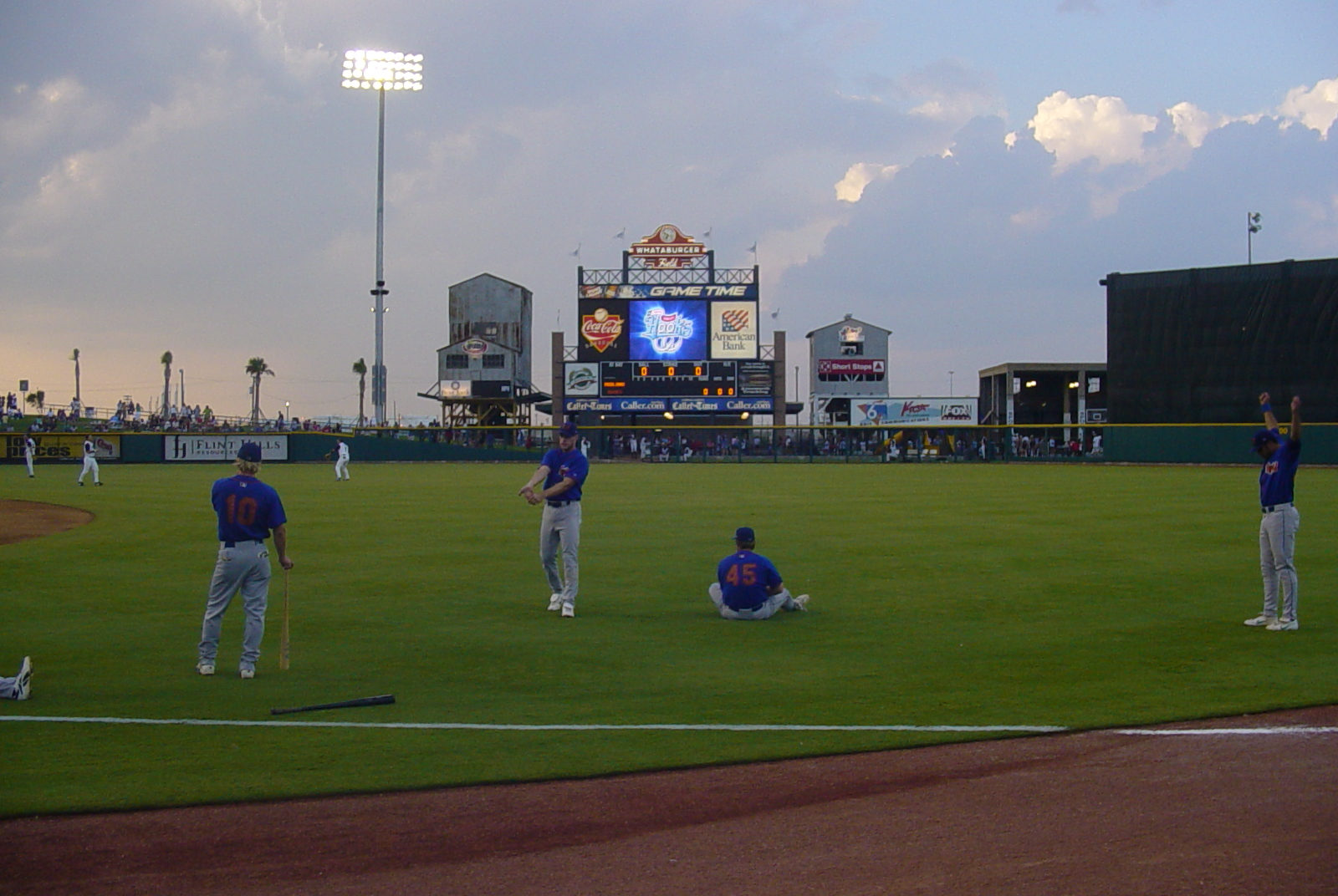
Whataburger Field, home of the Corpus Christi Hooks

Although Corpus Christi has no teams in any of the four major sports leagues of the NFL, NBA, MLB, or NHL, it does have several sports offerings. The city is home to the Corpus Christi IceRays of the North American Hockey League and the Corpus Christi Hooks, of the Texas League, and the AA affiliate of the Houston Astros. The largest venue in Corpus Christi is the 18,000-capacity American football stadium named Buccaneer Stadium.

Year-round NCAA Division I collegiate athletics may be found at Texas A&M-Corpus Christi as the Islanders compete in 14 men's and women's sports as a member of the Southland Conference.

Corpus Christi is also home to the Corpus Christi Rugby Football Club, which is a member of the Texas Rugby Union, an affiliate of the Western Rugby Union and of the United States Rugby Football Union.

In 2017, the United Soccer League expanded to Corpus Christi, forming Corpus Christi FC. They play in the Mid-South Division of the USL League Two.

In 2023, American indoor football expanded to Corpus Christi, forming Corpus Christi Tritons.

| Club | Sport | League | Venue | Established | Championships |
|---|---|---|---|---|---|
| Corpus Christi Hooks | Baseball | Texas League | Whataburger Field | 1968 (relocated in 2005) | 1 (2006) |
| Corpus Christi IceRays | Ice hockey | NAHL | Hilliard Center | 1998 (became junior in 2010) | 0 |
| Corpus Christi Rugby Football Club | Rugby | TRU | Haas Middle School | 1973 | N/A |
| Corpus Christi FC | Soccer | USL1 | Corpus Christi Sports Complex | 2017 | N/A |

== Parks and recreation ==
The city's location beside Corpus Christi Bay, the Gulf of Mexico, and Laguna Madre provides opportunities for water sports and nature tourism. Waterfowl hunting is available in the region for duck, geese, coot, and teal. White-winged dove and mourning dove are also hunted on private leases. The brushland inland from Corpus Christi is also ideal for hunting feral hogs and white-tailed deer.

=== Fishing ===
Fishing is a popular recreational activity in Corpus Christi, including fishing from various piers around Corpus Christi Bay, wade fishing in Oso Bay, and fishing from the Gulf of Mexico at Packery Channel or at Bob Hall Pier.

=== Wind sports ===
The city has one of the highest average wind speeds of coastal cities in North America. This, combined with the Bay Front area located along Ocean Drive, makes the city an important destination for wind sports such as kite boarding, wind surfing, kite flying, wing foiling, and sailing. In 1990, Corpus Christi hosted the Windsurfing World Championships. In 2018, Corpus Christi hosted the 2018 Youth Sailing World Championships, and in 2022, the J/24 World Championship.

=== Skating ===
The Corpus Christi Skate Park opened on February 17, 2007. It is located in Cole Park on the shoreline of the Corpus Christi Bay near downtown. The 12,000-square-foot (1,100 m^{2}) concrete park includes a skating bowl and a street course with stairs, railings, and flat surfaces.

=== Birdwatching ===
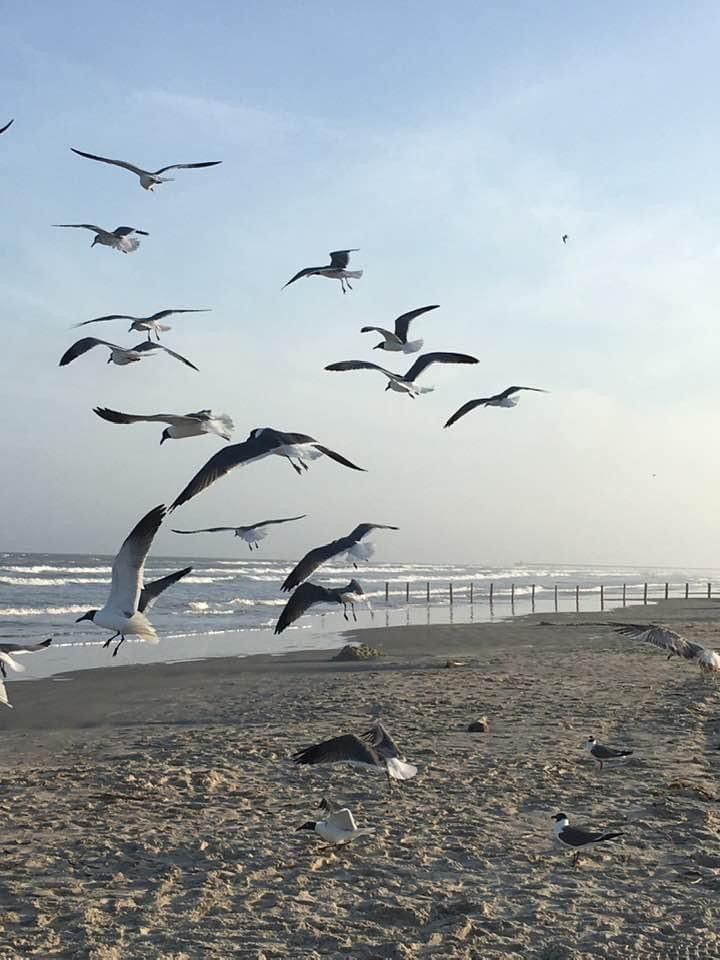
Seagulls at the Corpus Christi coast

Being a coastal city, Corpus Christi is a good spot for seabird watching. Popular spots include Blucher Park in downtown, the Hans and Pat Suter Wildlife Refuge along Oso Bay, Hazel Bazemore County Park along the Nueces River in Calallen, and the South Texas Botanic Garden and Nature Center along the Oso Creek.

The Audubon Outdoor Club of Corpus Christi, founded in 1957, promotes birding culture and protects habitat for birds in the Coastal Bend region of Texas, with five sanctuaries owned or managed by the club within Corpus Christi. The club hosts field trips and public meetings monthly.

== Government ==
=== Municipal government ===
In 1852, the City of Corpus Christi was incorporated. Texas' 31st Legislature chartered the city as a political and corporate municipal entity in 1909. By ordinance, the city possesses power to "fix, alter and extend its boundaries."

Corpus Christi is under a council-manager municipal government. The elected city council is the primary authority in municipal matters such as enacting local legislation, determining policies, and appointing the city manager. Together, the city council and city manager execute laws and administer the municipal government. Organized by governmental sectors of city council, city management, city secretary, and several city departments, Corpus Christi is seated in Nueces County.

Peter Zanoni, former deputy city manager of San Antonio, was appointed city manager in May 2019

The Corpus Christi City Charter was adopted by public referendum in 1987, with amendments to the entire charter conducted on January 19, 1991, and April 3, 1993. Further revisions to the charter were conducted on November 2, 2004, November 7, 2006, and November 8, 2016. The charter consists of 10 articles and 41 sections regarding stipulations of home rule government, city council and city manager procedures, administration, planning, boards and commissions, etc. The Code of Ordinances of Corpus Christi was codified through Ordinance No. 028493, and adopted on February 23, 2010.

Mayor

From 2012 to 2016, Nelda Martinez was mayor of Corpus Christi, the first Hispanic woman to the hold the office. On January 19, 2017, Corpus Christi Mayor Dan McQueen resigned from office after 37 days after controversy over statements he made regarding his qualifications and those of city council members.

The current mayor of Corpus Christi and current member of city council is Paulette M. Guajardo, who was originally elected in 2022 for a two year term. She was re-elected in 2024 and continues to serve as the 60th mayor of Corpus Christi. Her duties include gathering over council meetings and official city ceremonies. Corpus Christi is represented by Mayor Guajardo at state, national, and international levels.

=== State and federal representation ===
The Texas 13th Court of Appeals is located in the Nueces County Courthouse in Corpus Christi.

The Texas Department of Criminal Justice operates the Corpus Christi Parole Office in Corpus Christi.

The United States Postal Service operates the Corpus Christi Post Office, the city's main post office, and several station post offices.

== Education ==
=== Colleges and universities ===
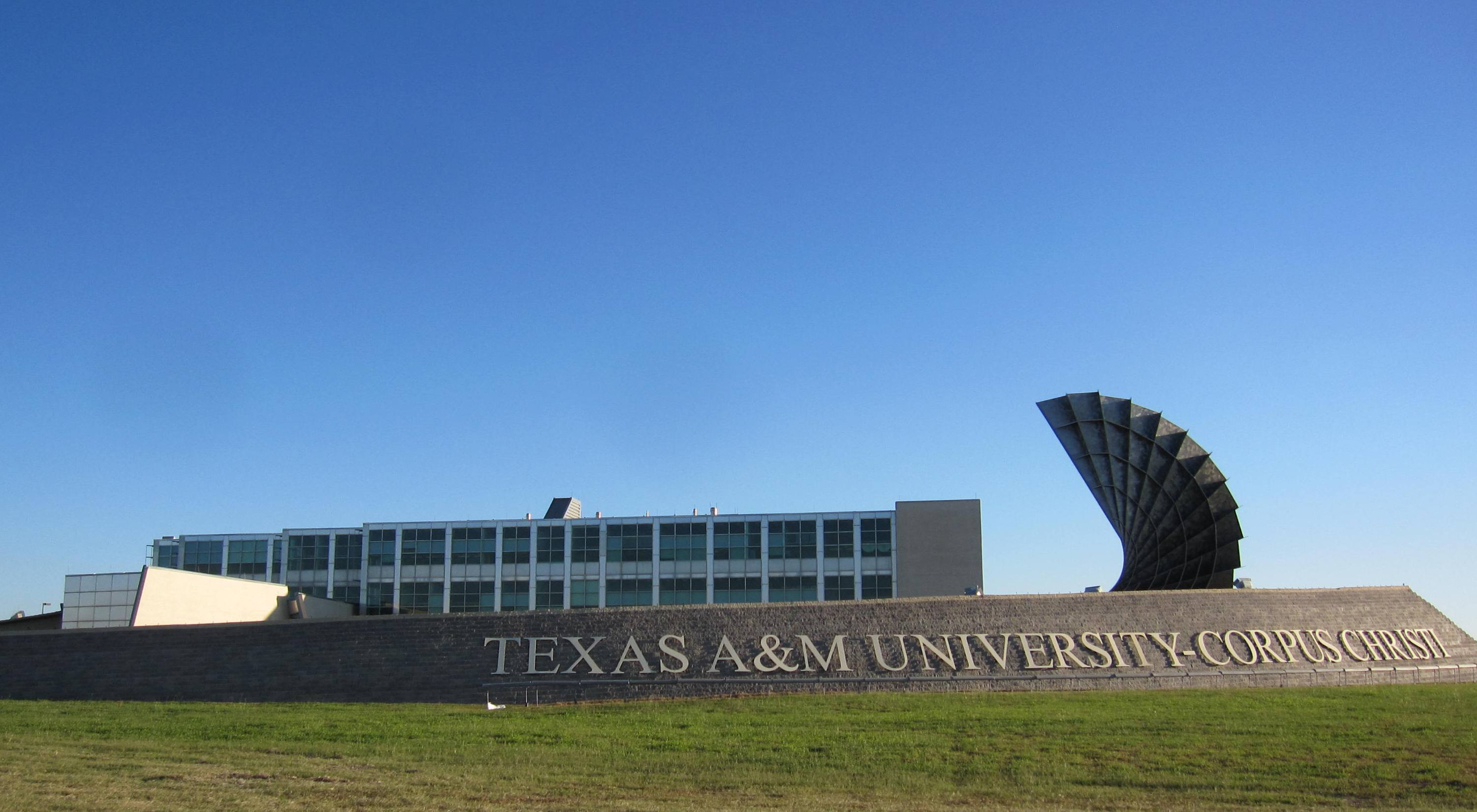
Texas A&M University–Corpus Christi (TAMUCC)

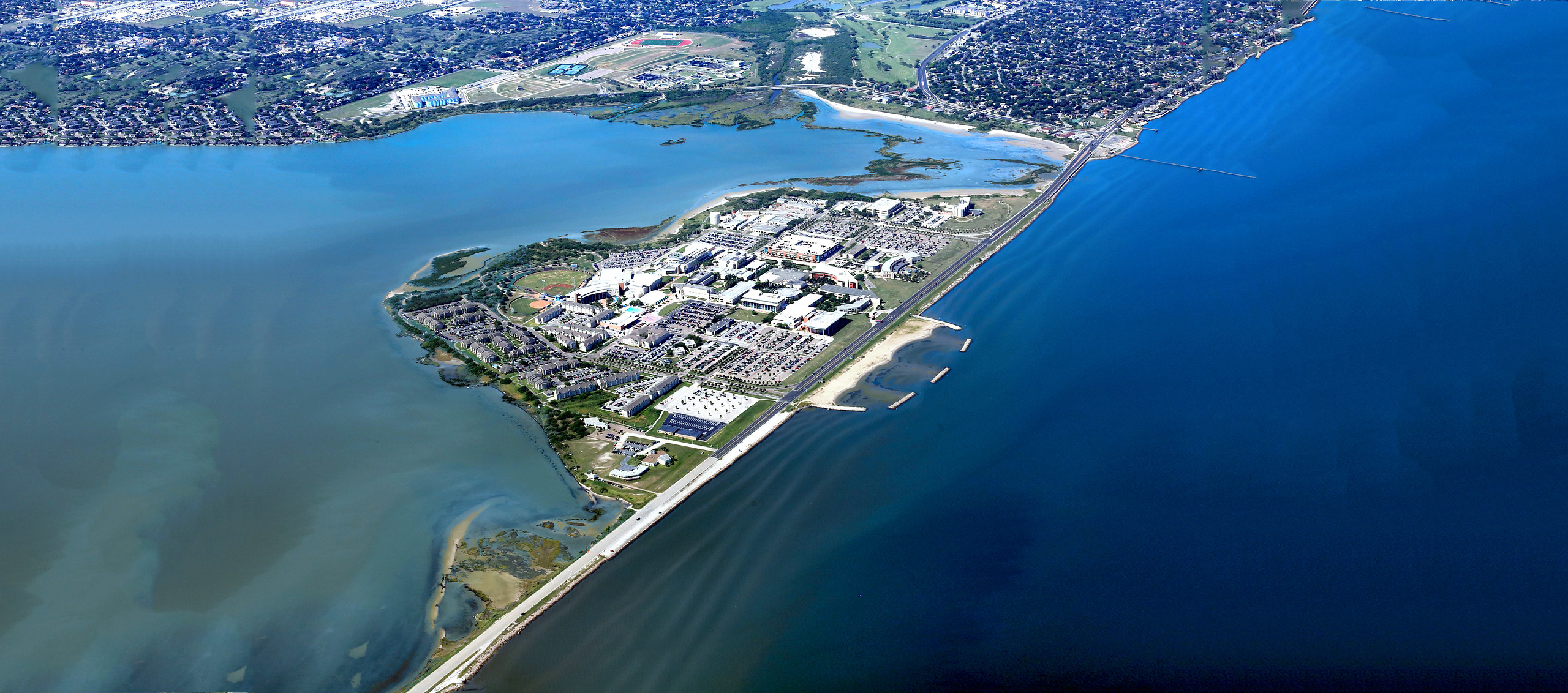
TAMUCC's island campus

Corpus Christi is home to several institutions of higher learning: Texas A&M University-Corpus Christi, Del Mar College, Saint Leo University-Corpus Christi, and numerous vocational schools, including Southern Careers Institute, South Texas Vo-Tech, Career Centers of Texas-Corpus Christi, and Vogue Cosmetology School. The city is also home to Stark College and Seminary (formerly known as the South Texas School of Christian Studies), located on Ward Island alongside Texas A&M-Corpus Christi.

Texas A&M University-Corpus Christi is a component of the Texas A&M University System. It was formerly known as Corpus Christi State University, Texas A&I University at Corpus Christi, and the University of Corpus Christi.

Saint Leo University-Corpus Christi Education Center is located at Corpus Christi's Naval Air Station.

Del Mar College is a local community college designated for the entire Corpus Christi city limits. It began in the 1940s at a location behind Wynn Seale Jr. High School. The main campus began with the administration building, which was constructed after World War II on Del Mar. The college grew to encompass a good portion of a residential addition called Southmoreland built from the Bohemian farmlands in the late 1930s. Del Mar now includes a west campus located in the area of Corpus Christi that once was Cliff Maus Airport. Del Mar College is expanding their footprint with the unveiling of their new Southside Campus near Oso Creek. The new Southern branch campus will serve the recent growing Southside area.

Southern Careers Institute offers career training at two Corpus Christi locations, primarily in the medical, business, and cosmetology fields.

To improve literacy levels in the city, a multiyear effort has been made to promote reading through annual literacy festivals. Started by First Lady Laura Bush and the Texas Book Festival, a series of book festivals is held each spring.

=== Schools ===
Seven school districts provide primary and secondary education for residents of the city limits, within Nueces County:

- Corpus Christi ISD
- Calallen ISD
- Flour Bluff ISD
- London ISD
- Port Aransas ISD
- Tuloso-Midway ISD
- West Oso ISD

The portion of Corpus Christi in Kleberg County is within the Riviera Independent School District. The portion in San Patricio County is in the Ingleside Independent School District.

The Roman Catholic Diocese of Corpus Christi provides the primary and secondary education for Catholic schools. Several open-enrollment charter schools are in Corpus Christi. These public schools are Accelerated Learning Center, Cesar E Chavez Academy, Corpus Christi College Preparatory HS, Corpus Christi Montessori School, Dr ML Garza-Gonzalez Charter School, GCCLR Institute of Technology, Premier HS of Corpus Christi, Richard Milburn Academy, School of Science and Technology, Seashore Learning Center, and Seashore Middle Academy.

=== Corpus Christi Independent School District ===
High schools

- Branch Academy for Career and Technical Education
- Collegiate High School
- Foy H. Moody High School Health Science Academy
- Mary Carroll High School
- Richard King High School
- Roy Miller High School
- School of Science and Technology College Prep High School
- Solomon Coles High School
- Veterans Memorial High School
- W. B. Ray High School

Middle schools

- Carl O. Hamlin Middle School
- Claude Cunningham Middle School
- Cullen Place Middle School
- Elliott Grant Middle School
- Harold Kaffie Middle School
- Martin Middle School
- Marvin P. Baker Middle School
- R. Haas Middle School
- Robert Driscoll Middle School
- South Park Middle School
- Tom Browne Middle School
- Wynn Seale Academy of Fine Arts Magnet Middle School

Elementary schools

- Allen Elementary School
- Barnes Elementary School
- Berlanga Elementary School
- Calk Elementary School
- Club Estates Elementary School
- Crockett Elementary School
- Dawson Elementary School
- Early Childhood Development Center
- Evans Elementary School
- Fannin Elementary School
- Galvan Elementary School
- Garcia Elementary School
- Gibson Elementary School
- Hicks Elementary School
- Houston Elementary School
- Jones Elementary School
- Kolda Elementary School
- Kostoryz Elementary School
- Los Encinos SES Elementary School
- Meadowbrook Elementary School
- Menger Elementary School
- Metropolitan Elementary School of Design
- Mireles Elementary School
- Montclair Elementary School
- Moore Elementary School
- Oak Park Elementary School
- Sanders Elementary School
- Schanen Estates Elementary School
- Shaw Elementary School
- Smith Elementary School
- Travis Elementary School
- Webb Elementary School
- Wilson Elementary School
- Windsor Park Elementary School
- Woodlawn Elementary School
- Yeager Elementary School
- Zavala Elementary School

Alternative

- Mary Grett School
- Student Learning and Guidance Center

=== Flour Bluff Independent School District ===
- Flour Bluff High School, grades 9–12
- Flour Bluff Jr. High School, grades 7–8
- Flour Bluff Intermediate School, grades 5–6
- Flour Bluff Elementary School, grades 3–4
- Flour Bluff Primary School, grades 1–2
- Early Childhood Center, prekindergarten and kindergarten
- Head Start, ages 1–4

=== West Oso Independent School District ===
- West Oso High School, grades 9–12
- West Oso Junior High School, grades 6–8
- West Oso Elementary, grades 2–5
- West Oso John F. Kennedy Elementary, prekindergarten to grade 1

=== Tuloso-Midway Independent School District ===
- Tuloso-Midway High School
- Tuloso-Midway Middle School
- Tuloso-Midway Intermediate School
- Tuloso-Midway Primary School
- Tuloso-Midway Academic Career Center

=== Calallen Independent School District ===
- Calallen High School
- Calallen Middle School
- West Intermediate School, grades 4–5
- East Primary School, grades pre-K–3
- Wood River Primary School, grades pre-K–3

=== London Independent School District ===
- London High School
- London Middle School
- London Elementary School

=== Private/charter/other ===
- St. John Paul II Academy, 6–12
- St. James Episcopal, primary, K–8
- Corpus Christi Montessori School, grades 1–8
- Incarnate Word Academy, K–12
- Annapolis Christian Academy, K–12
- Yorktown Christian Academy, K–12

=== Libraries ===
Libraries in the city include:

- Dr. Clotilde P. Garcia
- Ben F. McDonald
- Janet F. Harte
- La Retama
- Owen R.Hopkins
- Anita and W.T. Neyland

== Infrastructure ==
=== Transportation ===
Corpus Christi is served by Corpus Christi International Airport and Interstate 37. Interstate 69E/U.S. Highway 77 connects the city to Brownsville and Victoria. Texas State Highway 44 is a main thoroughfare that connects Corpus Christi to Laredo and the western part of South Texas by way of Interstate 69W/U.S. Highway 59, Interstate 35, and U.S. Highway 83. The inner-city public transportation is provided by Corpus Christi Regional Transportation Authority with its 28 bus routes. Corpus Christi had a streetcar system functioning from 1910 to 1931 and a railway station (passenger service ended in 1965). Despite the convenience of a large harbor, the city does not have a passenger port. The city of Corpus Christi has a lower than average percentage of households without a car. In 2015, 8.5% of Corpus Christi households lacked a car, which decreased to 7.9% in 2016. The national average was 8.7% in 2016. Corpus Christi averaged 1.77 cars per household in 2016, compared to a national average of 1.8.

The city is accessed by two major bridges, the New Harbor Bridge (US 181) and the John F. Kennedy Memorial Causeway (PR 22). Both bridges are maintained by the Texas Department of Transportation.

=== Major highways ===
- I-37
- Future I-69E / US 77
- US 181
- SH 35
- SH 44
- SH 286 (Crosstown Expressway)
- SH 357
- SH 358 (Padre Island Drive)
- SH 361

== Notable people ==
- Kevin Abstract, musician, founding member of Brockhampton
- Amy Acuff, five-time Olympic high jumper
- Mike Adams, former MLB pitcher
- Jimmy Akin, Catholic podcast host
- A.A. Allen, Pentecostal evangelist and "faith healer", pastored an Assemblies of God church in Corpus Christi in the late 1940s
- Devon Allman, musician
- Marshall Applewhite, founder of the Heaven's Gate suicide cult, graduated from Corpus Christi High School
- Rick Baldwin, NASCAR driver
- Barbara Barrie, actress
- Raymond Berry, wide receiver and coach, Pro Football Hall of Famer
- Phil Blackmar, golfer, three-time winner on the PGA Tour and single win on the Champions Tour
- Justin Brantly, NFL punter
- John A. Brieden, American Legion commander
- Tammie Brown, drag queen and musician
- Johnny Canales, TV host
- e.E. Charlton-Trujillo, author, filmmaker, and youth literacy activist
- Dabney Coleman, actor
- Roger Creager, country music singer-songwriter
- Henry Cuesta, clarinetist on The Lawrence Welk Show
- Dave Davies, broadcaster and contributor to NPR's Fresh Air program
- Paula DeAnda, musician
- Tom DeLay, former U.S. congressman and House majority leader
- Carlos DeLuna, executed for murder, controversial conviction causing concerns about wrongful executions
- Iann Dior, singer, rapper, and songwriter
- Helen Donath, opera singer
- Ramón H. Dovalina, college administrator and president
- Roberto Elizondo, boxer, two-time world title challenger
- Blake Farenthold, former U.S. congressman from Texas's 27th congressional district
- Frances Farenthold, member, Texas House of Representatives (1969–1973), activist, educator
- Farrah Fawcett, actress and artist
- Joe Bertram Frantz, historian
- David Freese, MLB player for the Pittsburgh Pirates
- Albert Lee Giddens, Texas trial lawyer
- Vicente Gonzalez, U.S. representative for Texas
- Clint Gresham, Seattle Seahawks long snapper, Super Bowl champion
- Stephanie Griest, author
- Steven A. Hickham Jr., racing driver
- Burt Hooton, baseball pitcher, All-Star and World Series champion
- Randolph W. House, US Army lieutenant general, born in Corpus Christi
- Todd Ames Hunter, member, Texas House of Representatives, 1989–1997 and since January 2009
- Ernestine Jackson, actress and singer
- Bret Anthony Johnston, author of Corpus Christi: Stories
- Jeremy Jordan, actor, Supergirl, Joyful Noise; Broadway performer
- Jeff Kanipe, author and astronomer
- Larry Kelm, NFL player, an original member of the Texas A & M "Wrecking Crew", linebacker for the Los Angeles Rams and the San Francisco 49ers
- Ashley Kidd, world champion wakesurfer
- Brooks Kieschnick, baseball player
- Bobby Labonte, Hall of Fame NASCAR driver, and 2000 Cup Series champion
- Terry Labonte, Hall of Fame NASCAR driver, and 1984 and 1996 Cup Series champion
- Colleen LaRose, indicted in 2010 for trying to recruit Islamic terrorists to wage jihad
- Chris Layton, drummer for Stevie Ray Vaughan and Double Trouble
- Brian Leetch, NHL defenseman, born in Corpus Christi, but grew up in Connecticut
- Danny Lohner, musician
- Eva Longoria, actress (Desperate Housewives)
- Allen Ludden, TV game show host
- Irlene Mandrell, musician, actress, model, and sister of Barbara and Louise Mandrell
- Louise Mandrell, singer and entertainer, sister of Barbara and Irlene Mandrell
- Kathryn Leigh McGuire, activist, businessperson and socialite
- Terrence McNally, playwright
- Victoria Moroles, actress
- Mitch Morris, actor
- Roger Narvaez, mixed martial artist
- Larry Norman, musician and songwriter
- Todd Oldham, fashion designer
- Revilo P. Oliver, professor and founder of the John Birch Society
- Solomon P. Ortiz, U.S. congressman, represented Corpus Christi for 28 years
- Joseph D. Patch, U.S. Army major general
- Jessie Pavelka, actor and model
- Jennifer Peña, Latin pop and Tejano singer and actress
- Cliff Pennington, MLB player for the Los Angeles Angels
- Paul Peress, drummer, composer, producer
- Lou Diamond Phillips, actor
- Billy Powell, former keyboardist of Lynyrd Skynyrd
- A.B. Quintanilla III, producer, songwriter, bassist, "King of Kumbia" (or "King of Cumbia"), with Selena y Los Dinos, Kumbia Kings and Kumbia All Starz, Selena's older brother
- Suzette Quintanilla, drummer for Selena y Los Dinos, Selena's older sister
- Selena, Mexican-American Tejano singer, "Queen of Tejano Music", with Selena y Los Dinos
- The Reverend Horton Heat
- Dody Roach, professional poker player, two-time World Series of Poker bracelet winner
- Johnny Roland, NFL player and coach
- Lester Roloff, radio evangelist
- Leslie Sanchez, political pundit
- Pepe Serna, actor
- Sid Sheinberg, ex-president of Universal Studios, helped make Jaws
- Bart Shirley, MLB player for the Los Angeles Dodgers and the New York Mets
- Ormond R. Simpson, lieutenant general in the Marine Corps
- Robert Simpson, meteorologist and hurricane specialist
- Lori Singer, actress
- Marc Singer, actor
- Justin Storms, artist, musician
- Martha Tilton, singer and actress
- Raul Torres, state representative from Nueces County
- Jose Trevino, MLB player for the New York Yankees and the Cincinnati Reds
- Carlos Truan, politician
- George Conrad Westervelt, naval officer and engineer; co-founder of the Boeing Company
- William I. Westervelt, US Army brigadier general
- April Wilkerson, maker, YouTube content creator, television personality
- Don Williams, country and western singer
- Jillian Williams, sitting volleyball player
- Rob Zastryzny, pitcher for the Chicago Cubs

== Sister cities ==
Corpus Christi keeps a thriving and active relationship with these sister cities:

- Agen, Lot-et-Garonne, France
- Keelung, Taiwan
- Yokosuka, Kanagawa, Japan
- Taguig, Philippines
- Veracruz, Veracruz, Mexico

== See also ==
- Corpus Christi Museum of Science and History
- Kingsville Naval Auxiliary Fields
- List of mayors of Corpus Christi, Texas
- Mirador de la Flor
- Nueces Hotel
- Old Bayview Cemetery
- Oso Creek
- Parkdale Plaza
- Port of Corpus Christi
- South Texas Botanical Gardens & Nature Center
- Texas State Aquarium
- Christus Spohn Health System
