= Flour Bluff Independent School District =

School district in Texas, United States

Address
- 2505 Waldron Road Corpus Christi, Texas, 78418; United States

District information
- Type: Public
- Grades: PreK–12
- NCES District ID: 4819380

Students and staff
- Students: 5,553 (2020–2021)
- Teachers: 360.66 (on an FTE basis)
- Staff: 366.81 (on an FTE basis)
- Student–teacher ratio: 15.4:1

Other information
- Website: flourbluffschools.net

Flour Bluff Independent School District is a public school district based in Corpus Christi, Texas (USA).

The district serves the Flour Bluff area of Corpus Christi as well as high school students from the London Independent School District.

In 2009, the school district was rated "Recognized" by the Texas Education Agency.

== Schools ==
- Flour Bluff High School (Grades 9-12)
- Flour Bluff Junior High School (Grades 7-8)
- Flour Bluff Intermediate School (Grades 5-6)
- Flour Bluff Elementary School (Grades 3-4)
- Flour Bluff Primary School (Grades 1-2)
- Flour Bluff Early Childhood Center (Grades PK-K)
