= Kathryn Leigh McGuire =

Kathryn Leigh McGuire (November 26, 1941 – February 2, 2011) was an activist, businessperson and socialite in Houston. She was the first out and open transgender person to run for city council in Houston.

== Biography ==
McGuire was born Charles Royce McGuire Jr. in 1941 in Corpus Christi, Texas. Around the age of 21 she married, eventually moving to Houston and starting a construction company. After an investigation into her construction company, she divorced and began her transition by taking female hormone pills and having minor facial surgery. She had gender reassignment surgery in London in 1992, and later moved to Prague.

In 1989, as Charles R. MaGuire, she ran unsuccessfully for the City Council of Houston as a self-described transvestite. During this campaign the American television program A Current Affair ran a segment on McGuire and the contradictions and difficulties she had as a "cross-dressing" candidate. Her transition was filmed for a PBS documentary. The Last Days of Charles/Kathryn McGuire. Her son, James, wrote a play about her, Daddy Kathryn, which ran at the theater HERE in New York.

McGuire was regularly featured in Houston newspapers and magazines. She died in 2011.
