= Flour Bluff High School =

Coordinates: 27.6447°N 97.2965°W

- 2505 Waldron Road; Corpus Christi, Texas; Nueces County, Texas; United States

Information
- Type: Public
- Established: 1967
- School district: Flour Bluff Independent School District
- Principal: Amy Seeds
- Teaching staff: 131.12(on FTE basis)
- Grades: 9–12
- Enrollment: 1,940 (2025-2026)
- Student to teacher ratio: 14.80
- Colors: Maroon & White
- Slogan: Class, Pride, Heart (CPH)
- Athletics conference: UIL Class AAAAA
- Mascot: Hornet
- Nickname: FBHS, The Bluff
- Team name: Hornets
- Website: Flour Bluff High School

Flour Bluff High School is a public high school in Corpus Christi, Texas (USA). It is part of the Flour Bluff Independent School District.

The Texas Education Agency's 2009 accountability rating was "Recognized"

== Student demographics ==
As of the 2025–2026 school year, Flour Bluff High had a total of 1,940 students (43.81% White, 46.29% Hispanic, 2.11% African American, 1.86% Asian, 0.46% Pacific Islander, 0.36% Native American, and 5.10% of Mixed Race).

== Facility ==
- Opened in 1967
- New additions and renovations completed in 1999
- 91 Classrooms
- Cafetorium (900 capacity)
- Teaching Theater (150 capacity)
- Auditorium (1325 capacity)
- 2 Gymnasiums
- Library
- Football Field
- Running Track
- Multi-Purpose Facility
- Indoor Football Facility
- Natatorium
- Baseball/Softball Fields
- ROTC Pavilion

== Extra-curricular activities ==
The Navy Junior Reserve Officers' Training Corps cadets have, as of 2019, won the high school military drill team national championships for 27 years, and as of 2013, the Area 10 Navy championship 19 consecutive times

The Academic Decathlon team has, as of 2006, gone on to the state competition twelve times.

Flour Bluff High School came under fire in 2011 in a scandal that received national attention, due to the district's initial refusal to allow students to form a GSA (Gay-Straight Alliance) on campus, despite allowing FCA (Fellowship of Christian Athletes) factions in their high school and junior high. (FBISD initially denied the formation of the GSA due to the fact that it was a 'non-curricular' club. When it was pointed out that the FCA and other clubs were also non-curricular, and still allowed to meet on campus, all clubs were briefly suspended. Due to parent and student outrage, several clubs were reinstated.) This refusal was found to contradict the First Amendment, as well as the Equal Access Act.

In Spring 2011, a petition was circulated to allow the formation of the GSA. The ACLU (American Civil Liberties Union) sent a letter to Superintendent Carbajal on March 2, 2011, requesting the formation of the club be allowed.

It was eventually decided that the GSA be allowed to form, and meet on campus.

== Athletics ==
The Flour Bluff Hornets compete in these sports –

Cross Country, Volleyball, Football, Basketball, Swimming/Diving, Soccer, Golf, Tennis, Track, Softball & Baseball.

For Football, Flour Bluff competes in 5A Division 1.

=== State Titles ===
- Volleyball
  - 2024(5A/D1)

== Notable alumni ==
- Lou Diamond Phillips, actor.
