= Corpus Christi Regional Transportation Authority =

Public transportation operator in Texas, US

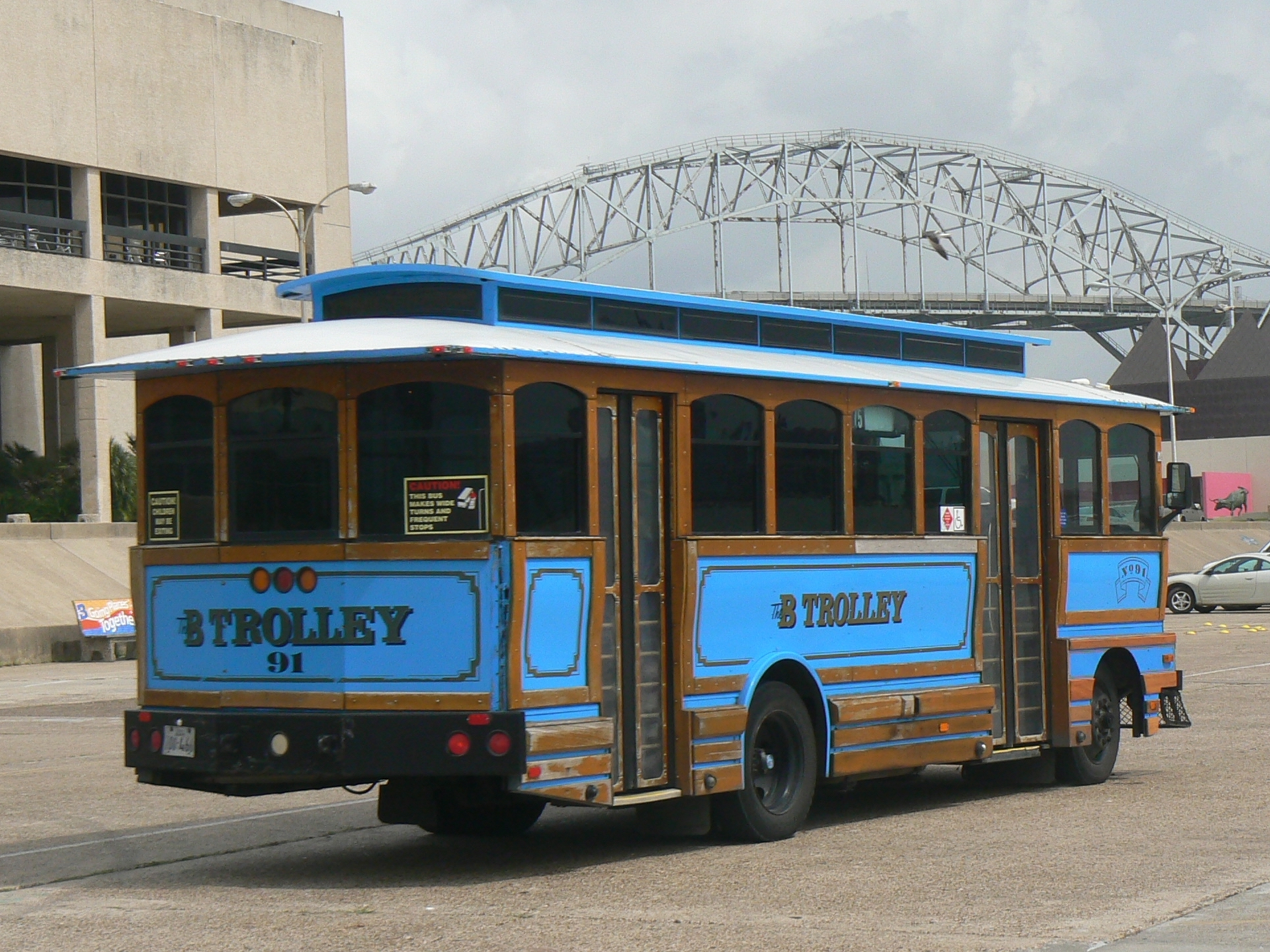
- A CCRTA Trolley at CCRTA Headquarters
- Founded: 1985
- Headquarters: 5658 Bear Lane
- Locale: Corpus Christi, Texas
- Service area: Nueces County, Texas
- Service type: bus, paratransit
- Routes: 35
- Stops: 1338
- Destinations: Corpus Christi, Padre Island, Robstown, Gregory, Port Aransas
- Hubs: Staples Street Station, Port Ayers Station, Southside Station
- Stations: Port Ayers Station, Southside Station, Staples Street Station, Robstown Station, Callalen Park and Ride, and Compton @ Waldon (flour bluff terminus)
- Fleet: Gillig Low Floor Advantage, Gillig Low Floor BRT, Ford E450, Gillig Low Floor Trolley, Orion VII
- Annual ridership: 5,367,081
- Fuel type: Diesel/CNG
- Chief executive: Derrick Majchszak
- Website: ccrta.org

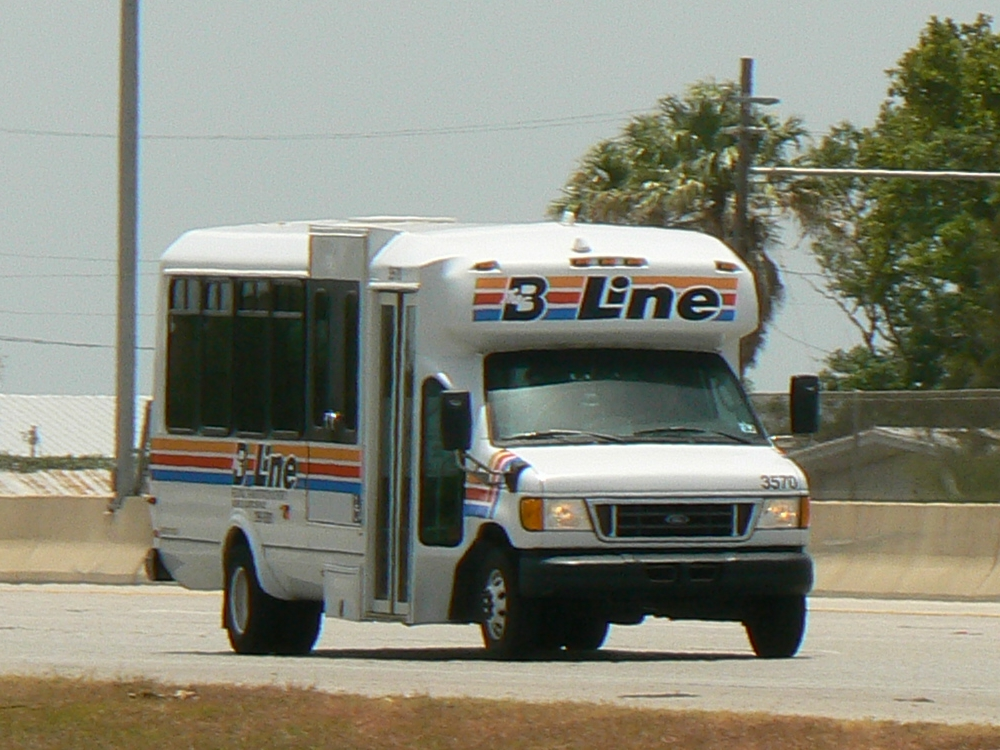
B-Line paratransit service

The Corpus Christi Regional Transportation Authority is the operator of public transportation in Nueces County, Texas. Twenty-eight local routes are offered, plus Six peak hour express offerings. A seasonal express route is also provided to Padre Island beaches and two year-round shuttles in Downtown Corpus Christi in Port Aransas. These shuttles use buses designed to look like trolleys and the #94 Port Aransas travels along the beach for some of its journey. The CCRTA also operates 4 routes out of Robstown Station, as well as 3 (temporarily 2) routes in Gregory, Texas.

== Route list ==
Corpus Christi RTA provides 32 scheduled bus routes.

- 3 NAS Shuttle (Created October 5, 2014 as a split from Route 5)
- 4 Flour Bluff
- 5 Alameda
- 6 Santa Fe/Malls
- 12 Hillcrest/Baldwin (Formerly 12 Saxet/Oak Park)
- 15 Kostoryz (Formerly 15 Ayers)
- 16 Morgan/Port
- 17 Carroll/Southside
- 19 Ayers (Formerly 19 Ayers/Norton)
- 21 Arboleda
- 23 Molina
- 25 Gollihar/Greenwood (Created June 2, 2014 as a renumbering of part of 24 restricting 24 to Sunday Service)
- 26 Airline/Lipes Connector
- 27 Leopard (formerly 27 Robstown Northwest)
- 27X Leopard (Express variant of 27, runs during peak hours only)
- 28 Leopard/Omaha (Created January 23, 2017)
- 29 Staples
- 30 Westside/Health Clinic (Created January 23, 2017)
- 32 Southside
- 34 Robstown North (Created January 23, 2017 from part of 34 Robstown)
- 35 Robstown South (Created January 23, 2017 from part of 34 Robstown)
- 37 Crosstown
- 50 Calallen Park & Ride/NAS Express
- 51 Gregory Park & Ride/NAS Express
- 53 Robstown Park & Ride/NAS Express
- 54 Gregory/Downtown Express (Created January 23, 2017)
- 56 Flour Bluff/Downtown Express (Created January 23, 2017)
- 60 Islander Shuttle (Created October 5, 2014)
- 65 Padre Island Connection
- 76 Harbor Bridge Shuttle (Discontinued September 6, 2004 (as 76 CC Beach Shuttle); restored Winter 2009-2010 and Non-Sunday seasonal service discontinued November 27, 2011)
- 78 North Beach
- 83 Advanced Industries (Created October 5, 2014)
- 93 FLEX (Pilot) (replaced Route 63 The Wave on August 21, 2019)
- 94 Port Aransas Shuttle
- 95 Port Aransas Express (Created May 24, 2019)

=== Former Routes ===
- 2 Hillcrest (merged with Route 12 in Summer 2009)
- 8 Flour Bluff/Malls (replaced by new Route 29F on June 2, 2014 and reduced to Sundays; remainder replaced by Routes 4 and 29 on September 10, 2018 as part of Fleet Forward)
- 22 Saratoga (Port Ayers Station to Southside Station via John Paul High School; discontinued Winter 2012-2013)
- 24 Los Encinos/Kostoryz (replaced by new Routes 19G and 25 June 2, 2014 and restricted to Sunday Service; remainder replaced by Routes 15, 19, and 25 on September 10, 2018 as part of Fleet Forward)
- 31 McCardle/Malls (replaced by new Route 19M on June 2, 2014)
- 34 Robstown (Split into Routes 34 and 35 on January 23, 2017)
- 55 Gregory (Created October 5, 2014, service temporarily suspended)
- 63 The Wave (replaced by new Route 93 FLEX on August 21, 2019)
- 66 TAMU at Corpus Christi Connector (replaced by Route 37 on September 10, 2018 as part of Fleet Forward)
- 67 Bishop/Driscoll/Gregory (Discontinued on January 23, 2017 in favor of the new Route 54)
- 68 Agua Dulce/Banquete (Discontinued Winter 2012-2013)
- 73 McGee Beach (Discontinued in 2010-2011)
- 75 Bayfront Connector (Discontinued in 2010-2011)
- 77 Harbor Ferry (Discontinued Labor Day 2006; restored March 12, 2011 and discontinued November 27, 2011)
- 79 Downtown Shuttle (Discontinued June 2, 2014)
- 81 Padre Island Beach Express (Created January 23, 2017 (summer only); discontinued on September 10, 2018 as part of Fleet Forward)
- 84 Lighthouse (Created October 5, 2014) (Discontinued December 5, 2017)
- 99 Ferry Shuttle (Discontinued September 3, 2018)
- 354 Southside Express (Created in Winter 2009-2010; discontinued in 2010-2011)
