= Stephanie Griest =

Stephanie Elizondo Griest
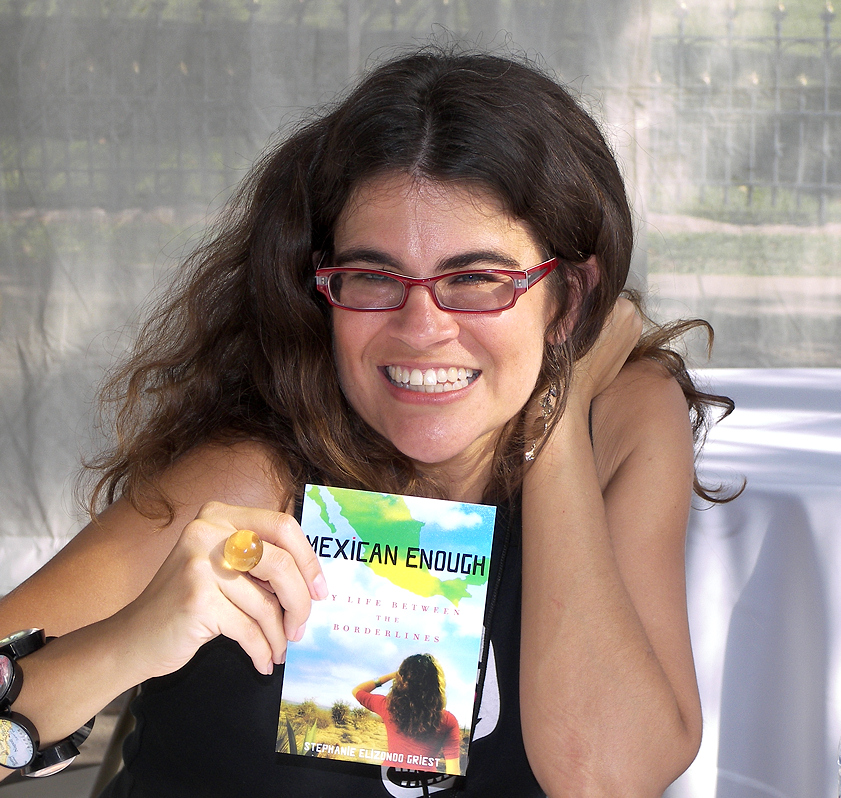
- Stephanie Elizondo Griest at the 2008 Texas Book Festival
- Born: June 6, 1974 (age 50); Corpus Christi, Texas
- Occupation(s): Author, Traveling Journalist, College Professor at University of North Carolina

Stephanie Elizondo Griest (born June 6, 1974) is a Chicana author and activist from South Texas.

== Works ==
Her books include Around the Bloc: My Life in Moscow, Beijing, and Havana (Villard/Random House, 2004), 100 Places Every Woman Should Go (Travelers' Tales, 2007), and Mexican Enough: My Life Between the Borderlines (Washington Square Press/Simon & Schuster, 2008). She has also written for the New York Times, Washington Post, Latina Magazine, and numerous Travelers' Tales anthologies.

== Life ==
Born and raised in Corpus Christi, Texas, Griest began speaking about wanting to travel in her high school years. Griest has a degree in journalism and speaks Russian. She traveled to Moscow while learning Russian, creating a rulebook for traveling across Russia. She has added to Chicano studies by her form of travel writing, exploring how Mexican culture can be affected in a border region. She has made relevant contributions as she grew up in American culture in Texas, resulting in being heavily influenced by Mexican culture. Specifically, this influence came from family and friends who resisted assimilation of the Mexican culture. In Griest's Mexican Enough, she explores her cultural differences. She does interviews with people about issues of assimilation and how they choose to keep their cultural identity roots as they search for self-assurance in their society.

Over her career, Griest has explored 29 countries. On one occasion, she spent a year driving 45,000 miles across the United States, documenting its history for a youth-oriented website called The Odyssey. A 2005 Hodder Fellow at Princeton University, she is currently a Senior Fellow at the World Policy Institute and a Board Member of the National Coalition Against Censorship. She won the 2007 Richard Margolis Award for Social Justice Reporting for her work on Mexico.
