= Tuloso-Midway Independent School District =

School district in Texas, United States

Address
- 9760 La Branch Corpus Christi, Texas, 78460; United States

District information
- Grades: PK–12
- Schools: 5
- NCES District ID: 4843350

Students and staff
- Students: 3,636 (2023–2024)
- Teachers: 273.20 (on an FTE basis)
- Student–teacher ratio: 13.31:1

Other information
- Website: www.tmisd.us

Tuloso-Midway Independent School District is a public school district in Nueces County, Texas (USA). Their mascots are warriors, for the males and Cherokees representing females. The school colors are maroon and gold. Tuloso-Midway is part of the 30-4A district and Wade Miller serves as their athletic director since the summer 2017 semester. TMISD Athletics Tuloso Midway athletics include: Basketball, Baseball, Softball, Soccer, Track and field, Cross Country, Volleyball, Swimming and Diving, Golf, and Special Olympics

The district serves sections of Corpus Christi as well as high school students from the London Independent School District. It also accepts transfer students.

The school system is on a year-around calendar, meaning they have periodic "intersessions" throughout the school year. School Calendar

In 2009, the school district was rated "academically acceptable" by the Texas Education Agency.

== Schools ==
- Tuloso-Midway High School (Grades 9–12)

Head Principal- Ann Bartosh

- Tuloso-Midway Middle School (Grades 6–8)
- Tuloso-Midway Intermediate School (Grades 3–5)
- Tuloso-Midway Primary School (Grades PK-2)
