= London High School (Texas) =

Public school in Texas, United States

Location
- 1306 FM 43; Corpus Christi, Texas 78415; United States; 27.689029°N 97.479769°W

Information
- School type: Public high school
- Established: 2011
- School district: London Independent School District
- Principal: Jennifer Holland
- Teaching staff: 31.70 (on an FTE basis)
- Grades: 9-12
- Enrollment: 541 (2024–2025)
- Student to teacher ratio: 17.07
- Colors: Maroon & White
- Athletics conference: UIL Class AAA
- Mascot: Pirate
- Website: londonisdnet-36-us-central1-01.preview.finalsitecdn.com

London High School is a public high school located in an unincorporated area south of Corpus Christi, Texas, United States and classified as a 4A school by the UIL. It is a part of the London Independent School District located in south central Nueces County. The district added high school grades in 2011 after being a K-8 district for years. In 2015, the school was rated "Met Standard" by the Texas Education Agency.

== Athletics ==
The London Pirates compete in these sports

- Soccer
- Baseball
- Basketball
- Cross Country
- Football
- Golf
- Softball
- Tennis
- Track and Field
- Volleyball

=== State Titles ===
- Baseball
  - 2022(3A), 2025(3A/D1)

==== State Finalists ====
- Baseball
  - 2026(3A/D1)
