= Tuloso-Midway High School =

Public school in Texas, United States

Location
- 2653 McKenzie Road; Corpus Christi, Texas 78460; United States; 27.828739°N 97.576200°W

Information
- School type: Public high school
- School district: Tuloso-Midway Independent School District
- Principal: Gabriel Alvarado
- Staff: 91.99 (FTE)
- Grades: 9–12
- Enrollment: 1,069 (2023–2024)
- Student to teacher ratio: 11.62
- Colors: Maroon and gold
- Athletics conference: UIL Class AAAA
- Mascot: Warriors and Cherokees
- Website: hs.tmisd.us

Tuloso-Midway High School is a public high school in Corpus Christi, Texas and is part of the Tuloso-Midway Independent School District.

== History ==
Tuloso-Midway Independent School District began in 1887 when a schoolhouse was constructed on donated land in the Tuloso area. The school's first teacher was an individual named Murdock who taught nine students for a six-month term. Twenty-seven years later, in 1914, the first Midway school was established in an adjacent community. In 1938, the Tuloso and Midway communities planned the formation of the Tuluso-Midway Independent School District. By 1947, the district had come into being.

Two years later, in 1949, the school district had its first graduating class consisting of five students. Tuluso-Midway Independent School District continued to expand in May 1969, absorbing the Clarkwood Independent School District and the Violet Common School District. The newly formed district briefly adopted the name of The Tuloso-Midway Consolidated Independent School District. A year later the district's name reverted to the original name.

In the late 1960s, it opened a new campus on La Branch Parkway, a large indoor-outdoor complex with architecture featuring a domed auditorium, a crescent-shaped roof on its gymnasium, and a large interior band hall. The campus had a central courtyard and was located adjacent to the West Guth Park. The school was well-suited to its student body with very modern facilities, until population growth in the 1980s forced the district to call for a bond election to upgrade the facilities.

That election gave rise to the new Tuloso-Midway Rand Morgan High School in 1985. Named after the owner of the donated land, Tuloso-Midway High School re-emerged on Haven Drive off McKenzie Road with a large indoor complex built to accommodate over 2000 students, complete with an indoor swimming pool, a new football stadium, baseball field, tennis center, and athletic field house. The school retained the Rand Morgan portion of the name for several years until the period for that stipulation elapsed.

In the 2000s, in an effort to keep the high school at the forefront of facilities in South Texas, two different bond elections were passed which included additional improvements. The first called for a new two-story science wing to be built on the south end of the existing building. The second bond election in 2008 took the improvements a step further and changed the look of the campus completely. The Dr. Sue Nelson Performing Arts Complex was built at the entrance to the school, with the goal of enhancing the school's performing arts program in 2014. The TM theatre department is proud to be home of 2018 5A and 2021 4A UIL One Act Play State Champions. Some of the plays TM Theatre has performed are, "These Shining Lives"," The Caucasian Chalk Circle","Moon Over Buffalo", and "Little Shop of Horrors". Tuloso Midway is also proud to be led by directors, Ms.Wendy Pratt, Mrs. Lynn Esquivel, and Mr. Curtis Ashby. This award winning team has worked together for 10+ years as of 2023. New and state-of-the-art baseball and softball fields were also added to the complex, as was a domed facility for indoor events.

=== 2015 accountability rating ===
Based on the accountability ratings released by the Texas Education Agency in 2015, Tuloso-Midway High's Accountability Rating was "Met Standard" with two Distinction Designations, Top 25 Percent Closing Performance Gaps and Postsecondary Readiness.

== Athletics ==
Boys' teams are referred to as the Warriors and girls' teams are referred to as the Cherokees. The Tuloso-Midway teams compete in the following sports:

- Baseball
- Basketball
- Cross Country
- Football
- Golf
- Powerlifting
- Soccer
- Softball
- Swimming
- Tennis
- Track and Field
- Volleyball

=== State titles ===
- Girls basketball
  - 1970 (3A)
- Boys cross country
  - 2001 (4A)

Boys and Girls State Champions in Swimming and Diving
