= London Independent School District =

School district in Texas, United States

Address
- 1356 FM 43 Corpus Christi, TX, 78415; United States

District information
- Grades: PK–12
- Schools: 4
- NCES District ID: 4827990

Students and staff
- Students: 1,726 (2023–2024)
- Teachers: 98.70 (on an FTE basis)
- Student–teacher ratio: 17.49:1

Other information
- Website: www.londonisd.net

London Independent School District is a public school district located in Nueces County, Texas (USA).

The district, located in Corpus Christi, Texas, has four campuses; London Elementary, which serves students in grades pre-kindergarten through second grade; London Intermediate, which serves students grades third through fifth grade; London Middle, which serves grades sixth through eighth grade, and London High school, which serves ninth through twelfth grade. The district's high school opened in 2011, and is a 3A school as of the 2020-2021 enrollment year, and serves 1,290 students in grades Pre-K through 12th. LISD contains 98 square miles; with the addition of a new Elementary building, and new Gymnasium wing completed in mid 2020. School mascot is a Pirate.

On July 1, 1991, the Santa Cruz Independent School District merged into London ISD.

In 2009, the school district was rated "exemplary" by the Texas Education Agency.

== Governance ==
London Independent School District elects seven Board of Education members on a four year basis. The Board members appoint a superintendent to carry out day-to-day district operations. The current Board of Education members are Russell Manning (President), Scott Frazier (Vice-President), Jessica Gutierrez, Michelle Braselton, Blake Chapman, Cara Fines, Rob Leon. The current superintendent is Dr. Bill Chapman who was appointed in 2024.

== Schools ==
- London High School (9-12)
- London Middle School (6-8)
- London Intermediate School (3-5)
- London Elementary School (Pre-K-2)
