= National Register of Historic Places listings in Live Oak County, Texas =

Location of Live Oak County in Texas

This is a list of the National Register of Historic Places listings in Live Oak County, Texas.

This is intended to be a complete list of properties listed on the National Register of Historic Places in Live Oak County, Texas. There are three properties listed on the National Register in the county. One property is also a Recorded Texas Historic Landmark.

This National Park Service list is complete through NPS recent listings posted March 21, 2025.

== Current listings ==
The publicly disclosed locations of National Register properties may be seen in a mapping service provided.

	Name on the Register	Image	Date listed	Location	City or town	Description
1	Fort Merrill	Fort Merrill	November 22, 1991 (#91001686)	Address restricted	Dinero	
2	Live Oak County Jail	Live Oak County Jail	February 25, 2004 (#04000098)	Public square in Oakville; 28°26′56″N 98°06′05″W	Oakville	Recorded Texas Historic Landmark
3	Pagan Site, 41 LK 58	Pagan Site, 41 LK 58	August 10, 1978 (#78002972)	Address restricted	Calliham	

== See also ==
- National Register of Historic Places listings in Texas
- Recorded Texas Historic Landmarks in Live Oak County
