= Choke Canyon Reservoir =

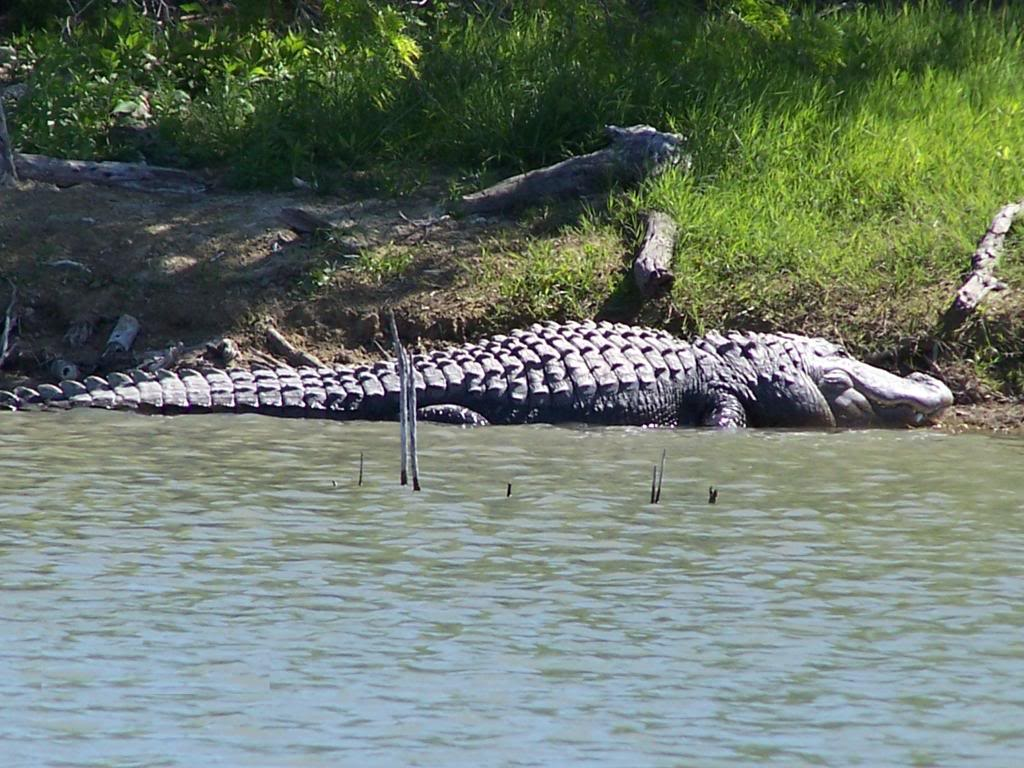
- Alligator at Choke Canyon

- Location within Texas Location within the United States

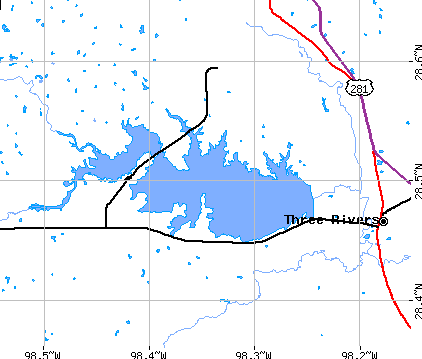
- area map
- Location: Live Oak / McMullen counties, Texas, United States
- Coordinates: 28°30.00′N 98°21.00′W
- Type: Water supply reservoir
- Primary inflows: Frio River
- Primary outflows: Frio River
- Basin countries: United States
- Surface area: 25,670 acres (10,390 ha)
- Max. depth: 95.5 ft (29.1 m)
- Water volume: 695,000 acre⋅ft (857,000,000 m^{3})
- Surface elevation: 220.5 ft (67.2 m)

Choke Canyon Reservoir is a reservoir in South Texas, United States. The lake and the dam that creates it are owned by the United States Bureau of Reclamation and managed by the City of Corpus Christi.

== Geography ==
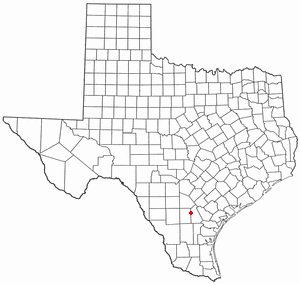
Location in Texas

Choke Canyon Reservoir is 4 miles (6 km) west of the town of Three Rivers and about 65 miles (105 km) south of the city of San Antonio. It impounds water from the Frio River shortly before the river's confluence with the Nueces River. The reservoir covers 25,670 acres (103.9 km^{2}) in Live Oak and McMullen counties, and has a capacity of more than 695,000 acre-feet (857,000,000 m^{3}) of water.

== Uses ==
Choke Canyon Reservoir provides drinking water for the city of Corpus Christi. The reservoir also provides good fishing opportunities, especially for largemouth bass and catfish. Choke Canyon State Park, located in two units on the south shore of the lake, provides access to the lake and a number of other recreational activities.

== Fish and plant life ==
Choke Canyon Reservoir has been stocked with species of fish intended to improve the utility of the reservoir for recreational fishing. Fish present in Choke Canyon Reservoir include alligator gar, white bass, white crappie, catfish, and largemouth bass, sunfish, and bluegill. Plant life in the lake includes American pondweed, coontail, water stargrass, rushes, cattail, and hydrilla.

It is also the westernmost range of the American Alligator.

The site hosted a rare bird, a Spotted Rail, in December 2020, attracting hundreds of birdwatchers. The record represents the 3rd record of the species for Texas, and the 4th for the United States.
