= Anna Rose, Texas =

Ghost town in Texas, US

- Ghost town
- Location in Texas
- Coordinates: 28.08584520°N 98.17083900°W
- Country: United States
- State: Texas
- County: Live Oak

Anna Rosa is a ghost town in Live Oak County, Texas, United States. Situated on Farm to Market Road 624, a post office operated from 1915 to c. 1930. A farming community, its schools desegregated in 1944—ten years before Brown v. Board of Education—and were consolidated by George West Independent School District in 1948. The community declined following World War II, and was abandoned by the end of the 20th century.
