= Lake Corpus Christi =

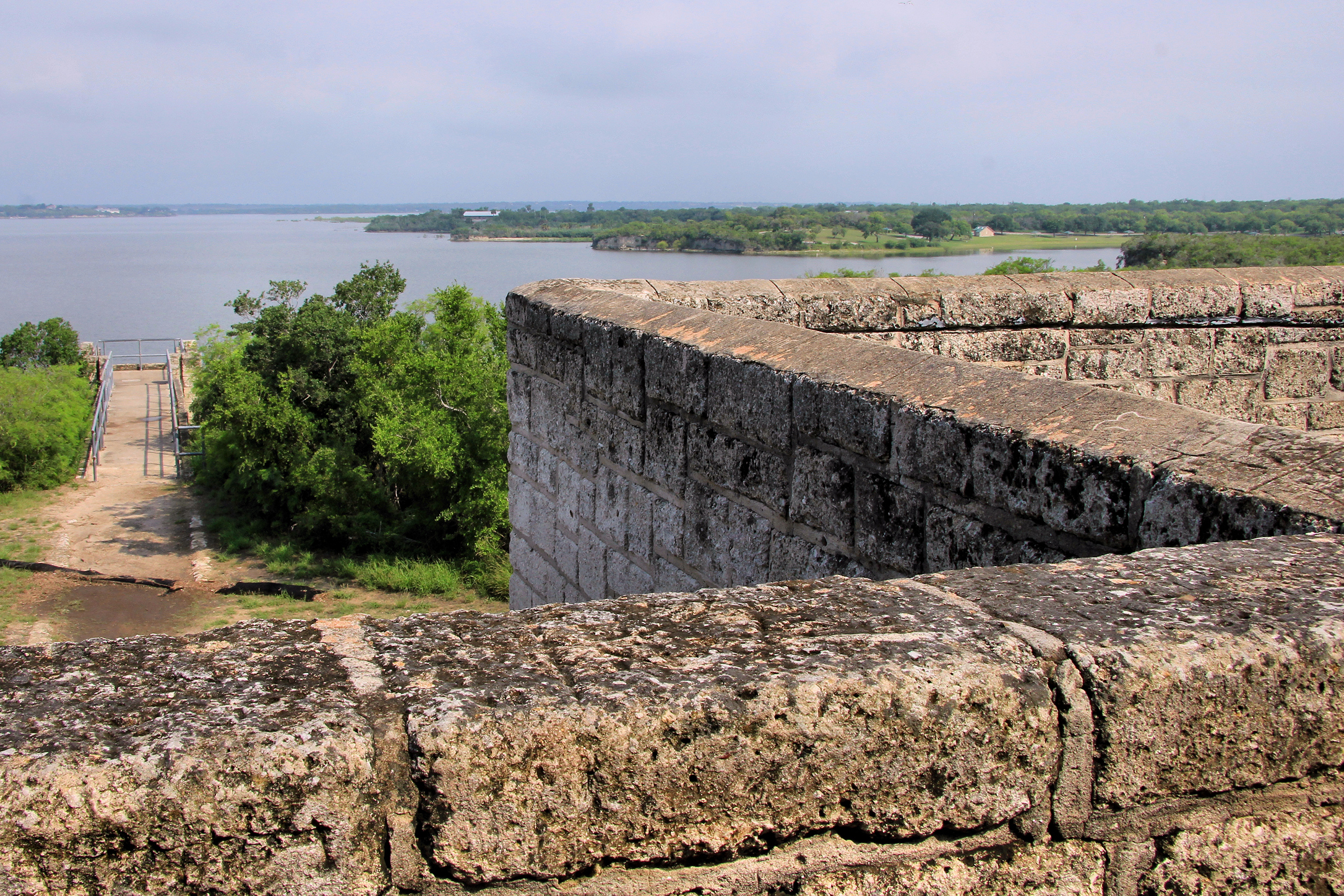

- Location within Texas Location within the United States
- Location: Live Oak / San Patricio / Jim Wells counties, Texas, US
- Coordinates: 28°5.94′N 97°53.35′W
- Type: Water supply reservoir
- Primary inflows: Nueces River
- Primary outflows: Nueces River
- Basin countries: United States
- Surface area: 18,256 acres (7,388 ha)
- Max. depth: 60 ft (18 m)
- Water volume: 269,900 acre⋅ft (0.3329 km^{3})
- Surface elevation: 94 ft (29 m)

Lake Corpus Christi is an artificial reservoir in coastal southern Texas, situated on the Nueces River at the intersection of Live Oak, San Patricio, and Jim Wells counties. Managed by the City of Corpus Christi, the current lake was created by the impoundment of the river following the completion of the Wesley E. Seale Dam in 1958. The lake spans a surface area of over 19,000 acres. The reservoir's primary purpose is to provide the municipal drinking water supply for the city of Corpus Christi. The lake also hosts Lake Corpus Christi State Park, several youth Scouting camps, and extensive facilities for fishing, and it is a habitat for over 200 documented species of birds.

== History ==
Before the lake was ever created, the land surrounding the Nueces River was populated by multiple Karankawa and Lipan Apache tribes. The land continued to be a heavily contested boundary throughout history; following multiple colonization attempts and the Texas Revolution. In 1929, the La Fruta Dam was constructed in an attempt to dam the Nueces River. This created a reservoir named Lake Lovenskiold, after the city's mayor. However, the dam quickly failed and breached in November 1929, ten months after construction finished. In 1935 the Mathis Dam was constructed. Funded by President Franklin D. Roosevelt, the reservoir was officially renamed to Lake Corpus Christi. By the 1940s, heavy silt began to accumulate along the dam which decreased the lake's water capacity. Shortly after, the city planned to expand the dam to accommodate a larger water supply. The new dam would raise the water level by 20 feet, which led to years of legal battles with local landowners. The current Wesley E. Seale Dam was completed in April 1959. This 75-foot high structure submerged the previous dam and expanded the reservoir to over 21,000 acres.

Between 1934 and 1936, the Civilian Conservation Corps (CCC) company 886 moved in to build infrastructure around the lake and Lake Corpus Christi State Park. The workers constructed several bridges, roads, and a Mediterranean-style refectory, known as "The castle". The castle currently functions as the park headquarters.

In early 2026, prolonged drought conditions across South Texas caused Lake Corpus Christi's water level to fall to historically low levels. In April, the reservoir held just over 9% of its capacity, according to The Texas Observer.. Additionally, forgotten pieces of history have reemerged from the lake bed, including old 1930s automobile bridges, early CCC boathouse foundations, and roads. The drought also affected Choke Canyon Reservoir, another major source of water for Corpus Christi, raising concerns about the region's water supply.

== Geography ==
It is an artificial lake owned by the city of Corpus Christi, four miles southwest of Mathis on the Nueces River at the intersection of the Live Oak, San Patricio, and Jim Wells county lines (at 28°03' N, 97°52' W). The lake has a conservation surface area of 19,336 acres, a drainage area of 16,656 square miles, and a conservation storage capacity of 269,900 acre-feet. It serves as a source of municipal water supply. Wesley E. Seale Dam, a seventy-five-foot-high earthen dam, was engineered by Ambursen Engineering and constructed by Henry B. Zachry. In 1934 the state leased 288 acres surrounding the lake from the city of Corpus Christi for a park. Around the lake, flat to rolling terrain is surfaced by deep, fine sandy loam that supports hardwood forest, brush, and grasses.

== Uses ==
Lake Corpus Christi provides drinking water for the city of Corpus Christi. Along with Choke Canyon Reservoir, it forms part of the regional water supply system serving Corpus Christi and surrounding communities. In a May 2026 article, water resources researcher Michelle Hummel explained that the city's water system serves more than 500,000 people and large industrial customers.Droughts and industrial demand have raised concern about the reliability of the reliability of the regions water supply

The reservoir also provides good fishing opportunities, especially for largemouth bass and catfish. Lake Corpus Christi State Park provides camping and picnicking areas and two fishing piers.. Camp Karankawa is a Scouting America camp operated by the South Texas Council, opened in 1944. Its 130 acres on the shore of Lake Corpus Christi is leased from Lake Corpus Christi State Park on a 99-year lease. Camp Green Hill is a Girl Scout camp located on 50 acres on the lake operated by the Girl Scouts of Greater South Texas.

== Wildlife and flora ==
Lake Corpus Christi has been stocked with species of fish intended to improve the utility of the reservoir for recreational fishing. Fish present in Lake Corpus Christi include crappie, white bass, catfish, largemouth bass, sunfish, bluegill and alligator gar.

Plant life in the lake includes water stargrass, water lettuce, water hyacinth, American pondweed, coontail, rushes, and cattail. The American alligator (Alligator mississippiensis) also inhabits the lake.

The lake and surrounding state park are situated along a major migration flyway, making it a prominent destination for birdwatching. Over 200 species of birds have been documented in the area. Notable resident and migratory species include:

- Waterfowl: Black-bellied whistling-duck, wood duck, blue-winged teal, mottled duck, canvasback, and redhead.
- Grebes: Least grebe, pied-billed grebe, and eared grebe.
- Pelicans and Cormorants: American white pelican, brown pelican, neotropic cormorant, and anhinga.
- Wading Birds: Great blue heron, great egret, snowy egret, tricolored heron, black-crowned night-heron, and roseate spoonbill.

== Gallery ==
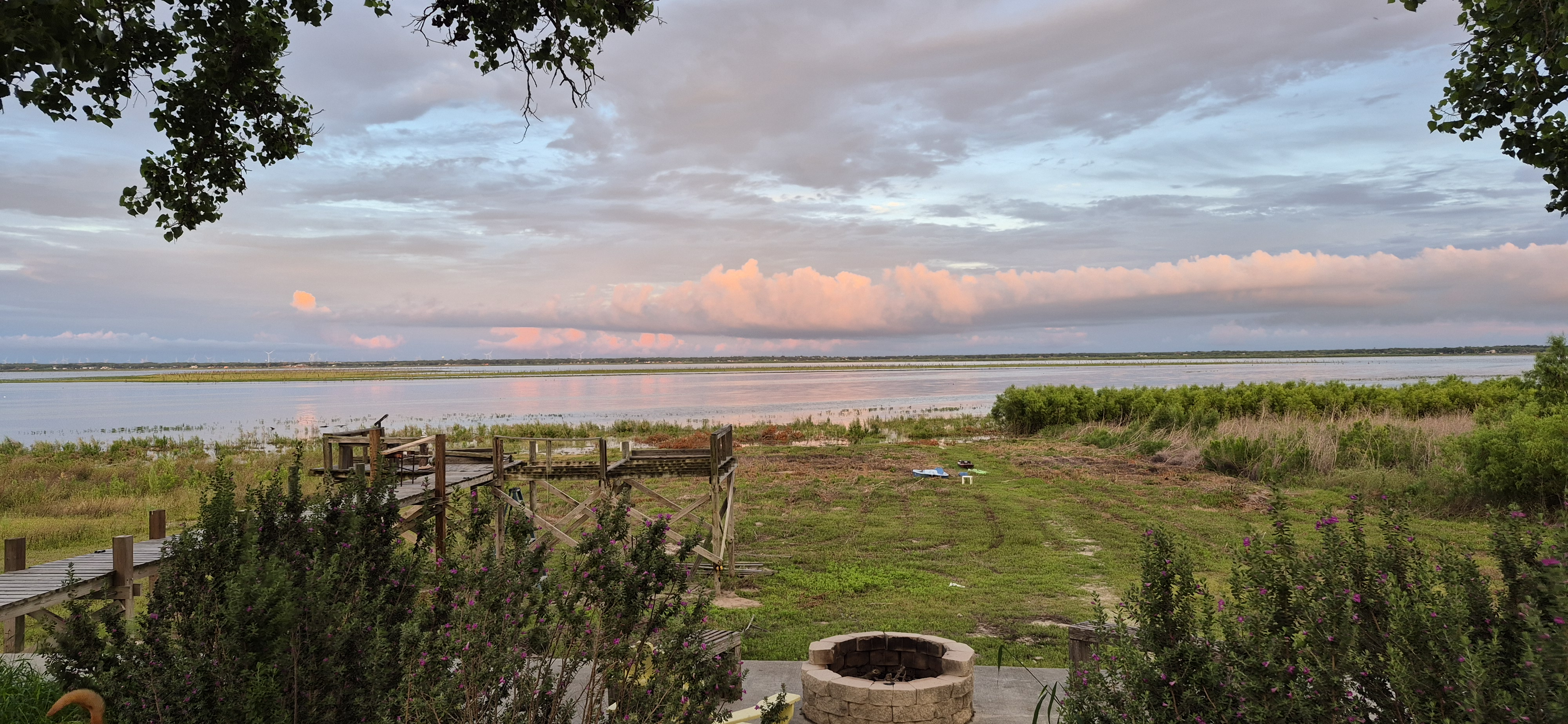
6/5/2026. Lake Corpus Christi is reaching record lows, with the reservoir capacity only being 26%. Multiple islands can be seen in the middle of the lake.

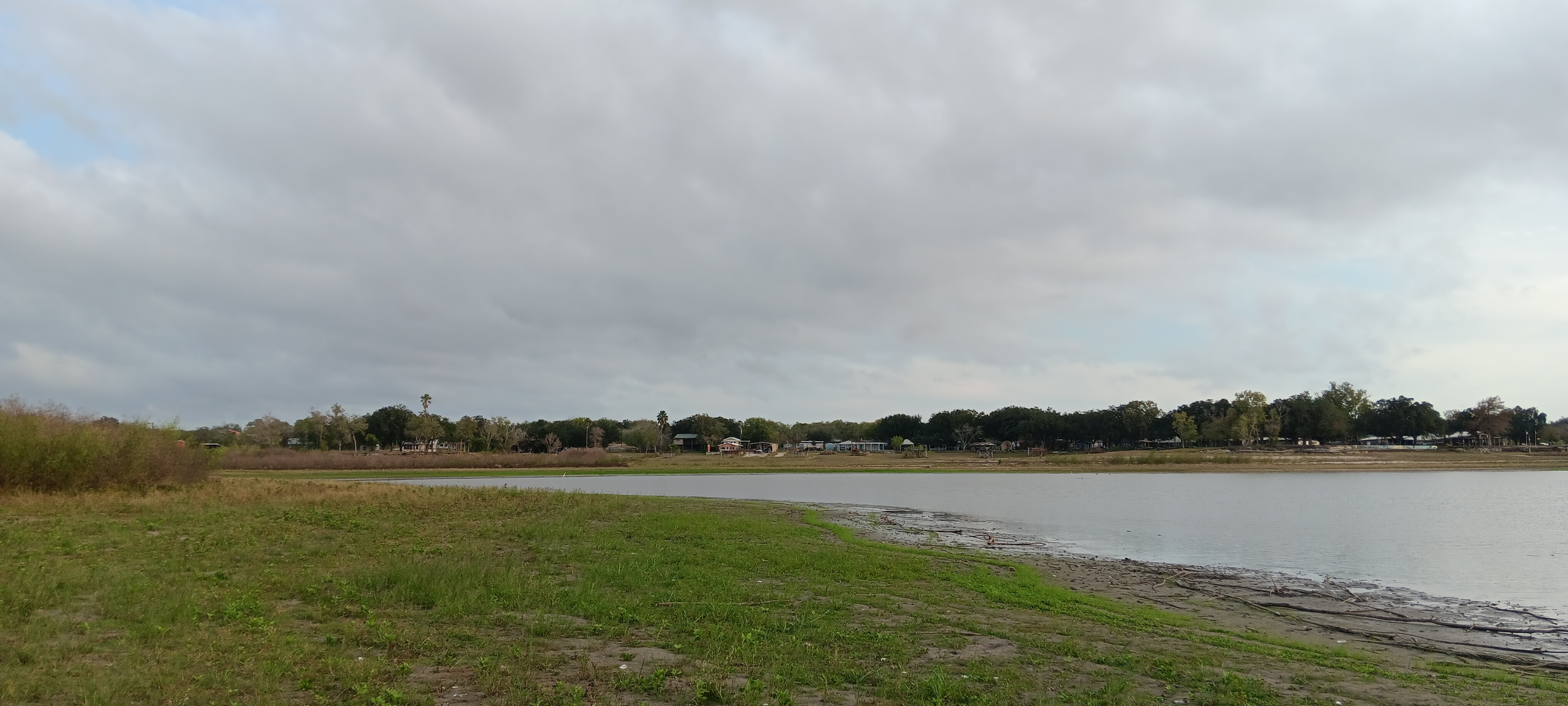

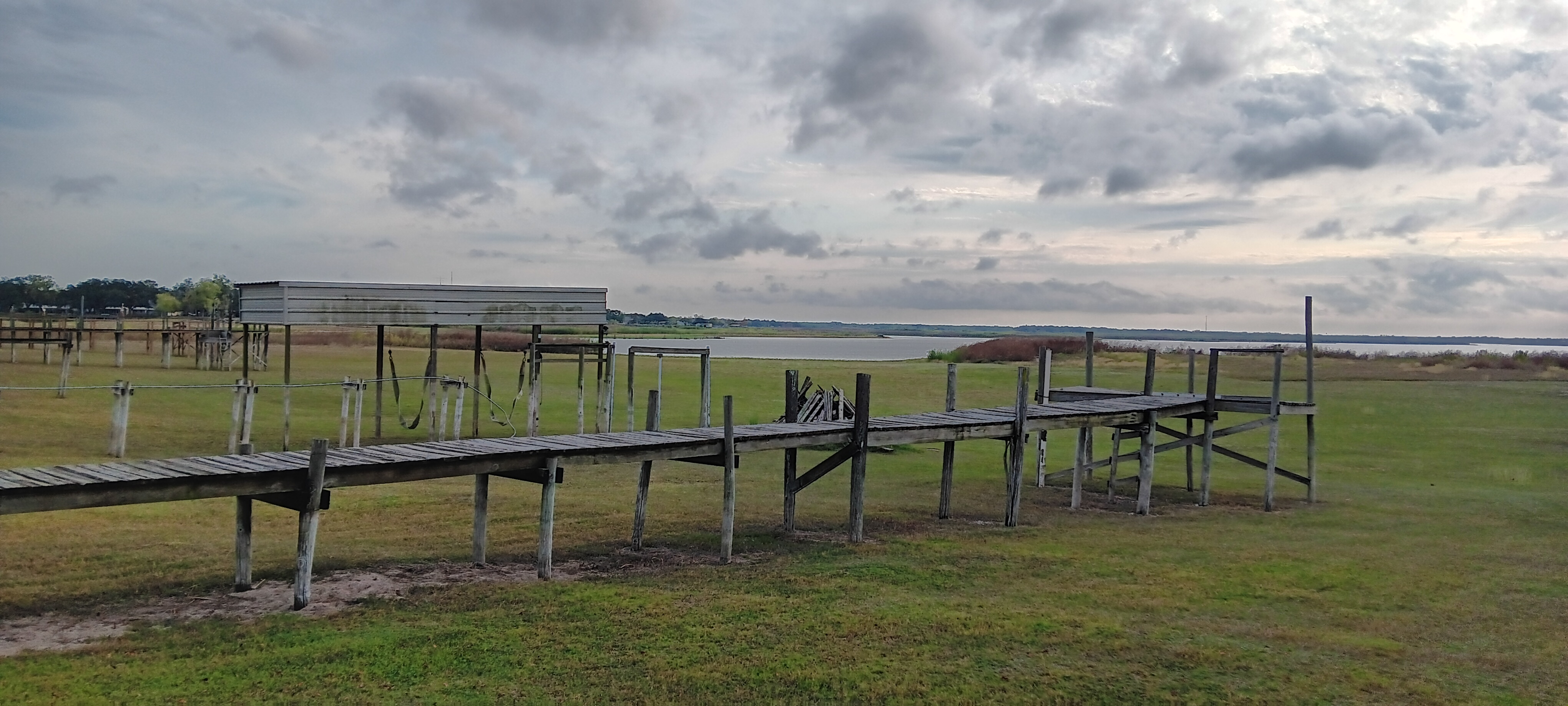

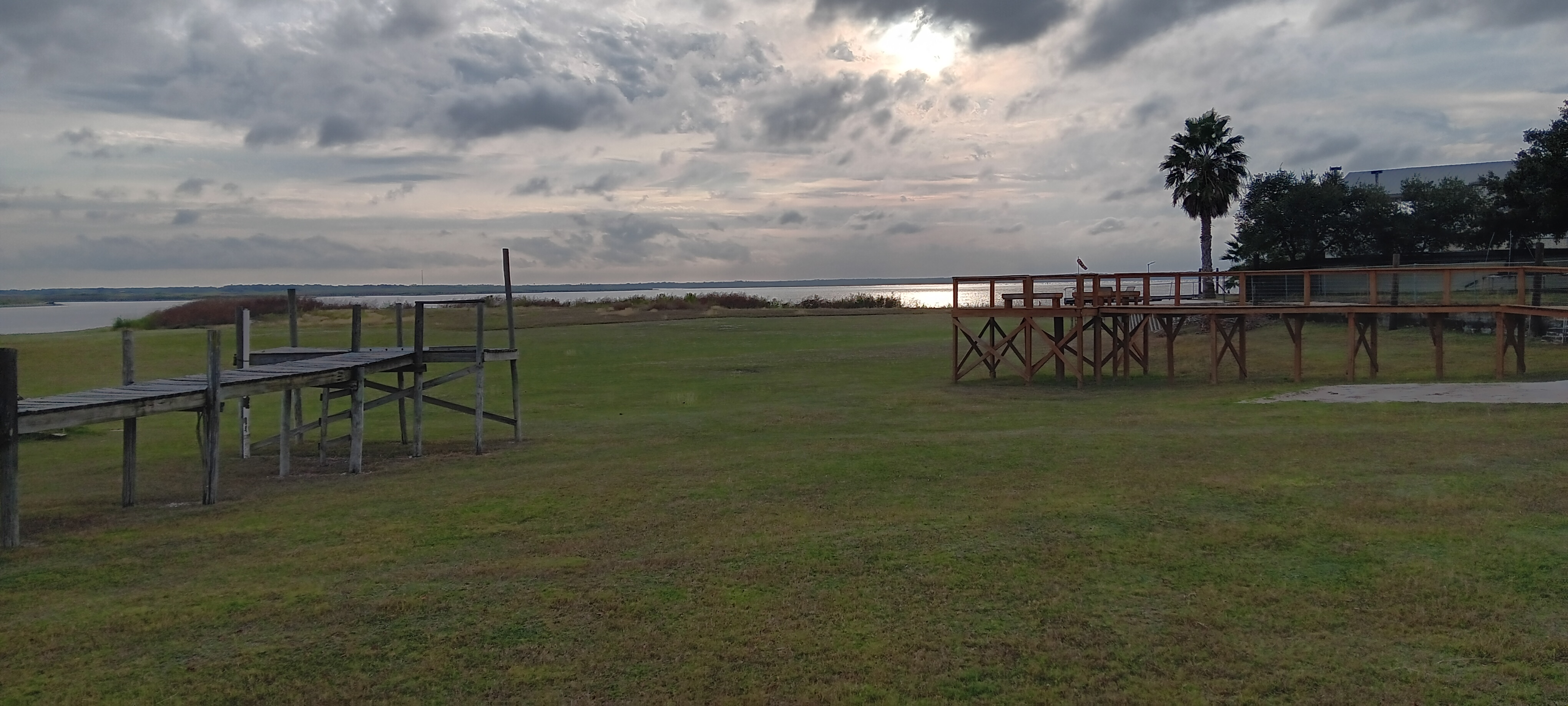

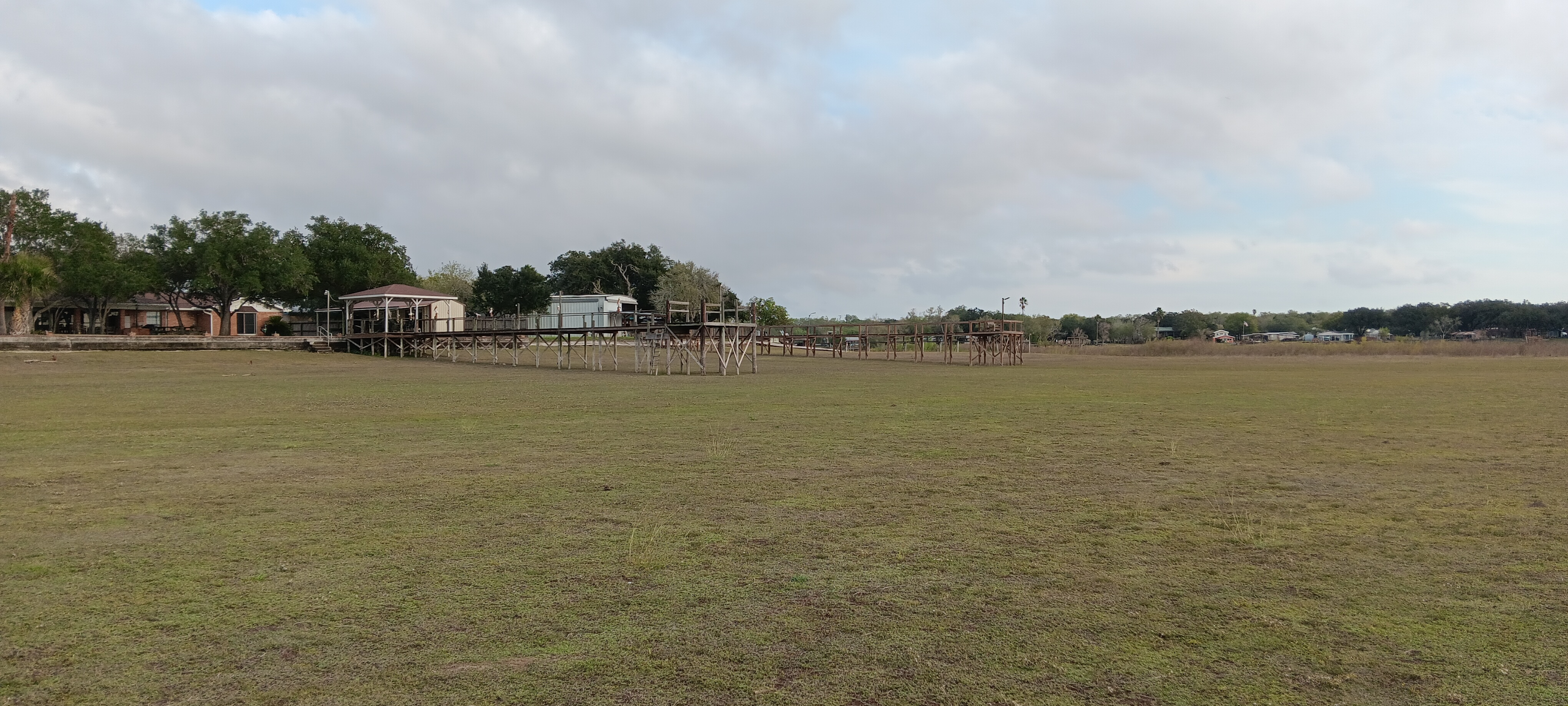

== See also ==
- Corpus Christi, Texas
- Nueces River
