= Swinney Switch, Texas =

- Unincorporated community
- Location in Texas Location in the United States
- Coordinates: 28°14′41″N 97°55′13″W
- Country: United States
- State: Texas
- County: Live Oak
- Elevation: 210 ft (64 m)
- Time zone: UTC-6 (Central (CST))
  - Summer (DST): UTC-5 (CDT)
- ZIP codes: 78368
- GNIS feature ID: 1348156

Swinney Switch, also known as Swinney, is an unincorporated community in southeastern Live Oak County, Texas, United States. It lies approximately 12 miles (19 km) southeast of the city of George West, the county seat of Live Oak County, at the intersection of FM 534 and FM 3024 near Interstate 37. Its elevation is 210 feet (64 m).

The community is named for Sidney J. Swinney, who moved to Live Oak County from Gonzales and opened a store and gas station in the area in 1917. Swinney added the word "Switch" to the name of his settlement in the hopes that a railroad would build through it.
