= Three Rivers, Texas =

- City
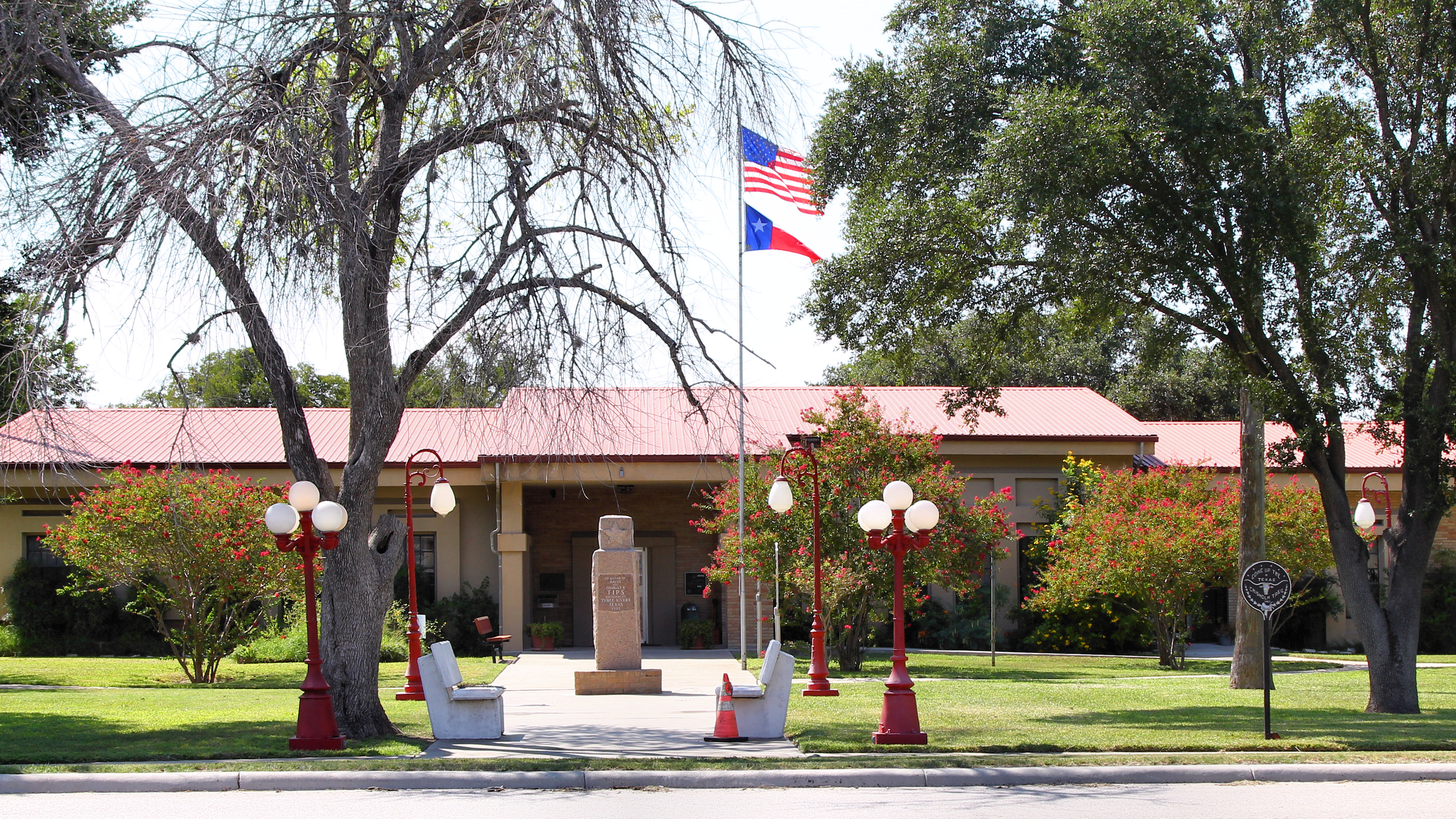
- City Hall

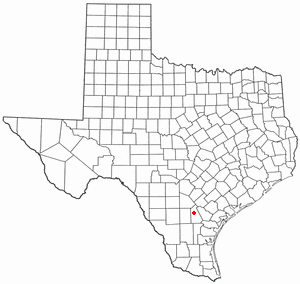
- Location of Three Rivers, Texas

- Coordinates: 28°28′2″N 98°10′46″W
- Country: United States
- State: Texas
- County: Live Oak

Area
  - Total: 1.47 sq mi (3.80 km^{2})
  - Land: 1.46 sq mi (3.79 km^{2})
  - Water: 0.0039 sq mi (0.01 km^{2})
- Elevation: 144 ft (44 m)

Population (2020)
  - Total: 1,474
  - Density: 1,010/sq mi (389/km^{2})
- Time zone: UTC-6 (Central (CST))
  - Summer (DST): UTC-5 (CDT)
- ZIP codes: 78060, 78071
- Area code: 361
- FIPS code: 48-72872
- GNIS feature ID: 1348525
- Website: www.gothreerivers.com

Three Rivers is a city in Live Oak County, Texas, United States. Its population was 1,474 at the 2020 census.

== History ==
Mrs. Annie T. Hamilton of Cuero owned a tract of land in the Brush Country where Three Rivers now sits. At the urging of Mrs. Hamilton, Charles R. Tips came to the Brush Country. In 1913, Mrs. Hamilton paid the San Antonio, Uvalde and Gulf Railroad to build a depot on her land. Tips organized a townsite company and sold land for the township. On July 4, 1913, the town began with a grand opening and first sale of land. From its formation, it was designed as a segregated township, with the "Mexican" section located between the river and the railroad tracks, west of the business section. This can still be seen today in the differences of street names, though forced segregation ended many decades past.

The city is named for its proximity to three rivers, the Atascosa, the Frio, and Nueces (the Atascosa joins the Frio north of the city, while the Frio joins the Nueces south of the city). Originally named Hamiltonburg, the city name was changed when mail meant for the city was accidentally delivered to Hamilton, Texas, instead. Tips suggested the town be named for its location near the rivers, and Three Rivers was approved as the new name by the post office department on May 1, 1914. Three Rivers was incorporated in 1926 and operates under the general-law aldermanic form of government. In 1925, its population was estimated at 1,000; in 1931, it was 1,275; and in 1965, it was 1,932, with 70 businesses.

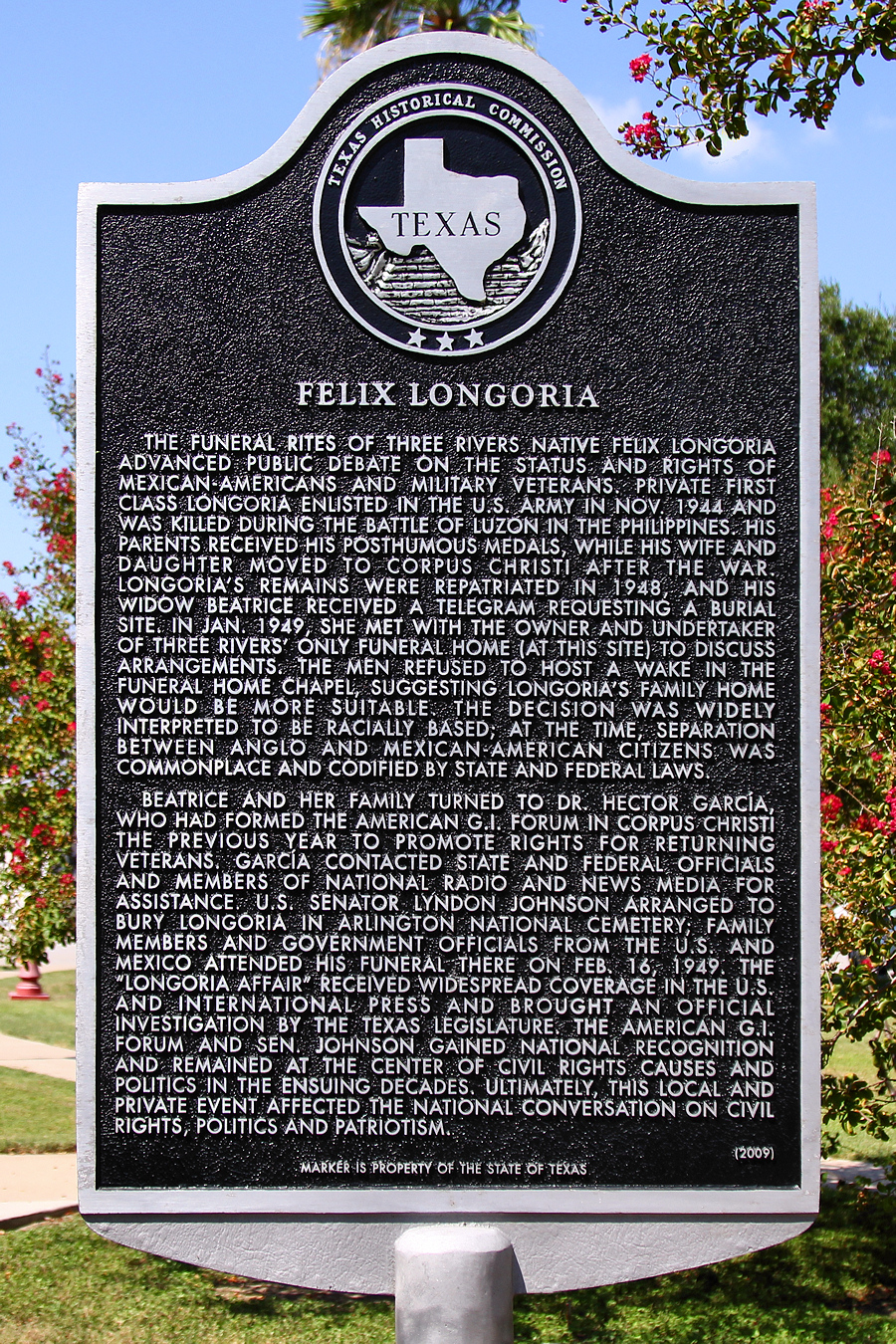
The Felix Longoria Texas Historical Marker

In 1920, natural gas was discovered near Three Rivers and was piped into town and a small refinery was built. The first glass factory in Texas was built at Three Rivers in 1922 as the gas for fuel and local sand were plentiful. The onset of the Great Depression forced the sale of the factory to the Ball Glass Company in 1937, and the factory was permanently closed in 1938. The small refinery, however, expanded over time to become a major Diamond Shamrock refinery by 1990 and still is a major employer in the town.

In 1948–1949, the city of Three Rivers gained notoriety as the location of what has become known as the "Longoria Affair" when the director of the only funeral home in town refused to allow chapel services in 1948 for the body of a "Mexican-American" soldier killed during World War II in 1945. The installation of a Texas Historical Marker at the site of the funeral home came with controversy. The new owners of the property asked that the marker not be returned after it was repaired, so it was rededicated and installed in the town square at the entrance to city hall.

== Geography ==
Three Rivers is located at 28°28′02″N 98°10′46″W (28.467155, –98.179451).

According to the United States Census Bureau, the city has a total area of 1.5 square miles (3.9 km^{2}), all land.

=== Climate ===
The climate in this area is characterized by hot, humid summers and generally mild to cool winters. According to the Köppen climate classification, Three Rivers has a humid subtropical climate, Cfa on climate maps.

Climate data for Three Rivers, Texas (Choke Canyon Dam) (1991–2020 normals, extremes 1983–present)
Month	Jan	Feb	Mar	Apr	May	Jun	Jul	Aug	Sep	Oct	Nov	Dec	Year
Record high °F (°C)	90 (32)	99 (37)	100 (38)	105 (41)	106 (41)	111 (44)	109 (43)	107 (42)	112 (44)	101 (38)	95 (35)	89 (32)	112 (44)
Mean maximum °F (°C)	82.2 (27.9)	87.0 (30.6)	90.2 (32.3)	94.8 (34.9)	98.0 (36.7)	100.9 (38.3)	102.0 (38.9)	103.0 (39.4)	100.1 (37.8)	94.7 (34.8)	88.4 (31.3)	83.4 (28.6)	104.7 (40.4)
Mean daily maximum °F (°C)	64.1 (17.8)	68.4 (20.2)	74.9 (23.8)	81.4 (27.4)	87.7 (30.9)	93.1 (33.9)	95.2 (35.1)	96.6 (35.9)	90.7 (32.6)	83.7 (28.7)	73.3 (22.9)	65.3 (18.5)	81.2 (27.3)
Daily mean °F (°C)	53.4 (11.9)	57.6 (14.2)	64.2 (17.9)	70.3 (21.3)	77.6 (25.3)	82.9 (28.3)	84.5 (29.2)	85.3 (29.6)	80.3 (26.8)	72.6 (22.6)	62.6 (17.0)	54.9 (12.7)	70.5 (21.4)
Mean daily minimum °F (°C)	42.8 (6.0)	46.8 (8.2)	53.4 (11.9)	59.2 (15.1)	67.4 (19.7)	72.7 (22.6)	73.9 (23.3)	74.1 (23.4)	70.0 (21.1)	61.5 (16.4)	51.9 (11.1)	44.5 (6.9)	59.9 (15.5)
Mean minimum °F (°C)	29.3 (−1.5)	32.2 (0.1)	37.3 (2.9)	44.5 (6.9)	54.9 (12.7)	67.1 (19.5)	69.6 (20.9)	70.0 (21.1)	60.1 (15.6)	44.9 (7.2)	35.3 (1.8)	30.1 (−1.1)	26.5 (−3.1)
Record low °F (°C)	18 (−8)	14 (−10)	24 (−4)	36 (2)	43 (6)	58 (14)	62 (17)	63 (17)	50 (10)	29 (−2)	26 (−3)	11 (−12)	11 (−12)
Average precipitation inches (mm)	1.51 (38)	1.41 (36)	2.38 (60)	2.01 (51)	2.98 (76)	2.68 (68)	2.76 (70)	1.69 (43)	3.62 (92)	2.33 (59)	1.49 (38)	1.65 (42)	26.51 (673)
Average snowfall inches (cm)	0.0 (0.0)	0.0 (0.0)	0.0 (0.0)	0.0 (0.0)	0.0 (0.0)	0.0 (0.0)	0.0 (0.0)	0.0 (0.0)	0.0 (0.0)	0.0 (0.0)	0.0 (0.0)	0.3 (0.76)	0.3 (0.76)
Average precipitation days (≥ 0.01 in)	7.3	7.0	6.6	5.6	6.1	6.0	5.3	4.2	7.4	5.4	5.7	7.4	74.0
Average snowy days (≥ 0.1 in)	0.0	0.0	0.0	0.0	0.0	0.0	0.0	0.0	0.0	0.0	0.0	0.1	0.1
Source: NOAA

== Demographics ==
Historical population
Census	Pop.	Note	%±
1930	1,275		—
1940	1,337		4.9%
1950	2,026		51.5%
1960	1,932		−4.6%
1970	1,761		−8.9%
1980	2,133		21.1%
1990	1,889		−11.4%
2000	1,878		−0.6%
2010	1,848		−1.6%
2020	1,474		−20.2%
U.S. Decennial Census

=== 2020 census ===
As of the 2020 census, 1,474 people, 587 households, and 506 families were residing in the city.

The median age was 40.7 years; 23.7% of the residents were under 18 and 18.8% were 65 years of age or older. For every 100 females, there were 107.0 males, and for every 100 females 18 and over, there were 100.5 males age 18 and over.

None of the residents lived in urban areas, while 100.0% lived in rural areas.

Of those households, 29.8% had children under 18 living in them, 43.3% were married-couple households, 24.9% were households with a male householder and no spouse or partner present, and 27.3% were households with a female householder and no spouse or partner present. About 34.1% of all households were made up of individuals, and 13.3% had someone living alone who was 65 or older.

The city had 855 housing units, of which 31.3% were vacant. The homeowner vacancy rate was 4.8% and the rental vacancy rate was 31.1%.

Racial composition as of the 2020 census
Race	Number	Percentage
White	862	58.5%
Black or African American	8	0.5%
American Indian and Alaska Native	10	0.7%
Asian	2	0.1%
Native Hawaiian and other Pacific Islander	0	0.0%
Some other race	117	7.9%
Two or more races	475	32.2%
Hispanic or Latino (of any race)	850	57.7%

=== 2000 census ===
As of the census of 2000, 1,878 people, 704 households, and 492 families lived in the city. The population density was 1,299.7 inhabitants per square mile (501.8/km^{2}). The 876 housing units had an average density of 606.2 per square mile (234.1/km^{2}). The racial makeup of the city was 82.22% White, 0.53% African American, 0.32% Native American, 0.48% Asian 14.00% from other races, and 2.45% from two or more races. Hispanics or Latinos of any race were 50.37% of the population.

Of the 704 households, 36.9% had children under 18 living with them, 53.1% were married couples living together, 12.5% had a female householder with no husband present, and 30.0% were not families; 26.4% of all households were made up of individuals, and 13.4% had someone living alone who was 65 or older. The average household size was 2.61, and the average family size was 3.18.

In the city, the age distribution was 28.1% under 18, 9.0% from 18 to 24, 27.3% from 25 to 44, 21.1% from 45 to 64, and 14.6% who were 65 or older. The median age was 36 years. For every 100 females, there were 90.3 males. For every 100 females 18 and over, there were 88.4 males.

The median income in the city for a household was $27,188 and for a family was $34,188. Males had a median income of $30,337 versus $16,607 for females. The per capita income for the city was $12,814. About 21.6% of families and 23.3% of the population were below the poverty line, including 28.0% of those under 18 and 24.8% of those 65 or over.

== Economic base ==
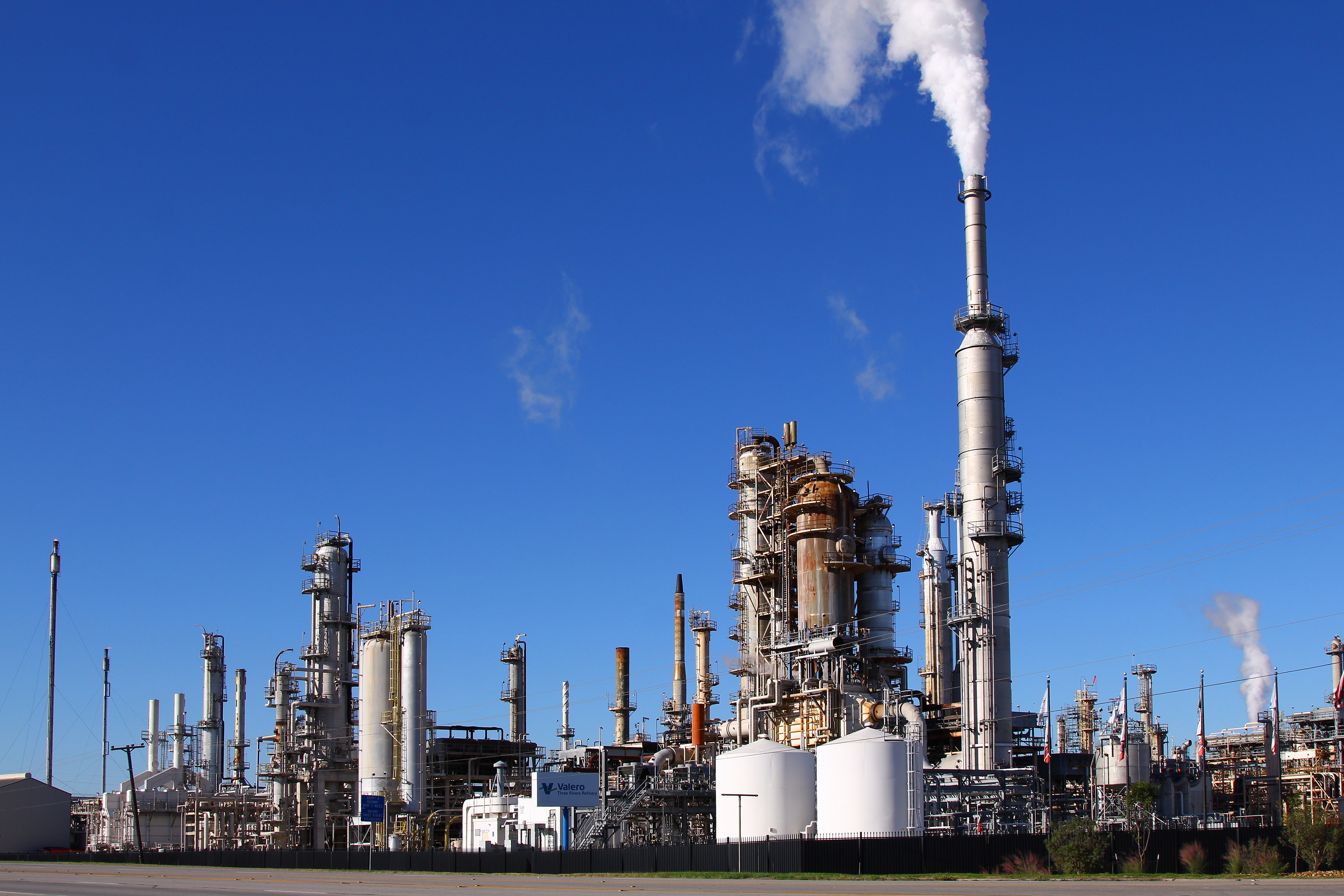
The Valero Three Rivers Refinery

The predominant economic drivers for Three Rivers are oil and gas exploration, refining, ranching, and hunting. Tourism is on the rise due to the gateway to the Choke Canyon Reservoir through Three Rivers. Choke Canyon State Park offers boating, fishing, camping, educational services, and wildlife viewing. The bird migratory routes bring over 200 different species to the Three Rivers area, making it a national destination for bird watching. Accommodations for visitors are plentiful. with hotels and many recreational vehicle parks. Many of these were built to accommodate workers during the recent Eagle Ford oil boom.

Three Rivers is also the site of the historic first glass factory in Texas. Although it is no longer in production and the building has been demolished, a state historical marker stands at its site. Some of the antique shops in town and in the neighboring county seat of George West may sometimes carry a few pieces the factory produced.

Many Three Rivers residents live in or near Three Rivers because of the large number of jobs needed in the nearby Federal Bureau of Prisons located roughly 10 miles west of town, on Hwy 72. The Valero Three Rivers Refinery, located inside the city limits, is another major employer. With the recent fracking surge in the area, Three Rivers is centrally located in the middle of a large field that extends over a three-county area.

== Government and infrastructure ==
The United States Postal Service operates the Three Rivers Post Office.

The Federal Bureau of Prisons Federal Correctional Institution, Three Rivers is located in unincorporated Live Oak County, near Three Rivers.

== Schools ==
A single school district emcompasses the entire city, Three Rivers Independent School District, with Three Rivers Elementary School, Three Rivers Junior High School, and Three Rivers High School.

== Notable people ==
- James Crumley, novelist
- Roy Head, musician
