= Choke Canyon State Park =

State park in Texas, United States

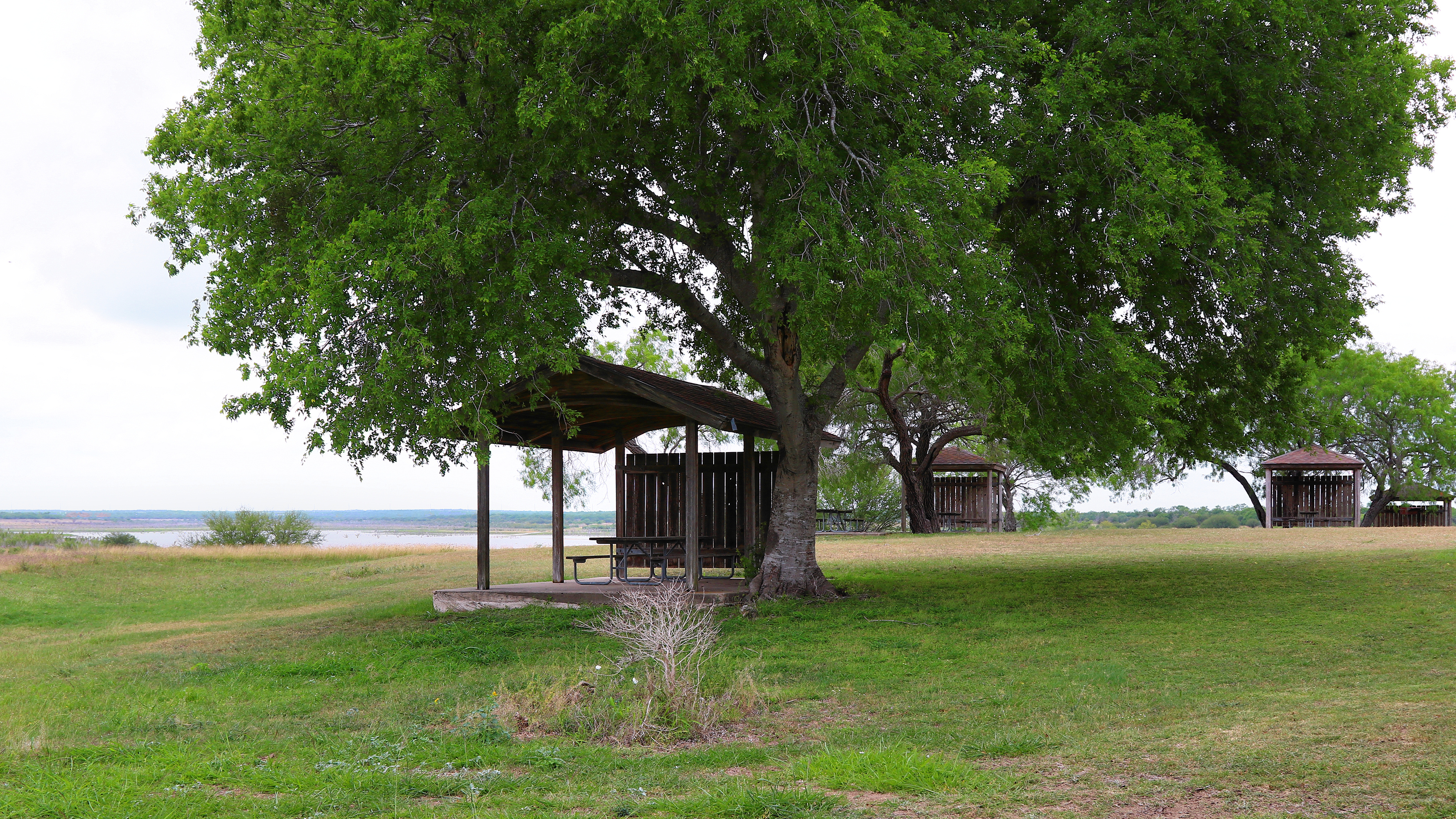
- Picnic sites in Choke Canyon State Park

- Location within Texas Location within the United States
- Location: McMullen and Live Oak County, Texas
- Nearest city: Three Rivers, Texas
- Coordinates: 28°27′57″N 98°21′15″W
- Area: 1,485 acres (6.01 km^{2})
- Established: 1981
- Visitors: 52,434 (in 2025)
- Governing body: Texas Parks and Wildlife Department
- Website: Official site

Choke Canyon State Park is a state park near Three Rivers, Texas, United States. The park is composed of two units: the 1,100-acre (450 ha) Calliham Unit in McMullen County and the 385-acre (156 ha) South Shore Unit in Live Oak County. The Calliham Unit opened on August 21, 1987, and the South Shore Unit opened on March 5, 1986. Both units are located on Choke Canyon Reservoir and managed by the Texas Parks and Wildlife Department (TPWD).

== History ==
Archeological findings indicate Paleo-Indians were in the area more than 10,000 years ago. Nomadic hunters and gatherers came in about 8,000 years ago during the Archaic period in North America. Spanish exploration of Texas began in the 1500s with settlement beginning in the park area in the 1600s.

The state acquired the park in 1981 in a 50-year agreement between the United States Bureau of Reclamation, the city of Corpus Christi and the Nueces River Authority.

== Nature ==
=== Animals ===
Choke Canyon State Park has an array of wildlife, with a significant population of American alligator, white-tailed deer, and collared peccary. Other common animals include Rio Grande wild turkey, coyote, Virginia opossum, eastern fox squirrel, common raccoon, striped skunk and Western diamondback rattlesnake. A significant population of invasive feral pigs roam the area and TPWD conducts public hunts with no bag limit to reduce the numbers.

The park is a premier birding destination, often visited for sightings of crested caracara, bald eagle, and various bird species.

Many types of fish are in Choke Canyon Reservoir. Species include largemouth bass, white bass, striped bass, bluegill, longear sunfish, green sunfish, flathead catfish, channel catfish, blue catfish, white crappie, freshwater drum, European carp and alligator gar.

=== Plants ===
Honey mesquite and prickly pear cactus are predominant plants in the park. Other plants include agarita, Texas persimmon, Texas ebony, retama, tasajillo, Spanish dagger, Buckley's yucca and bald eagle.

== Activities ==
The park has extensive activities available mostly in the Calliham Unit. These include camping, hiking, fishing, boating, swimming, picnicking, birdwatching, tennis, basketball and baseball.

== See also ==
- List of Texas state parks
