= Ray Point, Texas =

- Unincorporated community
- Location in Texas Location in the United States
- Coordinates: 28°30′50″N 98°5′17″W
- Country: United States
- State: Texas
- County: Live Oak

Population (1990)
  - Total: 75
- Time zone: UTC-6 (Central (CST))
  - Summer (DST): UTC-5 (CDT)
- GNIS feature ID: 1380416

Ray Point is a small rural unincorporated community in Live Oak County, Texas, United States. It is a German farming community typical for much of Texas. The most prominent remaining structures are the Ray Point community center and the Ray Point Mercantile (closed). Nearby is the Ray Point cemetery. The nearest city is Three Rivers.

== Demographics ==
In 1990, there were 75 people living in the community, according to the Handbook of Texas Online.
