= Lake Corpus Christi State Park =

State park in Texas, United States

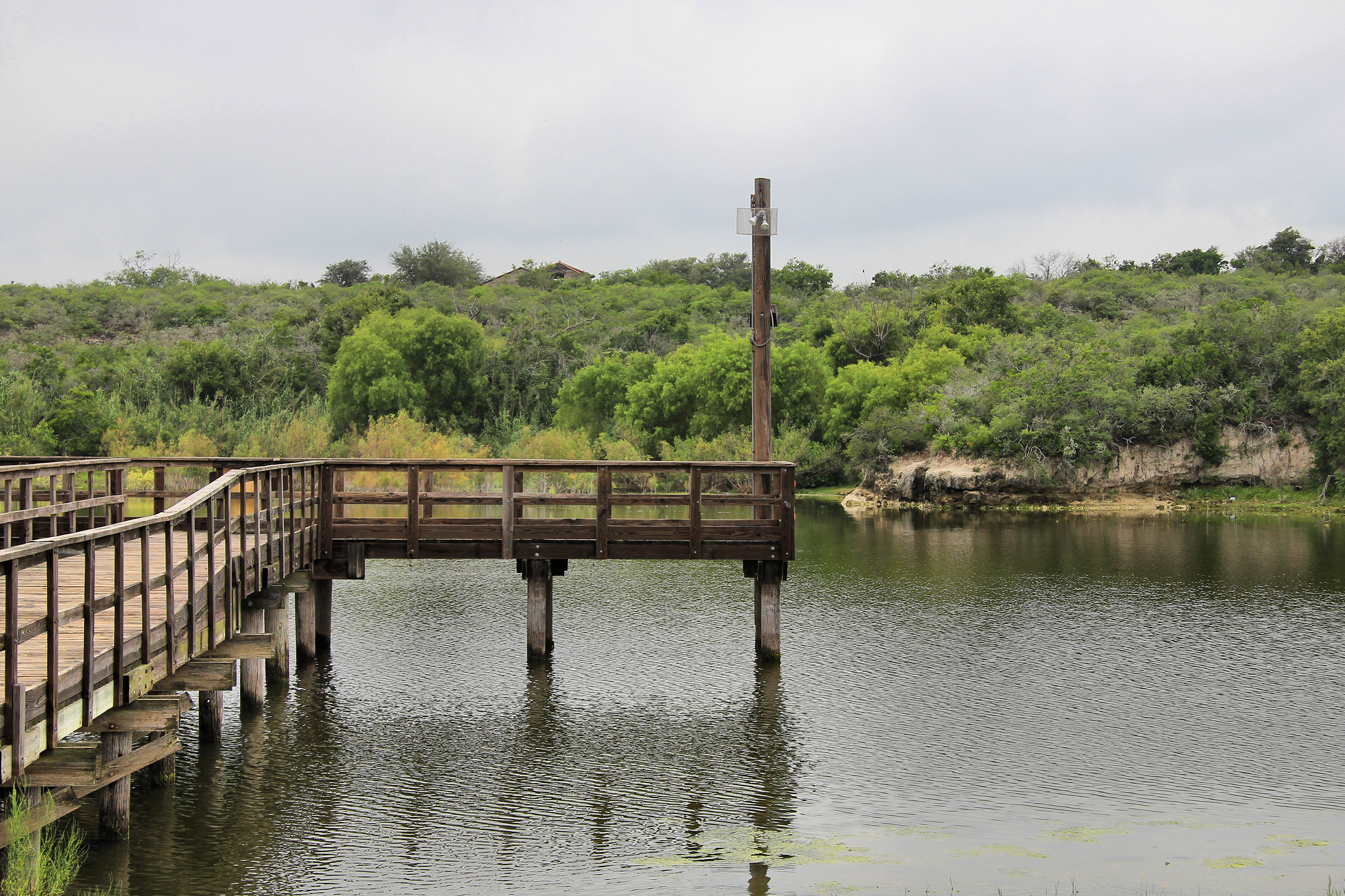
- The fishing pier at Lake Corpus Christi State Park

- Location within Texas Location within the United States
- Location: San Patricio County, Texas
- Nearest city: Mathis
- Coordinates: 28°3′48″N 97°52′26″W
- Area: 356 acres (144 ha)
- Established: 1934
- Visitors: 102,526 (in 2025)
- Governing body: Texas Parks and Wildlife Department
- Website: Official site

Lake Corpus Christi State Park is a 356 acres (144 ha) state park located on Lake Corpus Christi in San Patricio County, Texas, United States southwest of Mathis. The state leased the land from the City of Corpus Christi in 1934 and the park was opened the same year.

== History ==
The park was constructed by Civilian Conservation Corps (CCC) Company 886 between 1934 and 1935. CCC buildings included a bathhouse, park residence, boat house and a refectory, but only the refectory remains. Other CCC structures include a lookout tower, Park Road 25, and bridges.

=== Plants ===
The park is a mixture of brushlands, wetlands, woodlands and the open waters of Lake Corpus Christi creating a diverse ecological area. Documented plants in the park include honey mesquite, huisache, and anacua.

=== Animals ===
Common birds within the park include the black-bellied whistling duck, American purple gallinule, white-winged dove, pauraque, long-billed thrasher, white-eyed vireo, pyrrhuloxia and black-throated sparrow. Common mammals include javelina, cottontail rabbits and white-tailed deer. Popular fish include blue, channel and yellow catfish and sunfish, bass and crappie.

== See also ==
- List of Texas state parks
