= George Washington West =

American rancher (1851–1926)

George West
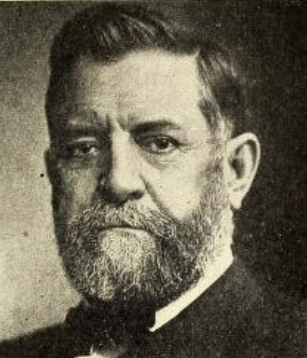
- West in a 1925 publication
- Born: George Washington West; March 10, 1851; Bath Springs, Tennessee, US
- Died: February 16, 1926 (aged 74); San Antonio, Texas, US
- Occupation: Rancher

George Washington West (March 10, 1851 – February 16, 1926) was an American rancher. He was one of the first cattlemen to drive longhorns to the Kansas railhead. He was reported to have commanded one of the longest recorded cattle drives, which started at Lavaca County, Texas and ended at the Canadian border. He founded the towns of George West and Kittie.

== Early life ==
West was born on March 10, 1851, in Bath Springs, Tennessee, to Washington West and Mary Buckwalter Willauer. In 1854, West moved his family to Lavaca County. Their home became a main stop for stagecoaches that later would help create the community of Sweet Home. He married Catherine Elizabeth "Kittie" Searcy on June 8, 1874.

== Career ==
West was one of the first to drive longhorn cattle to the Kansas railheads from 1867 until the trails closed. In 1870, he agreed to contract out with the government to deliver 14,000 head of longhorns to the Rosebud Indian Reservation in Montana. The journey started at Lavaca County, Texas and ended within 100 miles of the Canadian border. West made many drives to Kansas, Nebraska, Montana, Wyoming and the Dakotas. In 1880 with his wife Kittie, West moved to Live Oak County and purchased 140,000-acre of land and 26,000 cattle. The ranch included the present site of George West, Texas. In 1882 West had about 80,000 acres but many died due to droughts in the region, Because of the droughts West had to sell 60,000 acres to Charles Simmons, who subdivided it, held a lottery for lots, and established the town of Simmons, Texas, in 1907.

== Later life and death ==
In 1912, West turned his efforts towards development by donating $100,000 and a legal right, through his ranch to San Antonio, to Uvalde and Gulf Railroad. In 1913, West founded the town of George West. He built a $75,000 courthouse. West spent $50,000 building schools, highways, bridges, public utilities, and a hotel across from the railroad depot. In 1904 George moved to San Antonio, Texas, where he died on February 16, 1926, aged 73.
