= Three Rivers High School (Texas) =

Public school in Texas, United States

Location
- 108 North School Road; Three Rivers, Live Oak County, Texas 78071-2559; United States
- Coordinates: 28.45994°N 98.17569°W

Information
- School district: Three Rivers Independent School District
- Superintendent: Mary E. Springs
- Principal: Ross Baker
- Grades: 7-12
- Colors: Red & Black
- Athletics: UIL Class AA
- Mascot: Bulldog
- Team name: Fighting Bulldogs
- Website: trhs.trisd.org

Three Rivers High School is a high school in Three Rivers, Texas, United States. It is operated by Three Rivers Independent School District. The Three Rivers Bulldogs compete in cross country, volleyball, football, basketball, golf, tennis, track, softball & baseball. Three Rivers High School students also compete in various UIL sanctioned academic events such as speech and debate, one act play, mathematics, and writing events. They have won state titles in Boys Golf in 2003 and 2004, and in Boys Track in 1955, 1985, and 1989. In 2017, the principal reported a teacher's aide to the police for an "inappropriate relationship" with two students, leading to an arrest.
