= Three Rivers Independent School District =

School district in Texas, United States

Address
- 351 South School Road Three Rivers, Texas, 78071; United States
- Coordinates: 28.45994°N 98.17569°W

District information
- Grades: PK–12
- Schools: 2
- NCES District ID: 4842690

Students and staff
- Students: 590 (2023–2024)
- Teachers: 56.11 (on an FTE basis)
- Student–teacher ratio: 10.52:1

Other information
- Website: www.trisd.org

Three Rivers Independent School District is a public school district based in Three Rivers, Texas (USA). Located in Live Oak County, the district extends into a small portion of Bee County.

In 2009, the school district was rated "academically acceptable" by the Texas Education Agency.

== Schools ==
- Three Rivers Elementary School (Grades PK-6)
- Three Rivers JR/SR School (Grades 7-12)
