= George West, Texas =

- City
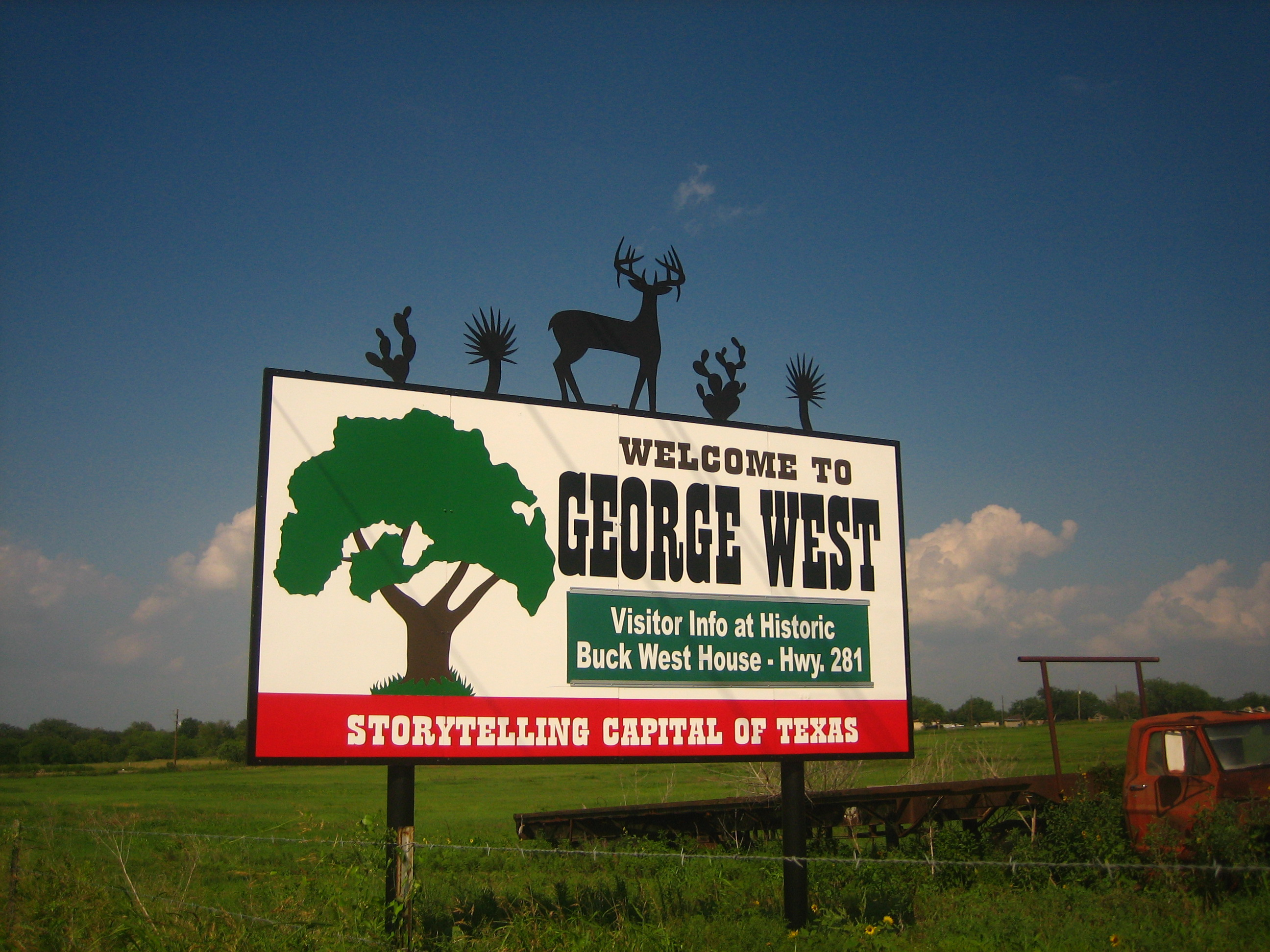
- George West entrance sign
- Nicknames: "Storytelling Capital of Texas", "Birthplace of Interstate 69 Central"
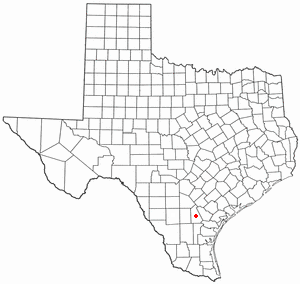
- Location of George West, Texas

- Coordinates: 28°19′52″N 98°7′1″W
- Country: United States
- State: Texas
- County: Live Oak

Government
  - Type: Mayor–council
  - Mayor: Andrew Garza

Area
  - Total: 1.94 sq mi (5.02 km^{2})
  - Land: 1.94 sq mi (5.02 km^{2})
  - Water: 0 sq mi (0.00 km^{2})
- Elevation: 157 ft (48 m)

Population (2020)
  - Total: 2,171
  - Density: 1,120/sq mi (432/km^{2})
- Time zone: UTC-6 (Central (CST))
  - Summer (DST): UTC-5 (CDT)
- ZIP code: 78022
- Area code: 361
- FIPS code: 48-29348
- GNIS feature ID: 1336484
- Website: cityofgw.org

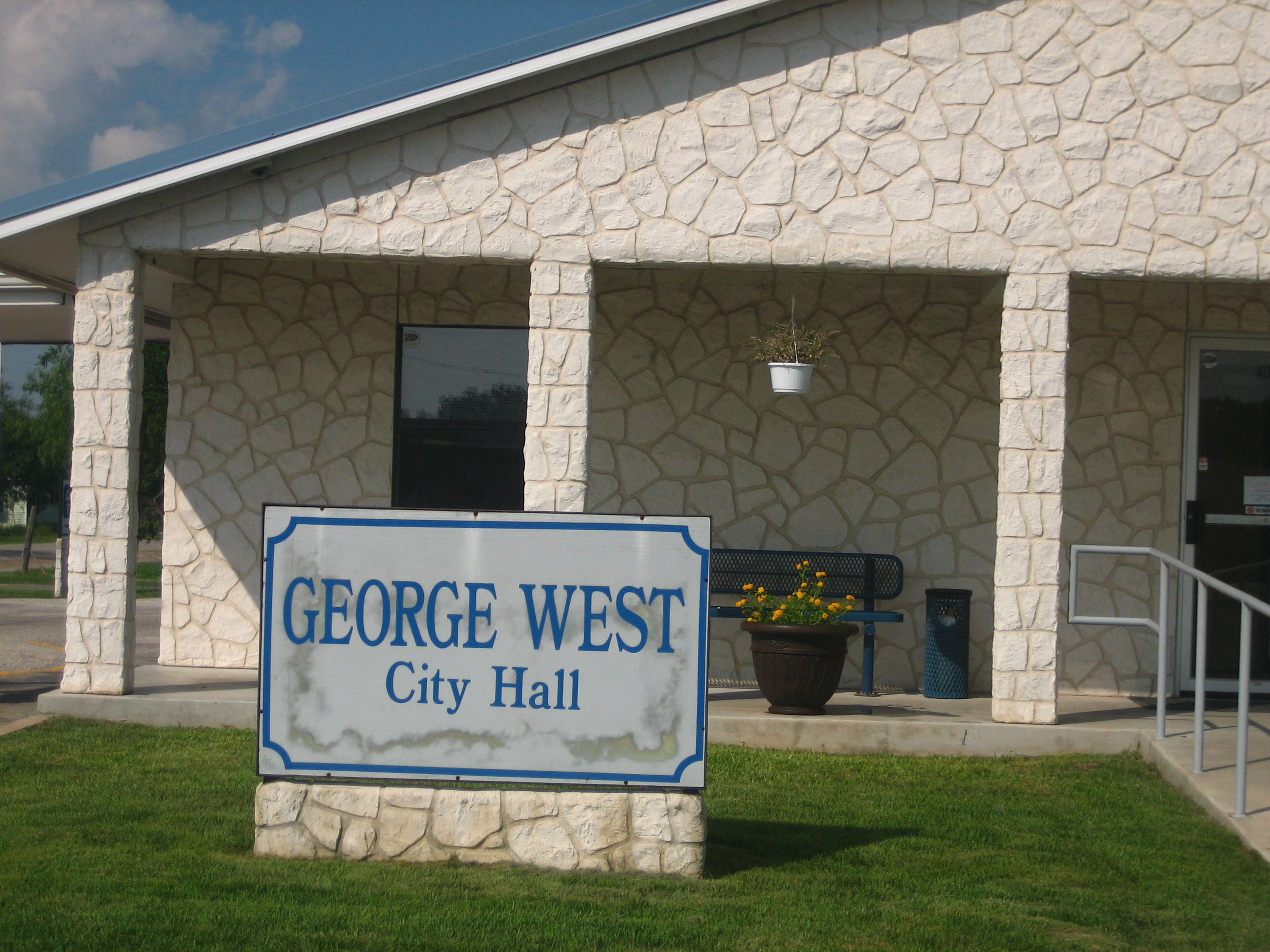
City Hall in George West

George West is a city in Live Oak County, Texas, United States, and named for cattle rancher George Washington West. The population was 2,171 at the 2020 census. It is the county seat of Live Oak County. George West was named the "storytelling capital of Texas" in 2005 by the Texas Senate; and it hosts the George West Storyfest, a festival that features storytelling, cowboy poetry, and music. Numerous ranches surround George West.

The Texas author and folklorist J. Frank Dobie was born in Live Oak County near George West in 1888. Former State Senator Cyndi Taylor Krier, also the administrative judge of Bexar County, was reared near George West in the unincorporated community of Dinero.

== History ==
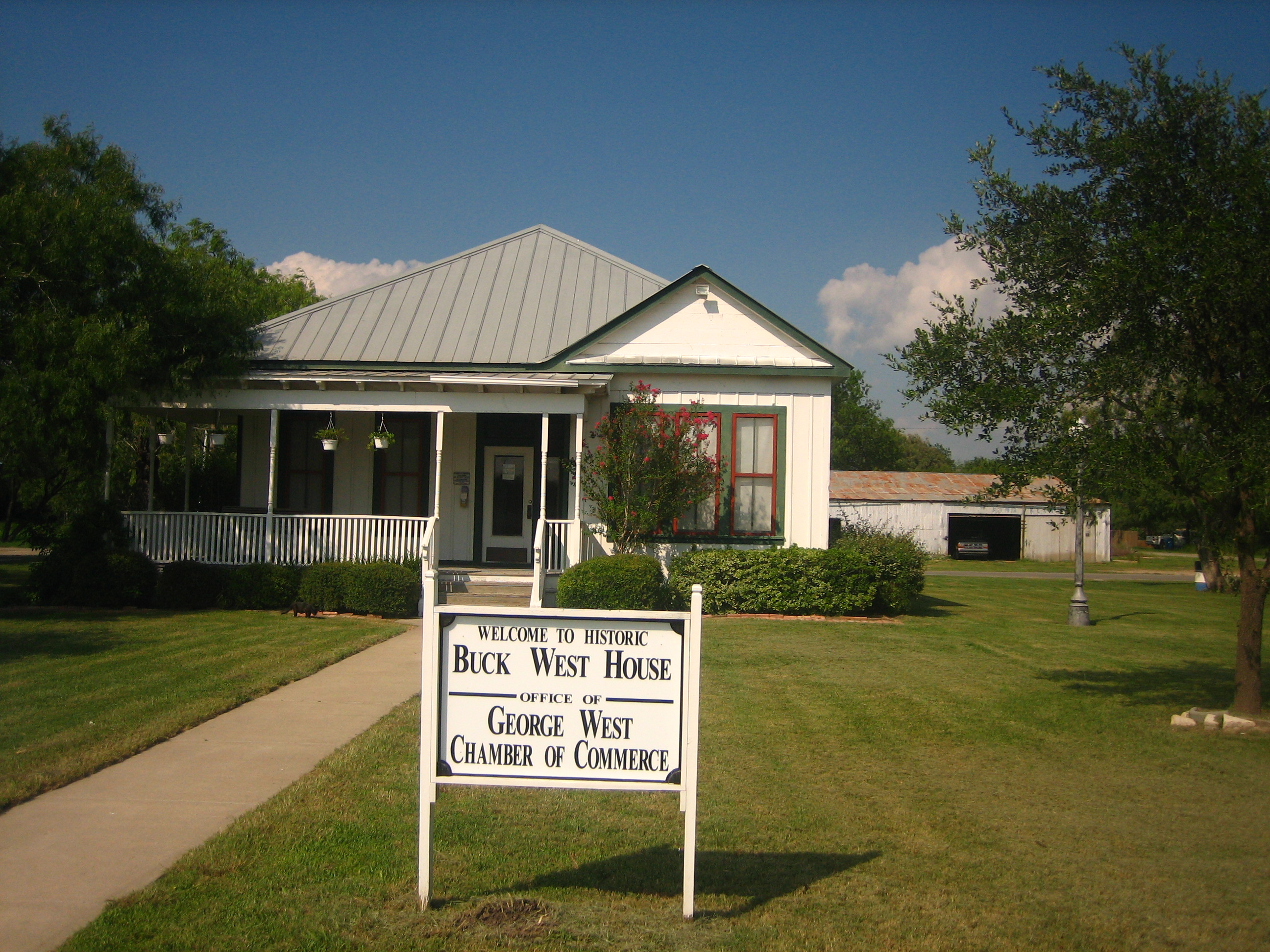
Buck West House in George West is also the chamber of commerce welcoming center

George West was a land venture and ranching enterprise of George Washington West and Kittie West. Originally from Shannonville Tennessee, West began to build his town in 1913, after ranching from 1880 to 1912 in the area between Pleasanton and Corpus Christi. He sold his cattle holdings and began to colonize some 75,000 acres (300 km^{2}).

West offered the San Antonio, Uvalde and Gulf Railroad $100,000 and a free easement through his land to build to George West. West had made his fortune on cattle drives but knew that the future rested with the transport of the animals on a train. He purchased some 120,000 acres in Live Oak County and held 26,000 cattle. A drought had caused such losses that he sold half of his acreage. Other ranchers tried to sell property at that time, and prices dropped to low levels.

In 1918, West offered $75,000 to build a new courthouse if the county seat was moved from Oakville, which was not on a railroad route, and if voters approved the plan. The courthouse actually cost $120,000 and was built to West's specifications. He also built schools, roads, and water and electricity plants.

George West was incorporated in 1946, and the government changed to home rule in 1980.

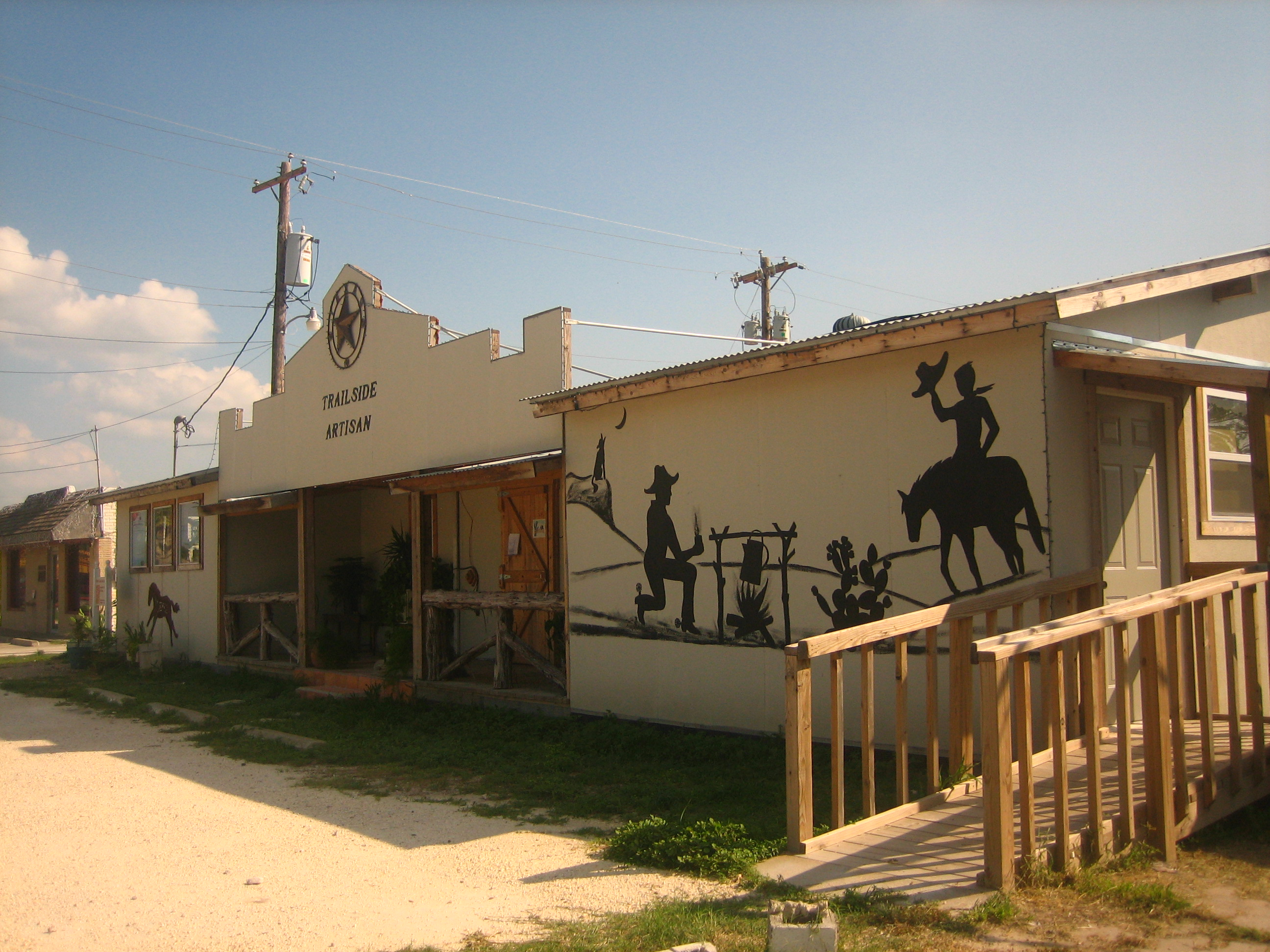
"Trailside Artisan", a business catering to Western goods and services, in George West

== Geography ==
George West is located at 28°19′52″N 98°07′01″W (28.331147, –98.117013), on the west bank of the Nueces River. This is 65.7 miles (105.7 km) northwest of Corpus Christi and (127 km) 85.6 miles south of San Antonio.

According to the United States Census Bureau, the city has a total area of 12 square miles (31 km^{2}), all land.

== Demographics ==
Historical population
Census	Pop.	Note	%±
1950	1,533		—
1960	1,878		22.5%
1970	2,022		7.7%
1980	2,627		29.9%
1990	2,586		−1.6%
2000	2,524		−2.4%
2010	2,445		−3.1%
2020	2,171		−11.2%
U.S. Decennial Census

=== 2020 census ===
As of the 2020 census, George West had a population of 2,171 and 466 families. The median age was 41.9 years.

22.4% of residents were under the age of 18 and 21.8% of residents were 65 years of age or older. For every 100 females there were 95.2 males, and for every 100 females age 18 and over there were 93.2 males age 18 and over.

0.0% of residents lived in urban areas, while 100.0% lived in rural areas.

There were 757 households in George West, of which 31.8% had children under the age of 18 living in them. Of all households, 49.0% were married-couple households, 16.2% were households with a male householder and no spouse or partner present, and 29.1% were households with a female householder and no spouse or partner present. About 26.6% of all households were made up of individuals and 12.2% had someone living alone who was 65 years of age or older.

There were 885 housing units, of which 14.5% were vacant. The homeowner vacancy rate was 3.2% and the rental vacancy rate was 14.6%.

Racial composition as of the 2020 census
Race	Number	Percent
White	1,399	64.4%
Black or African American	15	0.7%
American Indian and Alaska Native	11	0.5%
Asian	13	0.6%
Native Hawaiian and Other Pacific Islander	0	0.0%
Some other race	307	14.1%
Two or more races	426	19.6%
Hispanic or Latino (of any race)	1,346	62.0%

=== 2000 census ===
As of the census of 2000, there were 2,524 people, 892 households, and 671 families residing in the city. The population density was 1,327.3 inhabitants per square mile (512.5/km^{2}). There were 1,035 housing units at an average density of 544.3 per square mile (210.2/km^{2}). The racial makeup of the city was 82.73% White, 0.28% African American, 0.40% Native American, 0.16% Asian, 14.38% from other races, and 2.06% from two or more races. Hispanic or Latino of any race were 58.00% of the population.

There were 892 households, out of which 40.1% had children under the age of 18 living with them, 57.8% were married couples living together, 14.1% had a female householder with no husband present, and 24.7% were non-families. 22.0% of all households were made up of individuals, and 13.0% had someone living alone who was 65 years of age or older. The average household size was 2.80 and the average family size was 3.29.

In the city, the population was spread out, with 30.8% under the age of 18, 9.1% from 18 to 24, 25.8% from 25 to 44, 21.4% from 45 to 64, and 12.9% who were 65 years of age or older. The median age was 34 years. For every 100 females, there were 91.9 males. For every 100 females age 18 and over, there were 90.3 males.

The median income for a household in the city was $29,364, and the median income for a family was $33,971. Males had a median income of $28,456 versus $14,573 for females. The per capita income for the city was $13,591. About 18.2% of families and 21.1% of the population were below the poverty line, including 31.0% of those under age 18 and 13.2% of those age 65 or over.

== Education ==
The city of George West is served by the George West Independent School District.

== Climate ==
The climate in this area is characterized by hot, humid summers and generally mild to cool winters. According to the Köppen Climate Classification system, George West has a humid subtropical climate, abbreviated "Cfa" on climate maps.

== See also ==
- Live Oak County Courthouse

Other American cities with a personal name and surname as the municipal name:

- Albert Lea, Minnesota
- Ben Lomond, California
- Burkburnett, Texas
- Carol Stream, Illinois
- Edcouch, Texas
- Jim Thorpe, Pennsylvania
- Lynn Grove, Kentucky
- Phil Campbell, Alabama
- Robert Lee, Texas
