= Oakville, Texas =

- Unincorporated community
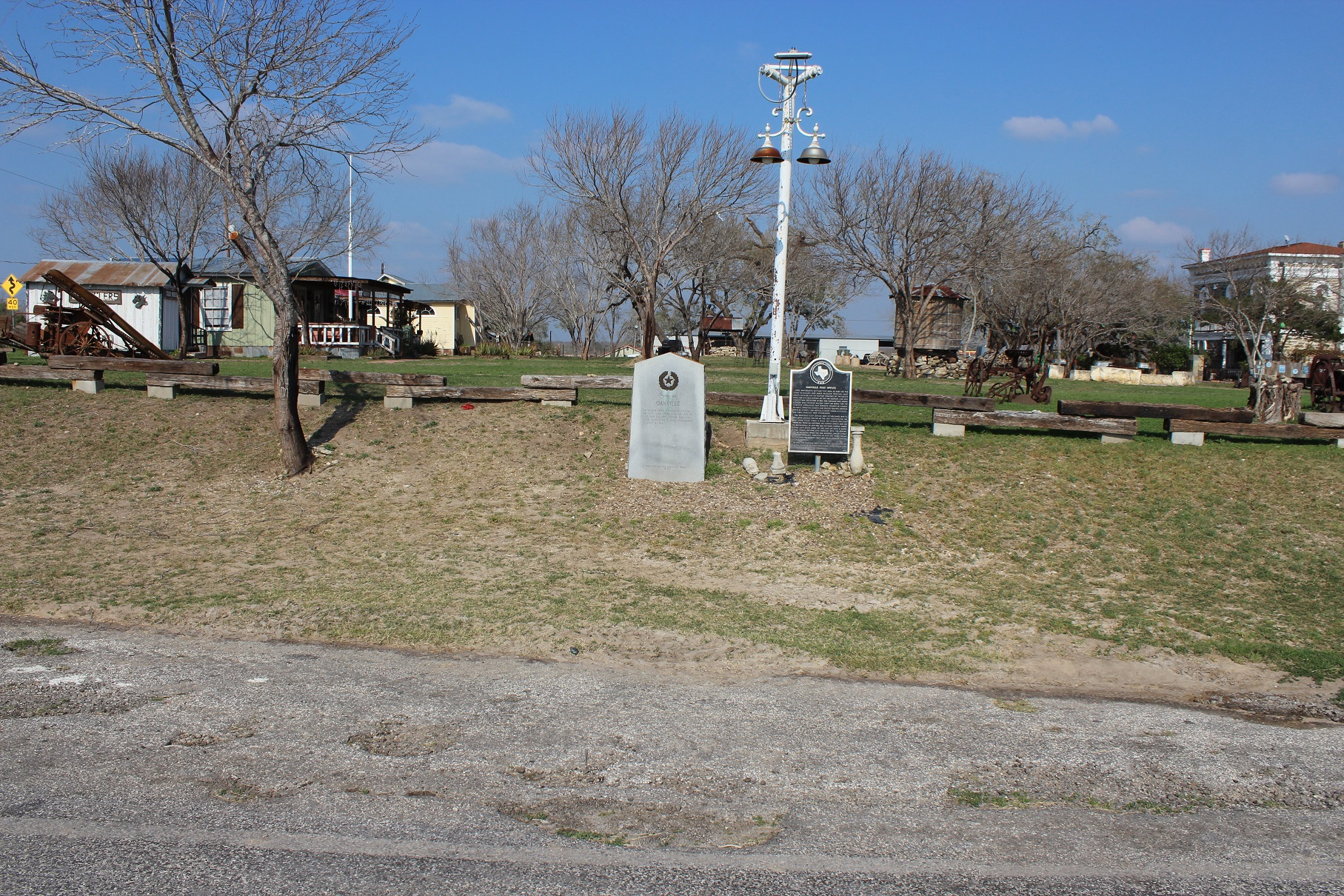
- Oakville with historic markers

- Location in Texas Location in the United States
- Coordinates: 28°26′57″N 98°6′7″W
- Country: United States
- State: Texas
- County: Live Oak
- Elevation: 171 ft (52 m)
- Time zone: UTC-6 (Central (CST))
  - Summer (DST): UTC-5 (CDT)
- ZIP codes: 78060
- GNIS feature ID: 1343034

Oakville is an unincorporated community in northeastern Live Oak County, Texas, United States. It lies along Interstate 37 northeast of the city of George West, the county seat of Live Oak County. Its elevation is 171 feet (52 m). Although Oakville is unincorporated, it has a post office, with the ZIP code of 78060.

== History ==
Oakville originated as a stagecoach station shortly after the Texas Revolution. A community was established in 1856, after a local landowner donated land; it soon became the county seat of Live Oak County, and its post office—the county's first—was established there in the following year. Originally referred to by the name of the local Sulphur Creek, it received its current name from an advertisement in a newspaper.

After the Civil War, Oakville became a local commercial center; the county's first bank and public school were established there, and the Live Oak County Leader, a newspaper, was founded in the community in 1891.

In December 1914, a group of local Mexicans came to the rescue of two compatriots, Ysidro González and Francisco Sánchez, when they were unjustly apprehended by the local law enforcement agency and a group of whites threatened to lynch them, a common occurrence at the time without due process. Harry Hinton, the Oakville jailer, was murdered as a result of the jail breakout. (He is listed on the Texas Peace Officers' Memorial in Austin.)

The town began to decline after a railroad line was built through a different part of the county in 1913, and it lost the status of county seat after a new courthouse was built in George West in 1919.

== Gallery ==
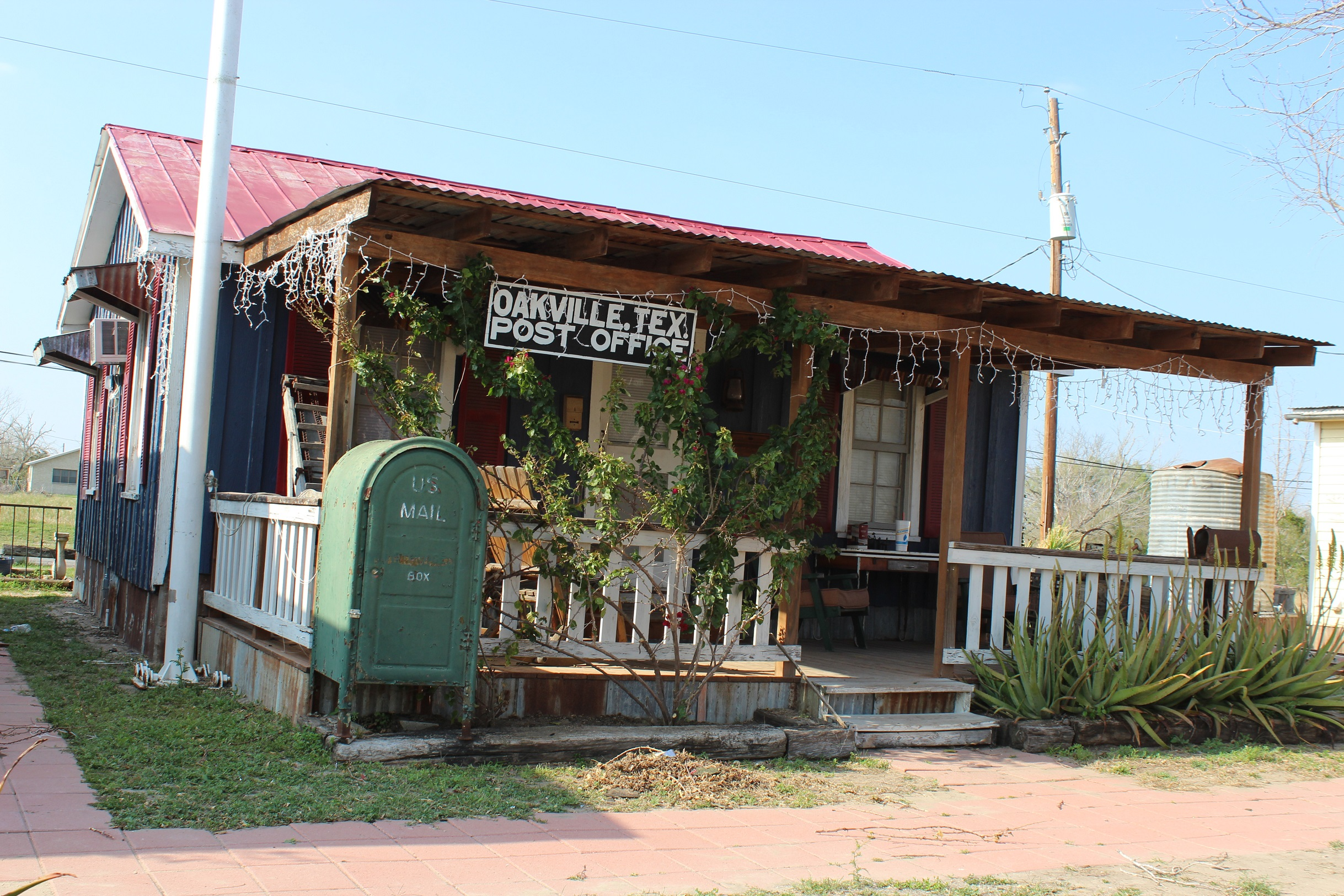
Historic Oakville post office

== See also ==
- Live Oak County Jail
