= Live Oak County Jail =

- U.S. National Register of Historic Places
- Recorded Texas Historic Landmark
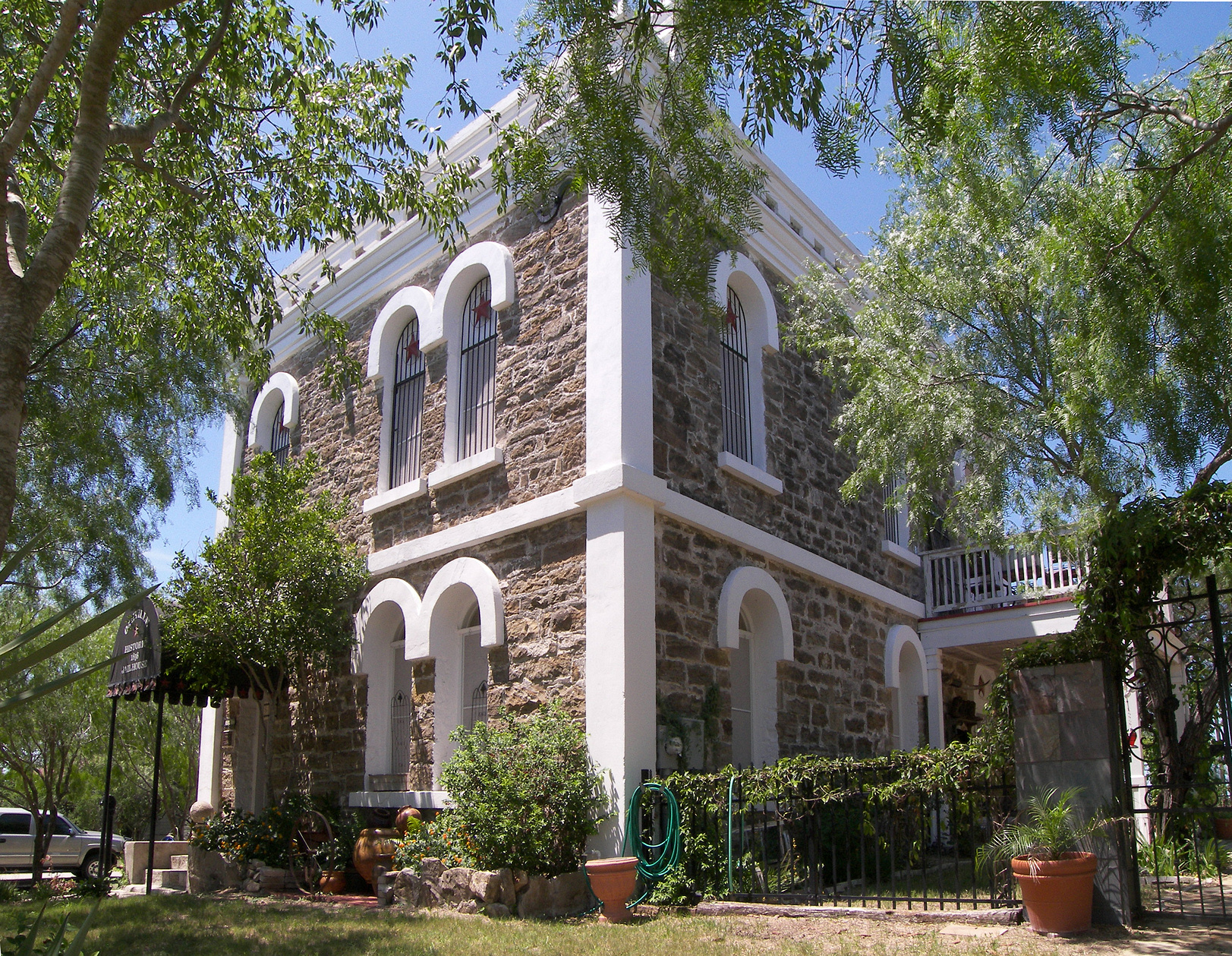
- Live Oak County Jail in 2009

- Location within Texas Location within the United States
- Location: Public square in Oakville, Oakville, Texas
- Coordinates: 28°26′56″N 98°6′5″W
- Area: less than one acre
- Built: 1886
- Built by: Diebold Lock and Safe Company
- Architectural style: Italianate
- NRHP reference No.: 04000098
- RTHL No.: 18104

Significant dates
- Added to NRHP: February 25, 2004
- Designated RTHL: 2015

The former Live Oak County Jail is located in Oakville in the U.S. state of Texas. It was added to the National Register of Historic Places in 2004. Built in 1887 by Diebold Lock and Safe Company, the native sandstone structure was the county jail until 1919. The structure is currently in private ownership.

== See also ==
- National Register of Historic Places listings in Live Oak County, Texas
- Recorded Texas Historic Landmarks in Live Oak County
