= Dinero, Texas =

- Unincorporated community
- Location in Texas Location in the United States
- Coordinates: 28°13′35″N 97°57′42″W
- Country: United States
- State: Texas
- County: Live Oak
- Elevation: 112 ft (34 m)
- Time zone: UTC-6 (Central (CST))
  - Summer (DST): UTC-5 (CDT)
- ZIP codes: 78350
- GNIS feature ID: 1334369

Dinero is an unincorporated community in eastern Live Oak County, Texas, United States. It lies along local roads south of Interstate 37, southeast of the city of George West, the county seat. Its elevation is 112 feet (34m). It once had a post office, but it was shut down in 2008 and the 78350 zip code removed.

Former State Senator Cyndi Taylor Krier spent part of her girlhood in Dinero, where her maternal grandfather and then her grandmother were the postmasters, long before the closing of the facility.
