= George West Independent School District =

School district in Texas, United States

Address
- 913 Houston Street George West, Texas, 78022; United States

District information
- Grades: PK–12
- Schools: 4
- NCES District ID: 4820550

Students and staff
- Students: 1,059 (2023–2024)
- Teachers: 80.48 (on an FTE basis)
- Student–teacher ratio: 13.16:1

Other information
- Website: www.gwisd.us

George West Independent School District is a public school district based in George West, Texas (USA).

It serves the Live Oak County portion of Pernitas Point.

In 2009, the school district was rated "academically acceptable" by the Texas Education Agency.

== Schools ==
- George West High (Grades 9–12)
- George West Junior High (Grades 7–8)
- George West Elementary (Grades 4–6)
- George West Primary (Grades PK-3)
  - 2005 National Blue Ribbon School
