= American pondweed =

American pondweed is a common name for several aquatic plants, and may refer to:

- Elodea canadensis, in the family Hydrocharitaceae, with many small leaves on a submerged stem
- Potamogeton epihydrus, in the family Potamogetonaceae, and known as "American pondweed" in the British Isles
- Potamogeton nodosus, in the family Potamogetonaceae, with large floating leaves born on elongated petioles
