= Nueces River =

River in Texas, United States

Nueces River Río de las Nueces
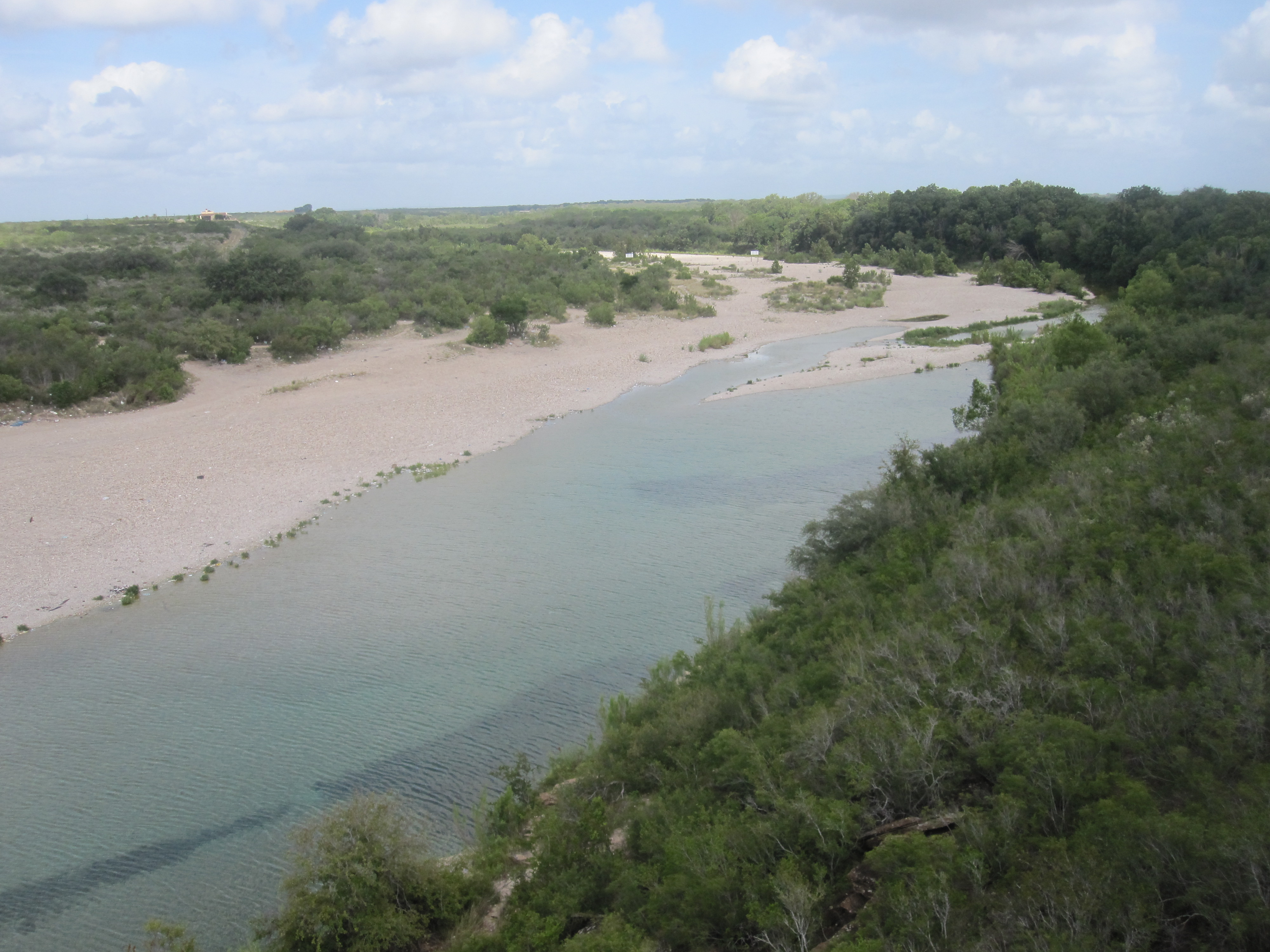
- U.S. Highway 83 crosses the Nueces River in northern Zavala County between La Pryor and Uvalde, Texas.

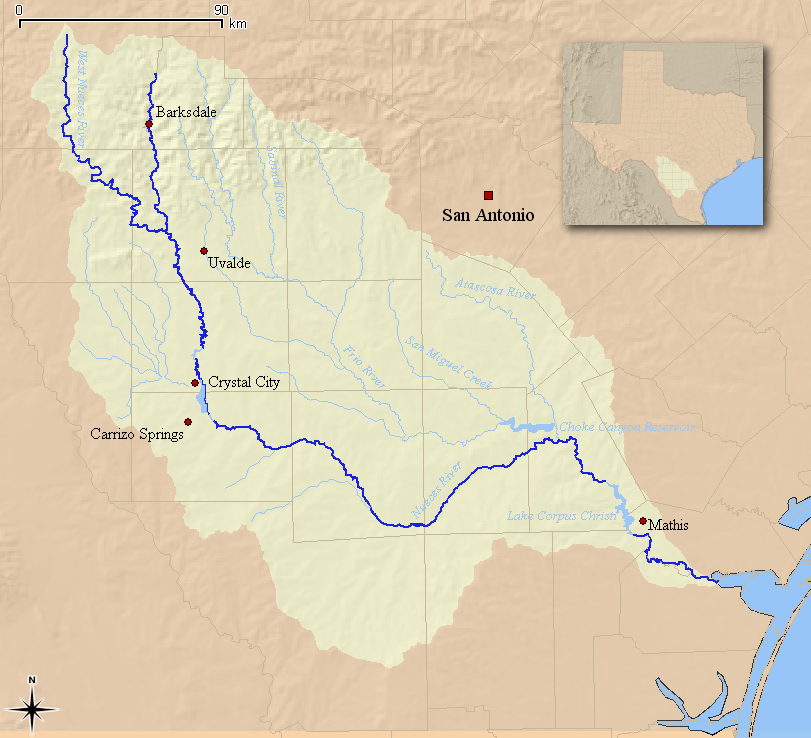
- Nueces River watershed
- Native name: Chotilapacquen (Coahuilteco)

Location
- Country: United States
- State: Texas

Physical characteristics
- Source: Edwards Plateau
- Source confluence: Hackberry Hollow
  - location: Edwards County, Texas
  - coordinates: 29°55′46″N 100°00′31″W
- Mouth: Corpus Christi Bay
  - location: Nueces County, Texas
  - coordinates: 27°50′16″N 97°29′22″W
- Length: 315 mi (507 km)
- Discharge
  - location: Northwest Corpus Christi, TX

The Nueces River (/njuˈeɪsɪs/ new-AY-siss; Spanish: Río Nueces, IPA: [ˈri.o ˈnweses]) is a river in the U.S. state of Texas, about 315 miles (507 km) long. It drains a region in central and southern Texas southeastward into the Gulf of Mexico. It is the southernmost major river in Texas northeast of the Rio Grande. Nueces is Spanish for nuts, specifically pecans; early settlers named the river after the numerous pecan trees along its banks.

== Location and flow ==
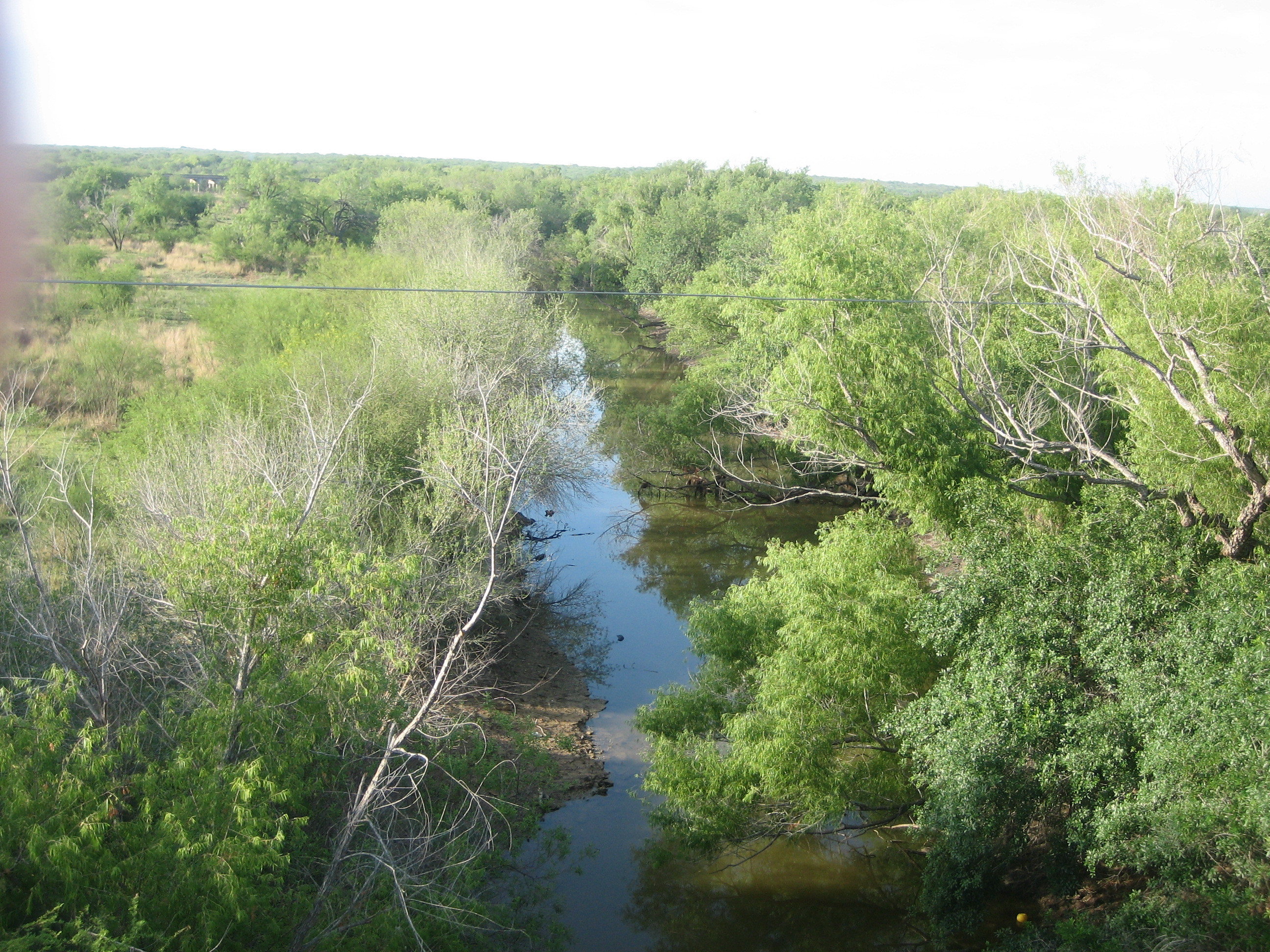
The Nueces with a low water level through Cotulla, the seat of La Salle County, Texas

The Nueces rises northwest of San Antonio in the Edwards Plateau, in Real County, roughly 50 mi (80 km) north of Uvalde. It flows south through the Texas Hill Country, past Barksdale and Crystal City, approaching to within 35 mi (56 km) of the Rio Grande on the border with Mexico. East of Carrizo Springs, it turns to the east, flowing through the scrub plains of South Texas, across rural Dimmit, La Salle, and McMullen Counties. In central Live Oak County, it is joined from the northwest at Three Rivers by the Atascosa River and Frio River, then flows southeast along the coastal plain past Mathis where it is impounded to form the Lake Corpus Christi reservoir. It enters Corpus Christi Bay on the Gulf of Mexico at Corpus Christi.

== History ==
Called Chotilapacquen by Coahuiltecan-speaking groups, the river was named "Nueces" by Alonso de León, referring to the abundant pecan tree groves. One of the first settlers to scout the area was Cpt. Blas María de la Garza Falcón in 1766. From before the end of the Texas Revolution, Mexico recognized that the Nueces River was historically the border between its states of Coahuila y Tejas and Tamaulipas. However, the Republic of Texas claimed the Rio Grande as its border with Mexico, citing the Treaty of Velasco signed by Mexican President Santa Anna, who had agreed to the Rio Grande border within Texas after having lost the Battle of San Jacinto. The area under contention between the Rio Grande and Rio Nueces was known as the Nueces Strip. This contention continued after the annexation of Texas by the United States, and was one of the causes of the Mexican–American War. The Treaty of Guadalupe Hidalgo ended the dispute, with Mexico—while under American occupation—recognizing the Rio Grande as its northern border.

Since the early 1800s, there have been rumors of lost Spanish mines in the vicinity of the Nueces River. These claims are based on the presence of two missions established in the region during the mid-1700s: San Lorenzo de la Santa Cruz and Nuestra Senora de la Candelaria, the latter of which was located near the present-day ghost town of Montell.

On August 10, 1862, pro-Union Germans from the Texas Hill Country trying to flee to Mexico were ambushed and killed by Confederates—the Nueces massacre.

== Fishing ==
The Nueces is one of several clear, warm-water spring creeks in the Hill Country of Texas. In its upper reaches, the water is clear and cool.

Unlike spring trout creeks in the Rocky Mountains, the Nueces holds largemouth bass, smallmouth bass, and the native Guadalupe bass, along with a variety of panfish such as redbreast sunfish, rock bass, green sunfish, and Rio Grande perch. The American alligator also inhabits the Nueces River.

== Paleontology ==
The Nueces River contains a rich Rancholabrean fauna of Animals

Carnivorans
Genus	Species
Aenocyon	A. dirus
Panthera	P. atrox
Smilodon	S. fatalis
Arctodus	A. simus
Homotherium	H. serum

Xenarthrans
Genus	Species
Eremotherium	E. lauriladdi
Glyptotherium	G. cylindricum
Holmesina	H. septenriolis
Megalonyx	M. jeffersoni
Paramylodon	P. harlani

Ungulates
Genus	Species
Camelops	C. hesternus
Equus (genus)	Equus sp.
Tapirus	T. veroensis
Hemiauchenia	H. sp
Bison	B. latifrons B. antiquss

Probiscideans
Genus	Species
Mammuthus	M. columbi
Mammut	M. americanum
Cuvieronius	C. sp.

== See also ==
- Fly fishing
- List of Texas rivers
- Nueces Bay
- Nueces County, Texas
