= Live Oak County, Texas =

County in Texas, United States

- County
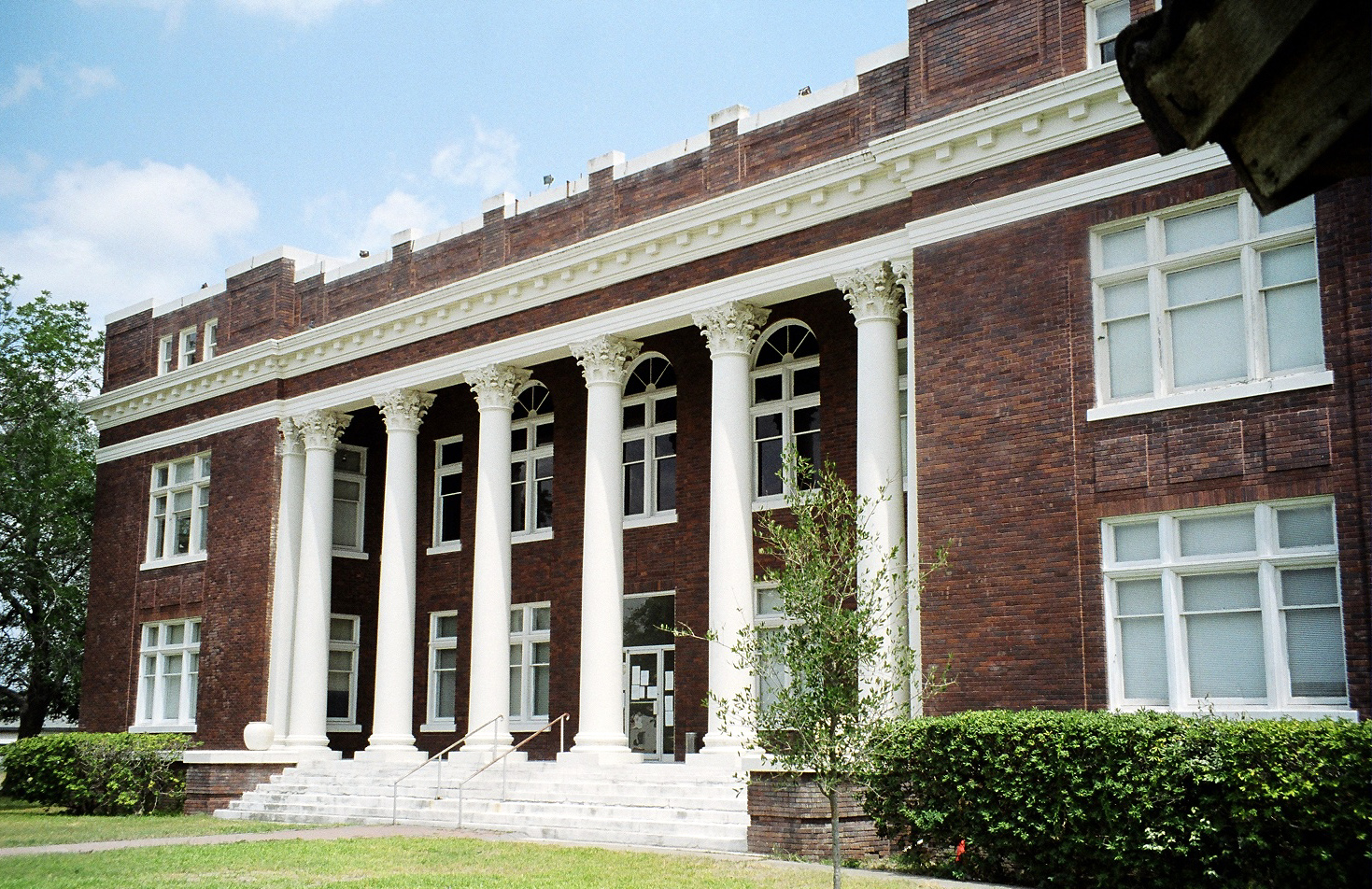
- The Live Oak County Courthouse in George West

- Location within the U.S. state of Texas
- Coordinates: 28°21′N 98°08′W
- Country: United States
- State: Texas
- Founded: 1856
- Named for: Groves of live oak
- Seat: George West
- Largest city: George West

Area
  - Total: 1,079 sq mi (2,790 km^{2})
  - Land: 1,040 sq mi (2,700 km^{2})
  - Water: 39 sq mi (100 km^{2}) 3.6%

Population (2020)
  - Total: 11,335
  - Estimate (2025): 11,929 ▲
  - Density: 11/sq mi (4.2/km^{2})
- Time zone: UTC−6 (Central)
  - Summer (DST): UTC−5 (CDT)
- Congressional district: 15th
- Website: www.co.live-oak.tx.us

Live Oak County is a county in the U.S. state of Texas. It was named for its native groves of live oak. George West is its county seat. Its population was 11,335 in the 2020 census.

== Geography ==
According to the U.S. Census Bureau, the county has a total area of 1,079 square miles (2,790 km^{2}), of which 39 sq mi (100 km^{2}) (3.6%) are covered by water. It is home to the Choke Canyon Reservoir.

=== Major highways ===
- I-37
- Future I-69W / US 59
- Future I-69C
- US 281
  - US 281 Alt.
- SH 72

=== Adjacent counties ===
- Karnes County (northeast)
- Bee County (east)
- San Patricio County (southeast)
- Jim Wells County (south)
- Duval County (southwest)
- McMullen County (west)
- Atascosa County (northwest)

== Demographics ==
Historical population
Census	Pop.	Note	%±
1860	593		—
1870	852		43.7%
1880	1,994		134.0%
1890	2,055		3.1%
1900	2,268		10.4%
1910	3,442		51.8%
1920	4,171		21.2%
1930	8,956		114.7%
1940	9,799		9.4%
1950	9,054		−7.6%
1960	7,846		−13.3%
1970	6,697		−14.6%
1980	9,606		43.4%
1990	9,556		−0.5%
2000	12,309		28.8%
2010	11,531		−6.3%
2020	11,335		−1.7%
2025 (est.)	11,929	▲	5.2%
U.S. Decennial Census; 1850–2010 2020

=== Racial and ethnic composition ===
Live Oak County, Florida – Racial and ethnic composition Note: the US Census treats Hispanic/Latino as an ethnic category. This table excludes Latinos from the racial categories and assigns them to a separate category. Hispanics/Latinos may be of any race.
Race / Ethnicity (NH = Non-Hispanic)	Pop 1980	Pop 1990	Pop 2000	Pop 2010	Pop 2020	% 1980	% 1990	% 2000	% 2010	% 2020
White alone (NH)	6,482	6,158	7,199	6,805	5,968	67.48%	64.44%	58.49%	59.01%	52.65%
Black or African American alone (NH)	5	3	281	453	205	0.05%	0.03%	2.28%	3.93%	1.81%
Native American or Alaska Native alone (NH)	20	30	30	62	49	0.21%	0.31%	0.24%	0.54%	0.43%
Asian alone (NH)	12	17	23	56	35	0.12%	0.18%	0.19%	0.49%	0.31%
Native Hawaiian or Pacific Islander alone (NH)	x	x	2	3	3	x	x	0.02%	0.03%	0.03%
Other race alone (NH)	10	24	4	9	45	0.10%	0.25%	0.03%	0.08%	0.40%
Mixed race or Multiracial (NH)	x	x	87	83	240	x	x	0.71%	0.72%	2.12%
Hispanic or Latino (any race)	3,077	3,324	4,683	4,060	4,790	32.03%	34.78%	38.05%	35.21%	42.26%
Total	9,606	9,556	12,309	11,531	11,335	100.00%	100.00%	100.00%	100.00%	100.00%

=== 2020 census ===
As of the 2020 census, the county had a population of 11,335. The median age was 44.4 years; 18.0% of residents were under the age of 18 and 21.6% were 65 years of age or older. For every 100 females there were 129.3 males, and for every 100 females age 18 and over there were 133.6 males age 18 and over.

The racial makeup of the county was 74.3% White, 1.9% Black or African American, 0.6% American Indian and Alaska Native, 0.3% Asian, <0.1% Native Hawaiian and Pacific Islander, 6.5% from some other race, and 16.4% from two or more races. Hispanic or Latino residents of any race comprised 42.3% of the population.

<0.1% of residents lived in urban areas, while 100.0% lived in rural areas.

There were 4,067 households in the county, of which 26.0% had children under the age of 18 living in them. Of all households, 50.5% were married-couple households, 21.4% were households with a male householder and no spouse or partner present, and 22.8% were households with a female householder and no spouse or partner present. About 29.1% of all households were made up of individuals and 14.5% had someone living alone who was 65 years of age or older.

There were 5,927 housing units, of which 31.4% were vacant. Among occupied housing units, 79.8% were owner-occupied and 20.2% were renter-occupied. The homeowner vacancy rate was 2.3% and the rental vacancy rate was 24.4%.

=== 2000 census ===
As of the 2000 census, 12,309 people, 4,230 households, and 3,070 families were residing in the county. The population density was 12 people per square mile (4.6 people/km^{2}). The 6,196 housing units had an average density of 6 units per square mile (2.3/km^{2}). The racial makeup of the county was 87.28% White, 2.45% African American, 0.41% Native American, 0.19% Asian, 7.74% from other races, and 1.94% from two or more races. About 38.05% of the population were Hispanics or Latinos of any race.

Of the 4,230 households, 30.9% had children under 18 living with them, 60.1% were married couples living together, 8.7% had a female householder with no husband present, and 27.4% were not families. About 23.9% of all households were made up of individuals, and 12.4% had someone living alone who was 65 or older. The average household size was 2.53 and the average family size was 3.00.

In the county, the age distribution was 22.3% under 18, 9.5% from 18 to 24, 27.1% from 25 to 44, 25.1% from 45 to 64, and 16.0% who were 65 or older. The median age was 39 years. For every 100 females, there were 122.2 males. For every 100 females 18 and over, there were 129.8 males.

The median income for a household in the county was $32,057 and for a family was $38,235. Males had a median income of $30,061 versus $19,665 for females. The per capita income for the county was $15,886. About 14.1% of families and 16.5% of the population were below the poverty line, including 22.2% of those under 18 and 11.7% of those 65 or over.

== Government and infrastructure ==
The Federal Bureau of Prisons, Federal Correctional Institution, Three Rivers, is located in unincorporated Live Oak County near Three Rivers.

=== Politics ===
Live Oak County voted predominantly Democratic at the presidential level during the first half of the 20th century. Native son Dwight D. Eisenhower’s 1952 win was an exception. Jimmy Carter in 1976, however, was the last Democratic presidential candidate to carry the county, with Republicans winning since 1980.

United States presidential election results for Live Oak County, Texas
Year	Republican		Democratic		Third party(ies)	
Year	No.	%	No.	%	No.	%
1912	26	6.52%	308	77.19%	65	16.29%
1916	119	20.73%	397	69.16%	58	10.10%
1920	161	32.46%	234	47.18%	101	20.36%
1924	323	31.92%	596	58.89%	93	9.19%
1928	484	55.82%	383	44.18%	0	0.00%
1932	114	9.56%	1,070	89.77%	8	0.67%
1936	231	20.17%	874	76.33%	40	3.49%
1940	499	35.90%	888	63.88%	3	0.22%
1944	548	39.00%	642	45.69%	215	15.30%
1948	479	30.57%	945	60.31%	143	9.13%
1952	1,443	71.22%	573	28.28%	10	0.49%
1956	1,077	65.71%	521	31.79%	41	2.50%
1960	1,048	57.52%	770	42.26%	4	0.22%
1964	795	35.71%	1,423	63.93%	8	0.36%
1968	938	40.02%	922	39.33%	484	20.65%
1972	1,745	73.97%	610	25.86%	4	0.17%
1976	1,287	43.47%	1,656	55.93%	18	0.61%
1980	2,193	60.61%	1,380	38.14%	45	1.24%
1984	2,481	66.00%	1,260	33.52%	18	0.48%
1988	2,277	58.69%	1,573	40.54%	30	0.77%
1992	1,805	45.52%	1,345	33.92%	815	20.55%
1996	1,929	53.41%	1,372	37.98%	311	8.61%
2000	2,828	70.63%	1,114	27.82%	62	1.55%
2004	3,147	74.91%	1,036	24.66%	18	0.43%
2008	3,095	74.11%	1,048	25.10%	33	0.79%
2012	3,154	76.68%	919	22.34%	40	0.97%
2016	3,464	80.52%	742	17.25%	96	2.23%
2020	4,199	83.07%	819	16.20%	37	0.73%
2024	4,307	84.57%	761	14.94%	25	0.49%

United States Senate election results for Live Oak County, Texas1
Year	Republican		Democratic		Third party(ies)	
Year	No.	%	No.	%	No.	%
2024	4,165	77.78%	1,115	20.82%	75	1.40%

United States Senate election results for Live Oak County, Texas2
Year	Republican		Democratic		Third party(ies)	
Year	No.	%	No.	%	No.	%
2020	4,122	82.75%	790	15.86%	69	1.39%

Texas Gubernatorial election results for Live Oak County
Year	Republican		Democratic		Third party(ies)	
Year	No.	%	No.	%	No.	%
2022	3,424	85.60%	545	13.63%	31	0.78%

== Communities ==
=== Cities ===
- George West (county seat)
- Three Rivers

=== Village ===
- Pernitas Point (small part in Jim Wells County)

=== Unincorporated communities ===
- Dinero
- Oakville
- Ray Point
- Swinney Switch
- Whitsett
- Clegg

=== Ghost town ===
- Lebanon

== Education ==
School districts include:

- George West Independent School District
- Mathis Independent School District
- Three Rivers Independent School District

Coastal Bend College (formerly Bee County College) is the county's designated community college.

== See also ==
- National Register of Historic Places listings in Live Oak County, Texas
- Recorded Texas Historic Landmarks in Live Oak County
- Live Oak County Courthouse
- Live Oak County Jail
