= Texas Coastal Bend =

Geographical region in Texas, USA

Coordinates: 28.4°N 96.4°W

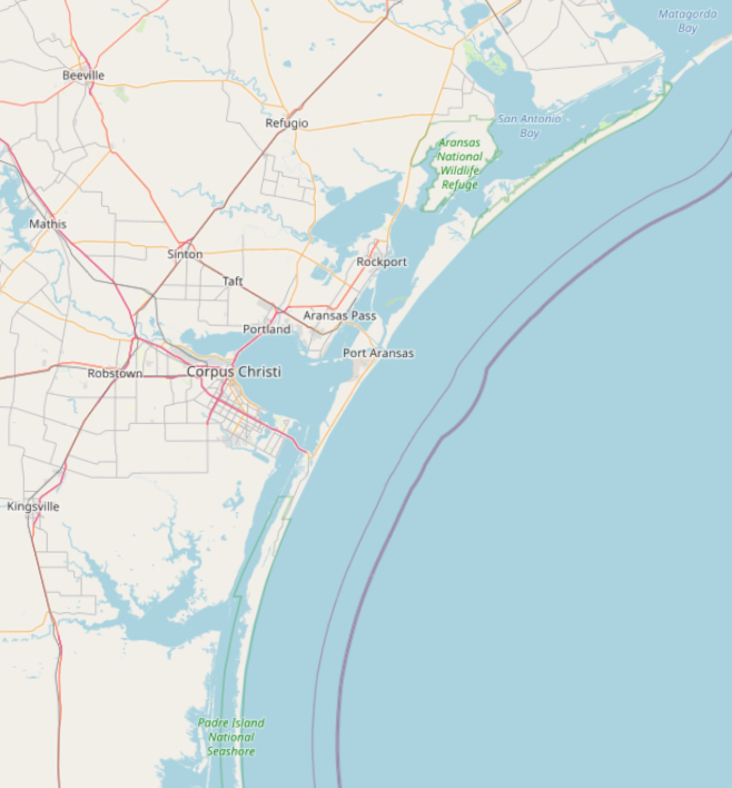
Texas Coastal Bend illustration bordering the Gulf of Mexico

The Texas Coastal Bend, or just the Coastal Bend, is a geographical region in the US state of Texas. The name refers to the area being a curve along the Texas Gulf Coast of the Gulf of Mexico. The largest city of the Coastal Bend is Corpus Christi. It includes the Nueces Estuary (Corpus Christi Bay) and the Mission–Aransas Estuary (Aransas Bay), as well as part of Laguna Madre. The coastline is paralleled by several of the Texas barrier islands, including North Padre Island, Mustang Island, and San José Island.

While the Coastal Bend traditionally consists of 9 counties: Aransas, Bee, Brooks, Jim Wells, Kenedy, Kleberg, Nueces, Refugio, and San Patricio counties, the Coastal Bend Council of Governments officially consists of 11 counties, which would add Duval and Live Oak to its jurisdiction.

== Nature ==
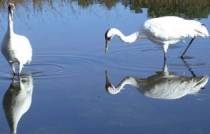
The whooping crane.

The Coastal Bend is a habitat for many types of vegetation and wildlife. Aransas National Wildlife Refuge is among the most prominent centers for wildlife in the United States. Wildlife found in the area includes the rare whooping crane, American alligator, Mexican long-nosed armadillo, West Indian manatee, and numerous other species of wildlife.

The Texas Coastal Bend is an area of demarcation between ranges of various vegetative species. For example, the California fan palm (Washingtonia filifera) is found only west of the Texas Coastal Bend, or more specifically the Balcones Fault.

== Estuaries ==
Two of the major estuary systems of Texas are found along the coastal bend: the Nueces Estuary (Corpus Christi Bay) and the Mission–Aransas Estuary (Aransas Bay). The United States Environmental Protection Agency has designated these Texas Coastal Bend Estuaries as an estuary system of national significance under the National Estuary Program.

== Recreation and tourism ==
The Coastal Bend is a major destination for tourism, water recreation, and nature exploration.

=== Beaches ===
==== National and state parks ====
- Padre Island National Seashore
- Mustang Island State Park

==== Local beaches ====
- North Packery Channel Beach
- Michael J. Ellis Beach & Seawall
- Whitecap Beach
- Padre Balli Park
- South Packery Channel Beach
- Newport Pass Beach
- North Beach
- McGee Beach
- Rockport Beach

=== Nature and hiking trails ===
==== Preserves and refuges ====
- Oso Bay Wetlands Preserve
- Aransas National Wildlife Refuge Trails
- Hans and Pat Suter Wildlife Refuge

==== Botanical and wildlife parks ====
- South Texas Botanical Gardens and Nature Center
- Grasslands Nature Trail
- Hazel Bazemore County Park
- Charlie's Pasture
- Blucher Park
- Lake Corpus Christi State Park

== Government ==
Government in the Coastal Bend consists of federal, state, regional, and county representation. These structures of government work together to ensure that the Coastal Bend region's needs are addressed at every level of policy-making.

=== Federal and state representation ===
The U.S. Congress and the Texas Legislature represent the United States and Texas, respectively. The Coastal Bend is in both federal and state jurisdiction and, therefore, is represented by them.

==== Federal ====
The U.S. Congressional Districts in the area are primarily represented by Texas's 27th Congressional District. This district includes the Coastal Bend counties of Aransas, Bee, Nueces, Refugio, and San Patricio. This district has been represented by Michael Cloud (Republican) since July 10, 2018. Like all of Texas, the region is represented by U.S. Senators John Cornyn (Republican), since 2002, and Ted Cruz (Republican), since 2013.

==== State ====
The Texas Legislature meets every two years, only in odd-numbered years for up to 140 days. It is a bicameral chamber consisting of the Senate and the House of Representatives.

The Senate is the upper chamber of the Legislature, consisting of 31 members, each serving four-year terms. Every member represents a specific geographical area. The Lieutenant Governor is elected by the people and presides over the Senate.

The Texas House of Representatives consists of 150 members, each representing a smaller district than the Senate. The House of Representatives is the lower chamber of the Legislature, and members are up for election more frequently than those in the Senate, each serving two-year terms. The Speaker of the House is elected by the members of the House of Representatives and presides over them.

=== Regional representation ===
Established in 1966, the primary administration for the 11-county Coastal Bend region is the Coastal Bend Council of Governments. The Coastal Bend's government is a voluntary association of local authorities that coordinate with each other on regional issues such as emergency management, transportation, and economic development. While they do not have taxing authority or police powers, they are governed by a board of directors, each one from every designated county. They are specifically responsible for several regional programs that include 911 emergency systems, homeland security, economic/community development, and providing services for senior citizens and people with disabilities.

=== County representation ===
Each of the 11 counties recognized by the Coastal Bend Council of Governments is governed by a Commissioners Court. This court is led by a County Judge, who serves as the chief administrator, alongside four County Commissioners.

County	2026 County Judge
Aransas	Ray A. Garza
Bee	George (Trace) Morrill III
Brooks	Eric Ramos
Duval	Arnoldo Cantu
Jim Wells	Pedro "Pete" Trevino, Jr.
Kenedy	Charles Burns
Kleburg	Rudy Madrid
Live Oak	James Liska
Nueces	Connie Scott
Refugio	Jhiela "Gigi" Poynter
San Patricio	David R. Krebs

== See also ==
- Geography of Texas
- List of geographical regions in Texas
- List of regions of the United States#Texas
