= List of tallest buildings in Corpus Christi =

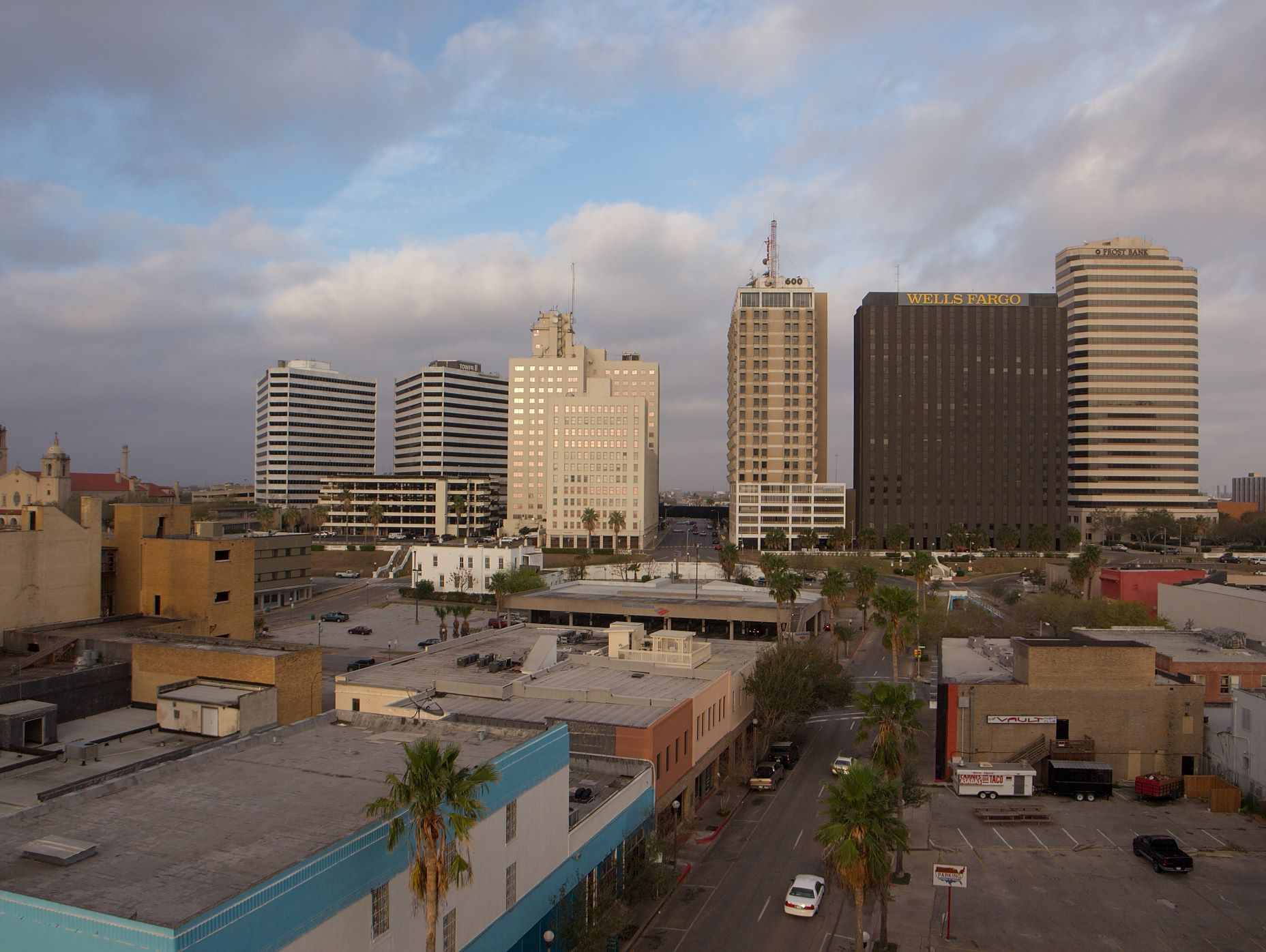
Downtown Corpus Christi

This list of tallest buildings in Corpus Christi ranks high-rises in the U.S. city of Corpus Christi, Texas by height. The tallest building in Corpus Christi is the 28-story One Shoreline Plaza South Tower, which rises 411 feet (125 m) and was completed in 1988. It also stands as the tallest building in Texas south of San Antonio. The building is located on a complex which also contains the second tallest building in the city at 375 feet (114 m). The third tallest building is the Frost Bank Plaza. It stood as the city's tallest building from 1983 to 1988.

The history of skyscrapers in Corpus Christi began with the construction of the Wilson Plaza East Building in 1927, formerly known as the Wilson Tower. Most of Corpus Christi's tall buildings are located downtown; however, there are some high-rises scattered throughout other areas of the city. Overall, Corpus Christi has 11 structures over 50 m (164 ft). However, no Corpus Christi buildings are among the tallest in the United States.

As of April 2011, there are no skyscrapers under construction or being proposed in Corpus Christi.

== Tallest buildings ==
This lists ranks Corpus Christi high-rises that stand at least 165 feet (50 m) tall, based on standard height measurement. An equal sign (=) following a rank indicates the same height between two or more buildings. The "Year" column indicates the year in which a building was completed.

Rank	Name	Image	Height ft / m	Floors	Year	Notes
1	One Shoreline Plaza (South Tower)	The South Tower as viewed from ground level.	411 / 125	28	1988	The tallest building in Texas south of San Antonio
2	One Shoreline Plaza (North Tower)	The North Tower as viewed from the South Tower.	375 / 114	22	1988	
3	802NC (formerly Frost Bank Plaza, originally Texas Commerce Plaza)		336 / 102	23	1983	Tallest building in Corpus Christi from 1983-1988.
4	Broadway Tower		280 / 86	20	1942	Tallest building in Corpus Christi from 1942-1983.
5	Wilson Plaza West		273 / 83	21	1951	
6	600 Building		248 / 76	21	1962	
7	American Bank Plaza		233 / 71	17	1963	
8	Omni Bayfront Tower		226 / 69	20	1985	
9	Tower II		223 / 68	16	1988	
10	AEP Texas Tower		222 / 68	16	1988	
11	Washington Mutual Building		201 / 61	13	1988	
12	Nueces County Courthouse		165 / 50	10	1978	

== See also ==
- List of tallest buildings in Amarillo
- List of tallest buildings in Austin
- List of tallest buildings in Dallas
- List of tallest buildings in El Paso
- List of tallest buildings in Fort Worth
- List of tallest buildings in Houston
- List of tallest buildings in Lubbock
