= Nixon Building =

Nixon Building may refer to:

- Richard Nixon Presidential Library and Museum, Yorba Linda, California, United States
- Nixon Block RR24A at Hatley Park National Historic Site, Colwood, British Columbia, Canada
- Wilson Plaza, Corpus Christi, Texas, United States, originally known as the Nixon Building
- National Bank of Whittier Building, Wittier, California, United States, now called Nixon Plaza
