= Corpus Christi Bay =

Estuary bay on the Texas coast

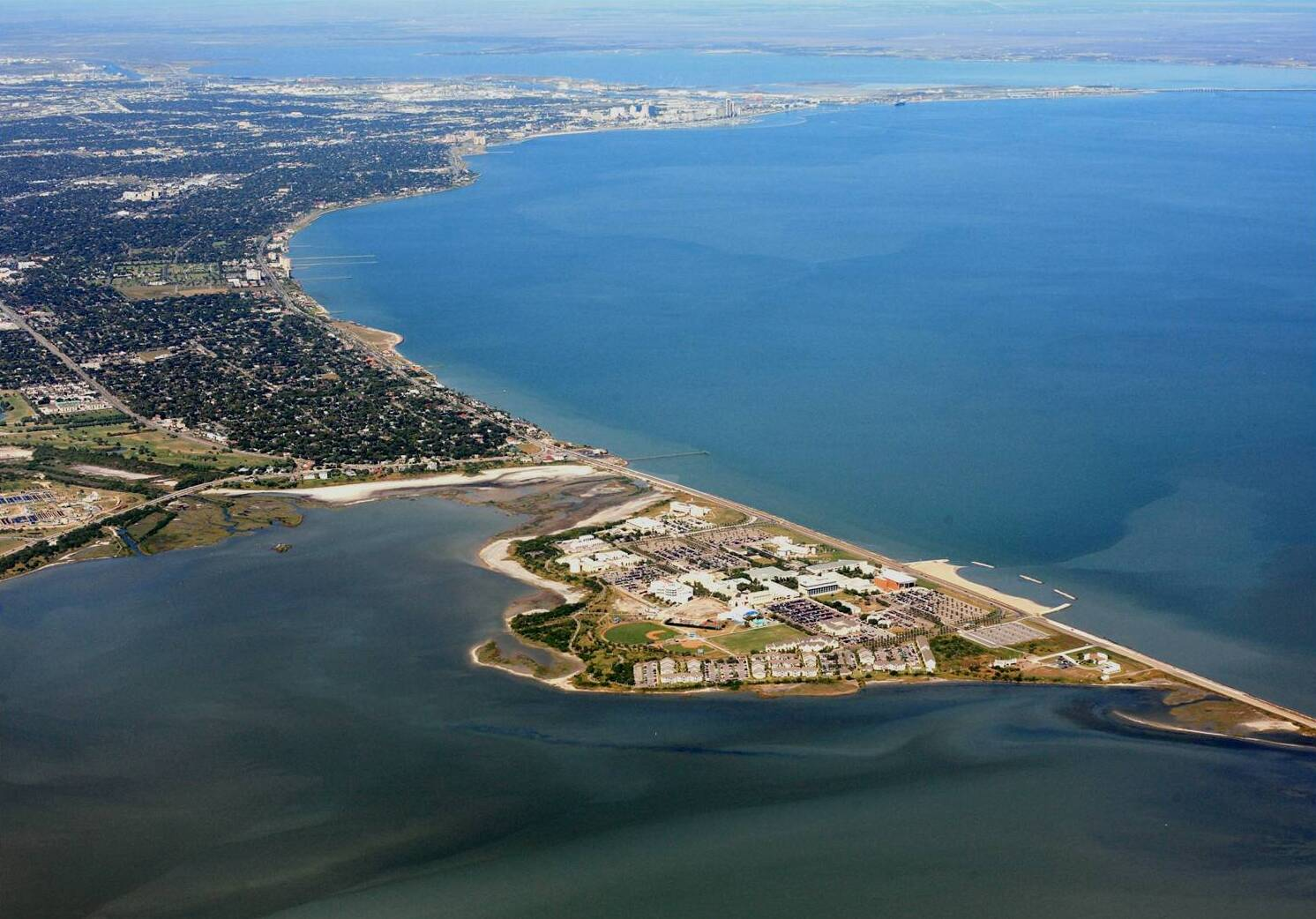
- Corpus Christi Bay (right), Nueces Bay (top), and Oso Bay (bottom)

- Location within Texas
- Location: South Texas Gulf Coast
- Coordinates: 27°46′20″N 97°15′10″W
- River sources: Nueces River, Oso Creek
- Ocean/sea sources: Gulf of Mexico
- Basin countries: United States
- Surface area: 106,990 acres (43,300 ha)
- Settlements: Corpus Christi, Portland, Ingleside, Ingleside on the Bay

Corpus Christi Bay is a scenic semi-tropical bay on the Texas coast found in San Patricio and Nueces counties, next to the major city of Corpus Christi. It is separated from the Gulf of Mexico by Mustang Island, and is fed by the Nueces River and Oso Creek from its western and southern extensions, Nueces Bay and Oso Bay. The bay is located approximately 136 miles (219 km) south of San Antonio, and 179 miles (288 km) southwest of Houston.

Corpus Christi Bay has a rich history of human settlement along its shores that dates back millennia and is responsible for the growth of Corpus Christi, and the smaller ports of Ingleside and Portland. It is one of seven major estuaries along the Gulf Coast of Texas and supports a diverse collection of wildlife, attracting many tourists. The bay's abundance of petroleum and natural gas has attracted industry, and its strategic location on the Texas coast is ideal for military establishment.

== History ==
The shores of Corpus Christi (or Body of Christ) Bay are thought to have been inhabited by the Karankawa Indians before the European colonization. Archeological evidence suggests that pre-Karankawa peoples used the area near Oso Bay as a burial ground between 500 BC and 500 AD. It is believed to have first been spotted by Europeans on Corpus Christi Day which fell on June 23, 1519, when Spanish explorer Alonso Álvarez de Pineda navigated its waters. Joaquín de Orobio y Basterra came across the bay in 1746, when given orders to settle the area between Tampico, Mexico, and the mouth of the San Antonio River at San Antonio Bay. He named the bay after St. Michael the Archangel, but the name did not stick and was referred to as "Corpus Christi Bay" in a 1766 report by Diego Ortiz Parrilla. Explorer Blas María de la Garza Falcón is believed to have been the first man to purchase land on the bay in 1746. Shortly thereafter the short-lived settlement of Villa de Vedoya was founded on the mouth of the Nueces River.

The first trading post on Corpus Christi Bay was established by Henry Kinney in 1838 in present-day Corpus Christi. By the 1840s, the area developed into a settlement named after the bay, and a deepwater port was established in the 1870s. A bayfront that included a 32-foot overlooking statue of Jesus Christ was designed by Mount Rushmore sculptor Gutzon Borglum in 1928, but was turned down by the city in 1930. Later efforts to build a statue on the shore were also rejected. The bayside port would later grow into a major city, and had a population of 277,454 people during the 2000 U.S. census. In addition to Corpus Christi, Kinney also found Nuecestown (known to settlers as The Motts) in 1852, near the confluence of the Nueces River and Nueces Bay. The town was attacked by Mexican robbers in 1875, and underwent a steep decline. It is now a ghost town located in the Corpus Christi city limits. The city of Ingleside was founded on the northern shore of the bay in 1854, and grew slowly. It had a population of 9,388 in the 2000 census. Likewise, the city of Portland located on the northeastern bluff between the Nueces and Corpus Christi Bays, did not grow as rapidly as Corpus Christi, following its 1891 founding. During the 2000 census, it had 14,827 residents.

For transportation on the bay, steamboats were commonplace between Corpus Christi and Ingleside during the 1930s. Native Americans used a route made up of a series of shallow oyster beds, dubbed Reef Road. The passage, which was about 18 to 24 inches in depth, could be navigated on foot or horseback during low tides to travel across the opening of Nueces Bay into Corpus Christi Bay. White settlers discovered the road in the 1860s, and it became a common way to pass from Portland to Corpus Christi via buggy, although its jagged course had to be marked with posts and horses would sometimes fall off the beds and drown. A wooden causeway connecting Portland and Corpus Christi was first constructed in 1915, but was repeatedly rebuilt and destroyed by several storms. A permanent concrete bridge was erected in the 1950s, and a double lane was added in 1988. The approximately mile long structure is today known as the Nueces Bay Causeway.

The bay has been strategically important for the military. General Zachary Taylor stationed his men on Rincon Point during the Mexican–American War, and a Union invasion was halted by Confederates on the same point in 1862, during the American Civil War. The Port of Corpus Christi was used by the Confederates to bring in supplies during the war effort until the Union bombarded Corpus Christi and occupied the bay and port from 1863 to 1870. In 1940, the Naval Air Station Corpus Christi was established on the bay, and by 1944 had transformed into a major base with one main air station and six additional stations. Notably, during a March 1960 practice run from the base, future Senator John McCain lost track of his altitude and speed, and his single-seat, single-pistoned-engine AD-6 Skyraider crashed into Corpus Christi Bay and sank to the bottom. He squeezed out of the cockpit, swam ten feet to the surface, and was carried to safety by a rescue helicopter, therefore escaping without major injuries.

== Features ==
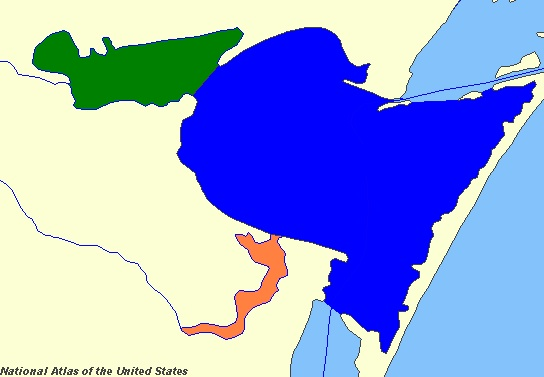
Corpus Christi Bay (blue), Oso Bay (orange), Nueces Bay (green)

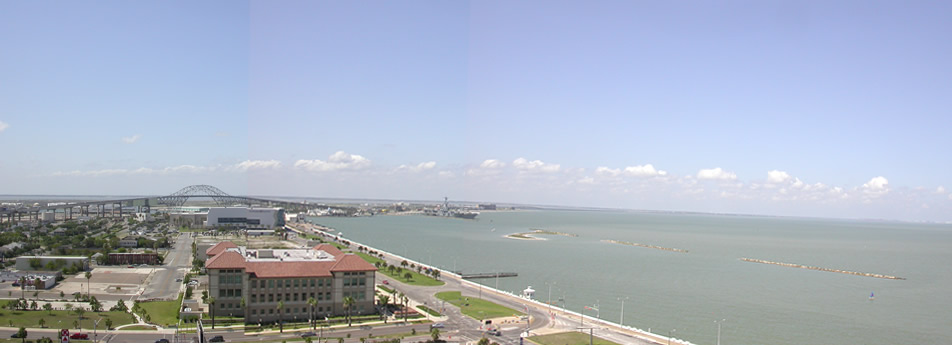
A spoils island shown from the shore of Corpus Christi Bay at Rincon Point

The shoreline of Corpus Christi Bay is included in the Texas Coastal Plain in South Texas. The surrounding land is semi-arid and is used for ranching and other agricultural purposes. The bay itself is considered subtropical, and was described by Gutzon Borglum as "the most beautiful bay on the Texas coast."

On average, the system is 3 meters (9.8 ft) deep, and covers approximately 497 square kilometers (192 sq mi). The two main extensions are Nueces Bay, which extends west to the mouth of the Nueces River, and Oso Bay, which extends south to the mouth of Oso Creek. Together with its extensions, it forms one of seven major estuaries along the Gulf Coast of Texas, and the fourth largest behind Galveston Bay, Laguna Madre and Matagorda Bay. Every second, approximately 34 cubic meters (9,000 U.S. gal) of water flows into the bay. The exchange with the Gulf of Mexico occurs at Aransas Pass. As a result of the seawater exchange, the bay's salinity is 22 parts per thousand (ppt), which is lower than the seawater average of 35 ppt.

Following the shoreline beginning at Naval Air Station Corpus Christi on the bay's southeastern peninsula, the features of the bay can be best described. Moving northwest from the air station, Oso Bay must be crossed at its confluence with Corpus Christi Bay. On the other side of the meeting is Ward Island (actually a peninsula), where Texas A&M University–Corpus Christi is found. Further northwest, the shore begins to curve and off in the distance across the bay, the skyline of Corpus Christi is visible. Following the shore, the land dips inward and forms Emerald Cove, where a seawall has been constructed. Out in the bay, the Alta Vista Reef can be spotted from this location. Moving north along the shore, the seawall continues into the main city, until it reaches Industrial Canal, which has been dredged south of Nueces Bay and extends into the main bay to Port Aransas. Another seawall, which starts in Emerald Cove with gaps at places such as a spoils island that can be viewed in the bay and the canal, is slightly out in the water. This seawall ends when it reaches land at the southern portion of Corpus Christi Beach. North of the canal, Corpus Christi Beach is found along the shore to Rincon Point, where Corpus Christi Bay opens to Nueces Bay and must be crossed using the Nueces Bay Causeway to Indian Point near Portland, from where Indian Reef juts from offshore. Past Portland, the shore curves to the southeast where the large La Quinta Island forms on the backdrop of industrial plants in Ingleside. The La Quinta Channel has been dredged between the island and the shore and meets the Jewell Fulton canal at the confluence of Kinney Bayou. Ingleside Cove is formed in this area between La Quinta Island and an island named Ingleside Point. The shore then curves to the southwest where Ingleside on the Bay is located on southern shore of the bay's northeastern peninsula. To the southeast, a series of islands form the boundary between Corpus Christi and Redfish Bays.

== Ecosystem ==
The Environmental Protection Agency has designated the Corpus Christi Bay system as an estuary of national significance. More than 234 species of fish are found in the bay, including the Gafftopsail catfish, Hardhead catfish, Atlantic croaker, Atlantic cutlassfish, Black drum, Red drum, Southern flounder, Crevalle jack, Ladyfish, Inshore lizardfish, Atlantic midshipman, Silver perch, Pinfish, Smooth puffer, Scaled sardine, Bighead searobin, Sand seatrout, Spotted seatrout, Sheepshead, Gray snapper, Common snook, and tripletail.

In 2009, $1 million of federal stimulus money was delegated to the restoration of the marshland near the Nueces Bay Causeway to increase the population of birds and fish. The Coastal Bend Bays and Estuaries Program and the U.S. Fish and Wildlife Service collaborated to place soil and plant marsh near the causeway to allow a larger nursing location for fish and provide greater quantities of food for water birds. Over 490 species of birds have been found in the area including the brown pelican, black-billed whistling duck, reddish egret, white-faced ibis, pauraque, buff-bellied hummingbird, golden-fronted woodpecker, long-billed thrasher, olive sparrow, Neotropic cormorant, laughing gull, Franklin's gull, ring-billed gull, herring gull, gull-billed tern, common loon, brown-crested flycatcher, hooded oriole, peregrine falcon and piping plover. Bird populations are protected and can be viewed at the Hans and Pat Suter Wildlife Refuge on Oso Bay.

== Industry ==
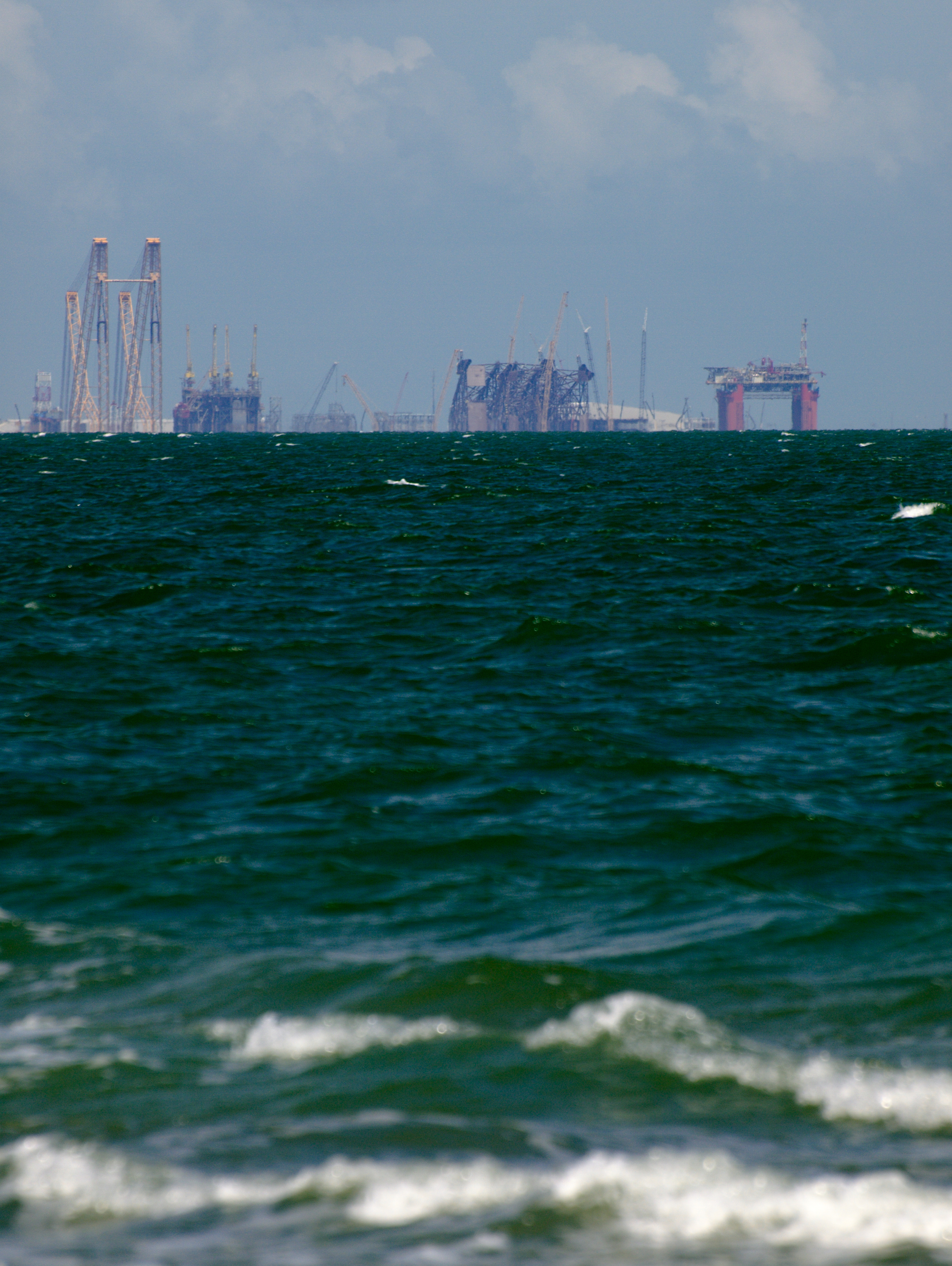
Industry toward Ingleside

Corpus Christi Bay is a natural harbor, and its port has contributed to the growth of the main port city of Corpus Christi. Corpus Christi is the 5th largest port in the United States, and the deepest on the Gulf of Mexico. The channel to the Gulf was dredged through the bay to the jetties at Port Aransas. Freight exchanged at the port include seafood, industrial and agricultural goods and petroleum. Six oil refineries and 1,500 wells are located near the bay as well as a large supply of natural gas. In 1987 alone, $277 million of oil and gas were produced in the area. Metals, stone products, glass, chemicals, and gypsum products are also produced near the bay. Ingleside originally focused its economy on agriculture, notably viticulture. Later, industrial plants including those established by the Brauer Corporation, Reynolds Metals (five miles away) and DuPont opened. La Quinta Channel was dredged by the Army Corps of Engineers in the 1950s.

Tourism to the bay is encouraged by the area's climate, fishing and birding opportunities as well as sites in Corpus Christi including Corpus Christi beach, Texas State Aquarium, USS Lexington Museum, the bayfront marina, and the Corpus Christi Museum of Science and History. The bay was also the site of the 2008 U.S. Wind and Water Open, as well as the Texas International Boat Show in 2008, 2009 and 2010.
