= Flour Bluff, Corpus Christi, Texas =

Neighborhood of Corpus Christi

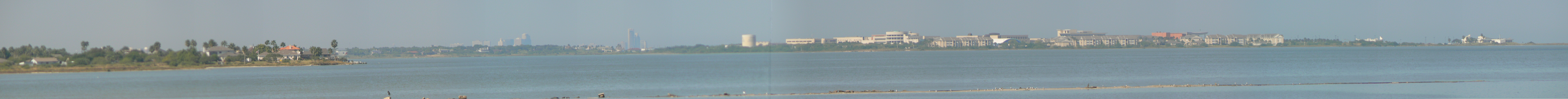
A panorama of Corpus Christi taken from Flour Bluff

Flour Bluff is a specified area of the city of Corpus Christi, Texas, United States. It is located on Encinal peninsula bordered by Corpus Christi Bay on the north, Oso Bay on the west, the Laguna Madre on the east and the King Ranch to the south. South Padre Island Drive crosses Flour Bluff, dividing it into an upper part, commonly known as North Bluff, (mostly occupied by Corpus Christi Naval Air Station), and a lower part, commonly known as South Bluff. The terrain is mostly flat and is measured at about 13 feet above sea level. In 2026, the population of Flour Bluff, Corpus Christi, Texas is 32,222 according to the United States Census Bureau. The area is mostly made up of suburban development, with a population consisting mostly of middle-class families, with a median household income of around $90,000. Population of the area is approximately 30,894 as of 2023. The area is composed of the large school district, the Naval base as well as many food business' varying from fast food to local restaurants.

== History ==
What is now Flour Bluff Drive was once a railroad branch going off Texas Mexican Railway to the Naval Air Station. Waldron Field, located on the south side of Flour Bluff, was built during World War II and since then has been used as a Navy landing airfield. One can commonly see the orange and white training planes flying around the area. Of historical interest: President George H. W. Bush was relocated at the Navy base for training classes in 1942. Future senator John McCain was also trained at this Navy base. The development of the Naval Air Station Corpus Christi contributed to population growth and economic development in the Flour Bluff area. With the land and the livestock Corpus had to offer, the area's agricultural resources and military presence attracted new residents.

According to the Historical Marker located on SH 358 eastbound, near Laguna Shores Road, just west of the JFK Memorial causeway, in the spring of 1838 France blockaded the coast of Mexico during the Pastry War, so-called because the casus belli of the war being a French pastry chef seeking reparations for his destroyed pastry shop, allegedly by Mexican officers. The strategic location of Corpus Christi Bay led to the revival of smuggling in this area. Supplies were carried overland across the Rio Grande, and the illicit trade flourished as Mexico bought sorely needed goods in Texas. President Sam Houston did not wish to antagonize Mexico. However, Mexican patrols at Corpus Christi offended many Texans. In July, 1838, authorities in Texana, Texas heard reports of Mexican activity near the bay. A captured Mexican sea captain said that his government had declared Corpus Christi a port of entry and had dispatched about 400 men to protect it. A summons was issued, calling Texans to rally at Texana on August 7 to drive the Mexicans from the Republic's boundaries. By the time the volunteers reached the area, some of the Mexicans had landed their supplies near the tip of Corpus Christi Bay and returned to Matamoros. The rest scattered, leaving behind about 100 barrels of flour and parts of a steam engine. The Texans confiscated the usable flour and other contraband, and the site became known as Flour Bluff.

== Education ==
Flour Bluff is home to the Flour Bluff Independent School District. According to the Texas Education Agency, even independent school districts are governed by elected school boards that represent their local community. Six campuses and athletic facilities are located on a single 170-acre site which supports 5,600 students in prekindergarten through 12th grades. Flour Bluff Independent School District staffs 757.15 employees according to the National Center for Education Statistics. Flour Bluff Independent School District is a TEA recognized district in South Texas. Flour Bluff Independent School District currently population consists of 45.8% Hispanics, 43.9% Whites, 2.1% Asians, and 2.0% Blacks. Less than 1% are Indian and Pacific Islander. The district is home to students ranging from NAS, Flour Bluff area, and North Padre Island. In 2006, the school implemented the University Preparatory Program allowing High school freshman to begin earning 2 years of college credits while still completing a high school diploma.

Flour Bluff High School came under fire in 2011 in a scandal that received national attention, due to the district's initial refusal to allow students to form a GSA (Gay-Straight Alliance) on campus, despite allowing FCA (Fellowship of Christian Athletes) factions in their high school and junior high. (FBISD initially denied the formation of the GSA due to the fact that it was a 'non-curricular' club. When it was pointed out that the FCA and other clubs were also non-curricular, and still allowed to meet on campus, all clubs were briefly suspended. Due to parent and student outrage, several clubs were reinstated.) This refusal was found to contradict the First Amendment, as well as the Equal Access Act.

In Spring 2011, a petition was circulated to allow the formation of the GSA. The ACLU (American Civil Liberties Union) sent a letter to Superintendent Carbajal on March 2, 2011, requesting the formation of the club be allowed.

It was eventually decided that the GSA be allowed to form, and meet on campus.

== Recreation ==
Flour Bluff is bordered on the East by the Laguna Madre, renowned for its fine Red Drum, (or Redfish) and Trout fishing. The Boat Hole, accessed from the North Bluff is an area between the Naval Air Station on the west and Dimmit's Island on the east; Corpus Christi Bay to the north and the Boat Hole flats (immediately north of the JFK Causeway) to the south provides excellent fishing. Deeper draft boats come in from the bay, while shallower boats can use the channel that parallels Flour Bluff to the north of the JFK causeway. Flour Bluff houses The CCA Marine Development Center in Flour Bluff, Corpus Christi, Texas. The hatchery produces red drum and spotted sea trout into the Texas bays.

One of Flour Bluff's many parks, Waldron Park, is also the site of a 9-hole disc golf course and a small pond with a picnic spot. The area has many other parks, a skate park and the public pool, Parker Pool. Adjacent to the public pool you can find a basket ball court that is also open to the public.

== See also ==
- Corpus Christi, Texas
- Flour Bluff Independent School District
- Corpus Christi Naval Air Station
