= Oso Bay =

Bay in Corpus Christi, Texas

Coordinates: 27°41′30″N 97°18′40″W

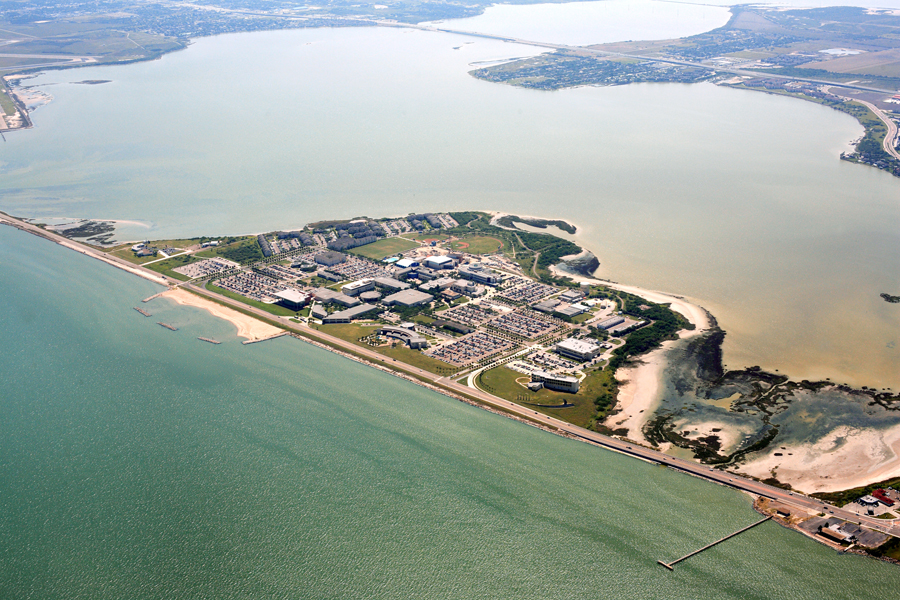
Ward Island with Oso Bay in the background

Oso Bay is a bay bordered by Corpus Christi, Texas. The bay is fed freshwater by Oso Creek and saltwater from Corpus Christi Bay. The Hans and Pat Suter Wildlife Refuge is located on the bay's western shore near the Pharaoh Valley subdivision, Naval Air Station Corpus Christi is located on its eastern shore in Flour Bluff, newly created Skimmer Key is located between the Oso Bay Bridge and the Naval Air Station, and Texas A&M University - Corpus Christi on Ward Island is located on the northern shore of Oso Bay. On the bay’s southwestern shore is the Oso Bay Wetlands Preserve.

== Recreation ==
Oso Bay's sea floor consists of mostly mud, ooze, and oyster reefs, which is discouraging for swimming. The depth of the main bay and an old, abandoned railroad structure along with the abundance of oysters and vegetation promote fishing. Birding and hiking are popular activities along the wildlife refuge on the North shore of Oso Bay. Boating, kayaking, and kite surfing are also some attractions to Oso Bay.

=== Fishing ===
Surf fishing, or wade fishing, is a popular activity in Oso Bay due to its shallow depth. Species of fish in Oso Bay include: Red Drum, Black Drum, and Spotted Seatrout. Live Shrimp and artificial lures are commonly used for fishing in the area.

=== Birding ===
Oso Bay is home to the Hans and Pat Suter Wildlife Refuge which is considered to be one of the best sea bird watching areas in the world. Some of the birds regularly found in the on and around Oso Bay are: pelicans, herons, seagulls, coots, egrets, spoonbills, skimmers, and ducks.

== Galley ==
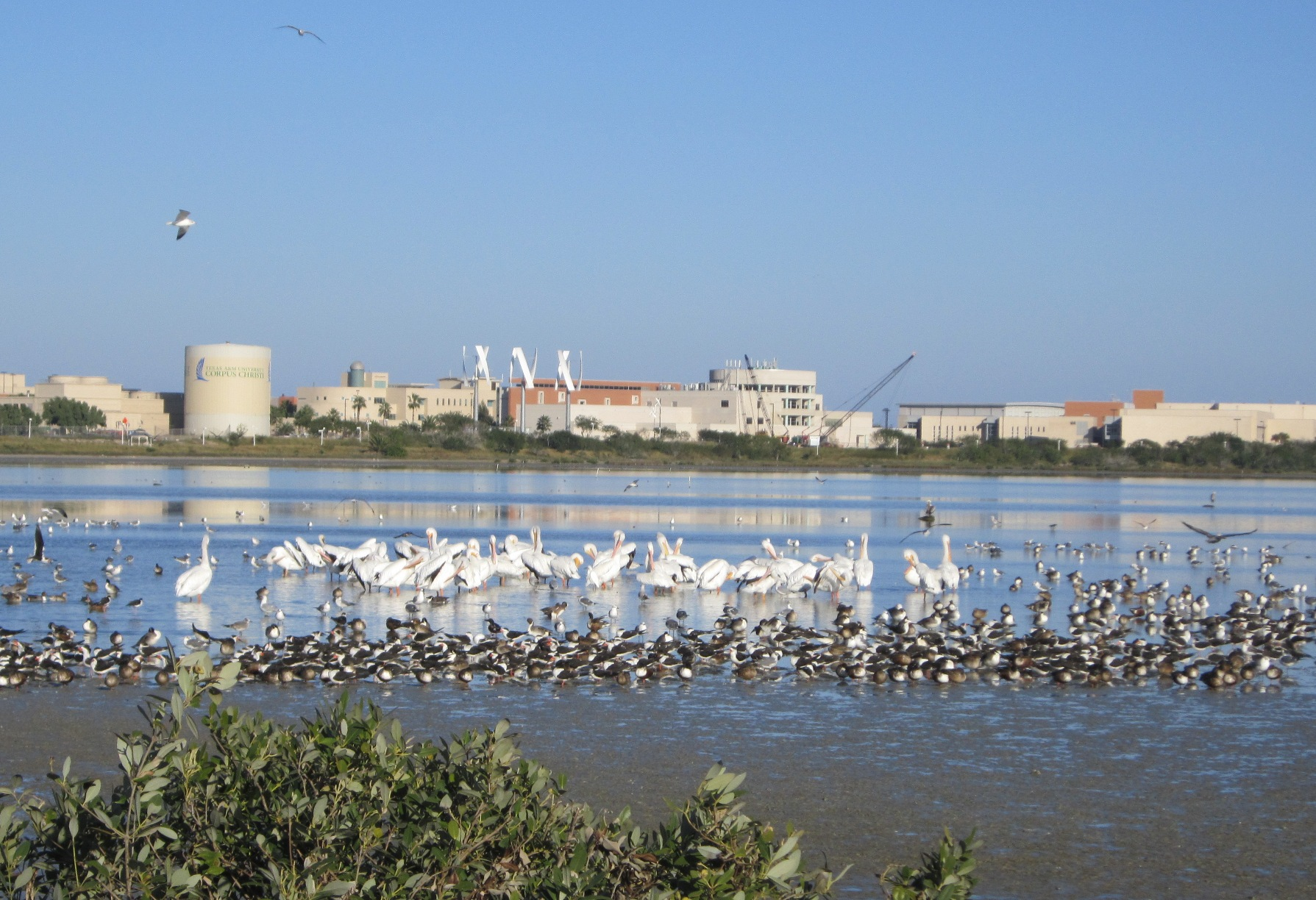
View from the Hans & Pat Suter Wildlife Refuge

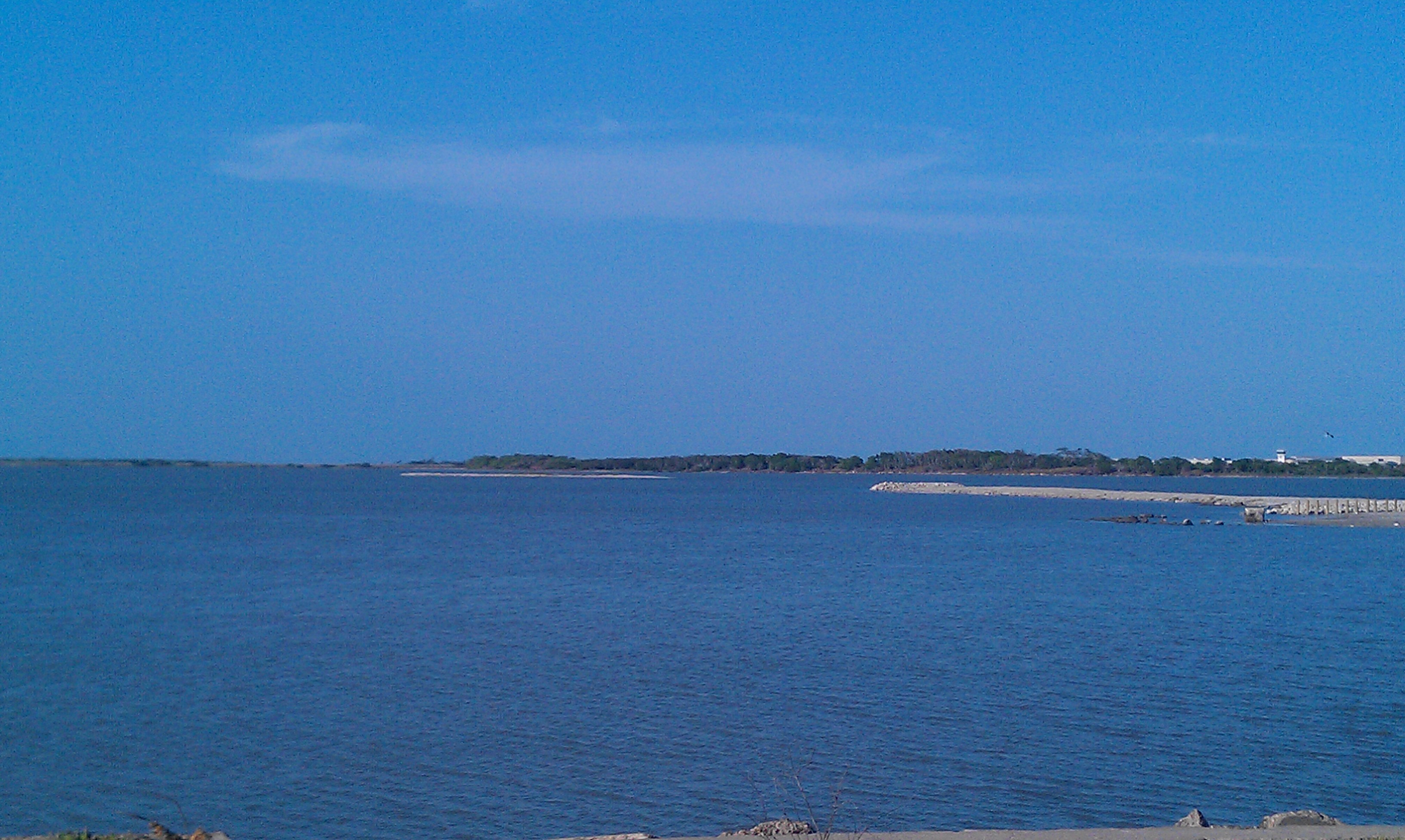
Skimmer Key

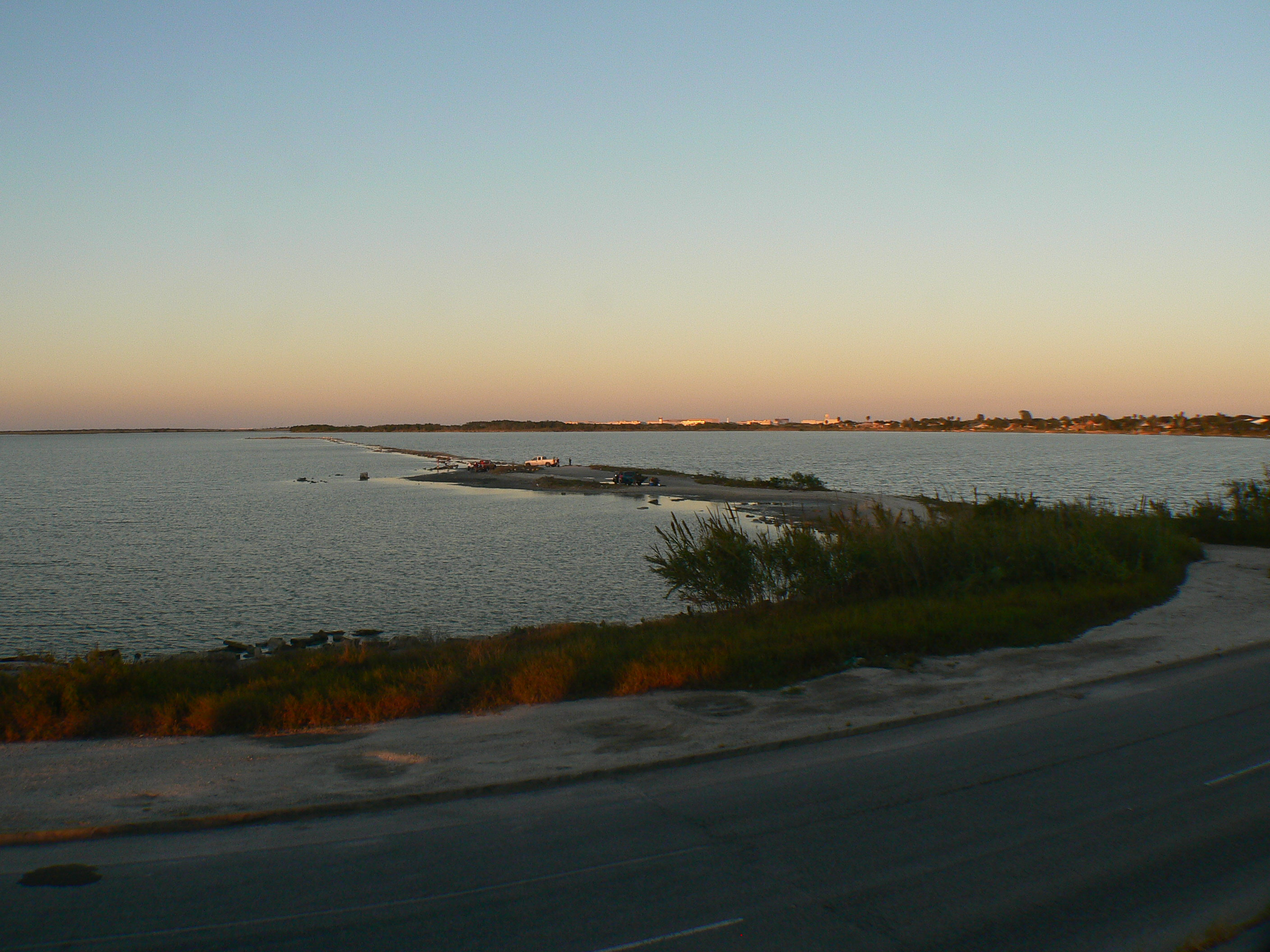

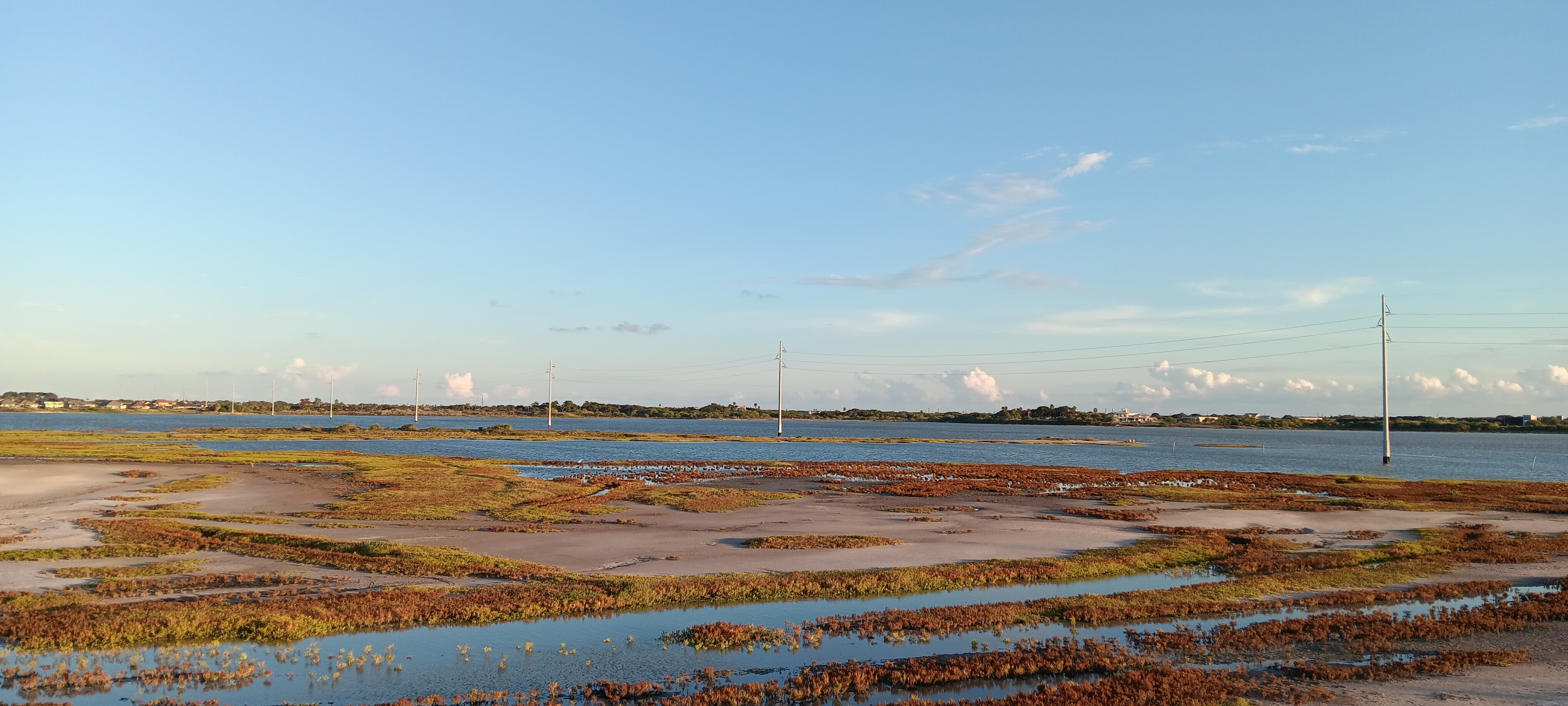

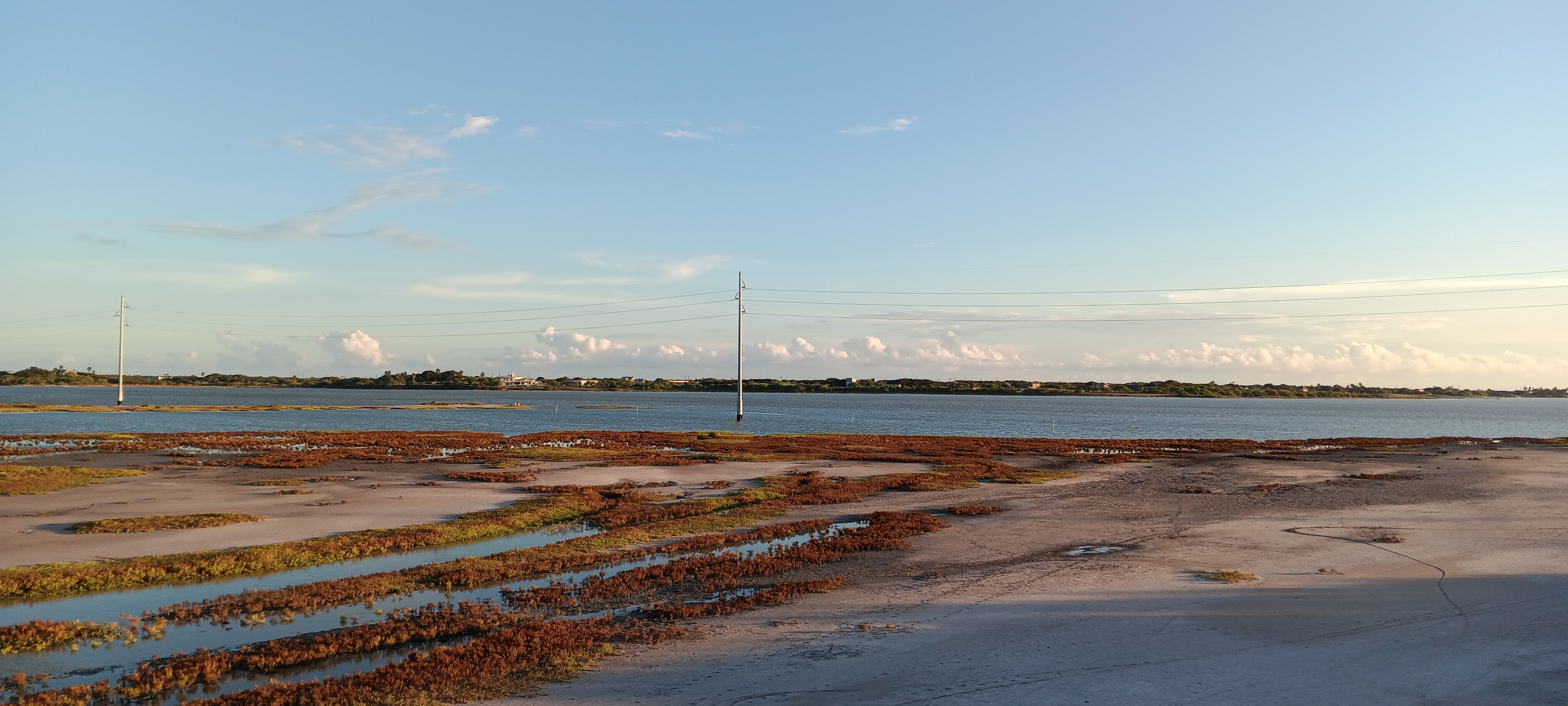

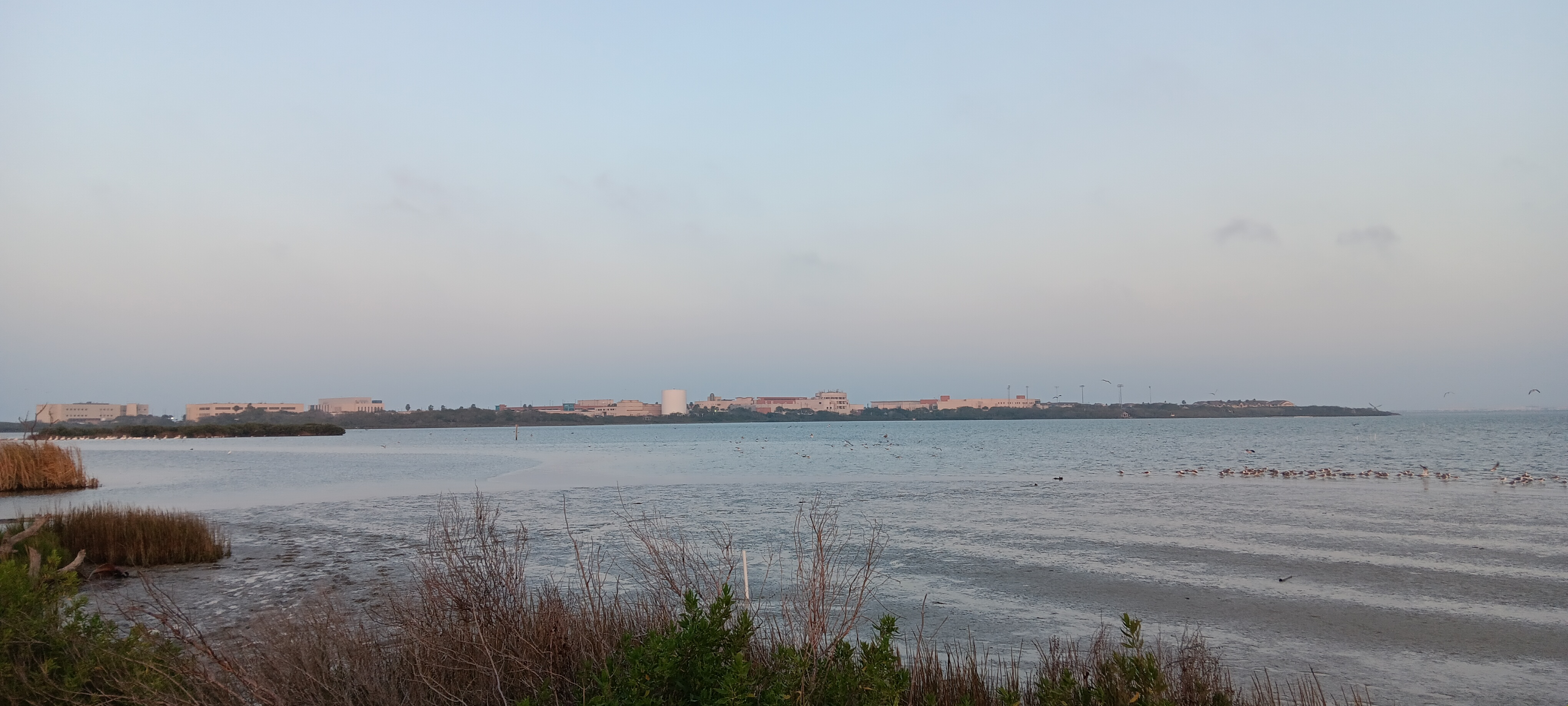

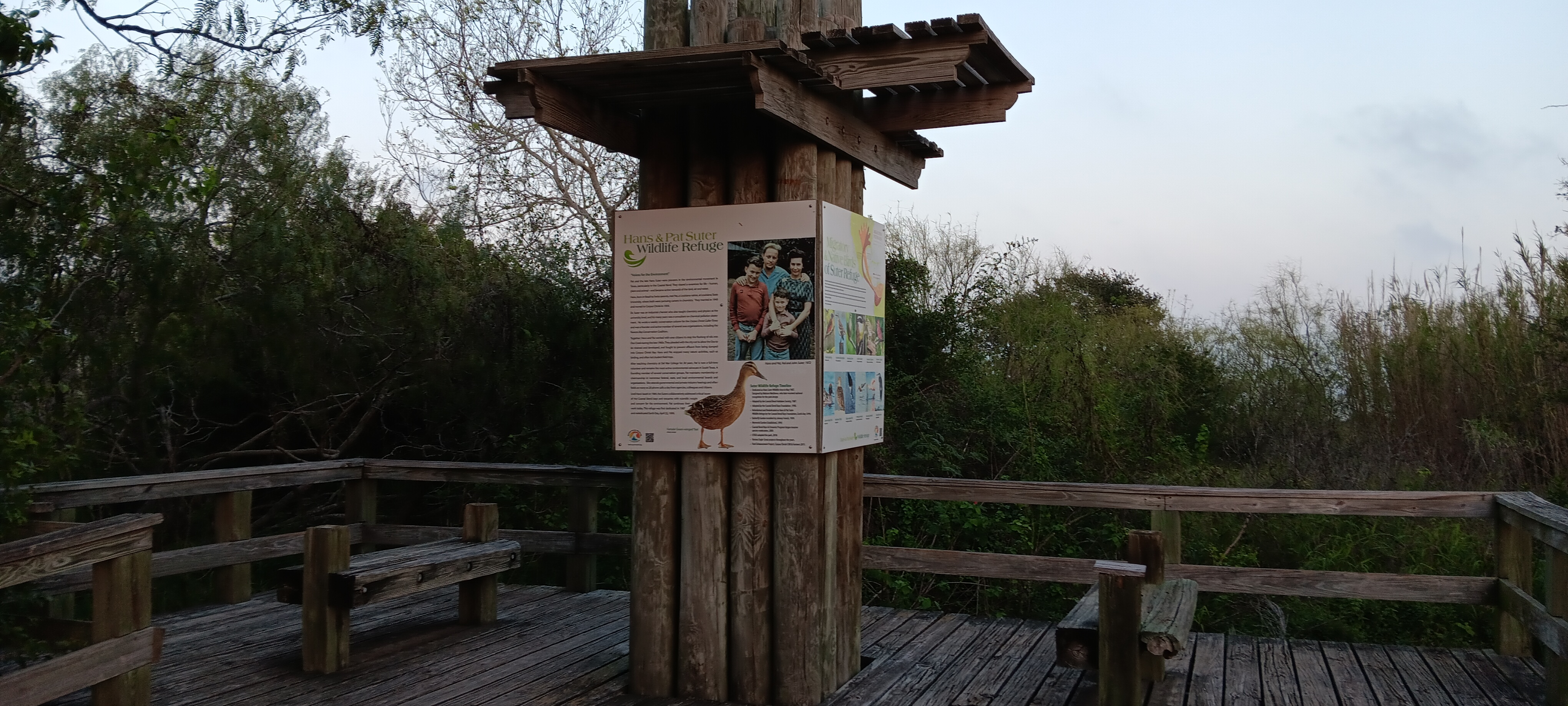
