= Oso Creek (Texas) =

Coordinates: 27°38′42″N 97°20′35″W

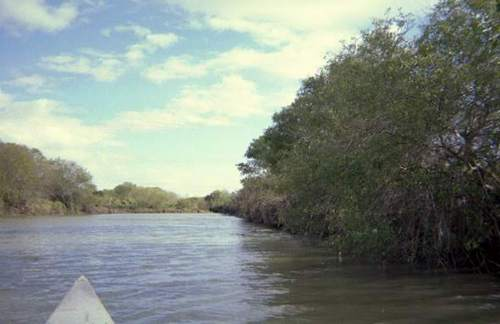
- Oso Creek
- Map

Location
- Country: United States
- State: Texas
- County: Nueces

Physical characteristics
- Mouth
  - elevation: 0 m (0 ft)
- Length: 28 mi (45 km)

Basin features
- GNIS: 1343330

Oso Creek is a creek in the U.S. state of Texas. It runs just south of Corpus Christi.

== Geography ==
Oso Creek is entirely located in Nueces County. The creek rises near the western edge of Corpus Christi 3 mi (4.8 km) northeast of Robstown in northern Nueces County (at 27°49' N, 97°37' W) and runs southeast for twenty-eight miles to its mouth on Cayo del Oso, three miles southwest of Corpus Christi Naval Air Station (at 27°39' N, 97°21' W). It traverses flat to rolling terrain surfaced by dark, calcareous clays that support mesquite, grasses, and cacti. The stream has been identified as the one named La Purísma Concepción by Capt. Joaquín Orobio y Basterra during his exploration of the Gulf Coast in 1747. Oso Creek, along with Oso Bay, serves as a boundary that separates the Southside and Flour Bluff districts of Corpus Christi.

== Flooding ==
Oso Creek is subject to severe flash floods, especially when tropical systems move in or when the area is plagued by days of heavy rain. On the morning of September 20, 2010 a 35-year-old man drowned when he drove around barricades at the Oso Creek Bridge on Weber Road. Authorities said a male driver, who had recently moved from Nigeria, was late to his job as a nursing assistant and told another motorist he was going to try to cross the bridge. The other driver and the trapped man both called police when the Ford Focus began to drift into the creek, but authorities couldn't locate the car as it moved downstream.

The creek swelled to more than 30 feet, the highest level ever recorded.

== See also ==
- List of rivers of Texas
- Oso Bay
- West Oso Independent School District
