= One Shoreline Plaza =

Skyscraper in Corpus Christi, Texas

Coordinates: 27.7993°N 97.3918°W

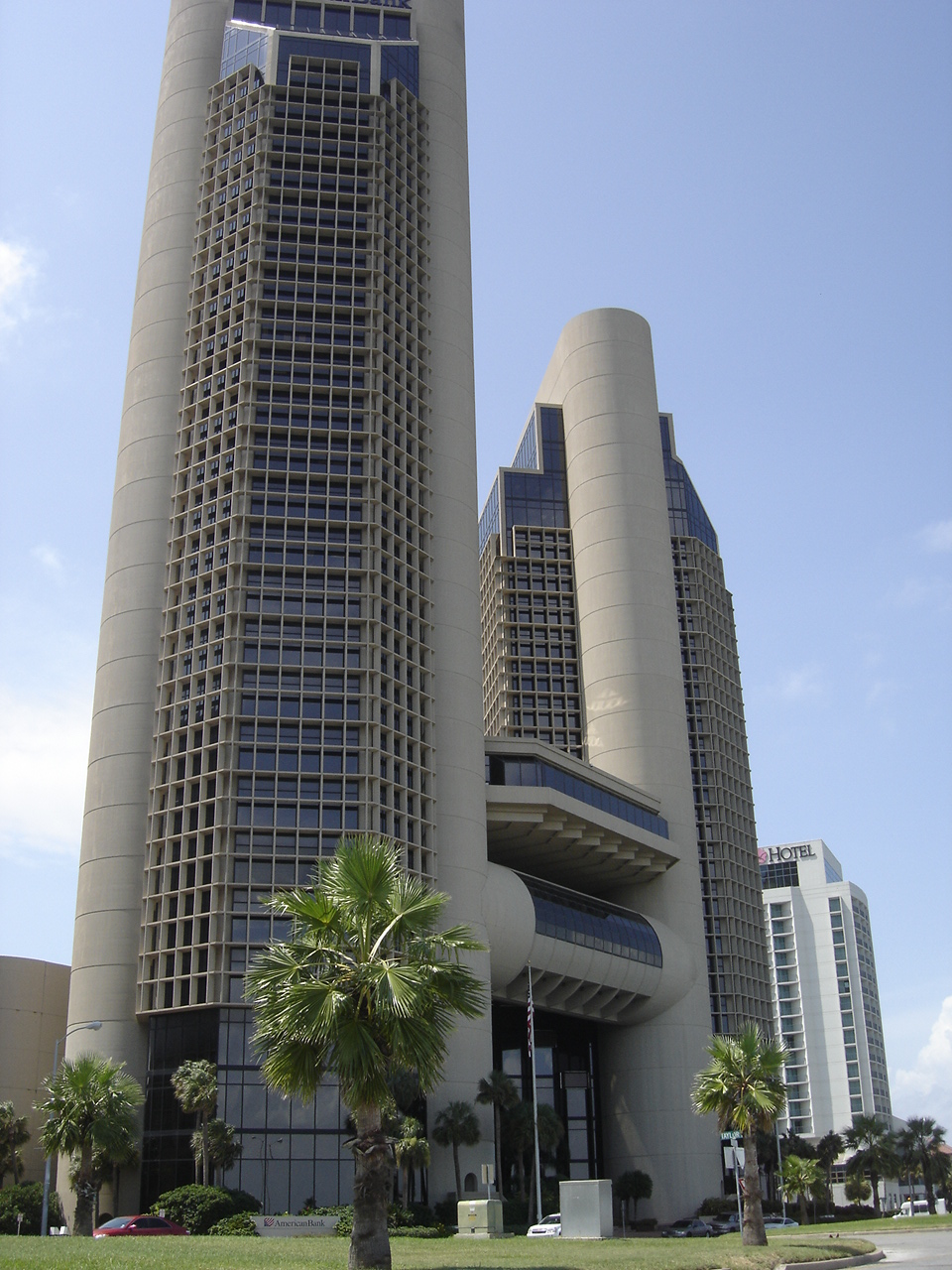
- as seen from Shoreline Boulevard looking northwestward
- Interactive map of the One Shoreline Plaza area

General information
- Status: Completed
- Type: business and office space
- Location: One Shoreline Plaza; Corpus Christi, Texas
- Construction started: 1983
- Completed: 1988

Height
- Roof: South tower: 125 m (410 ft); North tower: 114 m (374 ft)

Technical details
- Floor count: South tower: 28; North tower: 22

Design and construction
- Architects: Morgan Spear And Associates; Boone & Associates

One Shoreline Plaza in Corpus Christi, Texas overlooks Corpus Christi Bay and consists of 2 skyscrapers, north and south, south being the tallest, and the tallest building in South Texas south of San Antonio. It is the most prominent figure in the skyline of the city.

== Images ==
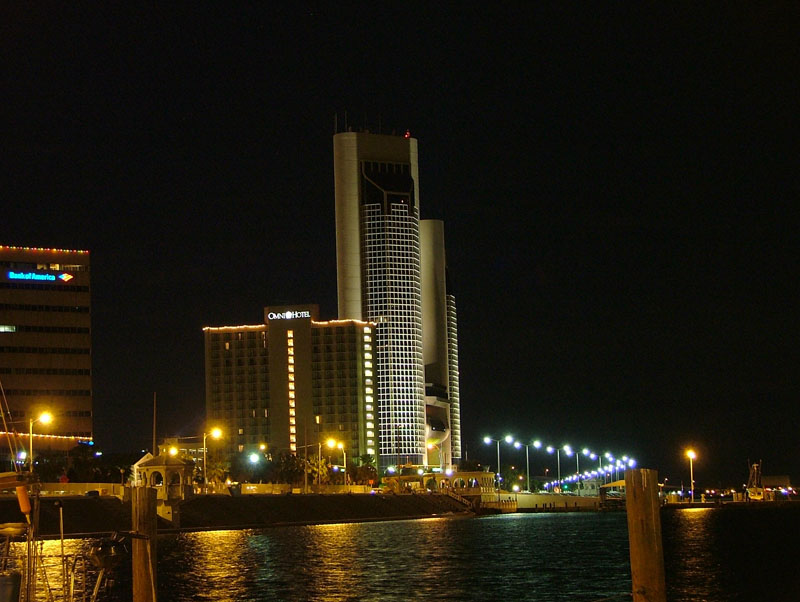
One Shoreline Plaza and small section of North Shoreline Boulevard at night

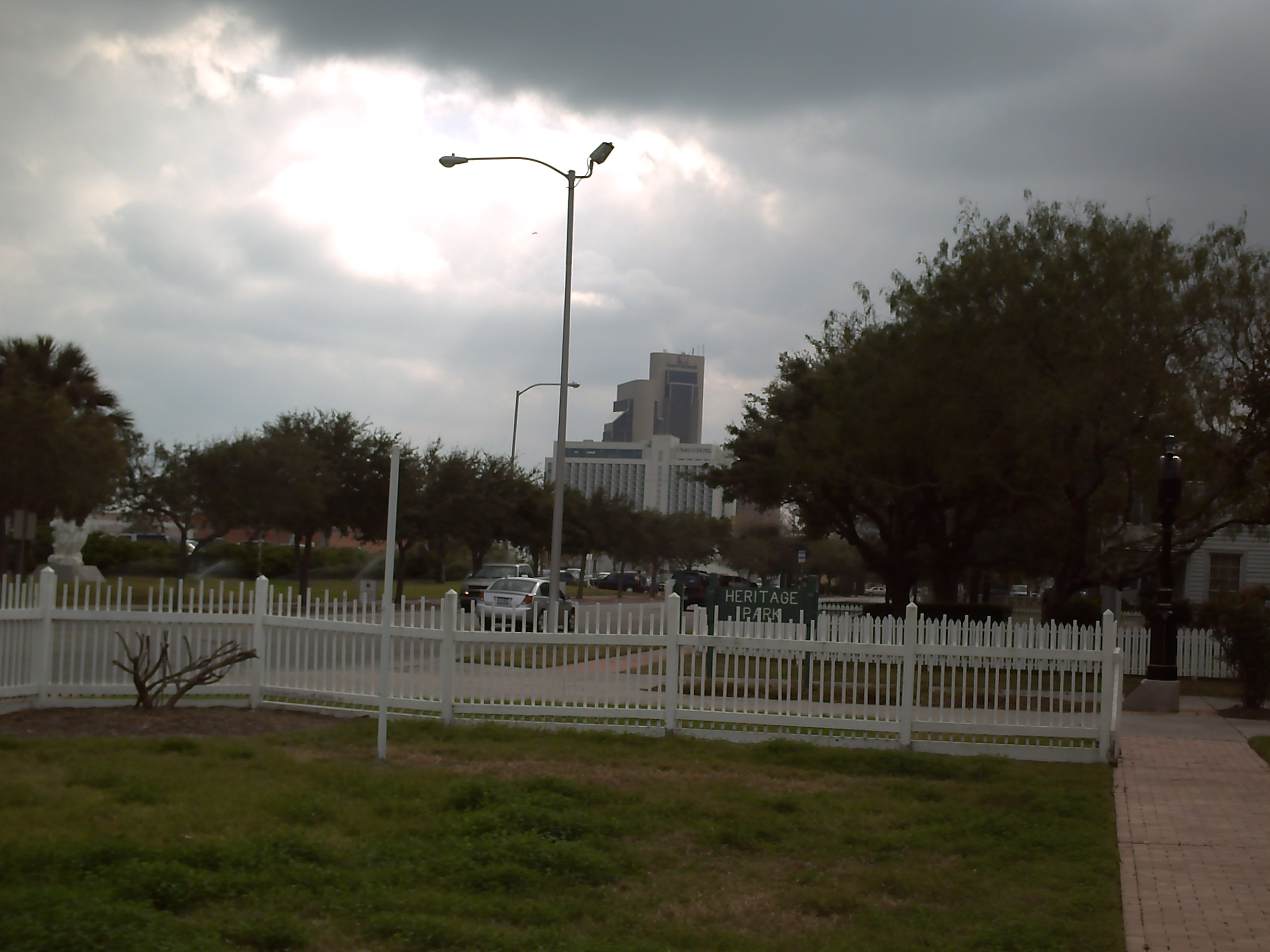
Distant view of One Shoreline Plaza from Heritage Park
