= Broadway Tower (Corpus Christi, Texas) =

Skyscraper in Corpus Christi Texas

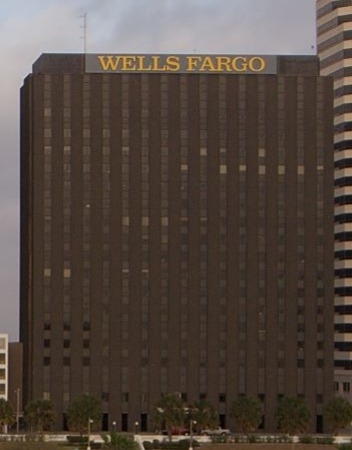
- Wells Fargo Tower in 2009
- Interactive map of the Broadway Tower area

General information
- Status: Completed
- Type: Office
- Location: 615 N Upper Broadway, Corpus Christi, Texas, United States
- Coordinates: 27.7970585°N 97.3969692°W
- Construction started: 1940
- Completed: 1942
- Renovated: 1974

Height
- Height: 249 ft (76 m)

Technical details
- Material: Steel
- Floor count: 20

The Broadway Tower (formerly known as Wells Fargo Tower, Norwest Tower and Robert Driscoll Hotel) is a 20-story high-rise office building located at 615 North Upper Broadway Street in the city of Corpus Christi, Texas, United States. At the time of its completion in 1942, it was the tallest building in the city, and remained so for several decades. The building open on May 25, 1942, and it was built by Clara Driscoll and named after her father Robert Driscoll.

== See also ==
- List of tallest buildings in Corpus Christi
