= Coastal Bend Council of Governments =

Regional council in South Texas

- Logo

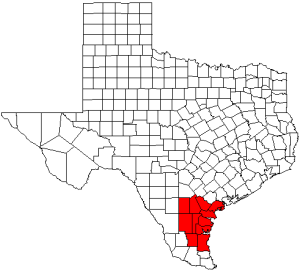
- Map of Texas highlighting counties served by the Coastal Bend Council of Governments
- Formation: March 1966
- Type: Voluntary association of governments
- Region served: 11,436 sq mi (29,620 km^{2})
- Members: 11 counties

Historical population
| Year | Pop. | ±% |
|---|---|---|
| 2000 | 548,161 | — |
| 2010 | 571,280 | +4.2% |
| 2020 | 582,074 | +1.9% |

The Coastal Bend Council of Governments (CBCOG) is a voluntary association of cities, counties and special districts in South Texas.

Based in Corpus Christi, the Coastal Bend Council of Governments is a member of the Texas Association of Regional Councils.

== Counties served ==
- Aransas
- Bee
- Brooks
- Duval
- Jim Wells
- Kenedy
- Kleberg
- Live Oak
- Nueces
- Refugio
- San Patricio

=== Former Counties served ===
- McMullen (1966-2013; now part of AACOG)

== Largest cities in the region ==
- Corpus Christi
- Kingsville
- Alice
- Portland
- Beeville
- Robstown
- Ingleside
- Mathis
- Sinton
- Falfurrias
