= Wilson Plaza =

Coordinates: 27°47′45″N 97°23′50″W

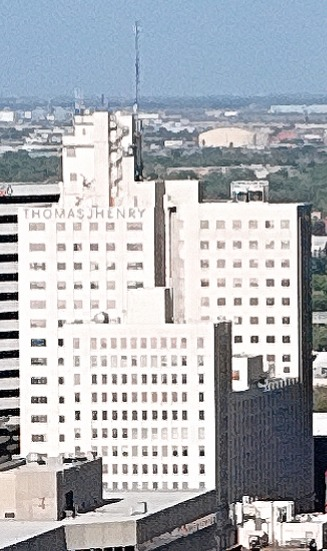

Wilson Plaza is a group of three commercial buildings at 606 N. Carancahua St. in Uptown Corpus Christi, Texas, United States. It includes the first skyscraper in Corpus Christi, Wilson Plaza East, built in 1927, and one of the city's tallest buildings, Wilson Plaza West, built in 1951.

== Development ==
The first building, now known as Wilson Plaza East, was developed by J. Maston Nixon and opened on March 27, 1927 as the Nixon Building. At 12 stories, it was the first skyscraper in Corpus Christi, and was also the first commercial building on a bluff formerly occupied by wealthy residences below which the downtown commercial area later developed. A steel-framed concrete building, it was designed to withstand 200 mph winds and had eight gargoyles on the roof. It was expanded in 1935 with the addition of an 8-story connected building, the Cotton Exchange, most of whose first tenants were cotton traders, later succeeded by oil companies. In 1940, the Baptist Foundation of Texas became the owner.

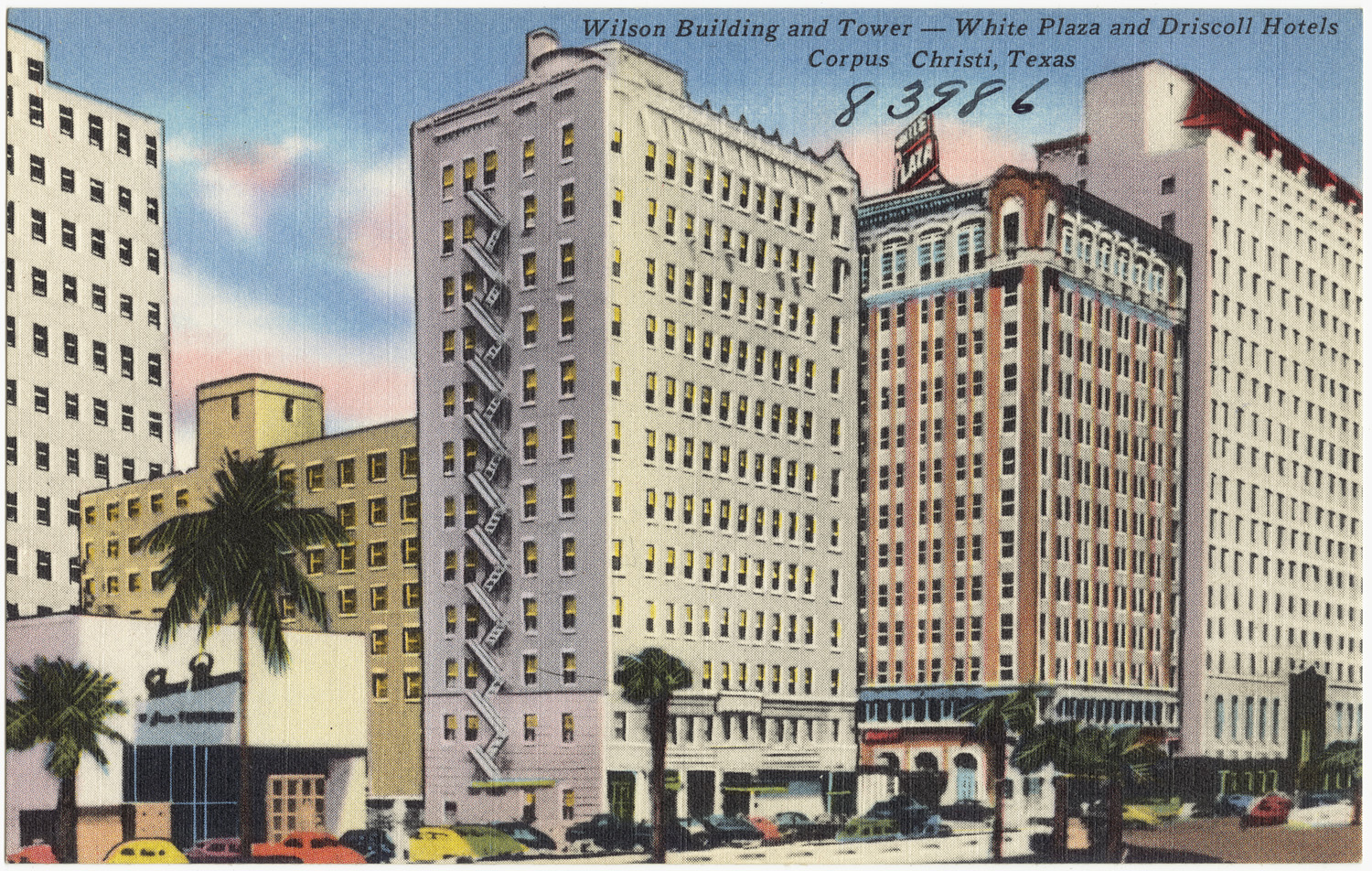
1927 building (center) and Cotton Exchange (left of center) on a 1940s postcard

Oil and real estate developer Sam E. Wilson purchased the two buildings in 1947, together with a number of neighboring buildings. He renamed the Nixon Tower to the Wilson Building and removed the gargoyles. In 1951 he added the west tower, consisting of 17 floors of offices surmounted by a 4-story penthouse. A red neon revolving letter W was mounted on the roof. Wilson also constructed a 6-story parking garage, intended to form the base of a further office tower. The complex totaled 270,000 square feet (25,000 m^{2}), including ground-floor retail and restaurants.

The buildings were subsequently renovated with improved lighting and air conditioning, marble and tile on the ground floors, and a landscaped covered walkway connecting the three towers. The Corpus Christi Geological Library was housed in the building from 1987 to 2024. Other tenants have included the Del Mar Corporation, Southwestern Bell, and in the 21st century the law office of Thomas J. Henry, whose name was placed on the west tower and the parking garage, the City of Corpus Christi, which had its Magistration and Detention Center there for processing all adult arrestees in the city, and the IRS, which had a Taxpayer Assistance Center there.

== Decline and closure ==
Wilson Plaza passed through a succession of owners before being purchased by a Minnesota investment group, who sold it in February 1987 to Ameribass Realty Co. In the late 2010s, the owner defaulted and the complex was auctioned in 2019. The buildings fell into disrepair including non-working elevators in the north and west towers and failed air conditioning, and the complex was cited by the Corpus Christi Fire Department and city code enforcement. In late September 2024, the owners, UC Wilson Plaza Holder LLC, served the remaining tenants with an eviction notice effective October 4, 2024; the deadline was extended and the complex closed on October 25, 2024. The owners said that they intended to carry out extensive renovations.
