= Hans and Pat Suter Wildlife Refuge =

Wildlife refuge in Corpus Christi, Texas, US

Coordinates: 27.70834°N 97.33772°W

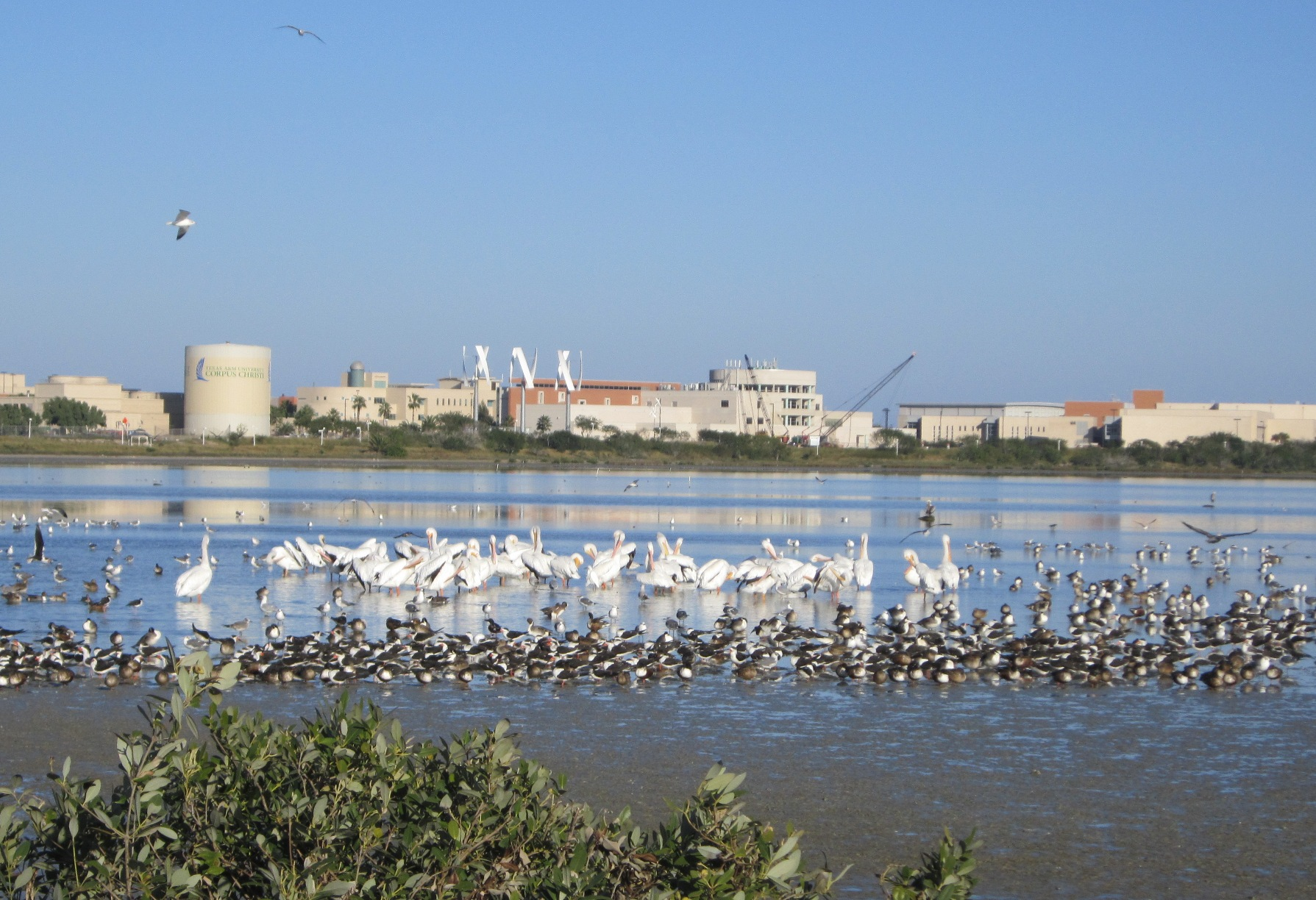
View from Hans & Pat Suter Wildlife Refuge towards TAMUCC

The Hans and Pat Suter Wildlife Refuge is a wildlife refuge in Corpus Christi, Texas, United States. The Refuge is located on the western shore of Oso Bay, on Ennis Joslin Road, near the Pharaoh Valley subdivision.

== Birds ==
The Refuge is considered to be one of the best sea bird watching areas in the world. The nearby Pharaohs golf course also serves as a haven for coastal and migratory birds.

Some of the birds regularly found in the Refuge are

- pelicans
- herons
- gulls
- coots
- egrets
- spoonbills
- and ducks.

== Amenities ==
The Refuge has a pier for viewing the birds and a bike and hiking trail runs through it, meandering by native plants and running along the water. There are also grills and picnic tables in the park area.

== Galley ==
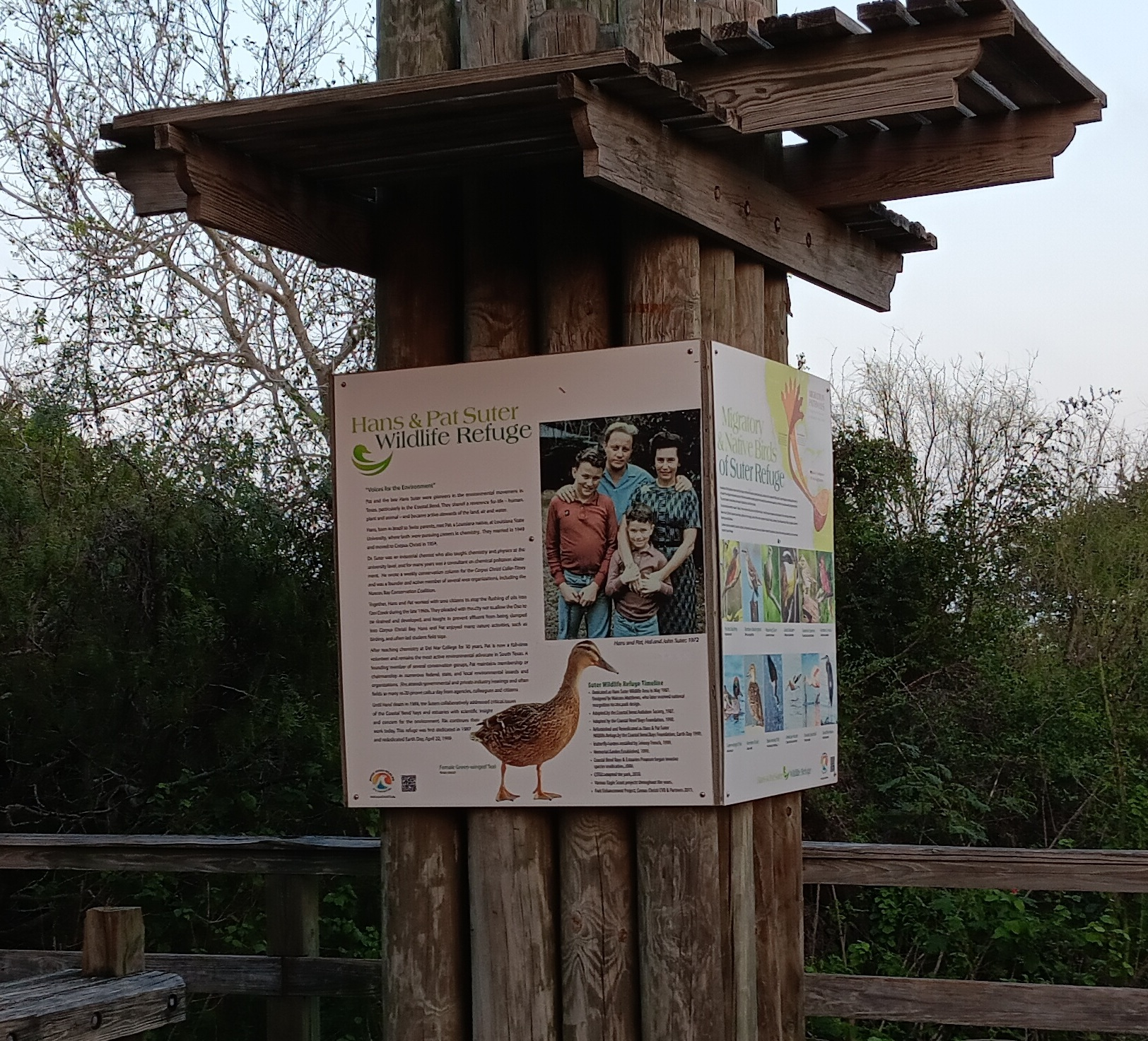

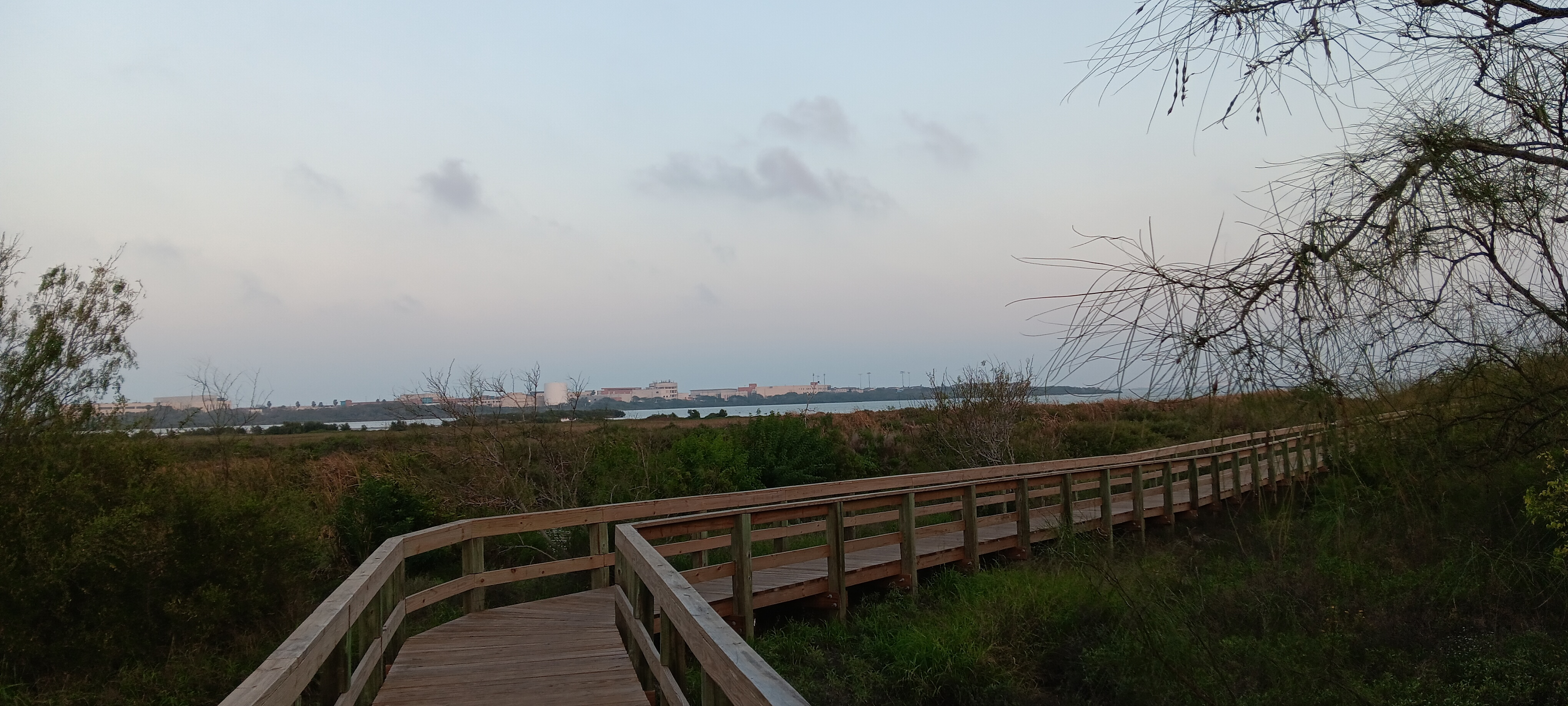

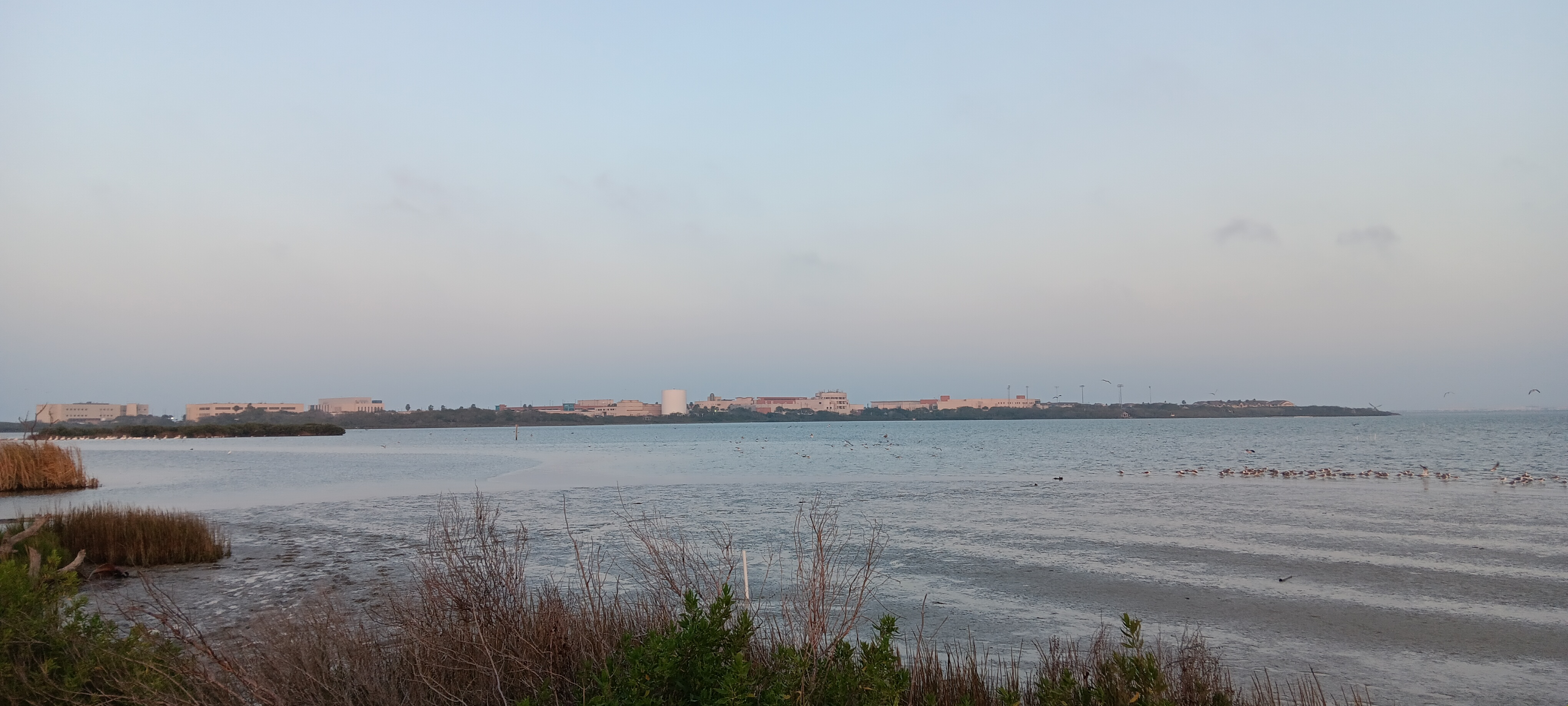

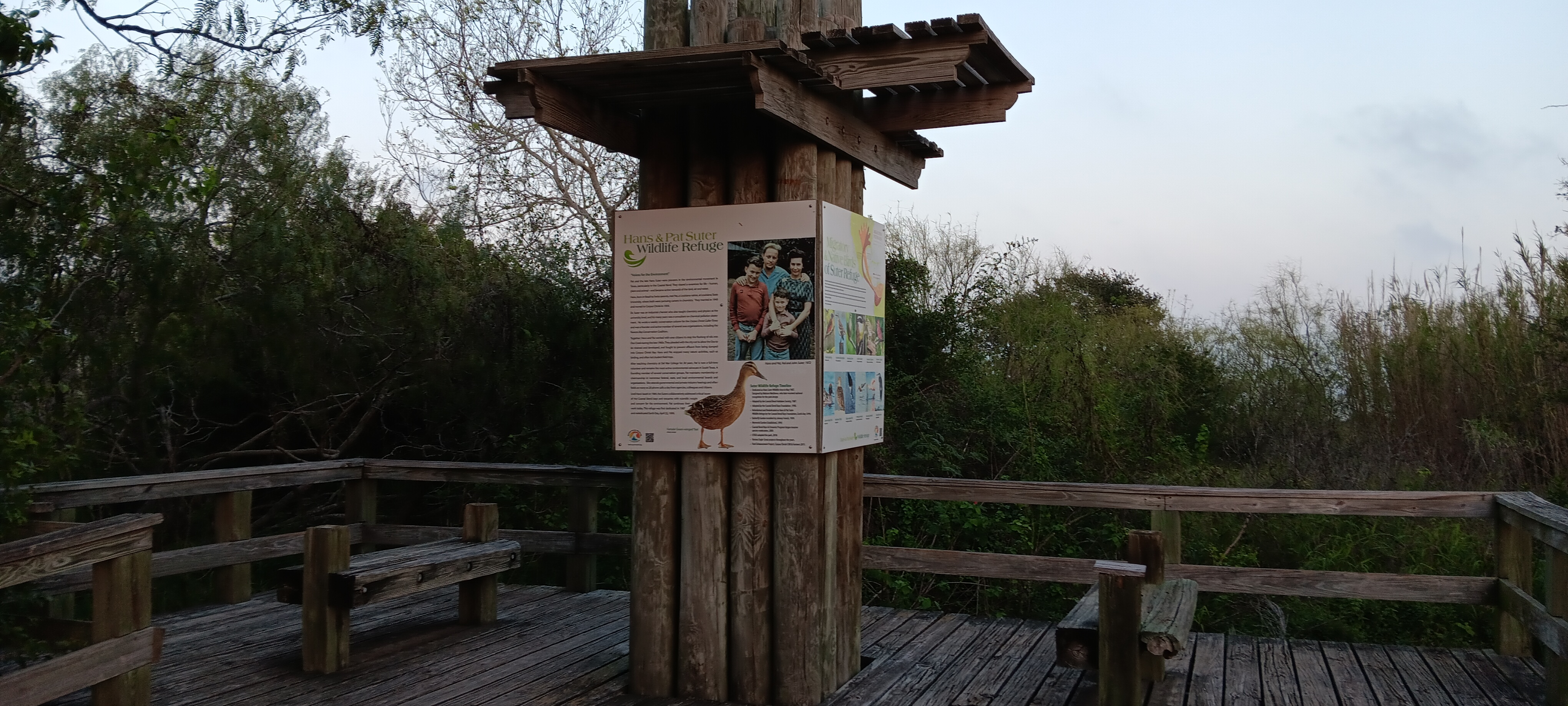

== See also ==
- Protected area
- South Texas
